= Shawty Lo discography =

American hip hop recording artist from Atlanta, Georgia

- Studio albums: 2
- Singles: 20
- Music videos: 3

The discography of Shawty Lo, an American hip hop recording artist from Atlanta, Georgia. Shawty Lo embarked on his career with the Southern hip hop group D4L. The discography consists of one studio album, one posthumous album, 15 mixtapes and 20 singles (including 12 as a featured artist).

== Albums ==
=== Studio albums ===
Album, with selected chart positions
Title	Album details	Peak chart positions		
Title	Album details	US	US R&B	US Rap
Units in the City	Released: February 26, 2008; Label: D4L, Asylum, Warner Bros.; Format: CD, digital download	13	4	2
Rico	Released: March 24, 2017; Label: D4L, 300; Format: CD, digital download	—	—	—

=== Mixtapes ===
Shawty Lo's mixtapes and details
Title	Mixtape details
I'm Da Man	Released: January 1, 2007; Label: D4L; Hosted by DJ Scream
I'm Da Man 2	Released: September 9, 2007; Label: D4L; Hosted by DJ Scream
Guap-a-Holics (with Gucci Mane)	Released: December 8, 2007; Label: D4L, So Icey; Hosted by DJ Scream & Supastar J. Kwik
The Bankhead Boss	Released: March 9, 2008; Label: D4L; Hosted by Trap-A-Holics
The Feature Presentation	Released: June 22, 2008; Label: D4L; Hosted by DJ Scream
Shawty Balboa	Released: February 11, 2009; Label: D4L; Hosted by DJ Fletch & DJ Scream; Retail Mixtape
Fright Night	Released: October 31, 2009; Label: D4L; Hosted by DJ Drama, DJ Scream & DJ Whoo Kid
I'm Da Man 2K9	Released: November 4, 2009; Label: D4L; Hosted by DJ Scream
I'm Da Man 3	Released: February 12, 2010; Label: D4L; Hosted by DJ Scream; Retail Mixtape
Bowen Homes Carlos (Gangsta Grillz)	Released: August 17, 2010; Label: D4L; Hosted by DJ Drama; Retail Mixtape
B.H.F. (Bankhead Forever)	Released: June 10, 2011; Label: D4L, G-Unit South, G-Unit; Hosted by DJ Greg Street; Retail Mixtape
Million Dollar Man	Released: July 4, 2012; Label: D4L, G-Unit South, G-Unit; Hosted by DJ Holiday
I'm Da Man 4	Released: February 26, 2013; Label: D4L, G-Unit South, G-Unit; Hosted by DJ Scream
King of Bankhead	Released: November 3, 2014; Label: D4L; Hosted by DJ Scream & DJ Swamp Izzo
Built Not Bought	Released: May 26, 2016; Label: D4L; Hosted by DJ Scream

== Singles ==
=== As lead artist ===
List of singles, with selected chart positions, showing year released and album name
Title	Year	Peak chart positions			Album
Title	Year	US	US R&B	US Rap	Album
"Dey Know"	2007	31	8	3	Units in the City
"Dunn Dunn"	2008	—	62	—	Units in the City
"Foolish"	2008	102	29	13	Units in the City
"Atlanta, GA" (featuring The-Dream, Ludacris and Gucci Mane)	2010	—	37	27	Fright Night
"Pocahontas" (featuring Twista and Wale)	2011	—	119	—	B.H.F. (Bankhead Forever)
"W.T.F." (featuring Lil Wayne)	2011	—	—	—	Million Dollar Man
"New Money" (featuring Cash Out and Young Scooter)	2014	—	—	—	I'm Da Man 4
"My Love" (featuring Lyfe Jennings)	2017	—	—	—	Rico
"—" denotes a recording that did not chart.

=== As featured artist ===
List of singles, with selected chart positions, showing year released and album name
Title	Year	Peak chart positions			Album
Title	Year	US	US R&B	US Rap	Album
"Money" (Capone-N-Noreaga featuring Shawty Lo)	2008	—	—	—	non-album single
"2 Sides" (Killer Mike featuring Shawty Lo)	2008	—	—	—	I Pledge Allegiance to the Grind II
"So Fly" (Slim featuring Shawty Lo and Yung Joc)	2008	49	8	18	Love's Crazy
"Break Ya Ankles" (E-40 featuring Shawty Lo)	2008	—	90	—	The Ball Street Journal
"We Be Getting Money" (Juvenile featuring Shawty Lo, Dorrough and Kango Slim)	2009	—	—	—	Cocky & Confident
"Get Like Me" (J. Luciano featuring Shawty Lo)	2010	—	—	—	Make Em Mad
"Going Off" (King featuring Shawty Lo)	2011	—	—	—	non-album singles
"Haters" (Tony Yayo featuring 50 Cent, Shawty Lo and Roscoe Dash)	2011	—	105	—	non-album singles
"Eye Candy" (Jae'D Hines featuring Shawty Lo)	2011	—	—	—	non-album singles
"Main Event" (Ron Browz featuring Shawty Lo)	2011	—	—	—	non-album singles
"Money Shower" (Jurrarri featuring Ashle and Shawty Lo)	2012	—	—	—	Rubber Band Rrarri
"I Got Mo (Remix)" (Rock Dillon featuring OJ da Juiceman and Shawty Lo)	2013	—	—	—	non-album single
"—" denotes a recording that did not chart.

== Other charted songs ==
List of songs, with selected chart positions, showing year released and album name
Title	Year	Peak chart positions	Album
Title	Year	US R&B	Album
"Gucci Bandanna" (Soulja Boy Tell 'Em featuring Shawty Lo and Gucci Mane)	2008	89	iSouljaBoyTellem
"Supplier" (featuring Trey Songz and Lil Wayne)	2009	108	Shawty Balboa

== Guest appearances ==
2008

- "WOW (Remix)" (Kia Shine featuring Shawty Lo & Streetknok)
- "This Is The Life (Remix)" (Rick Ross featuring Shawty Lo, Triple C's, Flo Rida, Brisco & Baby)
- "My Bumper (Remix)" (Cene featuring Shawty Lo)
- "Born & Raised" (GhostWridah featuring Shawty Lo)
- "Money" (Capone-n-Noreaga featuring Shawty Lo)
- "My Way" (Kieran featuring Shawty Lo & Yung Joc)
- "So Fly (Remix)" (Slim featuring Shawty Lo & Yung Joc)
- "Gucci Bandanna" (Soulja Boy Tell 'Em featuring Gucci Mane & Shawty Lo) iSouljaBoyTellEm
- "Break Ya Ankles" (E-40 featuring Shawty Lo) The Ball Street Journal
- "Final Warning" (DJ Khaled featuring Bun B, Bloodraw, Ace Hood, Brisco, Lil' Scrappy, Bali, Rock City, & Shawty Lo) We Global
- "2 Sides" (Killer Mike featuring Shawty Lo) I Pledge Allegiance to the Grind II
- "Icey" (Baby D featuring Gucci Mane & Shawty Lo) A-Town Secret Weapon

2009

- "Perfect Woman" (Masspike Miles featuring Shawty Lo)
- "Let Me Do My Thang" (Mims featuring Shawty Lo)
- "17.5 (Remix)" (Block Life featuring E-40 & Shawty Lo)
- "20 Dollars (Remix)" (Ron Browz featuring Mase, OJ da Juiceman, Jim Jones, & Shawty Lo)
- "We Be Gettin' Money" (Juvenile featuring Dorrough & Shawty Lo) Cocky & Confient
- "About My B.I." (Mýa with Shawty Lo) Beauty & the Streets Vol. 1

2010

- "That's The Way The Game Goes" (Game featuring Shawty Lo)
- "Coca Coca" (Gucci Mane featuring Rocko, OJ da Juiceman, Waka Flocka Flame, Shawty Lo, Yo Gotti & Nicki Minaj) Burrrprint (2) HD
- "Get Big (Remix)" (Dorrough, featuring DJ Drama, Diddy, Yo Gotti, Bun B, Diamond, Shawty Lo, Wiz Khalifa & Maino)

2011

- "Haters" (Tony Yayo, featuring 50 Cent, Shawty Lo, Roscoe Dash)
- "Wet" (Remix) (Snoop Dogg featuring Jim Jones & Shawty Lo)
- "Hood Shit" Trae tha Truth featuring Shawty Lo & Yung Quis) Street King
- "Bigger Picture" (Future featuring Shawty Lo) True Story

2012

- "36 0's" - (Chopper City featuring Shawty Lo) Louisiana Purchase
- "Cry Baby" - (Genesis featuring Shawty Lo) Black Belt
- "Money Shower" - (Jurrarri featuring Ashle and Shawty Lo) Rubber Band Rrarri
- "Solo" - (Waka Flocka Flame featuring Shawty Lo) Salute Me or Shoot Me 4 (Banned from America)
- "MVP" - (Gucci Mane featuring Rocko & Shawty Lo) Gucci 3D
- "Last Call" - (Yung Joc featuring Shawty Lo and Yung Ralph) Bitch I'm Joc
- "Pile Up" - (Chubbie Baby featuring Big Zak, Shawty Lo & Bleu Davinci) 36 Oz, Part 2

2013

- "On Me" - (Strap Da Fool featuring Shawty Lo) All In
- "Tell Em' That" - (Gucci Mane featuring Shawty Lo & Peewee Longway) Trap House III
- "Solo" - (Dorrough featuring Waka Flocka Flame & Shawty Lo) Shut the City Down
