= Total Club Hits =

Compilation album by Various artists
- Released: June 10, 2008
- Genre: Dance, hip hop, R&B
- Label: Thrive

Series chronology
Total Club Hits (2008)	Total Club Hits 2 (2009)

Total Club Hits is a compilation album released on June 10, 2008. This is the first album in the Total Club Hits series.

== Track listing ==
No.	Title	Music	Length
1.	"Cyclone"	Baby Bash feat. T-Pain	3:31
2.	"Ching-a-Ling"	Missy Elliott	3:32
3.	"Dey Know"	Shawty Lo	2:58
4.	"What You Know"	T.I.	4:12
5.	"Lean wit It, Rock wit It"	Dem Franchize Boyz feat. Lil Peanut and Charlay	3:33
6.	"Walk It Out"	Unk	2:34
7.	"Independent"	Webbie feat. Lil' Boosie	3:50
8.	"Umbrella" (Travis Barker Remix)	Rihanna feat. Jay-Z	4:21
9.	"Sexy Lady"	Yung Berg	2:43
10.	"Like This"	MIMS	3:20
11.	"Wall to Wall"	Chris Brown	2:58
12.	"Superstar"	Lupe Fiasco feat. Matthew Santos	4:26
13.	"Hypnotized"	Plies feat. Akon	2:42
14.	"Last Night"	Diddy feat. Keyshia Cole	3:56
15.	"Whine Up"	Kat DeLuna feat. Elephant Man	3:15
16.	"Low"	Flo Rida feat. T-Pain	3:50

All of the tracks included in this album were mixed by DJ Skribble and DJ Slynkee.
