= Total Club Hits 2 =

Compilation album by Various artists
- Released: January 6, 2009
- Genre: Dance, hip hop, R&B
- Length: 54:25
- Label: Thrive

Series chronology
Total Club Hits (2008)	Total Club Hits 2 (2009)	Total Club Hits 3 (2009)

Total Club Hits 2 is a compilation album released on January 6, 2009. This is the second album in the Total Club Hits series.

== Track listing ==
No.	Title	Music	Length
1.	"Whatever You Like" (Skribble & Acid's Rock Mix feat. Dave Navarro)	T.I.	4:13
2.	"Bust It Baby pt. 2"	Plies feat. Ne-Yo	3:34
3.	"Sexy Can I"	Ray J feat. Yung Berg	3:03
4.	"What Is It"	Baby Bash feat. Sean Kingston	3:29
5.	"American Boy"	Estelle feat. Kanye West	3:58
6.	"Killa"	Cherish feat. Yung Joc	3:00
7.	"Shawty Get Loose"	Lil Mama feat. Chris Brown and T-Pain	3:08
8.	"Lolli Lolli (Pop That Body)"	Three Six Mafia	3:44
9.	"In the Ayer" (Poet Name Life Mix)	Flo Rida feat. will.i.am	3:15
10.	"Krazy"	Pitbull	3:00
11.	"Love In This Club"	Usher feat. Young Jeezy	4:15
12.	"Get Silly"	V.I.C.	2:39
13.	"Marco Polo"	Bow Wow feat. Soulja Boy Tell 'Em	2:45
14.	"Lookin Boy"	Hotstylz feat. Yung Joc	2:36
15.	"Foolish"	Shawty Lo	3:49
16.	"Green Light"	John Legend feat. André 3000	3:57

All of the tracks included in this album were mixed by DJ Skribble and DJ Slynkee.
