= A-Town Secret Weapon =

Studio album by Baby D
- Released: April 29, 2008
- Recorded: 2006–08
- Studio: The Kush House
- Genre: Southern hip hop
- Length: 52:36
- Label: Big Oomp; Koch
- Producer: DJ Montay; Freddy B; Joe Durty; Malcolm XX; MC Assault; Mr. Jonz

Baby D chronology
Lil' Chopper Toy (2002)	A-Town Secret Weapon (2008)

Singles from A-Town Secret Weapon
- 1. "I'm Bout Money" Released: 2008

Professional ratings
Review scores
Source	Rating
AllMusic	3/5 stars
RapReviews	5.5/10

A-Town Secret Weapon is the third studio album by American Atlanta-based rapper Baby D. It was released on April 29, 2008, through Big Oomp/Koch Records. Recording sessions took place at The Kush House. Production was handled by DJ Montay, MC Assault, Freddy B, Joe Durty, Malcolm XX and Mr. Jonz. It features guest appearances from Blazed, BackBone, DJ Jelly, Escobar, Gucci Mane, Loko, Pastor Troy, Sandman, Sean P and Shawty Lo.

The album did not reach the US Billboard 200, however, it peaked at No. 53 on the Top R&B/Hip-Hop Albums, No. 22 on the Top Rap Albums and No. 25 on the Heatseekers Albums.

The first single from the album is "I'm Bout Money", which made it to No. 97 on the Hot R&B/Hip-Hop Songs. A video of the song has been released on March 20, 2008. Surprisingly the track "Yuuugh!", which was meant to be the first single off the album, didn't make it to the final track list.

== Track listing ==
No.	Title	Writer(s)	Producer(s)	Length
1.	"Intro" (featuring DJ Jelly)		DJ Montay	0:56
2.	"U Gotta Love It"	Donald B. Jenkins; Montay Humphrey; Korey Roberson; Howard Simmons	DJ Montay	3:22
3.	"Big Boy Whips"	Jenkins; Humphrey; Roberson; Simmons; Anthony Platt	DJ Montay	3:30
4.	"I'm Bout Money" (featuring Blazed)	Jenkins; Humphrey; Roberson; Simmons; Platt; Fard Shahid; J. Williams	DJ Montay; MC Assault	3:06
5.	"So Fresh" (featuring Sandman and BackBone)	Jenkins; Humphrey; Roberson; Simmons; J. Williams; T. Carter	DJ Montay	3:25
6.	"Icey" (featuring Shawty Lo and Gucci Mane)	Jenkins; Humphrey; Roberson; Simmons; William Jones	DJ Montay; Mr. Jonz	4:06
7.	"Patron"	Jenkins; Humphrey; Roberson; Simmons; Shahid	DJ Montay	3:52
8.	"Do It"	Jenkins; Humphrey; Roberson; Simmons	DJ Montay	3:07
9.	"Get to It"	Jenkins; Humphrey; Roberson; Simmons; J. Daniels	DJ Montay; Joe Durty	3:13
10.	"Get It Girl" (featuring Blazed)	Jenkins; Humphrey; Roberson; Simmons; J. Ishman; W. Thomas; N. Monroe	DJ Montay; MC Assault	4:05
11.	"Put'em Up" (featuring Pastor Troy and Sean P.)	Jenkins; Humphrey; Roberson; Simmons; F. Hall; Micah Troy	DJ Montay; MC Assault; Freddy B	4:22
12.	"One 4 tha Money"	Jenkins; Humphrey; Roberson; Simmons	DJ Montay	4:09
13.	"Girls Gone Wild" (featuring Blazed)	Jenkins; Humphrey; Roberson; Simmons; J. Ishman; W. Thomas; N. Monroe	DJ Montay; Malcom XX	3:41
14.	"Get Out" (featuring Escobar and Loko)	Jenkins; Humphrey; Roberson; Simmons; L. Scott; Platt	DJ Montay	3:56
15.	"For My Niggas"	Jenkins; Humphrey; Roberson; Simmons; Shahid	DJ Montay	3:46
Total length:				52:36

== Charts ==
Chart (2008)	Peak position
US Heatseekers Albums (Billboard)	25
US Top R&B/Hip-Hop Albums (Billboard)	53
US Top Rap Albums (Billboard)	22
