= BBNG2 =

Studio album by BADBADNOTGOOD
- Released: April 3, 2012
- Recorded: 2012
- Studio: Revolution Recording (Toronto)
- Genres: Nu jazz; instrumental hip hop; electronica
- Length: 60:55
- Label: Self-released

BADBADNOTGOOD chronology
BBNGLive 2 (2012)	BBNG2 (2012)	III (2014)

Singles from BBNG2
- 1. "Flashing Lights" / "UWM" Released: January 18, 2013

Professional ratings
Review scores
Source	Rating
Indie Current	(very positive)
Prefix Mag	8.5/10 stars

BBNG2 is the second studio album from Canadian music group BADBADNOTGOOD. It was made available on April 3, 2012, via the band's website as a free download in various formats. The album is a mixture of original compositions and covers of Earl Sweatshirt (track 1), Feist (track 4), Tyler, The Creator and Gucci Mane (track 5), James Blake (tracks 4 and 9), Kanye West (track 10), and My Bloody Valentine (track 11). It received generally very positive reviews.

== Production and release ==
Following their prolific first year as a band, which saw the release of the viral Odd Future Sessions, an EP, two live albums, and their debut album BBNG, the group self-released their sophomore album on April 3, 2012. The group made the album available for free download online.

The entire album was recorded in one ten hour recording session at Revolution Recordings in Toronto, with the group making a note that "no one above the age of 21 was involved in the making of this album." The album included more original material than their first album as well as reworked versions of the previously released songs "Rotten Decay" and "Bastard/Lemonade." This album also contained two collaborative tracks, one featuring Luan Phung and the other with future band member Leland Whitty.

== Reception ==
BBNG2 received more mainstream coverage than any of the band's previous releases, including features in The Guardian's New Band of the Week and NPR's Song of the Day. The album received positive critical reviews, with Prefix Mag calling the album a "decisive turning point" and Anthony Fantano of The Needle Drop celebrating the band's new sounds and strong improvisations and solos, saying that they were "doing fantastic things for jazz;" he gave the album a 9/10 review, his second-highest rated album of the year.

Some jazz critics took offense to the band's irreverence toward jazz tradition and accused them of being over-hyped relative to their experience and technical proficiency. Others went as far as to debate the band's right to play and call themselves jazz. Some commentators in the jazz scene, however, like musician Brownman Ali and critic Anthony Dean-Harris, came to the band's defense, with the latter stating, "They have all the attributes of a real cutting edge jazz band who can once again make us all rethink what this genre is capable of doing, being, becoming, and encompassing."

== Track listing ==
Credits adapted from Bandcamp.

No.	Title	Writer(s)	Length
1.	"Earl (feat. Leland Whitty)" (Earl Sweatshirt cover)	Thebe Kgositsile, Tyler Okonma	3:38
2.	"Vices"	Matthew Tavares, Chester Hansen, Alexander Sowinski	4:40
3.	"Rotten Decay"	Tavares, Hansen, Sowinski	6:31
4.	"Limit to Your Love" (Feist cover)	Feist, Jason "Gonzales" Charles Beck	4:30
5.	"Bastard/Lemonade" (Tyler, the Creator / Gucci Mane cover)	Okonma, Radric Davis, Shondrae Crawford	7:04
6.	"CHSTR"	Tavares, Hansen, Sowinski	5:25
7.	"UWM (feat. Leland Whitty)"	Tavares, Hansen, Sowinski	6:02
8.	"DMZ"	Tavares, Hansen, Sowinski	5:12
9.	"CMYK" (James Blake cover)	James Blake, Pharrell Williams, Chad Hugo, Stephen Garrett, Timothy Mosley	5:16
10.	"Flashing Lights" (Kanye West cover)	Kanye West, Eric Hudson	7:16
11.	"You Made Me Realise (feat. Luan Phung)" (My Bloody Valentine cover)	Kevin Shields	5:21
Total length:			60:55

== Personnel ==
BADBADNOTGOOD

- Matthew Tavares - keyboards
- Chester Hansen - bass guitar, upright bass
- Alexander Sowinski - drums, sampler

Other music

- Leland Whitty - saxophone (tracks 1 & 7)
- Luan Phung - electric guitar (track 11)

Technical

- Matthew Tavares - mixing, mastering
- Matt MacNeil - engineer, mixing, mastering
- Jack Clow - engineer

Artwork

- Connor Olthuis - photography, art design
- Sam Zaret - art design
