= List of number-one digital songs of 2006 (U.S.) =

2006 highest-selling digital singles in the United States

The highest-selling digital singles in the United States are ranked in the Hot Digital Songs chart, published by Billboard magazine. The data are compiled by Nielsen SoundScan based on each single's weekly digital sales, which combines sales of different versions of a single for a summarized figure.

== Chart history ==
Key
†	Indicates best-charting digital song of 2006

Issue date	Song	Artist(s)	Weekly sales	Ref(s)
January 7	"Laffy Taffy"	D4L	54,000	
January 14	"Laffy Taffy"	D4L	175,000	
January 21	"Dirty Little Secret"	The All-American Rejects		
January 28	"Check on It"	Beyoncé featuring Slim Thug	61,000	
February 4	"Check on It"	Beyoncé featuring Slim Thug		
February 11	"Breaking Free"	Zac Efron and Vanessa Hudgens	82,000	
February 18	"You're Beautiful"	James Blunt	104,500	
February 25	"You're Beautiful"	James Blunt		
March 4	"You're Beautiful"	James Blunt		
March 11	"You're Beautiful"	James Blunt		
March 18	"So Sick"	Ne-Yo	120,000	
March 25	"So Sick"	Ne-Yo		
April 1	"Bad Day" †	Daniel Powter	106,500	
April 8	"Bad Day" †	Daniel Powter		
April 15	"Bad Day" †	Daniel Powter		
April 22	"Bad Day" †	Daniel Powter		
April 29	"Bad Day" †	Daniel Powter		
May 6	"Bad Day" †	Daniel Powter		
May 13	"SOS"	Rihanna	169,500	
May 20	"SOS"	Rihanna		
May 27	"SOS"	Rihanna		
June 3	"Bad Day"	Daniel Powter		
June 10	"Promiscuous"	Nelly Furtado featuring Timbaland	96,500	
June 17	"Hips Don't Lie"	Shakira featuring Wyclef Jean	266,500	
June 24	"Hips Don't Lie"	Shakira featuring Wyclef Jean		
July 1	"Hips Don't Lie"	Shakira featuring Wyclef Jean		
July 8	"Promiscuous"	Nelly Furtado featuring Timbaland	140,000	
July 15	"Promiscuous"	Nelly Furtado featuring Timbaland		
July 22	"Promiscuous"	Nelly Furtado featuring Timbaland	99,000	
July 29	"Crazy"	Gnarls Barkley	90,000	
August 5	"Crazy"	Gnarls Barkley		
August 12	"Crazy"	Gnarls Barkley		
August 19	"London Bridge"	Fergie	114,000	
August 26	"London Bridge"	Fergie		
September 2	"London Bridge"	Fergie		
September 9	"SexyBack"	Justin Timberlake	250,000	
September 16	"SexyBack"	Justin Timberlake		
September 23	"SexyBack"	Justin Timberlake	159,000	
September 30	"SexyBack"	Justin Timberlake	172,000	
October 7	"SexyBack"	Justin Timberlake		
October 14	"How to Save a Life"	The Fray	89,000	
October 21	"Lips of an Angel"	Hinder		
October 28	"Lips of an Angel"	Hinder	75,000	
November 4	"Smack That"	Akon featuring Eminem	91,500	
November 11	"My Love"	Justin Timberlake featuring T.I.		
November 18	"My Love"	Justin Timberlake featuring T.I.		
November 25	"Fergalicious"	Fergie featuring will.i.am		
December 2	"I Wanna Love You"	Akon featuring Snoop Dogg	146,000	
December 9	"I Wanna Love You"	Akon featuring Snoop Dogg		
December 16	"Irreplaceable"	Beyoncé	96,000	
December 23	"Fergalicious"	Fergie featuring will.i.am		
December 30	"Irreplaceable"	Beyoncé	88,000	

== See also ==
- 2006 in music
- Hot Digital Songs
