= Show Out (Unk song) =

Single by Unk

from the album 2econd Season
- Released: September 9, 2008 (U.S.)
- Recorded: 2008
- Genre: Southern hip hop
- Length: 3:35
- Label: Big Oomp Records / Koch Records
- Producer(s): DJ Montay

Unk singles chronology
"Hit the Dance Floor" (2007)	"Show Out" (2008)	"In Yo Face" (2008)

"Show Out" is the first single from rapper Unk's second album, 2econd Season. It is produced by DJ Montay.

== Music video ==
Cameo appearances are made by SODMG rappers V.I.C., Soulja Boy Tell 'Em, Arab, JBar, and Chilli of TLC and her son Tron. The video was shot at Movies ATL, a movie theater in Atlanta, Georgia.

== Remixes ==
On November 26, 2008, an official remix was released with the song featuring Soulja Boy Tell 'Em, Sean Kingston, Jim Jones, and E-40. Jim Jones has appeared on the remixes to "Walk It Out" and "2 Step," the latter of which E-40 was also featured on. It is also available on DJ Envy's mixtape, "Codeine Overdose 2"

== Charts ==
Chart (2008)	Peak position
U.S. Billboard Hot R&B/Hip-Hop Songs	46
U.S. Billboard Hot Rap Tracks	17
