= 2econd Season =

Studio album by Unk
- Released: September 30, 2008
- Recorded: 2007–2008
- Genre: Southern hip hop
- Length: 1:01:42
- Label: Big Oomp; Koch
- Producer: DJ Montay; Malcolm X; MC Assault; Mr. Jonz

Unk chronology
Beat'n Down Yo Block! (2006)	2econd Season (2008)

Singles from 2econd Season
- 1. "Show Out" Released: September 2008

Professional ratings
Review scores
Source	Rating
HipHopDX	2.5/5
RapReviews	5/10

2econd Season is the second and final studio album by Atlanta-based American rapper Unk. It was released on September 30, 2008 through Big Oomp Records and Koch Records. Production was handled by DJ Montay, Mr. Jonz, MC Assault and Malcolm X. It features guest appearances from Blazed, 11 Dub, D'Angel, Loko, Manish Man, Princess, Project Pat, Ray J, Sandman, Sean Kingston, Stuey Rock, Three 6 Mafia and Ying Yang Twins. The album peaked at number 104 on the Billboard 200, number 15 on the Top R&B/Hip-Hop Albums, number 6 on the Top Rap Albums, and topped the Heatseekers Albums charts in the United States.

== Track listing ==
No.	Title	Writer(s)	Producer(s)	Length
1.	"Intro"		DJ Montay; Mr. Jonz	0:32
2.	"On My Shit"	Anthony Platt; Montay Humphrey; Howard Simmons; Korey Roberson; Fard Shahid	DJ Montay	4:50
3.	"That's Right"	Platt; Humphrey; Simmons; Roberson; Shahid	DJ Montay	3:26
4.	"Show Out"	Platt; Humphrey; Simmons; Roberson	DJ Montay	3:35
5.	"Like Wham" (featuring Stuey Rock and Sandman)	Platt; Joshua Allen Nicks; T. Carter; Humphrey; Simmons; Roberson; William Jones	DJ Montay; Mr. Jonz; MC Assault	3:45
6.	"Wet Wet" (featuring Project Pat and Three 6 Mafia)	Platt; Patrick Houston; Paul Beauregard; Jordan Houston; Humphrey; Simmons; Roberson; Jones	DJ Montay; Mr. Jonz; MC Assault	4:02
7.	"She Freaky" (featuring Ray J and Blazed)	Platt; Humphrey; Simmons; Roberson; Jones	DJ Montay; Mr. Jonz; MC Assault	3:50
8.	"Beat Dat Azz" (featuring Manish Man, 11 Dub, Loko and Princess)	Platt; Humphrey; Simmons; Roberson	DJ Montay; MC Assault	6:05
9.	"In Yo Face"	Platt; Humphrey; Simmons; Roberson; M. Middleton	DJ Montay; MC Assault; Malcolm X	3:27
10.	"Make It"	Platt; Humphrey; Simmons; Roberson; Jones	DJ Montay; Mr. Jonz	3:26
11.	"Where My Ladies At" (featuring Blazed)	Platt; Humphrey; Simmons; Roberson; Jones	DJ Montay; Mr. Jonz; MC Assault	3:23
12.	"Sweep Da Flo" (featuring Ying Yang Twins)	Platt; D'eongelo Holmes; Eric Jackson; Humphrey; Simmons; Roberson	DJ Montay	2:45
13.	"You Can Do It"	Platt; Humphrey; Simmons; Roberson	DJ Montay	3:28
14.	"You're the One" (featuring Sean Kingston and D'Angel)	Platt; Kisean Anderson; Michelle Downer; Humphrey; Simmons; Roberson	DJ Montay	3:11
15.	"Round & Round" (featuring Blazed)	Platt; Humphrey; Simmons; Roberson; Shahid	DJ Montay	4:49
16.	"Main Attraction"	Platt; Humphrey; Simmons; Roberson; Jones; Shahid	DJ Montay; Mr. Jonz	3:51
17.	"Make You Move"	Platt; Humphrey; Simmons; Roberson	DJ Montay; MC Assault	3:17
Total length:				1:01:42

== Charts ==
Chart (2008)	Peak position
US Billboard 200	104
US Top R&B/Hip-Hop Albums (Billboard)	15
US Heatseekers Albums (Billboard)	1
