= Last 2 Walk =

Studio album by Three 6 Mafia
- Released: June 24, 2008
- Recorded: 2007–08
- Genre: Hip-hop
- Length: 71:39
- Labels: Hypnotize Minds; Columbia
- Producers: DJ Paul (also exec.); Juicy J (also exec.); Akon; Dead Executives; DJ Montay; Superpower

Three 6 Mafia chronology
Most Known Hits (2005)	Last 2 Walk (2008)

Deluxe Edition cover

Singles from Last 2 Walk
- 1. "Lolli Lolli (Pop That Body)" Released: March 11, 2008; 2. "I'd Rather" Released: April 1, 2008; 3. "That's Right" Released: July 19, 2008

Professional ratings
Aggregate scores
Source	Rating
Metacritic	56/100
Review scores
Source	Rating
AllMusic	3/5 stars
HipHopDX	3.5/5
MSN Music	C
Pitchfork	6.7/10
RapReviews	7/10
Rolling Stone	3.5/5 stars
The Austin Chronicle	1/5 stars
The A.V. Club	C
The Phoenix	2/4 stars
Tiny Mix Tapes	2.5/5 marks

Last 2 Walk is the ninth studio album by American hip-hop group Three 6 Mafia. It was released on June 24, 2008, by Hypnotize Minds and Columbia Records. Production was handled mostly by the last two remaining members, DJ Paul and Juicy J, as well as Akon, Dead Executives, DJ Montay, and Superpower, with co-producer Giorgio Tuinfort. It features guest appearances from Project Pat, UGK, 8Ball & MJG, Akon, Al Kapone, DJ Spanish Fly, Good Charlotte, Lil Wyte, Lyfe Jennings, Unk, Superpower, and Young D.

The album peaked at number 5 on the Billboard 200, number 2 on both the Top R&B/Hip-Hop Albums and Top Rap Albums, and number 6 on the Tastemaker Albums in the United States.

The album was named Last 2 Walk because DJ Paul and Juicy J were the last two members remaining in Three 6 Mafia. Crunchy Black left the group in late 2006 because of money disputes. "Doe Boy Fresh", featuring Chamillionaire, released on January 2, 2007, as a digital download, was intended to be the first single but was ultimately cut from the album. The album's lead single, "Lolli Lolli (Pop That Body)", reached number 18 on the Billboard Hot 100.

== Critical reception ==
Last 2 Walk was met with mixed or average reviews from music critics. At Metacritic, which assigns a normalised rating out of 100 to reviews from mainstream publications, the album received an average score of 56, based on thirteen reviews.

Steve 'Flash' Juon of RapReviews recommended the album for "those who can get past their banal lyricism, because between the beats and the guest stars on this album they've got a winning combination anyway". Jody Rosen of Rolling Stone found "every track is compelling, with synthesized strings and the usual depth-sounder bass lines inflated with reverb into miniature symphonies". Tom Breihan of Pitchfork wrote: "somewhere on the way to novelty-fame, Three 6 Mafia lost something, and these days they sound like they're just going through the motions".

In a mixed review, AllMusic's David Jeffries stated: "there's no evidence Three 6 had a fully formed Most Known Unknown-styled album in them either, so consider the uneven Last 2 Walk a fair and necessary placeholder effort with a bit of 'back to basics' thrown in to satisfy the faithful". Robert Christgau of MSN Music wrote: "it's easy out there for an Oscar winner, but you'd never know it from these entertainment moguls, who pretend or report that they're still investing in mayhem, misogyny and sales careers whose main drawback is that they can get you arrested". Andy Battaglia of The A.V. Club resumed: "but for all the intricacy on display in the production, the vocals just aren't there". Daniel Brockman of The Boston Phoenix concluded "a club-banging record, but it's hard to recommend something so by-the-book". Ajitpaul Mangat of Tiny Mix Tapes wrote: "Three 6 Mafia's aspiration to evolve seems to have manifested itself on Last 2 Walk, from production to sound to lyrics. Having taken their novel sound to its lofty limits, it is time for the group to change and progress towards another musical frontier. However, their aspirations of progressing by melding Hollywood and the hood have largely failed".

In negative reviews, Chase Hoffberger of The Austin Chronicle stated: "save for Lyfe Jennings' refreshing cues on 'Hood Star', there's nothing original about Last 2 Walk".

== Track listing ==
No.	Title	Producer(s)	Length
1.	"Intro"	DJ Paul; Juicy J	1:07
2.	"I Told 'Em"	DJ Paul; Juicy J	3:21
3.	"Trap Boom" (featuring Project Pat)	DJ Paul; Juicy J	3:08
4.	"Playstation"	DJ Paul; Juicy J	4:04
5.	"I Got" (featuring Pimp C & Project Pat)	DJ Paul; Juicy J	3:47
6.	"I'd Rather" (featuring Unk)	DJ Montay; DJ Paul^{[a]}; Juicy J^{[a]}	4:47
7.	"That's Right" (featuring Akon)	Akon; Giorgio Tuinfort^{[a]}	2:56
8.	"Corner Man"	DJ Paul; Juicy J	3:07
9.	"Weed, Blow, Pills"	DJ Paul; Juicy J	3:29
10.	"DSX Talk"	DJ Paul; Juicy J	0:44
11.	"Hood Star" (featuring Lyfe Jennings)	DJ Paul; Juicy J	3:09
12.	"Get Ya Rob" (featuring Project Pat)	DJ Paul; Juicy J	3:46
13.	"On Some Chrome" (featuring UGK)	DJ Paul; Juicy J	4:13
14.	"Rollin'" (featuring Lil' Wyte)	DJ Paul; Juicy J	3:37
15.	"Click Bang"	DJ Paul; Juicy J	3:36
16.	"My Own Way" (featuring Good Charlotte)	Dead Executives	3:31
17.	"Dirty Bitch" (featuring Project Pat)	DJ Paul; Juicy J	3:26
18.	"First 48" (featuring Project Pat, DJ Spanish Fly, Al Kapone, 8Ball & MJG)	DJ Paul; Juicy J	4:34
19.	"Outro"	DJ Paul; Juicy J	3:16
Total length:			63:38

Deluxe Edition bonus tracks
No.	Title	Producer(s)	Length
20.	"Lolli Lolli (Pop That Body) Intro"		0:16
21.	"Lolli Lolli (Pop That Body)" (featuring Project Pat, Young D & Superpower)	Darin "Superpower" Baker; DJ Paul^{[a]}; Juicy J^{[a]}	4:11
22.	"My Own Way (Remix)" (featuring Good Charlotte)	Dead Executives; DJ Paul^{[a]}; Juicy J^{[a]}	3:34
Total length:			71:39

Japanese bonus tracks
No.	Title	Length
23.	"Sell Dope"	2:57
24.	"Built Like Dat" (featuring Project Pat)	4:10
Total length:		78:46

iTunes bonus tracks
No.	Title	Length
23.	"Bunch of Dat"	3:01
24.	"Built Like Dat" (featuring Project Pat)	4:10
Total length:		78:50

Notes

- ^{^[a]} signifies a co-producer

Sample credits

- Track 5 contains samples from "Kernkraft 400" by Zombie Nation

== Charts ==
=== Weekly charts ===
Chart (2008)	Peak position
US Billboard 200	5
US Top R&B/Hip-Hop Albums (Billboard)	2
US Indie Store Album Sales (Billboard)	6

=== Year-end charts ===
Chart (2008)	Position
US Billboard 200	153
US Top R&B/Hip-Hop Albums (Billboard)	53
