= The Appeal: Georgia's Most Wanted =

Studio album by Gucci Mane
- Released: September 28, 2010
- Recorded: 2009–10
- Genre: Southern hip-hop
- Length: 61:37
- Label: 1017 Brick Squad; Asylum; Warner Bros.; WMGreen
- Producer: Radric "Gucci Mane" Davis (exec.); The Neptunes; Swizz Beatz; DJ B-Do; Joey French; Drumma Boy; Zaytoven; Schife & OhZee; The Individualz; Fatboi; Lex Luger; G-Luck; Rob Holladay; The Inkredibles; J.U.S.T.I.C.E. League; Jim Jonsin; Pharrell Williams; Shawty Redd

Gucci Mane chronology
Buy My Album (2010)	The Appeal: Georgia's Most Wanted (2010)	Gucci 2 Time (2011)

Singles from The Appeal: Georgia's Most Wanted
- 1. "Gucci Time" Released: August 30, 2010

The Appeal: Georgia's Most Wanted is the seventh studio album by American rapper Gucci Mane. It was released on September 28, 2010, by 1017 Brick Squad Records, Warner Bros. Records and Asylum Records. It serves as a sequel to his previous studio release The State vs. Radric Davis (2009), which was released after the Atlanta rapper's incarceration from prison. The album debuted at number 4 on the US Billboard 200, with first-week sales of 61,450 copies; it has sold an estimated 169,500 copies as of the week ending of August 21, 2011.

== Background ==
In November 2009, Gucci Mane was sentenced to 12 months imprisonment in Georgia's Fulton County Jail. In May 2010, after the rapper was released from prison, he released these series of mixtapes, tracks and viral videos. These works include "The Burrrprint 2", "Mr. Zone 6", "Jewelry Selection", "Ferrari Music", "Buy My Album" and a collaboration with Diplo (DJ), called "Free Gucci". He then announced that he changed the name of his label into making it a new one, called 1017 Brick Squad Records. He also announced the title to his next album, called The State vs. Radric Davis: The Appeal, and it would be released for 2010. The title was changed to The Appeal: Georgia's Most Wanted, with a release date of August 31. Gucci Mane later announced on his Twitter, that the album would be released on a date of "Septemburrr 28, 2010" [sic].

=== Recording ===
During the interview with Atlanta's DJ Greg Street, Gucci Mane spoke about the album and said that it was a good representation upon where he is "musically and mentally". "I done grown a lot and I think I expressed it really good musically and I just want everybody to hear it and see what they think about it, because I put a lot of time in it and it's definitely my best foot forward right now. In addition to several of his longtime record producers such as Zaytoven, Shawty Redd, Drumma Boy and Fatboi, among others, Gucci Mane expanded his circle of producers for the album. The Appeal: Georgia's Most Wanted also includes his first-time that have collaborated with Swizz Beatz, former Haitian presidential candidate Wyclef Jean and Pharrell Williams. "The new people I did songs I actually made hit record with them. I made six records with Swizz, I made six records with Pharrell. And then I picked the best ones. I think this is a classic." With the completion of his follow-up album, Gucci Mane said that this is his best chance to capitalize on his underground allure. He told MTV that he considers this album to be a masterpiece. "The Appeal is officially finished. It's mixed and mastered, and the artwork is done. I'm just out here promoting it and letting everyone know it's coming. Just bring awareness to it 'cause I want everyone to know it's coming and to support it because it's a masterpiece."

== Release and promotion ==
In September 2010, Gucci Mane announced a promotional tour for The Appeal; since his release from jail, he has maintained his busy touring schedule and plans to continue his life on the road with appearances throughout the country: "I set out five years ago to be the #1 rapper in Hip-Hop. That journey continues with an even sharper focus."

On March 17, 2010, in the Burbank, California, Gucci Mane, 1017 Brick Squad Records, Asylum Records and Warner Bros. Records has announced these plans to release the first installment in a series of commercial mixtapes (Burrrprint (2) HD), which is a follow-up to the mixtape release of 2009. Burrrprint (2) HD was released April 12, 2010 on the iTunes Store and in stores the following day. The 24-track mixtape, hosted by DJ Holiday, is a mix of new songs and interludes. Featured artists include Trey Songz, Ludacris, Nicki Minaj, Rick Ross, DJ Khaled, Lil' Kim, Yo Gotti, Jim Jones and Gucci Mane's 1017 Brick Squad Records labelmates Waka Flocka Flame and OJ da Juiceman. This collection was the last music Gucci Mane recorded before his 2009 incarceration; its opening track, "Live From Fulton County Jail", was recorded over the phone from behind bars. "Gucci called me from Fulton County and told me to start recording," says DJ Holiday. "He busted a hot verse right there on the phone and that's what you hear on the record, with the 1-minute automated warning and all, 'you have one minute remaining', it's so real." "Many of my fans know me from the massive amounts of mixtapes I've released over the years," said Gucci Mane when he was serving his one-year sentence for a parole violation. "The Burrprint 2 mixtape is just something I wanted to put out there as a thank you for all those who have stuck by me through my incarceration, all those who have written letters, this is for you… I will be home soon."

The mixtape series preceded The Appeal: Georgia's Most Wanted. The Burrrprint (2) HD followed on the heels of DJ and producer Diplo's Free Gucci mixtape (a reworking of previous material from Gucci Mane's The Cold War mixtape series) and Gucci Mane's second full-length LP, The State vs. Radric Davis, which included the single "Wasted". Gucci Mane was busy after his release from prison. The rapper appeared at Atlanta radio station Hot 107.9's birthday party, filmed a video for Lil Wayne's "Steady Mobbin'", planned a collaboration with Drake and released another set of mixtapes (including Mr. Zone 6, which he told Mixtape Daily would be the "Mixtape of the Year"). "Biggest mixtape of the summer, by far," Gucci Mane said about his tape, an ode to the neighborhood in Atlanta where he grew up. "When y'all get it, guarantee I win Mixtape of the Year."

Jewelry Selection was released August 17, 2010. "Gucci Mane is out on the road, getting that show paper. Mr. LaFlare says he has to look his freshest for the people, which means an assortment of ice to shine, hence the name of his latest mixtape, Jewelry Selection." On September 9, Gucci Mane released another DJ Drama-assisted mixtape entitled Ferrari Music; a DJ Holiday-assisted mixtape entitled Buy My Album was released on September 23, 2010, five days before The Appeal was released.

=== Singles ===
On June 16, 2010, Gucci Mane and R&B singer Ciara went live on UStream to announce they would be featured on each other's new albums. Gucci Mane's "Too Hood" (featuring Ciara) was rumored to be the first single from The Appeal, but it did not appear on the album. The first single from the album, "Gucci Time", is produced by (and features) Swizz Beatz. The song premiered on Gucci Mane's MySpace page August 6, 2010, and was released as a single on August 30. It reached #23 on Billboard's Hot R&B/Hip-Hop Songs chart and number 12 on Billboard's Rap Songs. A promotional single from the album was "Remember When", featuring R&B singer Ray J. A music video was released on October 10, and a music video for "What's It Gonna Be" was released 21 days later.

=== Other songs ===
In a partnership with iTunes, there were several tracks from the new album that were included in its pre-release program "Complete My Album", during the weeks leading up to the album's release. The first offering of the program was "Making Love to the Money", which could be obtained on September 7, 2010. The song peaked at number 36 on the US Billboard Hot R&B-Hip-Hop Songs and on the Top Rap Songs at number 21. "Trap Talk" was then made available on September 14, 2010; the final offering, "Weirdo", became available on September 21. The track, titled "Beat It Up" featuring Trey Songz (a deluxe-edition track which also appears on Gucci Mane's Burrrprint (2) HD mixtape), debuted on the R&B/Hip-Hop Songs at number 36 and number 22 on the Top Rap Songs charts.

== Reception ==
=== Commercial performance ===
The album sold 61,500 copies in its first week (less than Gucci Mane's previous effort (which sold 90,000 copies in its first week of release). However, The Appeal had more chart success; it entered the US Billboard 200 at number 4 (the previous album entered at number 10). The Appeal entered at number 4 on both on the Top R&B/Hip Hop Albums and Top Rap charts. The album has sold 150,000 copies.

=== Critical reception ===
Professional ratings
Aggregate scores
Source	Rating
Metacritic	64/100
Review scores
Source	Rating
Allmusic	3.5/5 stars
Beat-Town	3/5 stars
Eye Weekly	4/5 stars
HipHopDX	3.5/5 stars
iHipHop	3.5/5 stars
RapReviews	(5/10)
Rolling Stone	3/5 stars

Upon its release, The Appeal: Georgia's Most Wanted received generally positive reviews from most music critics. Giving it three stars (out of five), Rolling Stone's Jonah Weiner commented "This Atlanta mush mouth serves up hip-hop comfort food: rich synth beats; laid-back cadences; songs that find a gloriously low concept and stick to it ('Making Love to the Money,' about all the different ways Gucci tries to impregnate his Benjamins, is a goofy standout here). But The Appeal, his third official album, suggests that Gucci's menu could use an update. Besides the distortion-laced 'Gucci Time,' the biggest change-ups here are drab gangsta ballads: 'Haterade' features Pharrell at his most insufferably croon-y, and 'O'Dog' makes you actually wish guest singer Wyclef would stick to politics."

AllMusic critic David Jeffries wrote that the album "is another worthy, aboveground effort, holding more highlights than your everyday release while broadening the man's horizons..."

Giving The Appeal three out of five stars, HipHopDX's William E. Ketchum III commented: "The Appeal: Georgia's Most Wanted is a big budget, guest-heavy release that distinguishes a Gucci Mane album from his endless supply of mixtapes. However, the Atlanta, Georgia mainstay still has yet to show the mainstream what the streets have been pointing out for the last five years."

Eye Weekly writer Dave Morris gave the album a 4-out-of-5 rating, stating that Gucci Mane "is back doing hoodrat stuff in the same ludicrous way as before."

== Track listing ==
Credits adapted from the Digital Booklet.

No.	Title	Writer(s)	Producer(s)	Length
1.	"Little Friend" (featuring Bun B)	Radric Davis; Bernard Freeman; Rodney Jerkins; Jabbar Stevens	Rodney "Darkchild" Jerkins; Jabbar "Bah" Stevens (co.)	5:18
2.	"Trap Talk"	Davis; Montay Humphrey; Korey Roberson, Jr.	Big Korey; DJ Montay (co.)	4:38
3.	"Missing" (featuring Sig H.B.)	Davis; Xavier Dotson	Zaytoven	4:46
4.	"What It's Gonna Be"	Davis; Christopher Gholson	Drumma Boy	4:23
5.	"Making Love to the Money"	Davis; Ian Lewis; Bazan O. Zayas	Schife; OhZee	4:07
6.	"Gucci Time" (featuring Swizz Beatz)	Davis; Kasseem Dean	Swizz Beatz	2:56
7.	"Party Animal"	Davis; LaDamon Douglas	Fatboi	3:59
8.	"Remember When" (featuring Ray J)	Davis; Demetrius Stewart; Brandon Whitfield; Willie Norwood, Jr	BWheezy; Shawty Redd (co.)	4:27
9.	"Haterade" (featuring Pharrell & Nicki Minaj)	Davis; Pharrell Williams; Onika Maraj	The Neptunes	4:46
10.	"It's Alive" (featuring Swizz Beatz)	Davis; Dean	Swizz Beatz	3:38
11.	"ODog" (featuring Wyclef)	Davis; Wyclef Jean; Sedeck Jean	Wyclef Jean; Sedeck Jean	5:15
12.	"Dollar Sign"	Davis; Jerry Duplessis; Arden Altino; LaDonnis Crump; Jayms Madison	Jerry "Wonda" Duplessis; Arden "Keyz" Altino (co.)	2:19
13.	"Brand New"	Davis; Dotson	Zaytoven	3:27
14.	"Weirdo"	Davis; Gholson	Drumma Boy	4:11
15.	"Grown Man" (featuring Estelle)	Davis; Duplessis; James Scheffer; Estelle Swaray; Wayne Wilkins	Jerry "Wonda" Duplessis; Jim Jonsin; Wayne Wilkins; Arden "Keyz" Altino (add.)	3:36
Total length:				61:37

iTunes bonus tracks
No.	Title	Writer(s)	Producer(s)	Length
16.	"Beat It Up" (featuring Trey Songz)	Davis; Gholson; Tremaine Neverson	Drumma Boy	4:32
17.	"Georgia's Most Wanted (Intro)"	Davis; Douglas	Fatboi	3:41
18.	"Gucci Mane Interview (Video)"

Limited Deluxe edition bonus tracks
No.	Title	Writer(s)	Producer(s)	Length
16.	"Normal"	Davis; Gholson	Drumma Boy	4:14
17.	"Vampire" (featuring Trina)	Davis; Katrina L. Taylor; Douglas	Fatboi	3:56

Sample credits

- "Gucci Time" contains a sample from Justice's "Phantom, Pt. II".

== Charts ==
=== Weekly charts ===
Chart (2010)	Peak position
US Billboard 200	4
US Top R&B/Hip-Hop Albums (Billboard)	2
US Top Rap Albums (Billboard)	2

=== Year-end charts ===
Chart (2010)	Position
US Top R&B/Hip-Hop Albums (Billboard)	56
