= Second Season =

Second Season may refer to:

- 2econd Season, a 2008 album by Unk
- Second Season, a 1977 album by Point Blank
