= BBNGLive =

Live albums by BadBadNotGood

BBNGLIVE 1

Live album by BADBADNOTGOOD
- Released: November 22, 2011
- Recorded: September 2011
- Venues: The Red Light, Toronto, ON
- Genres: Jazz; instrumental hip hip; post-bop
- Length: 61:23
- Label: Self-released

BADBADNOTGOOD chronology
BBNG (2011)	BBNGLIVE 1 (2011)	BBNGLIVE 2 (2012)

BBNGLIVE 2

Live album by BADBADNOTGOOD
- Released: February 21, 2012
- Recorded: January 21, 2012
- Venues: Club Koko, London, UK
- Genres: instrumental hip hip, post-bop
- Length: 30:17
- Label: Self-released

BADBADNOTGOOD chronology
BBNGLIVE 1 (2011)	BBNGLIVE 2 (2012)	BBNG2 (2012)

BBNGLive 1 and BBNGLive 2 (stylized in all caps) are a pair of albums released by BadBadNotGood in 2011 and 2012, respectively. The albums were released at regular intervals between the band's debut and second studio albums. Both albums were self-released as free downloads and helped build buzz for the band during their inaugural year. The band's next live record would be their Spotify Live EP, released by Innovative Leisure in 2017.

== Recording and release ==
BBNGLive 1 was recorded at one of the band's first shows, a 2011 club date in Toronto. Most of the tracks performed also appear on one of the band's earlier releases. Exceptions include the "DOOM" medley, which was released as a standalone single later in 2011, and the Joy Division cover "Division."

BBNGLive 2 differs from 1 as it recorded while the band was producing music for their album BBNG2 and acts as a teaser for that record. BBNGLive 2 was recorded at Club Koko in London where the band had been invited to play by Gilles Peterson at the Worldwide Awards.

During this period, the band also released the studio recordings "DOOM" and BBNGSingle, which was the original track "Rotten Decay" backed with the band's "Hard is Da Paint" cover.

== Reception ==
Regarding BBNGLIVE1, its release was covered by publications including Hypebeast and The Needle Drop, with the latter's Anthony Fantano commenting, "it's nice to hear these guys in a live setting."

Thomas Carroll from All About Jazz reviewed BBNGLIVE 2, giving the record 4.5 stars. In his review, he called the music "intense and... [demonstrating] a mature sensibility in regards to dynamics and a large degree of harmonic and rhythmic freedom" and commented that the band was "well on its way to building a strong positive international reputation."

== Track listing ==
Credits adapted from Bandcamp.

BBNGLIVE 1
No.	Title	Length
1.	"Hard in Da Paint" (Waka Flocka Flame cover)	3:12
2.	"Electric Relaxation" (A Tribe Called Quest cover)	5:32
3.	"Camel" (Flying Lotus cover)	4:58
4.	"DOOM" (MF Doom cover medley)	8:01
5.	"Matt Swag"	1:57
6.	"Fall in Love" (Slum Village cover)	3:51
7.	"Disorder" (Joy Division cover)	1:28
8.	"Nightmare" (Tyler, the Creator cover)	5:24
9.	"Brooklyn Zoo" (Ol' Dirty Bastard cover)	2:47
10.	"Alex Swag"	0:57
11.	"The World Is Yours" (Nas cover)	5:06
12.	"Salmonella"	3:53
13.	"Bastard / Lemonade / Assmilk / Shouts Out" (Tyler, the Creator / Gucci Mane / Odd Future cover medley)	12:52
14.	"Freedom (#RARETRACK)"	1:25
Total length:		59:37

BBNGLIVE 2
No.	Title	Length
1.	"Hard in Da Paint" (Waka Flocka Flame cover)	2:33
2.	"DMZ"	5:36
3.	"Banter"	0:35
4.	"CMYK / Limit to Your Love" (James Blake cover medley)	9:08
5.	"Rotten Decay"	5:09
13.	"Bastard / Lemonade" (Tyler, the Creator / Gucci Mane cover medley)	7:16
Total length:		31:03

== Personnel ==
Adapted from Bandcamp.

BADBADNOTGOOD

- Matthew A. Tavares – keys
- Chester Hansen – electric bass, synth bass
- Alex Sowinski – drums, sampler

Technical and art

- Matt MacNeil – engineering, mixing (BBNGLive 1)
- Matthew A. Tavares – mixing (BBNGLive 1)
- Club Koko – engineering, mixing (BBNGLive 2)
- Sam Zaret – cover photography (BBNGLive 1)
- Jade Cooling – cover photography (BBNGLive 2)
- Connor Olthuis – album art (BBNGLive 1)
