= Lil' Chopper Toy =

Studio album by Baby D
- Released: September 10, 2002
- Recorded: 2001–2002
- Genre: Dirty South, crunk
- Label: Big Oomp Records

Baby D chronology
Off Da Chain (2000)	Lil' Chopper Toy (2002)	A-Town Secret Weapon (2007)

Lil' Chopper Toy is the second album by Atlanta 18-year-old rapper Baby D. It was released in 2002 under Big Oomp Records.

== Track list ==
1. "Intro" (feat. Big Oomp)
2. "Get Crunk" (feat. Lil' C)
3. "Live In Concert" (skit)
4. "ATL Hoe!" (feat. Lil Jon, Pastor Troy & Archie)
5. "Stomp That Shit" (feat. Lil' C)
6. "Gangsta Walk" (feat. Jazze Pha, Lil' C & Slim J)
7. "We Got The Club Jumpin" (feat. Lil' Will)
8. "Big Korey" (skit)
9. "Eastside Vs Westside Remix"
10. "We Came To Get That Cheese" (feat. 8Ball & Thorough)
11. "Ridin In A Chevy, Pt. 2" (feat. Lil' C)
12. "Make Yo Shoulders Jump"
13. "Slammin Cadillac Doors"
14. "We Too Deep" (feat. Lil' C & Loko)
15. "Gregg Street Party" (skit)
16. "Let's Start A Fight" (feat. Slim J)
17. "Suckas And Bustas"
18. "Drop A Little Lower" (feat. Ying Yang Twins & 4-9 of The Hoodratz)
19. "Bouncin" (feat. Lil' C & Loko)
20. "Do You Wanna"
21. Untitled hidden track
