= Dunn Dunn =

Single by Shawty Lo

from the album Units in the City
- Released: February 22, 2008
- Recorded: 2007
- Genre: Southern hip hop
- Length: 3:17
- Label: D4L; Asylum; Warner Bros.
- Songwriters: Quandarious Antwan Jordan; Teriyakie Smith; Cory Way
- Producers: Smith; Way

Shawty Lo singles chronology
"Dey Know" (2007)	"Dunn Dunn" (2008)	"Foolish (Remix)" (2008)

Dunn Dunn 12"
- CD Single

"Dunn Dunn" is a song by American rapper Shawty Lo of southern hip hop group D4L, released on February 22, 2008, as the second single from his debut solo album, Units in the City (2008). The single, which was produced by Teriyakie Smith and Cory Way, was preceded by "Dey Know" and followed by "Foolish".

== Controversy ==
Shawty Lo wrote and recorded "Dunn Dunn" as a diss track directly aimed at fellow Atlanta-based rapper T.I. On T.I.'s song, "No Matter What" from Paper Trail (2008), he raps "So you up-and-coming rappers wanna diss, just kill it. I'm officially the realest, point blank, period.", which was perceived to be directed at Shawty Lo. Paper Trail also features a song titled "What Up, What's Haapnin" that directly disses Shawty Lo with lines such as "Still I hear you loud and clear on ya lil' song, go on get ya dissin' on while the king gone" and "'Cause I yell Bankhead and you felt left out, I ain't mention your name that's what all this 'bout?"

On May 16, 2008, Shawty Lo released a video asking anyone who knows T.I. to send him T.I.'s high school yearbook picture, saying that he wanted to prove that T.I. is not really from Bankhead. He offered cash to anyone who would. T.I. continued to insult Shawty Lo, saying Shawty Lo only shows disrespect towards T.I. because he is successful.

== Other versions ==
- Florida-based rapper Ace Hood has a freestyle rap over the production titled "We Here (Dunn, Dunn)" taken from his mixtape, Ace Won't Fold (2008).

== Chart positions ==
Chart (2008)	Peak position
US Hot R&B/Hip-Hop Songs (Billboard)	62
