= Bingo (Gucci Mane song) =

Single by Gucci Mane featuring Soulja Boy Tell 'Em and Waka Flocka Flame

from the album The State vs. Radric Davis
- Released: January 12, 2010
- Recorded: 2009
- Genre: Hip hop
- Length: 3:55
- Label: 1017 Brick Squad; Warner Bros.; Asylum
- Songwriters: Radric Davis; DeAndre Way; Juaquin Malphurs; Scott Storch
- Producer: Scott Storch

Gucci Mane singles chronology
"Lemonade" (2009)	"Bingo" (2010)	"Steady Mobbin" (2010)

Soulja Boy Tell 'Em singles chronology
"Pronto" (2009)	"Bingo" (2010)	"All the Way Turnt Up" (2010)

Waka Flocka Flame singles chronology
"Hard in da Paint" (2009)	"Bingo" (2010)	"No Hands" (2010)

"Bingo" is a song recorded by American rapper Gucci Mane for his second studio album, The State vs. Radric Davis. The song features Soulja Boy Tell 'Em and Waka Flocka Flame, and it was released as the album's fourth single on January 12, 2010, and peaked at number 75 on the US R&B/Hip-Hop chart.

== Background ==
"Worst Enemy" and "Heavy" were originally supposed to be the third and fourth single, however both their releases were cancelled, and they only received promotional releases in November 2009. "Lemonade" and "Bingo" took their places and were released in December 2009 and January 2010.

== Music video ==
The video premiered on BET on March 4, 2010. It depicts the rappers performing the song in a parking lot at night. American model Chandra Davis makes a cameo appearance.

== Release and chart performance ==
"Bingo" was sent to US radio stations in January 2010. Following its release, the song debuted on the US Billboard Hot R&B/Hip-Hop Songs charts at number 98. The song peaked at number 75 on that chart.

== Charts ==
Chart (2009)	Peak Position
US Hot R&B/Hip-Hop Songs (Billboard)	75
