= Lolli Lolli (Pop That Body) =

Single by Three 6 Mafia featuring Project Pat, Yung D and SuperPower

from the album Last 2 Walk
- Released: March 11, 2008
- Recorded: 2007
- Genre: Pop rap; dance-pop; electropop
- Length: 4:11
- Label: Columbia, Sony BMG, Hypnotize Minds
- Songwriters: Darin Baker, Paul Beauregard, Darrell Chambers, Jordan Houston, Patrick Houston
- Producers: DJ Paul, Juicy J

Three 6 Mafia singles chronology
"Side 2 Side" (2006)	"Lolli Lolli (Pop That Body)" (2008)	"That's Right" (2008)

Music video
- "Lolli Lolli (Pop That Body) (Official HD Video)" on YouTube

"Lolli Lolli (Pop That Body)" is a song by Three 6 Mafia, released as the first single from their ninth studio album Last 2 Walk. It features Project Pat, Yung D and SuperPower. The song mixes Three 6 Mafia's hip hop style with electropop and dance-pop music. The song was criticized by fans due to its electropop/dance-pop elements, which made the song different from Three 6 Mafia's early music.

== Background ==
The song was Yung D's first appearance when he was signed to Hypnotize Minds and it has reached number 18 on the Billboard Hot 100. Originally the first single was to be "Doe Boy Fresh", featuring Chamillionaire, but it was cut from the album due to the album delays. Initially an early leaked version of the song sampled the Halloween movie theme song, but was replaced with a piano loop that sounds different due to issues clearing that sample. Many Internet users mistook SuperPower singing on the hook using the auto-tune effect to be Florida-based R&B singer T-Pain, known for his use of the auto-tune effect and numerous cameos on other people's albums, hence many early songs circulating on the Internet claiming to feature T-Pain.

To date, the single has been certified platinum by the RIAA.

== Title name ==
Oddly enough, "Lolli Lolli (Pop That Body)" was released just two days before Lil Wayne's smash hit "Lollipop". While the two songs claim similar titles and subject matter, Three 6 Mafia's Juicy J, in an interview with BeatsPerMillennium, claims that this was pure coincidence and that Lil Wayne completed his song first. Also, the group's song was originally called "Lollipop", but out of respect for Lil Wayne, the name was changed to "Lolli Lolli (Pop That Body)".

== Remix ==
The official remix features a verse from Pitbull and SuperPower on the chorus. The remix has 2 different versions and have been released on Three 6 Mafia's website. The first remix used the instrumental of the original. The second remix, the "Planet Rock Remix", samples Afrika Bambaataa & the Soulsonic Force's "Planet Rock".

== Charts ==
=== Weekly charts ===
Chart (2008)	Peak position
Canada Hot 100 (Billboard)	62
New Zealand (Recorded Music NZ)	5
US Billboard Hot 100	18
US Hot R&B/Hip-Hop Songs (Billboard)	48
US Hot Rap Songs (Billboard)	7
US Pop Airplay (Billboard)	20
US Rhythmic Airplay (Billboard)	4

=== Year-end charts ===
Chart (2008)	Position
New Zealand (Recorded Music NZ)	33
US Billboard Hot 100	70
US Rhythmic (Billboard)	22

== Certifications ==
Region	Certification	Certified units/sales
New Zealand (RMNZ)	Gold	7,500^{*}
United States (RIAA)	Platinum	1,000,000^{^}
United States (RIAA) Mastertone	Gold	500,000^{*}
^{*} Sales figures based on certification alone.^{^} Shipments figures based on certification alone.
