= Gucci Time =

Single by Gucci Mane featuring Swizz Beatz

from the album The Appeal: Georgia's Most Wanted
- Released: August 30, 2010
- Recorded: 2010
- Genre: Southern hip-hop
- Length: 2:56
- Label: 1017 Brick Squad; Warner Bros.; Asylum
- Songwriters: Radric Davis; Kasseem Dean; Gaspard Augé; Xavier de Rosnay; Massimo Morante; Fabio Pignatelli; Claudio Simonetti
- Producer: Swizz Beatz

Gucci Mane singles chronology
"Countin' Money" (2010)	"Gucci Time" (2010)	"She Be Puttin' On" (2011)

Swizz Beatz singles chronology
"Fancy" (2010)	"Gucci Time" (2010)	"Start It Up" (2010)

Music video
- "Gucci Time" on YouTube

"Gucci Time" is a song by American rapper Gucci Mane featuring vocals and production from Swizz Beatz. The song premiered on Gucci Mane's official Myspace page on August 6, 2010 and was released on August 30 as the lead and only single from Gucci Mane's seventh studio album The Appeal: Georgia's Most Wanted. The song samples French electronic music duo Justice's song "Phantom Pt. II".

== Music video ==
The music video was released on September 4, 2010 on Myspace. The Chris Robinson-directed clip shows Gucci Mane and Swizz Beatz perform throughout various location of Los Angeles, varying from city streets to a location above to city's skyline, to a strip club.

== Charts ==
Chart (2010)	Peak position
US Bubbling Under Hot 100 (Billboard)	4
US Hot R&B/Hip-Hop Songs (Billboard)	23
US Hot Rap Songs (Billboard)	12
