= BBNG (album) =

Studio album by BadBadNotGood
- Released: 17 September 2011
- Genre: Jazz; instrumental hip hop; post-bop; electronic
- Length: 46:27
- Label: Self-released

BadBadNotGood chronology
BBNG (2011)	BBNGLive 1 (2011)

Singles from BBNG
- 1. "Fall in Love" Released: August 9, 2011

BBNG is the debut album from Canadian jazz instrumental hip hop band BadBadNotGood. It was released as a free download in 2011. The album features a mixture of original compositions and covers of songs from the artists Flying Lotus, Gang Starr, J Dilla, Joy Division, Nas and Ol' Dirty Bastard. The cover artwork was designed and made by Connor Olthuis and Sam Zaret.

== Release and reception ==
After putting out a series of covers, as well as the original track "Salmonella," in mid-2011, the band released their debut album BBNG for free on their Bandcamp page in September 2011. The album circulated around the blogosphere and was championed by tastemakers DJ Gilles Peterson and critic Anthony Fantano of The Needle Drop. Peterson would go on to invite them to play at his Worldwide Awards in London in January 2012. In a positive review of the album, Fantano complemented their fusion of hip hop, electronic, and jazz traditions and said that the group "show a lot of great musicianship... and they just play off each other so well." However, he wished that the record was a bit more focused and contained more original material.

The album was quickly followed by two live albums, BBNGLIVE 1 and BBNGLIVE 2, released in November 2011 and February 2012, respectively.

== Track listing ==
Credits adapted from Bandcamp.

No.	Title	Length
1.	"Based Is How You Feel Inside"	1:22
2.	"Fall in Love" (Slum Village cover)	4:11
3.	"Improvised Jam"	3:45
4.	"Mass Appeal / Transmission" (Gang Starr / Joy Division cover)	4:51
5.	"I Got a Bad Feeling About This"	0:07
6.	"Salmonella"	1:47
7.	"Freedom / Billium Evans" (prod. Seeds of Yaris)	5:17
8.	"The World Is Yours / Brooklyn Zoo" (Nas / Ol' Dirty Bastard cover)	6:22
9.	"Listeriosis"	4:14
10.	"Camel" (Flying Lotus cover)	3:04
11.	"Title Theme / Saria's Song / Song of Storms" (medley from The Legend of Zelda: Ocarina of Time)	9:34
12.	"Outro / Glasper"	1:53
Total length:		46:27

== Personnel ==
Credits sourced from Bandcamp.

BADBADNOTGOOD

- Matthew Tavares – keyboards, synthesizer, mixing
- Chester Hansen – bass guitar, upright bass, sampler
- Alexander Sowinski – drums, sampler

Technical

- Matt MacNeil – engineer, mixing

== Precedent EPs ==
In June 2011, the group released an early version of their album online. Titled BADBADNOTGOOD, and sometimes referred to as BBNG, only one track later appeared on their debut album, the original "Salmonella;" a version of the EP's fifth track appeared on their sophomore album as "Bastard/Lemonade" and "Hard in The Paint" was included as a b-side. The EP was later removed from the internet. Prior to the EP, they released their Odd Future Sessions online for digital download under the name The Odd Trio.

BADBADNOTGOOD (June 2011)
No.	Title	Length
1.	"Electric Relaxation" (A Tribe Called Quest cover)	4:26
2.	"Untitled 63 - Nightmare - Yonkers" (Tyler, the Creator medley)	11:53
3.	"Salmonella"	1:47
4.	"Hard in the Paint" (Waka Flocka Flame cover)	3:29
5.	"Bastard - Lemonade / Orange Juice - Assmilk" (Tyler, the Creator / Gucci Mane / Odd Future medley)	8:00
6.	"Untitled 63 - Nightmare - Yonkers (Alt. take)"	11:13
Total length:		40:48

The Odd Future Sessions Pt. 2 as The Odd Trio – (June 2011)
No.	Title	Length
1.	"Goblin Medley (Untitled 63, Nightmare, Yonkers)" (Tyler, the Creator medley)	11:53
Total length:		11:53

The Odd Future Sessions as The Odd Trio – (May 2011)
No.	Title	Length
1.	"The Medley (Bastard, Lemonade, Assmilk)" (Tyler, the Creator, Gucci Mane, and Odd Future medley)	8:00
2.	"Session (Rare Outtake)" (Tyler, The Creator, Hodgy Beats, and Mike G cover)	3:55
3.	"?????? (Rare Based ?????)"	0:14
Total length:		12:09
