= Burrrprint 2 =

Burrrprint (2) HD

Mixtape by Gucci Mane
- Released: April 13, 2010
- Recorded: 2009–2010
- Label: 1017 Brick Squad, Warner Bros. Records
- Producer: Drumma Boy, FATBOI, Shawty Redd, Schife, OhZee

Gucci Mane chronology
The State vs. Radric Davis (2009)	Burrrprint (2) HD (2010)	The Appeal: Georgia's Most Wanted (2010)

Professional ratings
Review scores
Source	Rating
AllMusic	3.5/5 stars
HipHopDX	2/5 stars
Pitchfork Media	(6.4/10)
Sputnikmusic	2.5/5 stars

Burrrprint 2 (also stylized as Burrrprint (2) HD) is a mixtape by rapper Gucci Mane. It was released four months after the release of his fourth studio album The State vs. Radric Davis on April 13, 2010. It is the sequel to The Burrprint mixtape released in 2009.

Drumma Boy produced all but five songs on the mixtape. These songs were previously recorded before Gucci Mane was sent to jail. However, the introduction to the album was recorded over the phone by Gucci Mane from jail. The album features guest appearances from Shawty Lo, DJ Khaled, Yo Gotti, Nicki Minaj, Rick Ross, Waka Flocka Flame, OJ Da Juiceman, Lil' Kim, Jim Jones, Trey Songz, Ludacris, Rocko, Alley Boy, Wooh Da Kid, and Mylah. Music videos have also been filmed for the songs "911 Emergency", "Boy From the Block", "Everybody Looking" (which has over 10 million views on YouTube), and "Antisocial" featuring Mylah.

The mixtape debuted at number 19 on the Billboard 200 with first-week sales of 19,000 copies. A song from the mixtape, "Beat It Up" featuring Trey Songz, charted on the Billboard Hot R&B/Hip-Hop Songs and Rap Songs charts at numbers 36 and 22, respectively, and appears on the deluxe edition of Gucci Mane's third studio album, The Appeal: Georgia's Most Wanted. "Atlanta Zoo" featuring Ludacris & "911 Emergency" debuted at #15 and #21 on the Bubbling Under R&B/Hip-Hop Singles chart, respectively.

== Track listing ==
No.	Title	Producer(s)	Length
1.	"Gucci Speaks"		1:15
2.	"Intro Live from Fulton County Jail HD"	Drumma Boy	2:35
3.	"Atlanta Zoo" (featuring Ludacris)	Fatboi	3:39
4.	"Boy from the Block"	Drumma Boy	4:17
5.	"Gucci Speaks / Shawty Lo Speaks"		0:31
6.	"Parked Outside"	Shawty Redd	3:54
7.	"Gucci on the Rise"	Drumma Boy	2:30
8.	"Rick Ross Speaks / DJ Khaled Speaks"		0:34
9.	"Do this Shit Again" (featuring Yo Gotti, Schife & Rick Ross)	Schife, OhZee	3:53
10.	"Everybody Looking"	Drumma Boy	3:42
11.	"Yo Gotti Speaks"		0:30
12.	"Coca Coca" (featuring Rocko, OJ da Juiceman, Waka Flocka Flame, Shawty Lo, Yo Gotti & Nicki Minaj)	Drumma Boy	8:48
13.	"Gucci Speaks"		1:16
14.	"Here We Go Again"	Drumma Boy	4:38
15.	"Lil' Kim Speaks"		0:26
16.	"Antisocial" (featuring Mylah)	Drumma Boy	4:42
17.	"Beat It Up" (featuring Trey Songz)	Drumma Boy	4:29
18.	"Gucci Speaks"		0:37
19.	"911 Emergency"	Drumma Boy	4:20
20.	"Alley Boy Speaks"		0:11
21.	"How I'm Living" (featuring Jim Jones)	Fatboi	3:25
22.	"Shining for No Apparent Reason" (featuring Waka Flocka Flame, Schife & Wooh da Kid)	Schife, OhZee	3:45
23.	"I'm So Tired of You"	Drumma Boy	3:29
24.	"Outro Live from Fulton County Jail HD"	Drumma Boy	2:36

== Charts ==
=== Weekly charts ===
Chart (2010)	Peak position
US Billboard 200	19
US Top R&B/Hip-Hop Albums (Billboard)	6
US Top Rap Albums (Billboard)	2

=== Year-end charts ===
Chart (2010)	Position
US Top R&B/Hip-Hop Albums (Billboard)	67
