= Beat'n Down Yo Block! =

Studio album by Unk
- Released: October 3, 2006
- Recorded: 2005–06
- Genre: Southern hip hop
- Length: 1:07:07
- Labels: Big Oomp; Koch
- Producers: Big Korey; DJ Montay; Freddy B; Joe Durty; MC Assault

Unk chronology
| Beat'n Down Yo Block! (2006) | 2econd Season (2008) |

Singles from Beat'n Down Yo Block!
- 1. "Walk It Out" Released: August 18, 2006; 2. "2 Step" Released: March 13, 2007

Beat'n Down Yo Block! is the debut studio album by Atlanta-based American rapper Unk. It was released on October 3, 2006 through Big Oomp Records and Koch Records. Production was handled by DJ Montay, MC Assault, Freddie B, Big Korey and Joe Durty. It features guest appearances from DJ Montay, Dru, Baby D, Backbone, Big Korey, D.G. Yola, DJ Jelly, Jazze Pha, Jizzleman, Loko and Parlae. The album peaked at number 109 on the Billboard 200, number 21 on the Top R&B/Hip-Hop Albums, number 8 on the Top Rap Albums, and topped the Heatseekers Albums charts in the United States.

Koch Entertainment re-released an expanded edition of the album on September 25, 2007, featuring previously unreleased tracks and a bonus DVD.

== Critical reception ==
Professional ratings
Review scores
| Source | Rating |
|---|---|
| AllMusic | 3.5/5 stars |
| RapReviews | 4.5/10 |

AllMusic's David Jeffries said that despite the over-bloated track list containing "redundant filler", he praised Unk's delivery and catchy rhymes and Big Oomp overseeing the record, concluding that: "Seeing how Beat'n Down Yo Block is such a loud, hedonistic, and thuggish good time, that's a fair tradeoff". Steve Juon of RapReviews criticized the track list for following a formula that uses the "same tempo, same bassline, same monotonous rap about the same topics" and felt that Unk did little to distinguish himself alongside fellow Southern rappers Young Jeezy and Yung Joc.

== Track listing ==
Beat'n Down Yo Block! (KOC-CD-5973)
| No. | Title | Writer(s) | Producer(s) | Length |
|---|---|---|---|---|
| 1. | "Intro" (featuring DJ Jelly) | Anthony Platt; Fard Shahid | DJ Montay | 1:53 |
| 2. | "Beat'n Down Yo Block" | Platt; Montay Humphrey | DJ Montay | 3:42 |
| 3. | "Walk It Out" | Platt; Humphrey; Howard Simmons | DJ Montay | 2:53 |
| 4. | "Coming Down Da Street" (featuring Loko) | Platt; Lorenzo Scott; Humphrey | DJ Montay | 2:47 |
| 5. | "Bring It Back" | Platt; Humphrey | DJ Montay | 3:29 |
| 6. | "2 Step" | Platt; Humphrey; Shahid | DJ Montay | 3:15 |
| 7. | "Slow It Up" (featuring Jizzleman) | Platt; Bernard Leverette; Humphrey | DJ Montay | 2:55 |
| 8. | "Don't Make Us" (featuring DJ Montay and D.G. Yola) | Platt; Humphrey; Mario Talley; Simmons | DJ Montay | 5:21 |
| 9. | "Flatline" | Platt; Humphrey | DJ Montay; MC Assault | 2:56 |
| 10. | "Thinking of You" (featuring Jazze Pha) | Platt; Phalon Alexander; Corey Hooker; Shahid | DJ Montay; Freddy B | 3:27 |
| 11. | "Fresh Dressed" (featuring Backbone) | Platt; Jamahr Williams; Humphrey | DJ Montay; Big Korey | 4:51 |
| 12. | "Ayyy" | Platt | DJ Montay | 3:21 |
| 13. | "This Is How We Do" (featuring Big Korey and Dru) | Platt; Korey Roberson; Andrew Matey | Freddy B | 2:51 |
| 14. | "Hold on Ho" (featuring Baby D, DJ Montay and Parlae) | Platt; Donald B. Jenkins; Maurice Gleaton; Simmons | DJ Montay; MC Assault | 3:23 |
| 15. | "Smokin' Sticky Sticky" | Platt; Humphrey | DJ Montay | 6:20 |
| 16. | "Hit the Dance Floor" | Platt | DJ Montay | 3:38 |
| 17. | "Say Yes" (featuring Dru) | Platt; Matey; Scott; Shahid | Freddy B | 2:33 |
| 18. | "Back It Up" | Platt; Simmons | DJ Montay; MC Assault | 2:26 |
| 19. | "Brand New Day" | Platt; Scott | DJ Montay; MC Assault; Joe Durty | 5:06 |
| Total length: | | | | 1:07:07 |

Best Buy Bonus CD (KOC-CD-5975)
| No. | Title | Producer(s) | Length |
|---|---|---|---|
| 20. | "My Nine Right Beside Me" (featuring Loko) | DJ Montay; Caspa |
| 21. | "Divide That" | DJ Montay; MC Assault |
| 22. | "Let It Ride" | DJ Montay; Freddy B; MC Assault |
| 23. | "Wass Crackin" (featuring Baby D) |
| 24. | "Like Me" (featuring Loko) |
| 25. | "Chevy Rider" (performed by Hitman Sammy Sam and Loko) |

Japanese deluxe edition (distributed via Victor Entertainment, Inc. VICP-63916)
| No. | Title | Length |
|---|---|---|
| 20. | "Walk It Out (Instrumental)" |
| 21. | "2 Step (Instrumental)" |

Deluxe edition Walmart exclusive bonus tracks (KOC-CD-5556)
| No. | Title | Length |
|---|---|---|
| 20. | "Walk It Out (Remix)" (featuring Outkast and Jim Jones) |
| 21. | "Walk It Out (Instrumental)" |
| 22. | "2 Step (Instrumental)" |

DVD Deluxe Edition (KOC-CD-5002)
| No. | Title | Length |
|---|---|---|
| 20. | "Walk It Out (Remix)" (featuring Outkast and Jim Jones) |
| 21. | "2 Step (Remix)" (featuring T-Pain, Jim Jones and E-40) |
| 22. | "Walk It Out (Video)" |
| 23. | "2 Step (Video)" |
| 24. | "2 Step (Director's Cut)" |
| 25. | "2 Step (Dance Version)" |
| 26. | "Hit The Dance Floor (Director's Cut)" |
| 27. | "The Making Of "2 Step"" |
| 28. | "The Making OF "Hit The Dance Floor"" |

Sample credits

- Track 10 contains replayed elements form the composition "Groove With You" by The Isley Brothers.

Notes

- Track 16 was replaced with its remix featuring Baby D on DVD deluxe version of the album.

== Charts ==
| Chart (2006) | Peak position |
|---|---|
| US Billboard 200 | 109 |
| US Top R&B/Hip-Hop Albums (Billboard) | 21 |
| US Heatseekers Albums (Billboard) | 1 |
