= Off da Chain =

Off Da Chain

Studio album by Baby D
- Released: 25 July 2000
- Label: Big Oomp
- Producer: Southern Style DJ's

Baby D chronology
Off Da Chain (2000)	Lil' Chopper Toy (2002)

Professional ratings
Review scores
Source	Rating
AllMusic	4/5 stars

Off Da Chain is the debut album by the Atlanta-based rapper Baby D, released in 2000 via Big Oomp Records. It contains collaborations with Lil Jon and YoungBloodz, among others. "Eastside Vs Westside" was a minor club hit.

== Track list ==
1. "Intro"
2. "Bow His Azz Up" (feat. Lil Jon & Dollar)
3. "Don't Fall" (feat. Loko, Lil' C & Hitman Sammy Sam)
4. "Queblo Gold Calls Da Oomp Camp" (skit)
5. "Back Up" (feat. Lil' Pete & Gold)
6. "My Folk"
7. "Like This" (feat. Dollar)
8. "Jumpin Down On Em" (feat. YoungBloodZ, Loko & Dollar)
9. "Eastside Vs Westside" (feat. Lil' C)
10. "Head To Da Club"
11. "Ridin In A Chevy" (feat. Lil' C & Swade)
12. "Ooh Ooh" (feat. Freddy B & Lil' C)
13. "Voicemail" (skit)
14. "We Ballin" (feat. Dollar)
15. "Why Why" (feat. Crom)
16. "Bounce Dat Azz" (feat. Lil' C & Beezelee)
