= The State vs. Radric Davis =

Studio album by Gucci Mane
- Released: December 8, 2009
- Recorded: July 2008 – October 2009
- Genres: Hip-hop; dirty south
- Length: 73:38 (standard edition); 104:29 (iTunes deluxe edition)
- Labels: 1017 Brick Squad; Asylum; Warner Bros.
- Producers: Radric "Gucci Mane" Davis (also exec.); Fatboi; Polow da Don; Drumma Boy; Bangladesh; Shawty Redd; Scott Storch; Zaytoven; Jazze Pha; J.U.S.T.I.C.E. League; Mannie Fresh

Gucci Mane chronology
| The Cold War (2009) | The State vs. Radric Davis (2009) | Burrrprint 2 (2010) |

Singles from The State vs. Radric Davis
- 1. "Wasted" Released: July 7, 2009; 2. "Spotlight" Released: October 19, 2009; 3. "Lemonade" Released: December 7, 2009; 4. "Bingo" Released: January 12, 2010

The State vs. Radric Davis is the sixth studio album by American rapper Gucci Mane. It was released on December 8, 2009, by Asylum Records. The State vs. Radric Davis came after a slew of independent releases, mixtapes, and features over the prior few years. Productions from Polow da Don, Drumma Boy, Fatboi, Mannie Fresh, among others. Featured artists include Usher, Plies, Lil Wayne, Cam'ron, Soulja Boy, Rick Ross, Bun B, OJ da Juiceman, Wooh da Kid, Waka Flocka Flame, and Nicki Minaj. The iTunes deluxe version contains the EP, Wasted: The Prequel.

The album was met with generally favorable reviews from music critics. It debuted at number 10 on the US Billboard 200, selling 90,000 copies in its first week, and was certified gold by the RIAA for sales exceeding 500,000 copies.

== Background ==
Based on the success of The State vs. Radric Davis, Gucci Mane announced that his next two albums would be part of a trilogy, with the two of them titled The Appeal: Georgia's Most Wanted and The State vs. Radric Davis: The Verdict due to be released on September 28, 2010. However, he later decided to break the trilogy and change the third album's title.

== Singles ==
"Wasted", featuring Plies, was released as the album's lead single on July 7, 2009. The song peaked at number 36 on the US Billboard Hot 100, and number 3 on the Hot R&B/Hip-Hop Songs chart, making it as his first top five on the chart.

"Spotlight", featuring Usher, was released as the album's second single on October 19, 2009. The song peaked at number 42 on the US Billboard Hot 100, and number 15 on the Hot R&B/Hip-Hop Songs chart.

"Lemonade" was released as the album's third single on December 7, 2009. The song peaked at number 53 on the US Billboard Hot 100, number 15 on the Hot R&B/Hip-Hop songs chart, and number 8 on the Top Rap Songs chart. The song's subject matter involves the proceeds from the illegal sale of codeine-infused lemonade, all of which the artist describes as yellow or lemon-colored.

"Bingo", featuring Soulja Boy and Waka Flocka Flame, was released as the album's fourth single on January 12, 2010. The song peaked at number 75 on the US Hot R&B/Hip-Hop chart.

=== Promotional singles ===
"Worst Enemy" was released as the album's first promotional single on November 12, 2009. The song revisits Gucci Mane's past about how it led to his fame and how he's moving on in life despite his struggles. Young Jeezy and T.I. are referenced on this song. The music video for the song was released on December 8, 2009.

"Heavy" was released as the album's second promotional single on November 25, 2009.

=== Other songs ===
The videos for the deluxe edition tracks "Bricks" (featuring Yung Ralph and Yo Gotti), "Photoshoot", and "She Got a Friend" (featuring Juelz Santana and Big Boi) were released on iTunes on October 20, 2011. A music video was also filmed for "All About the Money", featuring Rick Ross. "Bricks" and "Photoshoot" managed to peak at number 19 and 18 on the US Billboard Bubbling Under R&B/Hip-Hop Singles chart, respectively. "I'm a Dog" (featuring DG Yola) and "Sex in Crazy Places" (featuring Bobby V, Nicki Minaj, and Trina) debuted on the same chart at number 8 and number 22, respectively, due to digital sales.

== Critical reception ==
Professional ratings
Aggregate scores
| Source | Rating |
|---|---|
| Metacritic | 66/100 |
Review scores
| Source | Rating |
| AllMusic | 4/5 stars |
| The A.V. Club | C+ |
| The Guardian | 2/5 stars |
| NME | 2/10 |
| NOW | 5/5 Ns |
| Pitchfork | 8.0/10 |
| RapReviews | 6.5/10 |
| Rolling Stone | 3.5/5 stars |
| Spin | 3.5/5 stars |
| XXL | 4/5 stars |

The State vs. Radric Davis polarized music critics. At Metacritic, which assigns a normalized rating out of 100 to reviews from mainstream critics, the album received an average score of 66, based on 11 reviews.

Joshua Errett of NOW gave the album high praise for its "loveable simplicity" on the typical hip-hop clichés and said that its cast of guest artists and producers combined with Gucci's performance would turn the record into "rap's album of the year." Gregory Heaney of AllMusic praised the producers and guest artists for creating an album that's a culmination of the Dirty South sound and Gucci for straddling the line between excessive and contemplative, saying that, "At the end of the day, The State vs. Radric Davis delivers the full spectrum of Gucci Mane, showing both the cash and yellow diamond-loving side, as well as his more reflective (or at least more self-aware) side." Rob Markman of XXL also credited the album for having the producers supply it with great sounds and for giving Gucci some guests artists he can trade lines with, concluding that "musically, The State vs. Radric Davis has proven the rapper's case beyond a reasonable doubt. So when rap fans ask if he is now a bankable hip-hop star, let the record show that Gucci mane is guilty as charged." Spin writer Sean Fennessey was fascinated by Gucci's "low-toned voice, relentless repetition, and brilliantly goofy way with vocabulary" in his lyrical delivery and how subversive he can be on tracks like "Heavy" and "Worst Enemy", concluding that, "Gucci is not always so reflective; sometimes he's as broad and bracing as a ball-peen hammer [...] But more often than not, the prolific MC limits his id, and emphasizes a surprisingly gripping superego."

Louis Cloutier of RapReviews commended the contributions from Fatboi and Drumma Boy throughout the record but was critical of Gucci's limited skills as a rapper, pointing out he excels in the "light-hearted goofiness" of the former but gets overshadowed by the guest artists who ride the latter's "dark and serious tone" better than he does, with the exception of "Worst Enemy", concluding that "In short, there's nothing seriously wrong with Gucci Mane, but there's nothing seriously right either." Michaelangelo Matos of The A.V. Club credited Gucci for compensating his rap delivery over "tinny keyboards and booming drum machines" with "sharp wordplay" but found that formula for the album lacking and suggested listening to his free mixtapes. Paul MacInnes of The Guardian found the album disappointing, calling the Dirty South sound "by the numbers", the producers' contributions unengaging and Gucci's mumbling delivery hard to listen to. Rob Boffard of NME criticized Gucci's flow and lyricism for being monotonous and irritating and the producers and guest artists for not offering anything worthy to the album, concluding that "'…Radric Davis' is deeply flawed, and ultimately Gucci has committed the worst crime in rap: he’s boring."

== Track listing ==
| No. | Title | Writer(s) | Producer(s) | Length |
|---|---|---|---|---|
| 1. | "Classical (Intro)" | Radric Davis; Christopher Gholson | Drumma Boy | 3:33 |
| 2. | "Interlude #1: Toilet Bowl Shawty" (featuring Mike Epps) | Michael Epps | | 1:13 |
| 3. | "Heavy" | Davis; Demetrius Stewart | Shawty Redd | 4:31 |
| 4. | "Stupid Wild" (featuring Lil Wayne and Cam'ron) | Davis; Dwayne Carter, Jr.; Cameron Giles; Shondrae "Bangladesh" Crawford | Bangladesh | 4:30 |
| 5. | "All About the Money" (featuring Rick Ross) | Davis; William Roberts II; Gholson | Drumma Boy | 3:41 |
| 6. | "Lemonade" | Davis; Crawford; Howard Kaylan; Mark Volman | Bangladesh | 4:05 |
| 7. | "Bingo" (featuring Soulja Boy and Waka Flocka Flame) | Davis; DeAndre Way; Juaquin Malphurs; Scott Storch | Scott Storch | 3:55 |
| 8. | "Spotlight" (featuring Usher) | Davis; Usher Raymond IV; Jamal Jones | Polow da Don | 3:53 |
| 9. | "I Think I'm in Love" (featuring Jason Caesar) | Davis; Jason Caesar; Xavier Dotson | Zaytoven | 4:18 |
| 10. | "Bad Bad Bad" (featuring Keyshia Cole) | Davis; Keyshia Cole; LaDamon Douglas; Sean Garrett | Fatboi | 3:38 |
| 11. | "Interlude #2: Toilet Bowl Shawty" (featuring Mike Epps) | Epps | | 1:06 |
| 12. | "Sex in Crazy Places" (featuring Bobby V, Nicki Minaj, and Trina) | Davis; Bobby Wilson; Onika Maraj; Katrina Taylor; Douglas | Fatboi | 4:18 |
| 13. | "The Movie" | Davis; Phalon Alexander; Larry "Detroit" Nix | Jazze Pha; Detroit (co.) | 4:00 |
| 14. | "Volume" (featuring Wooh da Kid) | Davis; Nyquan "Wooh da Kid" Malphurs; Erik Ortiz; Kevin Crowe | J.U.S.T.I.C.E. League | 4:07 |
| 15. | "Gingerbread Man" (featuring OJ da Juiceman) | Davis; Otis Williams, Jr.; Byron Thomas | Mannie Fresh | 3:37 |
| 16. | "Wasted" (featuring Plies) | Davis; Algernod Washington; Douglas | Fatboi | 4:09 |
| 17. | "Kush Is My Cologne" (featuring Bun B, Devin The Dude, and E-40) | Davis; Bernard Freeman; Devin Copeland; Earl Stevens; Gholson | Drumma Boy | 5:17 |
| 18. | "Worst Enemy" | Davis; Gholson | Drumma Boy | 4:04 |
| 19. | "Interlude #3: Toilet Bowl Shawty" (featuring Mike Epps) | Epps | | 1:05 |
| 20. | "Wasted (Remix)" (featuring Lil Wayne, Jadakiss, and Birdman) | Davis; Carter, Jr.; Jason Phillips; Bryan Williams; Douglas | Fatboi | 4:38 |

iTunes Store deluxe edition bonus tracks
| No. | Title | Writer(s) | Producer(s) | Length |
|---|---|---|---|---|
| 21. | "Wasted (Remix)" (featuring OJ da Juiceman) | Davis; Williams; Douglas | Fatboi | 4:13 |
| 22. | "Shirt Off" (featuring Wooh da Kid and Frenchie) | Davis; N. Malphurs; Greg "Frenchie" Hogan; Dotson | Zaytoven | 4:26 |
| 23. | "Photoshoot" | Davis; Gholson | Drumma Boy | 3:57 |
| 24. | "She Got a Friend" (featuring Juelz Santana and Big Boi) | Davis; LaRon James; Antwan Patton; Douglas | Fatboi | 4:01 |
| 25. | "I'm a Dog" (featuring DG Yola) | Davis; Mario "DG Yola" Talley; Dotson | Zaytoven | 4:34 |
| 26. | "Bricks" (featuring Yung Ralph and Yo Gotti) | Davis; Ralph "Yung Ralph" Thomas; Mario Mims; Dotson | Zaytoven | 4:45 |
| 27. | "Yelp" | Davis; Gholson | Drumma Boy | 4:55 |

Sample credits

- "Lemonade" contains a sample of "Keep It Warm" performed by Flo & Eddie
- "Kush Is My Cologne" contains a sample of "I Got Em" performed by Drumma Boy, Gucci Mane and J Money

Interpolate credits

- "Kush Is My Cologne" contains an interpolation of "Rehab" performed by Amy Winehouse

== Charts ==
=== Weekly charts ===
| Chart (2009–2010) | Peak position |
|---|---|
| US Billboard 200 | 10 |
| US Top R&B/Hip-Hop Albums (Billboard) | 4 |
| US Top Rap Albums (Billboard) | 1 |

=== Year-end charts ===
| Chart (2010) | Position |
|---|---|
| US Billboard 200 | 78 |
| US R&B/Hip-Hop Albums (Billboard) | 23 |
| US Rap Albums (Billboard) | 12 |

== Certifications ==
| Region | Certification | Certified units/sales |
|---|---|---|
| United States (RIAA) | Platinum | 1,000,000^{‡} |
^{‡} Sales+streaming figures based on certification alone.

== See also ==
- List of number-one rap albums of 2009 (U.S.)
- List of number-one rap albums of 2010 (U.S.)
