= Units in the City =

Studio album by Shawty Lo
- Released: February 26, 2008
- Recorded: 2007–2008
- Venue: 2610 Bankhead Hwy
- Studio: D4L
- Genre: Southern hip-hop
- Length: 51:00
- Label: D4L; Dee Money; Hitt Hitt; Asylum
- Producer: Born Immaculate; Balis Beats; DJ Montay; Jeremy Prather; J. Jeffries; Mike The Track Blazer; Pharren Lowther

Shawty Lo chronology
Down for Life (2005)	Units in the City (2008)	R.I.C.O. (2017)

Singles from Units in the City
- 1. "Dey Know" Released: December 4, 2007; 2. "Dunn Dunn" Released: February 12, 2008; 3. "Foolish" Released: June 17, 2008

Units in the City is the debut solo studio album by American rapper Shawty Lo. It was released on February 26, 2008, via D4L/Asylum Records, marking the rapper's only album released during his lifetime. It features guest appearances from his fellow D4L members Stuntman and Mook B, as well as Lil Mark, 40, Braski, DG Yola, G-Child, Gucci Mane, Kool-Ace, Miss T and Phace Baity.

Supported by three singles: "Dey Know", "Dunn Dunn" and "Foolish", the album received negative reviews from critics, who found its production derivative and lyrical content devoid of mature topics. In the United States, the album debuted at number 13 on the Billboard 200, and numbers four and two on both the Top R&B/Hip-Hop Albums and Top Rap Albums charts.

== Critical reception ==
Professional ratings
Review scores
Source	Rating
AllMusic	3.5/5 stars
DJBooth	1.5/5
HipHopDX	1/5
RapReviews	1/10

The album received overwhelming negative reviews from music critics who despised the southern production and Shawty Lo's lyrical content. AllMusic's David Jeffries was the sole positive review for the album, commenting on Lo's flow feeling limited but said that it complimented the numerous hip-hop story tracks and few deviations into mature subject matter, all while combining both snap and trap music saying that "with some fun wordplay and the talent to hire all the right people for production and guest appearances, he's created the best album". DJBooth's Nathan Slavik criticized Lo for aping other rappers' style and using them to tell the same cliché hip-hop stories, saying "[T]here's just no way around it, Units In The City is a horrible album. Period". Alex Thorton of HipHopDX also criticized Lo for lacking a distinct delivery and trying to sound like T.I. and Jeezy, saying that "we certainly don't need another new rapper trying to remake their paths". Steve 'Flash' Juon of RapReviews criticized the album for showcasing Lo's average delivery for simple subject matters, concluding that, "The production and lyrics here are so awful I'm actually longing for Soulja Boy's album".

== Track listing ==
No.	Title	Writer(s)	Producer(s)	Length
1.	"100,000"	Carlos Walker; Teriyakie Nicodean Smith	Teriyakie Smith	3:38
2.	"They Know (Dey Know)"	Walker; Robert James Ingouma; Quandarious Antwan Jordan; Cory Way	Born Immaculate; Balis Beats	3:15
3.	"Dunn Dunn"	Q. Jordan; Smith; Way	Teriyakie Smith; Cory Way	3:17
4.	"Foolish"	Walker; Montay Desmond Humphrey; Way; Q. Jordan; Korey Robertson; Howard Simmons	DJ Montay	3:53
5.	"Let's Get It" (featuring D.G. Yola)	Walker; Mario Talley; Smith	Teriyakie Smith	4:15
6.	"Feels Good to Be Here"	Walker; Smith; Q. Jordan	Teriyakie Smith	3:34
7.	"Ain't Tellin' You" (featuring Phace Baity)	Walker; Aaron Barker; Jeremy Prather	Jeremy Prather	2:58
8.	"Cut the Check" (featuring Lil Mark and Braski)	Walker; Mark Robinson; Jimmy Turner; Smith	Teriyakie Smith	3:26
9.	"GA Lotto"	Walker; Smith	Teriyakie Smith	3:10
10.	"That's Shawty Lo"	Walker; Michael Armour, Jr.; Q. Jordan	Mike The Track Blazer	3:32
11.	"Easily I Approach"	Walker; Pharren Lowther	P. Lowther	3:19
12.	"Live My Life" (featuring Kool-Ace)	Walker; Brian Fleming; Q. Jordan; J. Jordan	J. Jeffries	2:46
13.	"Got Em 4 the Lo" (featuring Gucci Mane and Stuntman)	Walker; Radric Davis; Adrian Parks; Way	Cory Way	3:22
14.	"Count on Me" (featuring Miss T)	Walker; S. Epps; Q. Jordan; Ingouma	Rob Ingouma	3:18
15.	"We Gon Ride" (featuring Mook B, G-Child, Stuntman, Lil Mark and 40)	Walker; Dennis Butler; Parks; Catada Hilton; Rory Weems; Smith	Teriyakie Smith	3:17
Total length:				51:00

== Charts ==
=== Weekly charts ===
Chart (2008)	Peak position
US Billboard 200	13
US Top R&B/Hip-Hop Albums (Billboard)	4
US Top Rap Albums (Billboard)	2
US Tastemaker Albums (Billboard)	13

=== Year-end charts ===
Chart (2008)	Position
US Top R&B/Hip-Hop Albums (Billboard)	49
US Top Rap Albums (Billboard)	18
