= 2 Step (song) =

Single by Unk

from the album Beat'n Down Yo Block!
- B-side: "Beat'n Down Yo Block"
- Released: March 13, 2007 (U.S.)
- Recorded: 2006
- Genre: Southern hip hop
- Length: 3:15; 4:45 (remix/clean version); 5:25 (remix/explicit version)
- Label: Big Oomp Records/Koch Records
- Songwriters: Humphrey, Montay/Platt, Anthony/Shahid, Fard

Unk singles chronology
"Walk It Out" (2006)	"2 Step" (2007)	"Hit the Dance Floor" (2007)

"2 Step" is the second single from Unk's debut album Beat'n Down Yo Block!, released in 2007. It has an accompanying dance, called the "2 Step". The video was co-directed by Dale "Rage" Resteghini and Will Horton and was released on February 23, 2007 on Yahoo! Music. The official remix features T-Pain, Jim Jones and E-40.

The song debuted on the Billboard Hot 100 at number 94 in February 2007 and peaked at number 24. It also climbed to number 9 and number 4 on the R&B/Hip-Hop Songs and Hot Rap charts, respectively.

== Track listing ==
1. "2 Step (Clean)"
2. "2 Step (Explicit)"
3. "2 Step (Instrumental)"
4. "2 Step (A Cappella)"
5. "Beat'n Down Yo Block (Clean)"
6. "Beat'n Down Yo Block (Explicit)"
7. "Beat'n Down Yo Block (Instrumental)"
8. "Beat'n Down Yo Block (A Cappella)"

Both a cappellas are explicit.

== Charts ==
=== Weekly charts ===
Chart (2007)	Peak position
U.S. Billboard Hot 100	24
U.S. Billboard Hot R&B/Hip-Hop Songs	9
U.S. Billboard Hot Rap Tracks	4
U.S. Billboard Pop 100	32

=== Year-end charts ===
Chart (2007)	position
US Billboard Hot 100	78
US Hot R&B/Hip-Hop Songs (Billboard)	43
