= That's Right (Three 6 Mafia song) =

Single by Three 6 Mafia featuring Akon

from the album Last 2 Walk
- Released: July 19, 2008
- Recorded: 2008
- Genre: Hip-hop
- Label: Columbia, Sony BMG, Hypnotize Minds
- Songwriters: Paul Beauregard, Jordan Houston, Aliuane Thiam, Giorgio Tuinfort
- Producers: Akon, Giorgio Tuinfort

Three 6 Mafia singles chronology
| "Lolli Lolli (Pop That Body)" (2008) | "That's Right" (2008) | "Shake My" (2009) |

Music video
- "Three 6 Mafia - That's Right (Edited - Official HD Video) ft. Akon, Jim Jones" on YouTube

"That's Right" is the final single released by Three 6 Mafia from their studio album Last 2 Walk. It was released on July 19, 2008, and features Akon.

== Music video ==
A music video was released; it featured the group with Akon, but the song also featured a verse from Jim Jones that wasn't on the album.

== Charts ==
| Chart (2008) | Peak position |
|---|---|
| CIS Airplay (TopHit) | 190 |
| US Hot R&B/Hip-Hop Songs (Billboard) | 97 |
