= Spotlight (Gucci Mane song) =

Single by Gucci Mane featuring Usher

from the album The State vs. Radric Davis
- Released: October 19, 2009
- Recorded: 2009 {Kenya Moore, & June 2008 - Usher}
- Genre: Hip hop; R&B
- Length: 3:54
- Label: 1017 Brick Squad, Warner Bros., Asylum
- Songwriters: Radric Davis; Usher Raymond; Jamal Jones
- Producer: Polow da Don

Gucci Mane singles chronology
"Pretty Girls" (2009)	"Spotlight" (2009)	"Lemonade" (2009)

Usher singles chronology
"Papers" (2009)	"Spotlight" (2009)	"Fed Up" (2009)

"Spotlight" is the second official single by rapper, Gucci Mane from his studio album The State vs. Radric Davis (2009). The song features a guest appearance by American singer Usher. The single was released on October 19, 2009 and was produced by Polow da Don.

== Music video ==
The music video premiered on November 5, 2009. It shows Usher urging an upset Gucci Mane to come to his party. The video is directed by Benny Boom and has cameos from Eddie Murphy's oldest daughter Bria Murphy and Nicki Minaj of Young Money. It ranked at #56 on BET's Notarized: Top 100 Videos of 2009 countdown.

== Charts ==
On the week ending November 14, 2009, "Spotlight" debuted at number 93 on the Billboard Hot 100. It then fell to number 97 but rebounded the following week to number 86 and reached its final peak of number 42.

=== Weekly charts ===
Chart (2009–2010)	Peak Position
German Black Chart	16
Scottish Singles Sales (Official Charts)	71
UK Singles (The Official Charts Company)	46
UK R&B (The Official Charts Company)	16
US Billboard Hot 100	42
US Hot R&B/Hip-Hop Songs (Billboard)	15
US Rap Songs (Billboard)	8

=== Year-end charts ===
Chart (2010)	Position
US Hot R&B/Hip-Hop Songs (Billboard)	92

== Certifications ==
Region	Certification	Certified units/sales
United States (RIAA)	Gold	500,000^{‡}
^{‡} Sales+streaming figures based on certification alone.
