= Doe Boy Fresh =

Single by Three 6 Mafia featuring Chamillionaire

from the album Last 2 Walk (intended)
- Released: January 2, 2007
- Recorded: 2006
- Genre: Gangsta rap
- Length: 4:18
- Label: Columbia; Sony
- Songwriter(s): Paul Beauregard; Jordan Houston; Hakeem Seriki
- Producer(s): DJ Paul; Juicy J

Three 6 Mafia singles chronology
"Side 2 Side" (2006)	"Doe Boy Fresh" (2007)	"Like Money" (2007)

Chamillionaire singles chronology
"King Kong" (2006)	"Doe Boy Fresh" (2007)	"Hip Hop Police" (2007)

Music video
- "Three 6 Mafia - Doe Boy Fresh (Official Video) ft. Chamillionaire" on YouTube

"Doe Boy Fresh" is a song by rap group Three 6 Mafia, originally the first single from their ninth studio album, Last 2 Walk, but was ultimately cut from the album. The final track listing does not include the song, possibly due to the numerous album delays. The song features Chamillionaire. The song was released on January 2, 2007 as a digital download single on iTunes but was leaked in December 2006. For unknown reasons, the single was removed from the iTunes Store in early 2009. However, the other singles cut from the album, "Like Money" and "Sugar Daddy" remain in the store.

The music video premiered on MTV.com on February 9, 2007. Travis Barker makes an appearance in the video, which contains various people briefly being either Three 6 Mafia or Chamillionaire. Actor Tom Bower, from Die Hard 2 and The Hills Have Eyes, makes an appearance as the first portal viewer. The style of the video is inspired by the 1999 film Being John Malkovich where, due to a strange portal, entered the life of the titled actor. There is also an alternate "Doe Boy Fresh" version with a verse by Project Pat. The single reached number 54 on the Billboard Hot 100. It reached RIAA gold certification status on July 27, 2007.

== Chart ==
Chart (2007)	Peak position
U.S. Billboard Hot 100	54
U.S. Billboard Hot R&B/Hip-Hop Songs	74
U.S. Billboard Pop 100	60

== Certifications ==
Region	Certification	Certified units/sales
United States (RIAA) Mastertone	Gold	500,000^{*}
^{*} Sales figures based on certification alone.
