= D'Angel =

Jamaican musician, actress, model, and brand ambassador

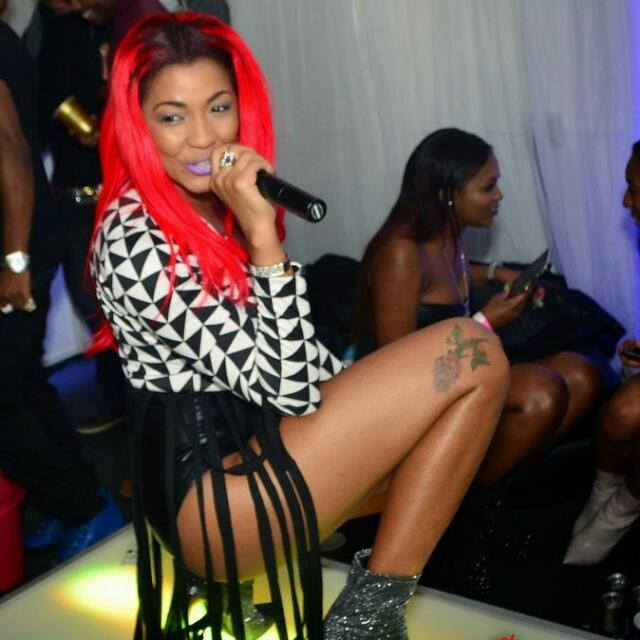
- D'Angel performing in Miami in 2019
- Born: Michelle Downer; 1 April 1978 (age 48); St. Catherine, Jamaica

Michelle Downer (born 1 April 1978), commonly known as D'Angel, is a Jamaican reggae singer, actress, model, and brand ambassador. She has also given motivational speeches. In 2017, she released No Worries with Spice. The Gleaner calls her the First Lady of dancehall.

== Biography ==
Born in Spanish Town, Jamaica, Downer sang in high school, modeled internationally in the 1990s, and returned home to Jamaica in 2002. D'Angel's father, Noel "Clive" Downer, was a local entrepreneur. D'Angel has an associate degree in Accounting and Management. She considers 2004 and 2005 to be her "breakout years," according to The Gleaner.

D’Angel had a celebrity marriage to singer, Beenie Man, in 2006 and they recorded the single One Man together. D'Angel and Beenie Man had a son together and split up in 2010, later reunited in 2011. They later divorced.

In 2013, D'Angel was banned for 5 years from performing at Sting by Isaiah Laing of Supreme Promotions. The reason for the ban was due to her impromptu performance of a "lyrical battle" with Ninja Man at Sting 30 that Laing considered "raunchy." She was also criticized for her choice of clothing at the event by Billboard, which described her outfit as "provocative" and "revealing."

In 2017, she went on tour in the United States with the theme of "We Can Survive" and addressing violence and crime through her song of the same name.

She was a performer at the 27th IRAWMA Awards in New York and a nominee for Best Female Deejay. She was honored as Singjay of 2008 at the 2009 EME Awards, and was a performer and presenter at the 28th IRAWMA Awards in New York, where she was nominated for Best Female Deejay. She won Digicel's People's Choice Award at the Style Observer Awards 2008. In 2017, she won the award for "Female Artiste of the Year" from the Entertainment Distinction Awards. She twice performed at Reggae Sumfest, Jamaica's largest reggae festival. The Gleaner praised her 2016 performance at "Galiday Bounce" in Ewarton.

Her song Stronger reached the top of Jamaica's music video charts. In 2017, she recorded the song "Whipped", a response to Dexta Daps' song Owner.

She has recorded with Jabari C.G. Productions LLC, Majestic Records, and Sweet Rains Records.

== Discography ==
- One
- Broad Smile
- El Pirata y la Sirena
