= Walk It Out (Unk song) =

Single by Unk

from the album Beat'n Down Yo Block!
- Released: August 2006
- Recorded: 2006
- Genre: Crunk; snap
- Length: 2:53; 4:55 (remix)
- Label: Big Oomp; Koch
- Songwriters: Montay Humphrey; Anthony Platt; Howard Simmons
- Producer: Unk

Unk singles chronology
"Walk It Out" (2006)	"2 Step" (2007)

"Walk It Out" is the debut single of Unk from his debut album Beat'n Down Yo Block! The song was played on the radio in Atlanta starting in March 2006 but did not gain popularity nationwide until September of that year. The song peaked at number 10 on the Billboard Hot 100, giving him the first top-ten single of his career.

The song was written by Montay Humphrey, Anthony Platt and Howard Simmons. The official remix was released in 2007 and lengthened to include four verses, featuring Outkast, Unk himself, and Jim Jones.

The song was performed at the 1st Annual BET Hip Hop Awards in 2006.

== Charts ==
=== Weekly charts ===
Chart (2006–2007)	Peak position
US Billboard Hot 100	10
US Hot R&B/Hip-Hop Songs (Billboard)	2
US Pop 100 (Billboard)	19
US Hot Rap Songs (Billboard)	2
US Rhythmic Airplay (Billboard)	16

=== Year-end charts ===
Chart (2006)	Position
US Hot R&B/Hip-Hop Songs (Billboard)	66

Chart (2007)	Position
US Billboard Hot 100	30
US Hot R&B/Hip-Hop Songs (Billboard)	21
US Rhythmic (Billboard)	33
