= Down for Life (album) =

Studio album by D4L
- Released: November 8, 2005
- Recorded: 2005
- Studio: D4L Studios (Atlanta, GA); PatchWerk Recording Studios (Atlanta, GA); Dee Money Studios (Atlanta, GA)
- Genre: Southern hip-hop; snap
- Length: 56:15
- Label: D4L; Dee Money; Hitt Hitt; Asylum; Atlantic
- Producer: Born Immaculate; D.J. Pooh; K-Rab; Kool-Ace; Midnight Black; Mook B; Slick B

Singles from Down for Life
- 1. "Laffy Taffy" Released: October 18, 2005; 2. "Betcha Can't Do It Like Me" Released: December 03, 2005

Professional ratings
Review scores
Source	Rating
AllMusic	2.5/5 stars
RapReviews	2.5/10

Down for Life is the only studio album by Southern hip-hop group D4L. It was released on November 8, 2005 via Shawty Lo's D4L Records, Dee Money Entertainment, and Asylum Records. Recording sessions took place at D4L Studios, PatchWerk Recording Studios and Dee Money Studios in Atlanta. Production was handled by Born Immaculate, D.J. Pooh, K-Rab, Kool-Ace, Midnight Black, Mook B and Slick B. It features guest appearances from Kool-Ace, Too $hort and Sweets.

In the United States, the album debuted at number 22 on the Billboard 200, number 4 on the Top R&B/Hip-Hop Albums and number 3 on the Top Rap Albums charts, selling above 36,000 copies in its first week. The album sold 230,000 copies in its opening two months at a retail price of $18.98.

The album was supported with two charted singles: "Laffy Taffy" and "Betcha Can't Do It Like Me". Its lead single, "Laffy Taffy", peaked atop the US Billboard Hot 100 and was certified three times platinum by the Recording Industry Association of America. The second and final single off of the album, "Betcha Can't Do It Like Me", made it to number 72 on the Billboard Hot 100 and was certified gold by the RIAA.

== Track listing ==
No.	Title	Writer(s)	Producer(s)	Length
1.	"Bankhead"	Lefabian Williams; Dennis Butler; Adrian Parks; Cory Way	Born Immaculate	3:59
2.	"Laffy Taffy"	Williams; Butler; Parks; Richard Sims	K-Rab	3:44
3.	"What Can U Do"	Williams; Butler; Parks	Born Immaculate	3:22
4.	"Stuntman"	Williams; Parks	Slick B	3:33
5.	"Do It Like Me Baby"	Williams; Butler; Parks; Sims	D.J. Pooh; K-Rab	3:29
6.	"Front Street"	Williams; Butler; Parks; Brian Fleming	Mook B	3:30
7.	"Scotty"	Williams; Barry Adams	Slick B	4:08
8.	"Betcha Can't Do It Like Me"	Williams; Butler; Mark Robinson; Carlos Walker	D.J. Pooh	3:41
9.	"I'm da Man"	Williams; Butler; Parks	K-Rab	4:07
10.	"Diggin' Me"	Williams; Butler; Parks; Walker	Midnight Black	4:53
11.	"Get Real Low"	Williams; Butler; Parks; Adams	Slick B	3:53
12.	"Make It Rain" (featuring 2 Short, Sweets and Kool-Ace)	Williams; Butler; Fleming	Stack'em Ace	4:40
13.	"Shittin' Me"	Williams; Butler; Parks; Zedrick Love; Sims	K-Rab	5:14
14.	"Game Owe Me" (featuring Kool-Ace)	Williams; Butler; Parks; Fleming	Kool-Ace; Mook B	4:02
Total length:				56:15

== Personnel ==
- Lefabian "Fabo" Williams – vocals
- Adrian "Stoney/Stuntman" Parks – vocals
- Dennis "Mook B" Butler – vocals, producer, recording
- Carlos "Shawty Lo" Walker – vocals, executive producer
- Brian "Kool-Ace" Fleming – vocals, producer
- Todd "Too Short" Shaw – vocals
- Sweets – vocals
- Born Immaculate – producer, recording
- Richard W. "K-Rab" Sims, Jr. – producer, recording
- Slick B – producer, recording
- D.J. Pooh – producer, recording
- Tracey "Midnight Black" Sewell – producer
- Mike Wilson – recording, mixing
- Glen Schick – mastering
- Dee Money – executive producer
- Zach Wolfe – cover photo

== Charts ==
=== Weekly charts ===
Chart (2005)	Peak position
US Billboard 200	22
US Top R&B/Hip-Hop Albums (Billboard)	4
US Top Rap Albums (Billboard)	3

=== Year-end charts ===
Chart (2006)	Position
US Billboard 200	155
US Top R&B/Hip-Hop Albums (Billboard)	57
