= Baby D (rapper) =

American rapper (born 1977)

- Also known as: Dizzle
- Born: Donald Bernard Jenkins; November 5, 1983 (age 42)
- Origin: Atlanta, Georgia, U.S.
- Genres: Hip hop
- Occupation: Rapper
- Years active: 2000–present
- Labels: Big Oomp Records (2000–10); Sony Urban Music; Epic; Koch (2007–08)
- Website: twitter.com/babydamg

Donald Bernard Jenkins (born November 5, 1983), better known as Dizzle and Baby D, is an underground rapper from Atlanta. His first album, Off Da Chain, was released in 2000 on Big Oomp Records. Two years later his follow up, Lil' Chopper Toy was released. A major label bidding war ensued, garnering the young MC a multimillion-dollar deal with Epic Records. He was signed with Koch Records, and released his first mainstream album, A-Town Secret Weapon, on April 29, 2008. Three years later, in 2011, Baby D signed with Mizay Entertainment.

In March 2012, Baby D changed his stage name to Dizzle. On November 1, 2012, he released his third independent album entitled About My Grind. He also created his own label, AMG, or Alliance Music Group.

== Personal life ==
=== Legal issues ===
Jenkins was arrested in March 2008 for assault and cocaine trafficking. Federal charges, as well as warrants in Georgia and Tennessee, ultimately led to his arrest in Butler County, Ohio. Contrary to these allegations, Jenkins claimed in a 2010 interview with hiphopbeef.com that his trust and involvement with the wrong people led to the consequence of imprisonment. He was released from prison in 2010, and remained on house arrest until late 2011.

== Discography ==
=== Studio albums ===
List of studio albums, with selected chart positions and sales figures
Title	Album details	Peak chart positions		
Title	Album details	US Heat	US R&B	US Rap
A-Town Secret Weapon	Released: April 29, 2008; Label: Big Oomp Records, Epic Records, Koch Records; Format: CD, digital download	25	53	22
A.S.W Pt. 2	Released: TBA, 2013; Label: Alliance Music Group, Mizay; Format: CD, digital download	TBR	TBR	TBR

=== Independent albums ===
Album details
Off da Chain
- Released: July 25, 2000
- Label: Big Oomp Records
- Format: CD, digital download, LP
Lil' Chopper Toy
- Released: September 10, 2002
- Label: Big Oomp Records
- Format: digital download, LP
About My Grind
- Released: November 1, 2012
- Label: Alliance Music Group
- Format: digital download, LP

=== Singles ===
==== As a lead artists ====
List of singles, with selected chart positions, showing year released and album name
Title	Year	Peak chart positions			Album
Title	Year	US	US R&B	US Rap	Album
"It's Going Down" (featuring Bone Crusher & Dru)	2003	—	88	—	NFL Street – Soundtrack
"I'm Bout Money" (featuring Blazed)	2008	—	97	—	A-Town Secret Weapon
"—" denotes a recording that did not chart or was not released in that territory.

==== As a featured artist ====
List of singles, with selected chart positions, showing year released and album name
Title	Year	Peak chart positions			Album
Title	Year	US	US R&B	US Rap	Album
"Hit the Dance Floor Remix" (Unk featuring Baby D)	2007	—	84	—	Beat'n Down Yo Block!
"—" denotes a recording that did not chart or was not released in that territory.

=== Guest appearances ===
- 1995: "Thangs Change" (Too $hort featuring Mali, Jamal from Illegal & Baby D)
- 1996: "Baby D" (Too $hort featuring Baby D)
- 2002: "Who U Is" (Rasheeda featuring Baby D, 404 Soldierz & Noodoz)
- 2004: "Drama!" (DJ Kay Slay featuring Lil Jon, Bun B, David Banner & Baby D)
- 2004: "We Ain't Playin" (Lil' Flip featuring Killer Mike, Baby D & Pastor Troy)
- 2007: "Hit The Dance Floor Remix" (Unk featuring Baby D)
- 2007: "Hold On Ho!" (Unk featuring Baby D & Parlae of Dem Franchize Boyz)
- 2009: "Air Forces Remix" (Young Jeezy featuring Baby D)
- 2009: "I'm a Boss" (Young Jeezy featuring Bleu Davinci & Baby D)

=== Music videos ===
- 2000: "Eastside vs Westside" (featuring Lil' C)
- 2003: "It's Going Down" (featuring Bone Crusher & Dru)
- 2007: "Hit The Dance Floor Remix" (Unk featuring Baby D)
- 2007: "I'm Bout Money" (featuring Blazed)
- 2007: "Do It"
- 2010: "Here We Go Again"
- 2010: "Lock Down"
- 2012: "One Night Sum" (featuring Gucci Mane)
- 2012: "Here We Go"
