= Laffy Taffy (song) =

Single by D4L

from the album Down for Life
- Released: 2005
- Recorded: 2005
- Studio: PatchWerk Recording Studios (Atlanta, Georgia)
- Genre: Snap
- Length: 3:44
- Label: WEA
- Songwriters: Lafabian Williams, Adrian Parks, Dennis Butler, Cory Way, Broderick Thompson Smith, Michael Johnson
- Producer: K-Rab

D4L singles chronology
| "Laffy Taffy" (2005) | "Betcha Can't Do It Like Me" (2006) |

"Laffy Taffy" is a 2005 song by Atlanta-based hip hop group D4L which reached number one on the Billboard Hot 100 in January 2006. The song's success on the charts was largely due to its enormous online sales. The music video version of the song samples and interpolates elements of "Candy Girl" by New Edition, whereas the CD single version of the song excludes the sampling. The song was produced by Born Immaculate, Broderick Thompson Smith and "K-Rab", and the music video was directed by Thomas Forbes.

== Criticism ==
During "The Champ" from 2006's Fishscale, Ghostface Killah asks "My arts is crafty darts/ while y'all stuck on Laffy Taffy/Wondering, how'd y'all niggas get past me?" Ghostface had mocked the "snap dance" during his 2005 tour. There has also been controversy on who wrote "Laffy Taffy". Rapper Liam "Smack Eyes" Thomas claims that the group had stolen the lyrics from his rhyme book.

== Charts ==
=== Weekly charts ===
Weekly chart performance for "Laffy Taffy"
| Chart (2005–2006) | Peak position |
|---|---|
| Australia (ARIA) | 53 |
| Germany (GfK) | 61 |
| Ireland (IRMA) | 48 |
| New Zealand (Recorded Music NZ) | 25 |
| Scottish Singles Sales (Official Charts) | 31 |
| UK Singles (Official Charts) | 29 |
| UK Hip Hop/R&B (Official Charts) | 6 |
| US Billboard Hot 100 | 1 |
| US Hot R&B/Hip-Hop Songs (Billboard) | 15 |
| US Hot Rap Songs (Billboard) | 6 |
| US Pop Airplay (Billboard) | 14 |

=== Year-end charts ===
Year-end chart performance for "Laffy Taffy"
| Chart (2006) | Position |
|---|---|
| UK Urban (Music Week) | 28 |
| US Billboard Hot 100 | 46 |
| US Hot R&B/Hip-Hop Songs (Billboard) | 83 |

== Certifications ==
| Region | Certification | Certified units/sales |
|---|---|---|
| United States (RIAA) | Gold | 500,000^{^} |
| United States (RIAA) Mastertone | 3× Platinum | 3,000,000^{*} |
^{*} Sales figures based on certification alone.^{^} Shipments figures based on certification alone.

== Release history ==
Release dates and formats for "Stay Fly"
| Region | Date | Format | Label(s) | Ref. |
|---|---|---|---|---|
| United States | November 15, 2005 | Mainstream airplay | Asylum; Atlantic | |

== See also ==
- List of Billboard Hot 100 number ones of 2006
