= Dey Know =

Single by Shawty Lo

from the album Units in the City
- Released: December 4, 2007
- Recorded: 2007
- Genre: Southern hip hop
- Length: 3:17
- Label: D4L, Asylum, Warner Bros.
- Songwriters: Jerold D. Evans, Carlos Walker, Sean B. Whittington
- Producers: Balis Beats, Born Immaculate

Shawty Lo singles chronology
"Dey Know" (2007)	"Dunn Dunn" (2008)

"Dey Know" (sometimes called "They Know") is a song by American hip hop recording artist Shawty Lo, released on December 4, 2007, as his commercial debut single. The song also serves as the lead single from Shawty Lo's debut solo album, Units in the City. The track was produced by Balis Beats and Born Immaculate, who sampled Mandrill's "Children of the Sun".

== Music video ==
The song's music video was directed by President Thomas Forbes. The video features cameo appearances from Camp 22, Rasheeda, Buckeey and Crime Mob.

== Remixes ==
The song was officially remixed in January 2008, billed as the "Dirty South Remix". The remix features guest verses from Shawty Lo's fellow Southern hip hop artists, Ludacris, Young Jeezy, Plies and Lil Wayne. The song was remixed a second time featuring Young Jeezy, E-40, Plies and Gorilla Zoe. The first remix is notable for having Lil Wayne rap through an auto-tune, which alters one's voice and makes it sound synthesized. This technique was made popular in hip-hop and R&B by T-Pain, and was used in many of Wayne's verses and songs from 2008 and 2009, this being one of the first. There is also an "NY Remix" featuring New York hip hop artists Maino, Lil' Kim and Busta Rhymes.

Several rappers have also recorded unofficial remixes as well as freestyles, including Yo Gotti, Rick Ross, Young Jeezy, Paul Wall, Papoose, Bun B, Kardinal Offishall, Rock City, Re-Up Gang, Crooked I, Casely, Driver and Prefuse 73, among others.

== Charts ==
=== Weekly charts ===
Chart (2007–2008)	Peak position
US Billboard Hot 100	31
US Hot R&B/Hip-Hop Songs (Billboard)	8
US Hot Rap Songs (Billboard)	3
US Pop 100 (Billboard)	59
US Rhythmic Airplay (Billboard)	12

=== Year-end charts ===
Chart (2008)	Position
US Hot R&B/Hip-Hop Songs (Billboard)	34
