= Unk =

American rapper (1981–2025)

- Also known as: DJ Unk
- Born: Anthony Leonard Platt; November 28, 1981; Atlanta, Georgia, U.S.
- Died: January 24, 2025 (aged 43) College Park, Georgia, U.S.
- Genres: Southern hip-hop; snap
- Occupations: Rapper; disc jockey; hype man
- Years active: 1998–2025
- Labels: E1; Big Oomp

Anthony Leonard Platt (November 28, 1981 – January 24, 2025), better known by his stage name Unk, was an American rapper, DJ, and hype man. He is best known for his 2006 snap hit "Walk It Out".

== Life and career ==
Platt began spinning records in 1998, and, after meeting DJ Jelly and DJ Montay, joined their DJ entourage, the Southern Style DJs. They performed for high school parties, proms, pep rallies, and other events around the state of Georgia. In 2000, Big Oomp signed Unk to his label, Big Oomp Records. He released the album Beat'n Down Yo Block! in 2006 led by the single "Walk It Out" that reached the top ten in the Billboard Hot 100. In 2008, he released the album 2econd Season, supported by the single "Show Out" to moderate success. In 2013, he released the single "Have A Toast" followed by "Wait" in 2014, while he continued to tour the college circuit.

== Death ==
In 2009, Platt suffered a mild heart attack that resulted in a reduced profile. On January 24, 2025, Platt's wife confirmed through social media that he had died at the age of 43. According to TMZ, his cause of death was a heart attack.

== Discography ==
=== Albums ===
==== Studio albums ====
List of albums, with selected chart positions
Title	Album details	Peak chart positions		
Title	Album details	US	US R&B	US Rap
Beat'n Down Yo Block!	Released: October 3, 2006; Label: Big Oomp, Koch; Format: CD, digital download	109	21	8
2econd Season	Released: November 4, 2008; Label: Big Oomp, Koch; Format: CD, digital download	104	15	6

==== Mixtapes ====
- 2009: Itsago The Mixtape Vol.1
- 2009: Smoke On
- 2009: ATL Off Da Chain

=== Singles ===
==== As lead artist ====
List of singles, with selected chart positions and certifications, showing year released and album name
Title	Year	Peak chart positions			Certifications	Album
Title	Year	US	US R&B	US Rap	Certifications	Album
"Walk It Out"	2006	10	2	2	RIAA: Platinum	Beat'n Down Yo Block!
"2 Step"	2006	24	9	4	RIAA: Gold	Beat'n Down Yo Block!
"Hit the Dance Floor" (featuring Baby D)	2007	—	84	—		Beat'n Down Yo Block!
"Show Out"	2008	—	46	17		2econd Season
Get Em Up	2012	—	—	—		Non-album singles
Trap it Out	2013	—	—	—		Non-album singles
Have a Toast (feat. Louis Rocc)	2013	—	—	—		Non-album singles
Wait	2014	—	—	—		Non-album singles
Alive (feat. Erica Leigh) with Another Monster	2015	—	—	—		Non-album singles
"—" denotes a recording that did not chart.

==== As featured performer ====
List of singles, with selected chart positions, showing year released and album name
Title	Year	Peak chart positions	Album
Title	Year	US R&B	Album
"Video" (Johntá Austin featuring Unk)	2007	—	Non-album singles
"Rock On (Do the Rockman)" (Montana featuring Unk)	2007	64	Non-album singles
"I'd Rather" (Three 6 Mafia featuring Unk)	2008	98	Last 2 Walk
"—" denotes a recording that did not chart.
