= Foolish (Shawty Lo song) =

- Remix cover.

Single by Shawty Lo

from the album Units in the City
- Released: 2008
- Recorded: 2007
- Genre: Hip hop; Southern hip hop
- Length: 3:53
- Label: D4L; Asylum; Warner Bros.
- Songwriters: Montay Humphrey; Quandarious A. Jordan; Korey Robertson; Howard Simmons
- Producers: DJ Montay; Born Immaculate

Shawty Lo singles chronology
"Dunn Dunn" (2007)	"Foolish" (2008)	"Foolish (Remix)" (2008)

"Foolish" is the third single from rapper Shawty Lo's debut album Units in the City. The song was officially released and added on iTunes on June 17, 2008.

== Music video ==
The music video is first seen at the end of Shawty Lo's video for his previous single, "Dunn Dunn." The remix is the continuation for it. The MTV version of the remix video edits the part that says "cross your t's and dot your i's". This is actually a direct reference to fellow Atlanta rapper T.I., with whom Shawty Lo has a well-publicized amity.

== Remix ==
The official remix features DJ Khaled, Birdman, Rick Ross and Jim Jones. Birdman uses the Auto-Tune effect on his verse in the remix. Rick Ross mentions his album Trilla going #1 and topping Snoop Dogg's Ego Trippin. The remix has also been included as a Best Buy exclusive bonus track on DJ Khaled's album We Global. The music video for the remix is the continuation of the original that can be seen at the end of the "Dunn Dunn" video. Pitbull, Jadakiss, Lil Wayne, Ace Hood and Gunplay of Triple C's make cameo appearances in the video.

=== Freestyles ===
Chamillionaire has released two freestyles of this song on Mixtape Messiah 4. One was entitled "On the Grind Homie" and the other was called "Top Down, Money Up". An interesting fact is that the original freestyle (released on the Internet before the mixtape's release) had the chopped and screwed hook of "Top Down, Money Up" and the verse of "On the Grind Homie". For an unknown reason, another freestyle and hook were recorded, and "Top Down, Money Up" received the new verse, as opposed to "On the Grind Homie" getting the new hook.

== Charts ==
=== Weekly charts ===
Chart (2008)	Peak position
US Bubbling Under Hot 100 (Billboard)	2
US Hot R&B/Hip-Hop Songs (Billboard)	29
US Hot Rap Songs (Billboard)	13
US Rhythmic Airplay (Billboard)	39

=== Year-end charts ===
Chart (2008)	Position
US Hot R&B/Hip-Hop Songs (Billboard)	88
