= D4L =

American hip hop group

- Origin: Atlanta, Georgia, U.S.
- Genres: Southern hip hop; snap
- Years active: 2003–2006
- Labels: D4L, Dee Money, Asylum
- Past members: Fabo; Mook-B; Stoney (Stuntman); Shawty Lo

D4L (an acronym of Down for Life) was an American hip hop group formed in 2003, composed of Atlanta-based rappers Fabo, Mook-B, Stoney, and Shawty Lo. They are best known for their 2005 hit single "Laffy Taffy", which peaked at number one on the Billboard Hot 100 in January 2006.

== History ==
Shawty Lo (born Carlos Walker) self-funded the group in its early days. He explained that the group's name stands for "Down for Life". D4L signed to the independent Dee Money Entertainment, which released the group's debut in conjunction with Asylum Records. The group debuted with "Betcha Can't Do It Like Me", which Billboard claimed to have popularized snap music. In January 2006, D4L's single "Laffy Taffy" reached the top of the Billboard Hot 100 chart. Like fellow Atlanta rap group Dem Franchize Boyz, D4L was part of the snap music trend of the mid-2000s, which arguably peaked when rapper Soulja Boy Tell 'Em came out with the number one hit song "Crank That (Soulja Boy)" in 2007.

The group's debut album Down for Life, was released jointly by Dee Money Entertainment and Asylum Records, in November 2005. Following their immediate success, the group went on tour. While being promoted through Outreach Entertainment, they performed alongside several of the Midwest's then up-and-coming artists, most notably the Joplin, Missouri-based hip hop duo Midwest Connect composed of Southeast Kansas artist Brent Ward (Koo-Laid) and St. Louis rapper/artist Neno Black. Several other accredited and up-and-coming artists also performed alongside the group at the Oakley-Lindsay Civic Center in Quincy, IL. As other performances soon followed the group's popularity continued to soar.

"Laffy Taffy" achieved continued success on the charts, largely due to its significant online sales. It was produced by Cory Way p/k/a Born Immaculate, Broderick Thompson Smith and Richard Sims p/k/a K-Rab. The song samples and interpolates elements of "Candy Girl" by New Edition. There are several remixes of the song, most notably the official remix featuring rapper Busta Rhymes. Another version featured the Chicago rapper Twista. However, as the group celebrated their success with the single "Laffy Taffy" (a Multi-Platinum hit), they quickly garnered criticism from the hip hop establishment. On the track "The Champ" from 2006's FishScale, Ghostface Killah asks "Y'all stuck on Laffy Taffy/Wonderin' how'd y'all niggas get past me?" Ghostface had previously mocked the "snap dance" during his 2005 tour. There has also been controversy on who wrote the lyrics to "Laffy Taffy". Rapper Liam "Smack Eyes" Thomas claims that the group stole the lyrics from his rhyme book. After D4L's debut album, Shawty Lo embarked on a solo career.

== Members ==
- Shawty Lo (Carlos Walker, died 2016)
- Fabo (Lefabian Williams)
- Mook B (Dennis Butler)
- Stoney (Adrian Parks)

== Discography ==
=== Studio albums ===
| Title | Album details | Peak chart positions | | | Certifications (sales threshold) |
| Title | Album details | US | US R&B | US Rap | Certifications (sales threshold) |
|---|---|---|---|---|---|
| Down for Life | Release date: November 8, 2005; Label: Ice Age Entertainment, Dee Money Entertainment, Asylum Records, Atlantic Records; Formats: CD, music download | 22 | 4 | 3 | RIAA: Gold |

=== Singles ===
| Title | Year | Peak chart positions | | | | | | | | Certifications (sales threshold) | Album |
| Title | Year | US | US R&B | US Rap | US Pop | AUS | IRE | NZ | UK | Certifications (sales threshold) | Album |
|---|---|---|---|---|---|---|---|---|---|---|---|
| "Laffy Taffy" | 2005 | 1 | 15 | 6 | 14 | 53 | 48 | 25 | 29 | RIAA: 3× Platinum | Down for Life |
| "Betcha Can't Do It Like Me" | 2006 | 72 | 23 | 13 | — | — | — | — | — | RIAA: Gold | Down for Life |
"—" denotes releases that did not chart or were not released to that country
