= Lemonade (Gucci Mane song) =

2009 song by Gucci Mane

Single by Gucci Mane

from the album The State vs. Radric Davis
- Released: December 7, 2009
- Genre: Southern hip-hop
- Length: 4:06
- Label: 1017 Brick Squad; Warner Bros.; Asylum
- Songwriters: Radric Davis; Shondrae Crawford
- Producer: Bangladesh

Gucci Mane singles chronology
"Spotlight" (2009)	"Lemonade" (2009)	"Bingo" (2010)

"Lemonade" is a song by American rapper Gucci Mane, and the third official single from his sixth studio album The State vs. Radric Davis (2009). The single was released on December 7, 2009 and was produced by Bangladesh. The song interpolates and samples "Keep It Warm" by comedy rock duo Flo & Eddie, from their 1976 album Moving Targets, and incorporates the voices of children singing the song's chorus.

== Reception ==
AllMusic said: "Some of the best beats on The State vs. Radric Davis come by way of Bangladesh, who drops some seriously roll slowing Atlanta heat on "Lemonade". Now commented: "One song on the album is simply about the color yellow." According to The Washington Post: "Expect to hear the delirious kick of this song beneath rolled-up windows all winter long. Over sparkling piano trills and growling bass, Gucci counts off his earthly possessions, all of which appear to come in a shade of yellow: jewelry, wall-to-wall carpeting, a yacht, even a little yellow Corvette. It's not rote boasting. It's the sound of a beleaguered rap star outlining what happens when life hands him lemons." XXL commented: "The bouncy “Lemonade,” where Gooch gushes over his lemon-colored rims and lemon-flavored weed, is clever, but ultimately it could’ve been left on the cutting-room floor." Billboard posted: "The comical song is about diamond-encrusted jewelry." According to Coke Machine Glow: "Lemonade" has made the blog rounds and proven it's got both ride and bounce for miles, all Gucci leer and "Hard Knock Life" chorus shift."

== Remixes ==
The official remix features Trey Songz, Fabolous and Nicki Minaj. The verses of Fabolous and Nicki Minaj are both samples from the former's song "For The Money". Nicki Minaj's verse is 16 bars in "For The Money", but in the "Lemonade" remix, her last four bars are cut from the song, and then it goes back to the chorus.

Several rappers including Bun B, Yelawolf, Curren$y, Big Sean, Tyler, The Creator, Earl Sweatshirt, Action Bronson, Stat Quo, Kyle, PARTYNEXTDOOR, Joell Ortiz, Babytron, and Pooh Shiesty have also recorded freestyles using the track.

== Charts ==
=== Weekly charts ===
Chart (2009–2023)	Peak position
Hungary (Single Top 40)	38
US Billboard Hot 100	53
US Hot R&B/Hip-Hop Songs (Billboard)	15
US Hot Rap Songs (Billboard)	8
US Rhythmic Airplay (Billboard)	21

=== Year-end charts ===
Chart (2010)	Position
US Hot R&B/Hip-Hop Songs (Billboard)	63

== Certifications ==
Region	Certification	Certified units/sales
United States (RIAA)	2× Platinum	2,000,000^{‡}
^{‡} Sales+streaming figures based on certification alone.
