= DJ Montay =

American record producer from Georgia

- Also known as: Mickey, Montay
- Born: Montay Desmond Humphrey; 4 December 1978 (age 47)
- Genres: Hip hop; R&B
- Occupations: Record producer; songwriter; disc jockey
- Instruments: Keyboards; music sequencer; drum machine; synthesizer; sampler; turntables
- Years active: 2000–present
- Label: Big Oomp
- Website: www.djmontay.com

Montay Desmond Humphrey (born December 4, 1978), known professionally as DJ Montay, is an American disc jockey, record producer and songwriter, who has worked with artists such as Flo Rida, T-Pain, Akon, Future, and Migos. He has a producer credit on Flo Rida's "Low”, which was one of the most successful singles of the 2000s. DJ Montay has had his productions featured in films such as Step Up 3D, Stomp the Yard, and Norbit.

== Career ==
DJ Montay first came to prominence in 2006 with the hit single "Walk It Out", produced for Unk. The song peaked at number one on the Billboard Hot R&B/Hip-Hop Songs chart. He also produced a remix, which featured Andre 3000, Jim Jones and Big Boi. Shortly after, he produced another hit "2 Step", the follow-up single from Unk's debut album Beat’n Down Yo Block, distributed by Koch Entertainment. It reached the Billboard top ten, with the remix featuring appearances from artists such as T-Pain, Jim Jones and E-40.

In 2008, DJ Montay produced his number one hit "Low" by Flo Rida featuring T-Pain. "Low" was one of the year's biggest songs and earned DJ Montay two Grammy nominations. In 2009, he followed up with "Sugar" for Flo Rida featuring Wynter Gordon, which peaked at number 5 on the Billboard Hot 100; "Who the Fuck Is that" by Dolla featuring Akon and T-Pain; "I’d Rather" for Three 6 Mafia, and "Creepin" by Chamillionaire featuring Ludacris.

DJ Montay is credited for "Foolish" by Shawty Lo, which reached No. 20 on the Billboard Radio Songs chart, and "Money Can't Buy" by Ne-Yo featuring Young Jeezy, which reached No. 41 on the Billboard Hot R&B/Hip-Hop Songs chart. Other songs include "Mainstream Ratchet" and "So We Can Live" from 2 Chainz's second studio album B.O.A.T.S. II: Me Time; T.I.'s "Can You Learn" from his Trouble Man album featuring R. Kelly, "Twisted" by Gorilla Zoe featuring Lil Jon; “Oh Yeah” by Plies featuring Chris Brown; and "Everybody Drunk" from Ludacris's Battle of the Sexes album.

His most recent credits include “I Like Dat” by T-Pain featuring Kehlani, which peaked at No. 97 on the Billboard Hot 100, and "Walk It Talk It" by Migos featuring Drake, which peaked at No. 10 on the Hot 100.

== Discography ==
=== Singles produced ===
List of singles produced, with selected chart positions and certifications, showing year released and album name
Title	Year	Peak chart positions						Certifications	Album
Title	Year	US	US R&B	US Rap	CAN	FRA	UK	Certifications	Album
"I Luv Her" (Glorilla featuring T-Pain)	2024	70	18	18	—	—	—	—	—: RIAA: Platinum
"Hollon" (Glorilla)	2024	48		21	—	—	—	—	—: RIAA: Gold
"I Like Dat" (T-Pain featuring Kehlani)	2021	97	36	—	—	—	—	—	—: RIAA: Gold
"Money Can't Buy" (Ne-Yo featuring Young Jeezy)	2014	—	41	—	—	—	—	—	Non-Fiction
"Twisted" (Gorilla Zoe featuring Lil Jon)	2011	77	63	—	—	—	—	—	King Kong
"Sugar" (Flo Rida featuring Wynter Gordon)	2009	5	100	10	—	—	—	RIAA: Platinum; Music Canada: Gold	R.O.O.T.S.
"Low" (Flo Rida featuring T-Pain)	2008	1	9	1	3	33	2	RIAA: Diamond; BPI: Platinum; IFPI Switzerland: Platinum; RMNZ: 2× Platinum; BVMI: Gold; IFPI Denmark: Gold; Music Canada: 3× Platinum; ARIA 3× Platinum	Mail on Sunday
"2 Step" (DJ Unk)	2007	24	9	4	—	—	—	RIAA: Gold	Beat'n Down Yo Block!
"Walk It Out" (DJ Unk)	2007	10	2	2	—	—	—	RIAA: Platinum	Beat'n Down Yo Block!
"Foolish" (Shawty Lo)	2007	102	29	13	—	—	—	—	Units in the City
"Who the Fuck Is That?" (Dolla featuring Akon and T-Pain)	2007	82	42	21	—	—	—	—	A Dolla and a Dream
"—" denotes a recording that did not chart or was not released in that territory.

== Awards and nominations ==
Year	Type	Award	Result
2009	Grammy Awards	Best Rap Song	Nominated
2009	Grammy Awards	Best Rap/Sung Collaboration	Nominated
2009	BMI Pop Awards	Award Winning Songs	Won
2008	Ozone Awards	Best Producer Award	Nominated
2008	BMI Urban Awards	Producer of the Year	Nominated
