= Shawty Lo =

American rapper (1976–2016)

- Born: Carlos Rico Walker; March 22, 1976; Atlanta, Georgia, U.S.
- Died: September 21, 2016 (aged 40) Fulton County, Georgia, U.S.
- Genres: Southern hip hop; trap
- Occupations: Rapper; songwriter; record producer
- Instrument: Vocals
- Years active: 1996–2016
- Labels: D4L • 1017 Brick Squad; 300; Atlantic; Asylum; G-Unit South; Warner Bros.
- Formerly of: D4L
- Children: 11
- Website: www.shawtylo.com

Carlos Rico Walker (March 22, 1976 – September 21, 2016), better known by his stage name Shawty Lo, was an American rapper from Atlanta, Georgia. He is a founding member of the Southern hip hop group D4L, who were best known for their 2005 single "Laffy Taffy" — which topped the Billboard Hot 100 and received double platinum certification by the Recording Industry Association of America (RIAA).

His 2007 debut single, "Dey Know", peaked within the top 40 of the Billboard Hot 100. It preceded his debut studio album, Units in the City (2008), which peaked at number 13 on the Billboard 200.

On September 21, 2016, Walker died in a car crash. His second studio album, R.I.C.O., was released posthumously in March 2017.

== Music career ==
=== 2000–06: Career beginnings with D4L ===
In 2003, Shawty Lo formed the Southern hip hop group D4L, with fellow Atlanta-based rappers Fabo, Mook-B and Stoney. Shawty Lo subsequently launched his indie record label D4L Records. Shawty Lo self-funded the group in its early days. He explained that the group's name stands for "Down for Life". The group signed to the indie label Dee Money Entertainment, which released the group's debut in conjunction with Asylum Records.

D4L's debut album, titled Down for Life, was executive produced by Shawty Lo and eventually certified gold by the Recording Industry Association of America (RIAA). The album had spawned the hit singles "Betcha Can't Do It Like Me" and "Laffy Taffy". The latter of which attributed much to the group's success, as it broke records as the most downloaded song in the history of music according to the 2007 Guinness Book of the World Records. It was also a multi-platinum ring tone and scored a ASCAP award.

The group debuted with "Betcha Can't Do It Like Me", which Billboard claimed to have popularized snap music. In January 2006, D4L's single "Laffy Taffy", reached the top of the Billboard Hot 100 chart. As was another Atlanta-based hip hop group Dem Franchize Boyz, D4L was part of the snap music trend in 2006, which continued when Mississippi-based rapper Soulja Boy Tell 'Em, came out with the number one hit single "Crank That (Soulja Boy)", in 2007.

=== 2007–08: Solo career and debut album ===
On December 4, 2007, Shawty Lo released "Dey Know", his solo commercial debut single. The single charted in the Top 40 of the US Billboard Hot 100 chart. On February 26, 2008, his solo debut studio album Units in the City, was released. The album features guest appearances from Shawty Lo's D4L cohorts, as well as Gucci Mane, among others. Units in the City peaked at number 14 on the US Billboard 200 chart and at number two on the Top Rap Albums chart, selling over 160,000 copies to date. The album spawned two other singles, "Dunn Dunn" and the remix to "Foolish". Shawty Lo also released a music video for the album cut, "Got Em 4 da LO". The songs "Dey Know" and "Foolish", were both officially remixed, featuring new verses from several high-profile artists. These include Ludacris, Young Jeezy, Plies, Lil' Wayne, DJ Khaled, Birdman, Rick Ross and Jim Jones. The "Foolish" music video also included cameo appearances from Pitbull, Jadakiss and Ace Hood.

=== 2008–2016: Mixtape circuit ===
In late 2008 Shawty Lo started working on a new album entitled Carlos; artists that were to be featured on the album included Rick Ross, T-Pain, Lil' Kim, Bun B, Nate Butler, Lyfe Jennings, Mýa, T.I., Lil Wayne, and Gucci Mane. On December 8, 2008 Shawty Lo released a song from the album entitled "Supplier"; it featured vocals from Trey Songz and Lil Wayne.

On March 9, 2009, Shawty Lo released a song titled "Roll the Dice"; the song is known for marking the end of the feud between him and fellow Atlanta-based rapper T.I. On March 23, 2009, Shawty Lo announced that he had changed his second album's title from Carlos to I Am Carlos and its release date would be June 3, 2009. On April 27, 2010 Shawty Lo would release a new single, titled "Atlanta, GA", which featured vocals from Gucci Mane, Ludacris and The-Dream.

On June 10, 2011, during an interview, it was confirmed by both Shawty Lo and AllHipHop that he had signed a new label deal with G-Unit Records, after it was reported they were in talks. Shawty Lo said, "My new situation with G-Unit was just solidified and I got off the phone with 50 yesterday, I just signed a really large deal, as well as, It's like a new beginning and all I needed was someone behind me. 50 Cent is a marketing genius and I got my new thing D4L and G-Unit and we going to be working the south and the rest of the world if need be." It was later clarified by Shawty Lo that he had not signed as an artist but instead he had signed his label D4L Records to G-Unit South a subsidiary record label of G-Unit Records. On July 27, 2011, Shawty Lo would announce that he had changed his second album's title from I Am Carlos to Still Got Units.

On June 10, 2014, it was announced that Shawty Lo was working and prepping the release of his new mixtape entitled King of Bankhead, which was released on November 3, 2014.

== D4L Records ==
D4L Records
- Founded: 2003
- Founder: Carlos "Shawty Lo" Walker (CEO & President)
- Defunct: 2016
- Status: Defunct
- Distributors: Grown Money (current); G-Unit South (former)
- Genre: Hip hop, southern hip hop
- Country of origin: United States
- Location: Atlanta, Georgia (2003–2016)

D4L Records, is an Atlanta, Georgia-based record label founded in 2003, by Carlos "Shawty Lo" Walker. On June 22, 2011, it was announced that Shawty Lo had signed the label to a distribution deal with 50 Cent's subsidiary label G-Unit South, for a worth of over $10 million. On January 15, 2015, during an interview, Shawty Lo would announce that he had signed the label to a new label deal with Grown Money Entertainment. The label became defunct following Walker's death in September 2016.

== Controversies ==
=== Feud with T.I. ===
In 2008, Shawty Lo was involved in a highly publicized feud with another Atlanta rapper, T.I. The feud was characterized by Shawty Lo's track "Dunn Dunn", and T.I.'s reply "What Up, What's Haapnin". The song "Dunn Dunn" appears to question T.I.'s roots in Bankhead, Atlanta. The music video for "What Up, What's Haapnin" was shot in Bowen Homes, Shawty Lo's neighborhood. In an interview, T.I. insisted that his song "No Matter What" was only partially aimed at Shawty Lo. The feud reached its climax at the November 2008 Dirty Awards, where the entourages of both artists fought during the ceremony, forcing it to be shut down. Two incidents forced police to use pepper-spray and evacuate the audience. The feud was publicly ended on March 7, 2009, when Shawty Lo and T.I. appeared on-stage together at Club Crucial in Bankhead, for T.I.'s farewell concert. After this performance, T.I. gave an interview to MTV, in which he stated that the feud with Shawty Lo was exaggerated by the media, and was not a 'beef'. Shawty Lo also made a song titled "Roll the Dice", which samples Coldplay's popular 2008 single "Viva la Vida". "Roll the Dice" marked the end of the feud between Shawty Lo and T.I.

=== All My Babies' Mamas ===
His TV series, All My Babies' Mamas was set to air later in 2013 on the Oxygen channel. On January 15, 2013, Oxygen Media cancelled the show, stating in a press release that "as part of our development process, we have reviewed casting and decided not to move forward with the special." However, on February 26, 2013, Shawty Lo announced that there were other television networks that were interested in the reality show.

== Personal life ==
By the age of 17, Walker had fathered his first child. On June 16, 2011, Walker announced that he had diabetes. Walker had a total of 11 children: nine daughters and two sons from 10 women.

== Death and funeral ==
On September 21, 2016, Walker was killed in a single-vehicle accident in Fulton County, Georgia. The crash happened around 2:20 a.m. when Walker's 2016 Audi A7 went behind a guardrail, hit trees, and caught on fire; he was ejected from the vehicle and pronounced dead at the scene from accidental blunt force trauma to the head. Two female passengers in the vehicle experienced non-life-threatening injuries.

Walker's funeral was held on October 1, 2016, at Jackson Memorial Baptist Church in Atlanta. Following the service, the funeral procession proceeded to The Blue Flame Lounge, one of his favorite strip clubs, where a large group of patrons and mourners honored his casket with a moment of silence "filled with just the glow of the candles, and the lights from the strip club". Shawty Lo was buried at Forest Lawn Memorial Gardens in College Park, Georgia. Artists who paid tribute to Shawty Lo after his death include Gucci Mane, Lil Marlo, Beyoncé, Leslie Pace, Vince Staples, Future, Kendrick Lamar, Lil' Kim, 50 Cent, T.I., Dej Loaf, Joe Budden, DJ Drama, DJ Khaled, Jon Connor, Young Thug, Soulja Boy, Mack Maine, Tony Yayo, Young Scooter, Rick Ross, Raekwon, Kid Ink, CeeLo Green, Pastor Troy, ILoveMakonnen, Mistah F.A.B., Lil Durk, Latto, Jermaine Dupri and Girl Talk.

== Discography ==
- Units in the City (2008)
- Rico (2017)

== Awards and nominations ==
- BET Hip Hop Awards
  - 2008, Rookie of the Year [Won]
  - 2008, Track of the Year, "Dey Know" [Won]
- Ozone Awards
  - 2008, Best Rap Album, Units in the City [Nominated]
  - 2008, Breakthrough Artist [Won]
  - 2008, Club Banger of the Year, "Dey Know" [Nominated]
  - 2008, Best Mixtape/Street Album, "I'm Da Man 2" with DJ Scream [Nominated]
