= Gucci Mane discography =

Hip hop recording artist discography

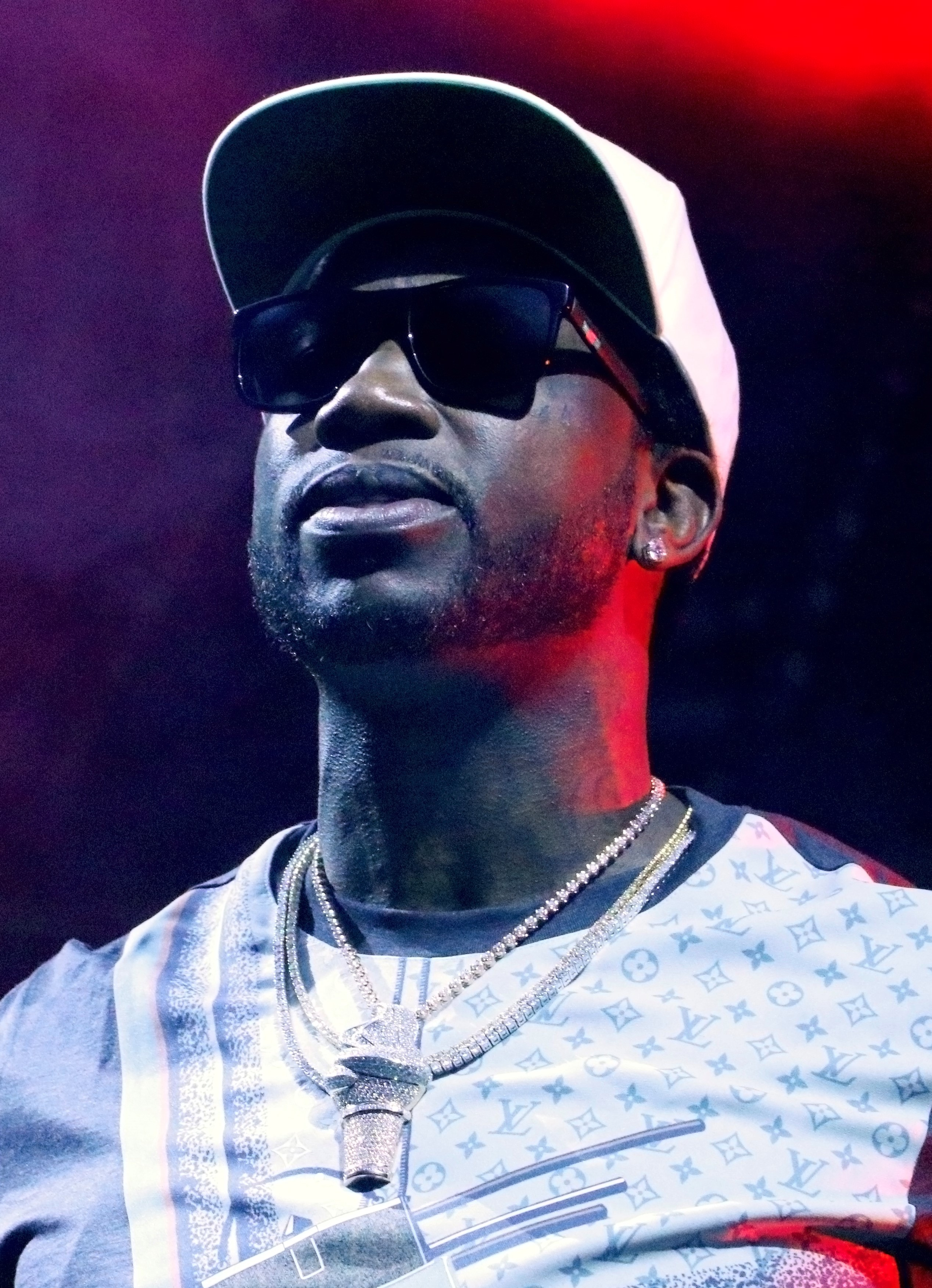
- Gucci Mane in 2017
- Studio albums: 17
- Extended plays: 8
- Soundtrack albums: 1
- Compilation albums: 14
- Singles: 100
- Collaboration albums: 3
- Mixtapes: 81
- Promotional singles: 10

American rapper Gucci Mane has released 17 studio albums, 3 collaborative albums, 14 compilation albums, one soundtrack, 8 extended plays (EPs), 81 mixtapes and 100 singles (including 52 as a featured artist) and 16 promotional singles. As of October 2026, he holds the record for largest discography by a hip hop artist.

His first album "La Flare" was released by Str8 Drop Records in 2001 (with it later being re-released to the public in 2010). His next three albums were released by Big Cat Records, under the aegis of Tommy Boy Records, while his subsequent major projects were released by Atlantic Records. His debut studio album, Trap House was released in 2005, and spawned 5 singles, including his debut single "Icy" (featuring fellow Atlanta rapper Jeezy). The album peaked at number 101 on the Billboard 200 and was followed up by Hard to Kill a year later. The album performed somewhat better with a peak of number 76, and contained his first song to chart on the Billboard Hot 100, "Freaky Gurl" (at number 62). A remix of the song featuring Lil' Kim and Ludacris was released in September 2007 and would be included on his next album Trap-A-Thon (2007).

Davis then established his own record label, So Icey Entertainment, which would eventually be rebranded as 1017 Records.

== Albums ==
=== Studio albums ===
List of studio albums, with selected chart positions, sales figures and certifications
Title	Album details	Peak chart positions										Certifications
Title	Album details	US	US R&B/HH	US Rap	US Ind.	AUS	BEL (FL)	BEL (WA)	CAN	NLD	UK	Certifications
Trap House	Released: May 24, 2005 (US); Label: Laflare, Big Cat, Tommy Boy; Formats: CD, digital download	101	20	10	5	—	—	—	—	—	—	
Hard to Kill	Released: October 24, 2006 (US); Label: Laflare, Big Cat, Tommy Boy; Formats: CD, digital download	76	13	6	4	—	—	—	—	—	—	
Trap-A-Thon	Released: September 25, 2007 (US); Label: Big Cat, Tommy Boy; Formats: CD, digital download	69	9	4	7	—	—	—	—	—	—	
Back to the Trap House	Released: December 11, 2007 (US); Label: So Icy, Czar, Asylum, Atlantic; Formats: CD, digital download	57	11	6	—	—	—	—	—	—	—	
Murder Was the Case	Released: May 5, 2009 (US); Label: Big Cat, Tommy Boy; Formats: CD, LP, digital download	23	3	4	3	—	—	—	—	—	—	
The State vs. Radric Davis	Released: December 8, 2009 (US); Label: 1017, Asylum, Warner Bros.; Formats: CD, digital download	10	2	1	—	—	—	—	—	—	—	RIAA: Platinum
The Appeal: Georgia's Most Wanted	Released: September 28, 2010 (US); Label: 1017, Asylum, Warner Bros.; Formats: CD, digital download	4	2	2	—	—	—	—	—	—	—	
The Return of Mr. Zone 6	Released: March 22, 2011 (US); Label: 1017, Warner Bros.; Formats: CD, digital download	18	8	2	—	—	—	—	—	—	—	
Everybody Looking	Released: July 22, 2016 (US); Label: GUWOP, Atlantic; Formats: CD, LP, digital download, streaming	2	1	1	—	—	145	166	11	65	110	RIAA: Gold
The Return of East Atlanta Santa	Released: December 16, 2016 (US); Label: GUWOP, Atlantic; Formats: Digital download	16	7	6	—	—	—	—	44	—	—	RIAA: Gold
Mr. Davis	Released: October 13, 2017; Label: GUWOP, Atlantic; Formats: CD, LP, digital download, streaming	2	1	1	—	49	93	148	5	41	77	RIAA: Platinum
Evil Genius	Released: December 7, 2018; Label: GUWOP, Atlantic; Formats: CD, digital download, streaming	5	3	3	—	—	142	—	15	49	—	RIAA: Platinum
Delusions of Grandeur	Released: June 21, 2019; Label: GUWOP, Atlantic; Formats: digital download, streaming	7	3	2	—	82	—	—	18	60	—	
Woptober II	Released: October 18, 2019; Label: GUWOP, Atlantic; Formats: CD, digital download, streaming	9	7	6	—	—	—	—	28	—	—	
Ice Daddy	Released: June 18, 2021; Label: 1017, Atlantic; Formats: digital download, streaming	34	18	14	—	—	—	—	—	—	—	
Breath of Fresh Air	Released: October 17, 2023; Label: 1017, Atlantic; Format: CD, LP, digital download, streaming	141	—	—	—	—	—	—	—	—	—	
Episodes	Released: October 17, 2025; Label: 1017, Atlantic; Format: CD, LP, digital download, streaming	195	—	—	—	—	—	—	—	—	—	
Against All Odds	Released: October 16, 2026; Label: 1017, Atlantic; Format: CD, LP, digital download, streaming	—	—	—	—	—	—	—	—	—	—	
"—" denotes a recording that did not chart or was not released in that territory.

=== Compilation albums ===
List of compilation albums, with selected chart positions
Title	Album details	Peak chart positions				Certifications
Title	Album details	US	US R&B/HH	US Rap	US Ind.	Certifications
Hood Classics	Released: September 23, 2008 (US); Label: Tommy Boy; Formats: CD, digital download	197	16	9	31	
Greatest Mixtape Hits	Released: January 8, 2016; Label: 1017, RBC; Formats: Digital download	—	—	—	—	
Meal Ticket	Released: April 29, 2016 (US); Label: 1017, RBC; Formats: Digital download	—	—	—	—	
Tru Colors (with Migos, Young Thug and Peewee Longway)	Released: May 13, 2016 (US); Label: 1017, RBC; Formats: Digital download	—	—	—	—	
Free Gucci: The Release (Vol.1)	Released: May 27, 2016 (US); Label: 1017, RBC; Formats: Digital download	—	—	—	—	
Free Gucci: The Release (Vol.2)	Released: May 27, 2016 (US); Label: 1017, RBC; Formats: Digital download	—	—	—	—	
So Icy Summer (with 1017)	Released: July 3, 2020; Label: GUWOP, Atlantic; Formats: Digital download, streaming	29	19	19	—	RIAA: Gold
So Icy Gang Vol. 1 (with 1017)	Released: October 16, 2020; Label: 1017, Atlantic; Formats: Digital download, streaming	46	26	25	—	RIAA: Gold
Trap God Classics: I Am My Only Competition	Released: November 19, 2020; Label: 1017, Atlantic; Formats: Digital download, streaming	—	—	—	—	
So Icy Boyz (with 1017)	Released: October 15, 2021; Label: 1017, Atlantic; Formats: Digital download, streaming	42	22	21	—	
So Icy Christmas (with 1017)	Released: December 17, 2021; Label: 1017, Atlantic; Formats: Digital download, streaming	—	—	—	—	
So Icy Gang: The ReUp (with 1017)	Released: June 17, 2022; Label: 1017, Atlantic; Formats: Digital download, streaming	39	19	14	—	
So Icy Boyz 22 (with 1017)	Released: October 17, 2022; Label: 1017, Atlantic; Formats: Digital download, streaming	—	—	—	—	
So Icy Boyz: The Finale (with 1017)	Released: December 9, 2022; Label: 1017, Atlantic; Formats: Digital download, streaming	—	—	—	—	*RIAA: Gold
"—" denotes a recording that did not chart or was not released in that territory.

=== Collaborative albums ===
List of collaborative albums, with selected chart positions
Title	Album details	Peak chart positions			Sales
Title	Album details	US	US R&B/HH	US Rap	Sales
Ferrari Boyz (with Waka Flocka Flame)	Released: August 9, 2011 (US); Label: 1017, Brick Squad Monopoly, Asylum, Warner Bros.; Formats: CD, digital download	20	5	4	
BAYTL (with V-Nasty)	Released: December 13, 2011 (US); Label: 1017, Asylum, Warner Bros.; Formats: CD, digital download	198	29	16	US: 5,000

=== Soundtrack albums ===
List of soundtracks
Title	Album details
The Spot: The Soundtrack	Released: October 30, 2015; Label: 1017; Format: Digital download

== Extended plays ==
List of extended plays, with selected chart positions
Title	Details
Wasted: The Prequel	Released: September 4, 2009 (US); Label: 1017, Asylum, Warner Bros.; Formats: CD, digital download
Views from Zone 6	Released: February 18, 2015; Label: 1017; Format: Digital download
Dessert	Released: March 24, 2015; Label: 1017; Format: Digital download
GucTiggy (with Zaytoven)	Released: August 22, 2016; Label: 1017; Format: Digital download
Free Bricks 2: Zone 6 Edition (with Future)	Released: November 14, 2016; Label: Self-released; Format: Digital download
1017 vs. The World (with Lil Uzi Vert)	Released: November 23, 2016; Label: Generation Now, GUWOP; Format: Digital download
3 for Free	Released: January 25, 2017; Label: Self-released; Format: Digital download
1017 Up Next	Released: April 5, 2023; Label: 1017, Atlantic; Format: Digital download

== Mixtapes ==
List of mixtapes, with selected chart positions
Title	Album details	Peak chart positions			
Title	Album details	US	US Ind.	US R&B/HH	US Rap
La Flare	Released: 2001 (US); Label: Str8 Drop Records; Formats: CD, digital download	—	—	—	—
Chicken Talk	Released: October 11, 2006 (US); Label: Laflare. So Icy Ent.; Format: Digital download	—	—	—	—
Ice Attack	Released: February 26, 2007 (US); Label: So Icy Ent. Atlantic; Format: Digital download	—	—	—	—
Ice Attack 2	Released: June 20, 2007 (US); Label: So Icy Ent. Atlantic; Format: Digital download	—	—	—	—
Bird Flu (Southern Slang)	Released: September 11, 2007 (US); Label: So Icy Ent.; Format: Digital download	—	—	—	—
No Pad, No Pencil	Released: November 13, 2007 (US); Label: So Icy Ent. Atlantic; Formats: CD, digital download	—	—	86	—
Guapaholics (with Shawty Lo)	Released: December 8, 2007 (US); Label: So Icy Ent.; Format: Digital download	—	—	—	—
Trap Tacular	Released: February 9, 2008 (US); Label: So Icy Ent.; Format: Digital download	—	—	—	—
EA Sportscenter	Released: May 1, 2008 (US); Label: So Icy Ent.; Format: Digital download	—	—	—	—
Mr. Perfect	Released: May 22, 2008 (US); Label: So Icy Ent.; Format: Digital download	—	—	—	—
Gucci Sosa	Released: August 17, 2008 (US); Label: So Icy Ent.; Format: Digital download	—	—	—	—
Definition of a G (with Yo Gotti)	Released: August 19, 2008 (US); Label: So Icy Ent.; Format: Digital download	—	—	—	—
From Zone 6 to Duval	Released: August 27, 2008 (US); Label: So Icy Ent.; Format: Digital download	—	—	—	—
The Movie	Released: September 16, 2008 (US); Label: So Icy Ent.; Format: Digital download	—	—	—	—
Exclusive	Released: December 10, 2008 (US); Label: So Icy Ent.; Format: Digital download	—	—	—	—
Bird Flu: Part 2	Released: January 17, 2009 (US); Label: So Icy Ent.; Format: Digital download	—	—	—	—
Bird Money	Released: March 17, 2009 (US); Label: Tommy Boy; Formats: CD, digital download	172	27	27	8
Writing on the Wall	Released: May 15, 2009 (US); Label: So Icy Ent.; Formats: CD, digital download	—	—	—	—
The Movie: Part 2 (The Sequel)	Released: July 22, 2009 (US); Label: So Icy Ent.; Format: Digital download	—	—	—	—
The Burrprint (The Movie 3D)	Released: October 10, 2009 (US); Label: So Icy Ent.; Format: Digital download	—	36	—	18
The Cold War: Part 1 (Guccimerica)	Released: October 17, 2009 (US); Label: So Icy Ent.; Format: Digital download	—	—	—	—
The Cold War: Part 2 (Great Brrritain)	Released: October 17, 2009 (US); Label: So Icy Ent.; Format: Digital download	—	—	—	—
The Cold War: Part 3 (Brrrussia)	Released: October 17, 2009 (US); Label: So Icy Ent.; Format: Digital download	—	—	—	—
Burrrprint (2) HD	Released: March 13, 2010 (US); Label: 1017 Brick Squad, Warner Bros.; Format: CD, digital download	19	—	6	2
Mr. Zone 6	Released: June 19, 2010 (US); Label: 1017 Brick Squad; Format: Digital download	—	—	—	—
Jewelry Selection	Released: August 17, 2010 (US); Label: 1017 Brick Squad; Format: Digital download	—	—	—	—
Ferrari Music	Released: September 9, 2010 (US); Label: 1017 Brick Squad; Format: Digital download	—	—	—	—
Buy My Album	Released: September 23, 2010 (US); Label: 1017 Brick Squad; Format: Digital download	—	—	—	—
Gucci 2 Time	Released: January 14, 2011 (US); Label: 1017 Brick Squad; Format: Download	—	—	—	—
Bricksquad Mafia (with 1017 Brick Squad)	Released: February 5, 2011 (US); Label: 1017 Brick Squad; Format: Digital download	—	—	—	—
Writings on the Wall 2	Released: July 5, 2011 (US); Label: 1017 Brick Squad; Format: Digital download	—	—	—	—
Free Bricks (with Future)	Released: July 29, 2011 (US); Label: 1017 Brick Squad; Formats: CD, digital download	—	—	—	—
Trap Back	Released: February 5, 2012 (US); Label: 1017 Brick Squad; Formats: Digital download, CD-R	—	—	—	—
I'm Up	Released: May 25, 2012 (US); Label: 1017 Brick Squad; Formats: CD, digital download	—	—	—	—
Trap God	Released: October 17, 2012 (US); Label: 1017 Brick Squad; Format: Digital download	—	—	33	25
Trap God 2	Released: February 12, 2013 (US); Label: 1017 Brick Squad; Format: Digital download	182	29	34	20
Free Bricks 2 (with Young Scooter)	Released: February 28, 2013 (US); Label: 1017 Brick Squad; Format: Digital download	—	—	—	—
EastAtlantaMemphis (with Young Dolph)	Released: March 15, 2013 (US); Label: 1017 Brick Squad; Format: Digital download	—	—	—	—
Trap Back 2	Released: March 15, 2013 (US); Label: 1017 Brick Squad; Format: Digital download	—	—	—	—
Money, Pounds, Ammunition (with Peewee Longway)	Released: March 22, 2013 (US); Label: 1017 Brick Squad; Format: Digital download	—	—	—	—
Trap House III	Released: May 21, 2013; Label: 1017 Records, 101 Distribution; Formats: Digital download	88	9	16	16
World War 3: Molly (with Metro Boomin, Sonny Digital and Dun Deal)	Released: August 13, 2013; Label: 1017 Records; Format: Digital download	—	—	45	—
World War 3: Gas (with 808 Mafia)	Released: August 13, 2013; Label: 1017 Records; Format: Digital download	—	46	32	18
World War 3: Lean (with Zaytoven, Honorable C.N.O.T.E., Mike Will Made It)	Released: August 13, 2013; Label: 1017 Records; Format: Digital download	—	47	33	19
Diary of a Trap God	Released: September 11, 2013; Label: 1017 Records; Format: Digital download	—	—	—	—
Trust God Fuck 12 (with Rich Homie Quan)	Released: October 17, 2013; Label: 1017 Records, 101 Distribution; Format: Digital download	—	—	—	—
The State vs. Radric Davis II: The Caged Bird Sings	Released: December 25, 2013; Label: 1017 Records, 101 Distribution; Formats: Digital download	—	31	—	38
Young Thugga Mane La Flare (with Young Thug)	Released: April 20, 2014; Label: 1017 Records, 101 Distribution; Format: Digital download	—	—	—	—
Brick Factory Vol. 1	Released: May 26, 2014; Label: 1017 Records, 101 Distribution; Format: Digital download	—	—	39	22
World War 3D: The Green Album (with Migos)	Released: June 16, 2014; Label: 1017 Records, 101 Distribution; Format: Digital download	—	—	—	—
World War 3D: The Purple Album (with Young Thug)	Released: June 16, 2014; Label: 1017 Records, 101 Distribution; Format: Digital download	—	—	—	—
World War 3D: The White Album (with Peewee Longway)	Released: June 16, 2014; Label: 1017 Records, 101 Distribution; Format: Digital download	—	—	—	—
Trap House 4	Released: July 4, 2014; Label: 1017 Records, 101 Distribution; Format: Digital download	153	27	15	23
Felix Brothers (with Young Dolph & Peewee Longway as Felix Brothers)	Released: July 17, 2014; Label: 1017 Records, 101 Distribution; Format: Digital download	—	—	—	
The Oddfather	Released: July 28, 2014; Label: 1017 Records, 101 Distribution; Format: Digital download	—	36	29	15
Gucci vs. Guwop	Released: August 15, 2014; Label: 1017 Records, 101 Distribution; Format: Digital download	—	—	—	—
Brick Factory Vol. 2	Released: September 3, 2014; Label: 1017 Records, 101 Distribution; Format: Digital download	—	—	—	—
The Return of Mr. Perfect	Released: September 13, 2014; Label: 1017 Records; Format: Digital download	—	—	—	—
Trap God 3	Released: October 17, 2014; Label: 1017 Records, 101 Distribution; Format: Digital download	88	19	16	9
Big Gucci Sosa (with Chief Keef)	Released: October 30, 2014; Label: 1017 Records, Glo Gang, 101 Distribution; Format: Digital download	—	—	—	—
East Atlanta Santa	Released: December 25, 2014; Label: 1017 Records, 101 Distribution; Format: Digital download	—	—	—	—
C.N.O.T.E. Vs. Gucci (with Honorable C.N.O.T.E.)	Released: December 25, 2014; Label: 1017 Records, Honorable Court; Format: Digital download	—	—	—	—
1017 Mafia: Incarcerated	Released: January 3, 2015; Label: 1017 Records, 101 Distribution; Format: Digital download	—	40	47	—
Brick Factory 3	Released: February 12, 2015; Label: 1017 Records, 101 Distribution; Format: Digital download	—	—	—	—
Mr. Clean, The Middle Man	Released: March 4, 2015; Label: 1017 Records; Format: Digital download	—	—	—	—
Breakfast	Released: March 17, 2015 (US); Label: 1017 Records, 101 Distribution; Format: Digital download	—	—	—	—
Lunch	Released: March 17, 2015 (US); Label: 1017 Records, 101 Distribution; Format: Digital download	—	—	—	—
Dinner	Released: March 17, 2015 (US); Label: 1017 Records, 101 Distribution; Format: Digital download	—	—	—	—
Trap House 5 (The Final Chapter)	Released: May 1, 2015; Label: 1017 Records, 101 Distribution; Format: Digital download	—	—	—	—
King Gucci	Released: May 20, 2015 (US); Label: 1017 Records; Format: Digital download	—	—	—	—
Trapology	Released: July 1, 2015 (US); Label: 1017 Records; Format: Digital download	—	—	—	—
East Atlanta Santa 2: The Night GuWop Stole X-Mas	Released: December 25, 2015 (US); Label: 1017 Records; Format: Digital download	—	—	—	—
Mamas Basement (with Zaytoven)	Released: January 27, 2016 (US); Label: 1017 Brick Squad; Formats: LP, digital download	—	—	—	—
C-Note vs. Gucci 2 (with Honorable C-Note)	Released: February 19, 2016; Labels: 1017 Brick Squad, Honorable Court; Format: Digital download	—	—	—	—
Woptober	Released: October 14, 2016 (US); Labels: GUWOP Enterprises, Atlantic; Format: Digital download, streaming	43	—	—	—
Droptopwop (with Metro Boomin)	Released: May 26, 2017 (US); Labels: GUWOP Enterprises, Atlantic; Format: Digital download, streaming	12	—	7	5
Ralo LaFlare (with Ralo)	Released: July 6, 2017 (US); Labels: GUWOP Enterprises, Famerica, Atlantic; Format: Digital download, streaming	—	—	—	—
El Gato: The Human Glacier	Released: December 22, 2017; Label: GUWOP, Atlantic; Formats: Digital download, streaming	28	—	11	9
East Atlanta Santa 3	Released: December 20, 2019; Label: GUWOP, Atlantic; Formats: Digital download, streaming	68	—	27	19
Choppers & Bricks (with B.G.)	Released: December 15, 2023; Label: Global Music, LLC and Atlantic; Format: Digital download	—	—	—	—
Greatest of All Trappers (Gangsta Grillz Edition)	Released: August 16, 2024; Label: Global Music, LLC and Atlantic; Format: Digital download	—	—	—	—
"—" denotes a recording that did not chart.

== Singles ==
=== As lead artist ===
List of singles as lead artist, with selected chart positions and certifications, showing year released and album name
Title	Year	Peak chart positions										Certifications	Album
Title	Year	US	US R&B /HH	US Rap	US Main. R&B/HH	US Rhy.	US R&B/HH Air.	US Rap Air.	AUS	CAN	UK	Certifications	Album
"Icy" (featuring Young Jeezy and Boo)	2005	— (Note: "Icy" did not enter the Billboard Hot 100, but peaked at number five on the Bubbling Under Hot 100 Singles chart.)	46	23	23	37	42	23	—	—	—		Trap House
"Go Head" (featuring Mac Bre-Z)	2006	—	51	—	—	—	51	—	—	—	—		Trap House
"Bird Flu"	2007	—	—	—	—	—	—	—	—	—	—		Back to the Trap House
"Freaky Gurl"	2007	62	19	12	14	20	19	12	—	—	—	RIAA: Gold	Hard to Kill
"Stoopid"	2008	—	66	—	—	—	66	—	—	—	—		Murder Was the Case
"Wasted" (featuring Plies or OJ Da Juiceman)	2009	36	3	3	1	24	3	3	—	—	—	RIAA: Platinum	The State vs. Radric Davis
"Spotlight" (featuring Usher)	2009	42	15	8	10	18	15	8	—	—	46	RIAA: Platinum	The State vs. Radric Davis
"Lemonade"	2009	53	15	8	9	21	15	8	—	—	—	RIAA: 2× Platinum	The State vs. Radric Davis
"Bingo" (featuring Soulja Boy and Waka Flocka Flame)	2010	—	75	—	—	—	75	—	—	—	—		The State vs. Radric Davis
"Gucci Time" (featuring Swizz Beatz)	2010	— (Note: "Gucci Time" did not enter the Billboard Hot 100, but peaked at number four on the Bubbling Under Hot 100 Singles chart.)	23	12	20	—	23	12	—	—	—		The Appeal: Georgia's Most Wanted
"She Be Puttin' On" (with Waka Flocka Flame featuring Slim Dunkin)	2011	—	77	—	—	—	—	—	—	—	—		Ferrari Boyz
"Whip Appeal" (with V-Nasty featuring P2theLA)	2011	—	—	—	—	—	—	—	—	—	—		BAYTL
"Nuthin' on Ya" (featuring Wiz Khalifa)	2013	—	—	—	—	—	—	—	—	—	—		Trap God 2 and Trap House III
"Breakfast" (featuring Waka Flocka Flame and Peewee Longway)	2013	—	—	—	—	—	—	—	—	—	—		Trap God 2 and Money, Pounds, Ammunition
"Trap House III" (featuring Rick Ross)	2013	—	—	—	—	—	—	—	—	—	—		Trap House III
"Use Me" (featuring 2 Chainz)	2013	—	—	—	—	—	—	—	—	—	—		Trap House III
"Darker" (featuring Chief Keef)	2013	—	—	—	—	—	—	—	—	—	—		Trap House III and Big Gucci Sosa
"#MentionMe"	2013	—	—	—	—	—	—	—	—	—	—		The State vs. Radric Davis II: The Caged Bird Sings
"Say a Prayer" (featuring Rich Homie Quan)	2014	—	—	—	—	—	—	—	—	—	—		Brick Factory: Volume 1
"Time to Get Paid" (featuring Peewee Longway)	2014	—	—	—	—	—	—	—	—	—	—		World War 3D: The White Album
"Panoramic Roof" (featuring Young Thug)	2014	—	—	—	—	—	—	—	—	—	—		World War 3D: The Purple Album
"Top in the Trash" (with Chief Keef)	2014	—	—	—	—	—	—	—	—	—	—		Big Gucci Sosa and Trap House 4
"Shit Wouldnt Happen"	2014	—	—	—	—	—	—	—	—	—	—		Trap God 3
"Speed Bumps"	2014	—	—	—	—	—	—	—	—	—	—		Trap God 3
"Down on That" (featuring Young Thug)	2015	—	—	—	—	—	—	—	—	—	—		Brick Factory: Volume 3
"Make Yo Move" (featuring Quavo)	2015	—	—	—	—	—	—	—	—	—	—		Views from Zone 6 and Lunch
"Still Selling Dope" (featuring Fetty Wap or remix featuring Lil Reese)	2015	—	—	—	—	—	—	—	—	—	—		King Gucci
"Parking Lot" (featuring Snoop Dogg)	2015	—	—	—	—	—	—	—	—	—	—		Trapology
"Orange"	2015	—	—	—	—	—	—	—	—	—	—		The Spot Soundtrack
"1st Day Out tha Feds"	2016	— (Note: "1st Day Out Tha Feds" did not enter the Billboard Hot 100, but peaked at number eight on the Bubbling Under Hot 100 Singles chart.)	42	—	—	—	—	—	—	—	—	RIAA: Gold	Everybody Looking
"Back on Road" (featuring Drake)	2016	81	28	22	—	—	—	—	—	—	—	RIAA: Gold	Everybody Looking
"On Me" (featuring 2Pac)	2016	—	—	—	—	—	—	—	—	—	—		Non-album singles
"Champions" (with Kanye West, Big Sean, 2 Chainz, Travis Scott, Yo Gotti, Quavo and Desiigner)	2016	71	22	15	—	—	—	—	—	73	128	RIAA: Platinum; BPI: Silver	Non-album singles
"All My Children"	2016	—	—	—	—	—	—	—	—	—	—		Everybody Looking
"Guwop Home" (featuring Young Thug)	2016	— (Note: "Guwop Home" did not enter the Billboard Hot 100, but peaked at number 23 on the Bubbling Under Hot 100 Singles chart.)	— (Note: "Guwop Home" did not enter the Hot R&B/Hip-Hop Songs chart, but peaked at number one on the Bubbling Under R&B/Hip-Hop Singles chart.)	—	—	—	—	—	—	—	—		Everybody Looking
"No Sleep (Intro)"	2016	—	— (Note: "No Sleep (Intro)" did not enter the Billboard Hot R&B/Hip-Hop Songs chart, but peaked at number four on the Bubbling Under R&B/Hip-Hop Singles chart.)	—	—	—	—	—	—	—	—		Everybody Looking
"WayBach"	2016	—	— (Note: "WayBach" did not enter the Billboard Hot R&B/Hip-Hop Songs chart, but peaked at number eight on the Bubbling Under R&B/Hip-Hop Singles chart.)	—	—	—	—	—	—	—	—		Everybody Looking
"Bling Blaww Burr" (featuring Young Dolph)	2016	—	— (Note: "Bling Blaww Burr" did not enter the Billboard Hot R&B/Hip-Hop Songs chart, but peaked at number ten on the Bubbling Under R&B/Hip-Hop Singles chart.)	—	—	—	—	—	—	—	—		Woptober
"Last Time" (featuring Travis Scott)	2016	—	— (Note: "Last Time" did not enter the Hot R&B/Hip-Hop Songs chart, but peaked at number 48 on the Hot R&B/Hip-Hop Airplay chart.)	—	30	—	48	—	—	—	—	RIAA: Gold	The Return of East Atlanta Santa
"Drove U Crazy" (featuring Bryson Tiller)	2016	— (Note: "Drove U Crazy" did not enter the Billboard Hot 100, but peaked at number ten on the Bubbling Under Hot 100 Singles chart.)	— (Note: "Drove U Crazy" did not enter the Hot R&B/Hip-Hop Songs chart, but peaked at number four on the Bubbling Under R&B/Hip-Hop Singles chart.)	—	—	—	—	—	—	—	—		The Return of East Atlanta Santa
"Both" (featuring Drake)	2017	41	16	11	1	10	1	1	—	43	—	RIAA: 4× Platinum; BPI: Silver	The Return of East Atlanta Santa
"Make Love" (with Nicki Minaj)	2017	78	33	22	—	—	—	—	—	—	—	RIAA: Gold	Mr. Davis
"Tone It Down" (featuring Chris Brown)	2017	— (Note: "Tone It Down" did not enter the Billboard Hot 100, but peaked at number 16 on the Bubbling Under Hot 100 Singles chart.)	— (Note: "Tone It Down" did not enter the Billboard Hot R&B/Hip-Hop Songs chart, but peaked at number four on the Bubbling Under R&B/Hip-Hop Singles chart.)	—	17	—	24	20	—	—	—	RIAA: Gold	Mr. Davis
"I Get the Bag" (featuring Migos)	2017	11	5	5	1	1	3	3	—	28	—	RIAA: 8× Platinum; BPI: Silver	Mr. Davis
"Boom" (with Tiësto and Sevenn)	2018	—	—	—	—	—	—	—	—	—	—		Non-album single
"Cocky" (with ASAP Rocky and 21 Savage)	2018	— (Note: "Cocky" did not enter the Billboard Hot 100, but peaked at number 17 on the Bubbling Under Hot 100 Singles chart.)	—	—	—	—	—	—	—	83	—		The Uncle Drew Motion Picture Soundtrack
"Solitaire" (featuring Migos and Lil Yachty)	2018	— (Note: "Solitaire" did not enter the Billboard Hot 100, but peaked at number eight on the Bubbling Under Hot 100 Singles chart.)	—	—	26	—	41	—	—	—	—		Evil Genius
"Kept Back" (featuring Lil Pump)	2018	—	—	—	—	—	—	—	—	—	—		Evil Genius
"Wake Up in the Sky" (with Bruno Mars and Kodak Black)	2018	11	5	5	2	1	5	2	46	36	65	RIAA: 6× Platinum; BPI: Gold	Evil Genius
"Shoebox" (with Hoodrich Pablo Juan featuring Nav)	2019	—	—	—	—	—	—	—	—	—	—		BLO: The Movie
"Love Thru the Computer" (featuring Justin Bieber)	2019	—	—	—	—	—	—	—	—	—	—		Delusions of Grandeur
"Backwards" (featuring Meek Mill)	2019	—	—	—	—	—	—	—	—	—	—		Delusions of Grandeur
"Proud of You"	2019	—	—	—	—	—	—	—	—	—	—		Delusions of Grandeur
"Richer Than Errybody" (featuring YoungBoy Never Broke Again and DaBaby)	2019	—	—	—	—	—	—	—	—	—	—		Woptober II
"Big Booty" (featuring Megan Thee Stallion)	2019	— (Note: "Big Booty" did not enter the Billboard Hot 100, but peaked at number four on the Bubbling Under Hot 100 chart.)	—	—	26	24	29	17	—	—	—	RIAA: Platinum	Woptober II
"Tootsies" (featuring Lil Baby)	2019	—	—	—	—	—	—	—	—	—	—		Woptober II
"Jingle Bales Intro"	2019	—	—	—	—	—	—	—	—	—	—		East Atlanta Santa 3
"She Miss Me" (featuring Rich the Kid)	2019	—	—	—	—	—	—	—	—	—	—		East Atlanta Santa 3
"Both Sides" (featuring Lil Baby)	2020	—	—	—	—	—	—	—	—	—	—		So Icy Summer
"Still Remember" (featuring Pooh Shiesty)	2020	—	—	—	—	—	—	—	—	—	—		So Icy Summer
"Who Is Him" (featuring Pooh Shiesty)	2020	—	—	—	—	—	—	—	—	—	—		So Icy Summer
"Meeting" (featuring Foogiano and Latto)	2020	—	—	—	—	—	—	—	—	—	—		So Icy Gang, Vol. 1
"You a Dime" (with DJ Chose)	2021	—	—	—	—	—	—	—	—	—	—		Non-album single
"Shit Crazy" (featuring Big30)	2021	— (Note: "Shit Crazy" did not enter the Billboard Hot 100, but peaked at number six on the Bubbling Under Hot 100 chart.)	—	—	—	—	—	—	—	—	—	RIAA: Gold	Ice Daddy
"Poppin" (with BigWalkDog)	2021	—	—	—	—	—	—	—	—	—	—	RIAA: Gold	Ice Daddy
"Like 34 & 8" (featuring Pooh Shiesty)	2021	—	—	—	—	—	—	—	—	—	—		Ice Daddy
"Rumors" (featuring Lil Durk)	2022	51	11	6	13	23	16	15	—	70	—	RIAA: Platinum	So Icy Gang: The ReUp
"Publicity Stunt"	2022	72	22	—	—	—	—	—	—	—	—		So Icy Gang: The ReUp
"Blood All on It" (featuring Key Glock and Young Dolph)	2022	98	32	—	—	—	—	—	—	—	—		So Icy Gang: The ReUp
"Serial Killers"	2022	— (Note: "Serial Killers" did not enter the Billboard Hot 100, but peaked at number five on the Bubbling Under Hot 100 Singles chart.)	37	—	—	—	—	—	—	—	—		So Icy Gang: The ReUp
"Mrs. Davis"	2022	—	—	—	—	—	—	—	—	—	—		So Icy Gang: The ReUp
"All Dz Chainz" (featuring Lil Baby)	2022	— (Note: "All Dz Chainz" did not enter the Billboard Hot 100, but peaked at number 19 on the Bubbling Under Hot 100 Singles chart.)	42	—	—	—	—	—	—	—	—		So Icy Boyz 22
"Dissin the Dead"	2022	—	—	—	—	—	—	—	—	—	—		So Icy Boyz 22
"Us vs. Them" (with Quavo and Takeoff)	2022	—	—	—	—	—	—	—	—	—	—		Only Built for Infinity Links
"King Snipe" (with Kodak Black)	2023	100	39	19	—	—	—	—	—	—	—		Breath of Fresh Air
"06 Gucci" (featuring DaBaby and 21 Savage)	2023	— (Note: "06 Gucci" did not enter the Billboard Hot 100, but peaked at number 21 on the Bubbling Under Hot 100 Singles chart.)	42	—	—	—	—	—	—	—	—		Breath of Fresh Air
"Pissy" (featuring Roddy Ricch and Nardo Wick)	2023	— (Note: "Pissy" did not enter the Billboard Hot 100, but peaked at number 15 on the Bubbling Under Hot 100 Singles chart.)	37	24	—	—	—	—	—	—			Breath of Fresh Air
"Bluffin" (featuring Lil Baby)	2023	100	40	—	28	—	—	—	—	—			Breath of Fresh Air
"Married with Millions"	2023	—	—	—	—	—	—	—	—	—	—		Breath of Fresh Air
"Woppenheimer"	2023	—	—	—	—	—	—	—	—	—	—		Breath of Fresh Air
"Now It's Real"	2023	—	—	—	—	—	—	—	—	—	—		Breath of Fresh Air
"Broken Hearted"	2023	—	—	—	—	—	—	—	—	—	—		Breath of Fresh Air
"There I Go" (featuring J. Cole and Mike Will Made It)	2023	94	27	22	37	38	—	—	—	—	—		Breath of Fresh Air
"Cold" (featuring B.G. and Mike Will Made It)	2023	—	—	—	—	—	—	—	—	—	—		Choppers & Bricks
"TakeDat"	2024	—	—	—	—	—	—	—	—	—	—		Greatest of All Trappers (Gangsta Grillz Edition)
"Chanel Bag" (featuring JT)	2024	—	—	—	—	—	—	—	—	—	—		Greatest of All Trappers (Gangsta Grillz Edition)
"You Don't Love Me" (with Sexyy Red)	2024	—	—	—	—	—	—	—	—	—	—		Episodes
"Preference"	2025	—	—	—	—	—	—	—	—	—	—		Episodes
"Voices"	2025	—	—	—	—	—	—	—	—	—	—		Episodes
"Psycho"	2025	—	—	—	—	—	—	—	—	—	—		Episodes
"I Need You"	2025	—	—	—	—	—	—	—	—	—	—		Episodes
"Crash Dummy"	2026	—	41	—	—	—	—	—	—	—	—		Against All Odds
"—" denotes a recording that did not chart or was not released in that territory.

=== As featured artist ===
List of singles as featured artist, with selected chart positions and certifications, showing year released and album name
Title	Year	Peak chart positions										Certifications	Album
Title	Year	US	US R&B /HH	US Rap	AUS	BEL (FL)	CAN	FRA	NLD	NZ	UK	Certifications	Album
"Gucci Bandana" (Soulja Boy featuring Gucci Mane and Shawty Lo)	2008	—	89	—	—	—	—	—	—	—	—		iSouljaBoyTellem
"Make tha Trap Say Aye" (OJ da Juiceman featuring Gucci Mane)	2008	— (Note: "Make tha Trap Say Aye" did not enter the Billboard Hot 100, but peaked at number 8 on the Bubbling Under Hot 100 Singles chart.)	22	13	—	—	—	—	—	—	—		The Otha Side of the Trap
"Ridiculous" (DJ Drama featuring Gucci Mane, Yo Gotti, Lonnie Mac and OJ da Juiceman)	2009	—	— (Note: "Ridiculous" did not enter the Hot R&B/Hip-Hop Songs chart, but peaked at number four on the Bubbling Under R&B/Hip-Hop Singles chart.)	—	—	—	—	—	—	—	—		Gangsta Grillz: The Album (Vol. 2)
"Break Up" (Mario featuring Gucci Mane and Sean Garrett)	2009	14	2	—	—	—	—	—	—	—	—	RIAA: Platinum	D.N.A.
"30 Inches" (Juicy J featuring Gucci Mane and Project Pat)	2009	—	—	—	—	—	—	—	—	—	—		Hustle Till I Die
"Boi!" (Mike Jones and Young Problemz featuring Gucci Mane)	2009	—	74	—	—	—	—	—	—	—	—		The Voice
"Self Made" (K. Michelle featuring Gucci Mane and Trina)	2009	—	89	—	—	—	—	—	—	—	—		What's the 901?
"LOL :-)" (Trey Songz featuring Gucci Mane and Soulja Boy)	2009	51	12	—	—	—	—	—	—	—	—		Ready
"I Get It In" (Omarion featuring Gucci Mane)	2009	83	20	—	—	—	—	—	—	—	—		Ollusion
"Speak French" (Jamie Foxx featuring Gucci Mane)	2009	—	90	—	—	—	—	—	—	—	—		Best Night of My Life
"Pretty Girls" (Wale featuring Gucci Mane and Weensey)	2009	—	56	—	—	—	—	—	—	—	—		Attention Deficit
"Tip of My Tongue" (Jagged Edge featuring Trina and Gucci Mane)	2009	—	51	—	—	—	—	—	—	—	—		Non-album singles
"Krazy" (Game featuring Gucci Mane and Timbaland)	2009	—	—	—	—	—	—	—	—	—	—		Non-album singles
"Obsessed" (Remix) (Mariah Carey featuring Gucci Mane)	2009	—	—	—	—	—	—	—	—	—	—		Memoirs of an Imperfect Angel
"Steady Mobbin" (Young Money featuring Gucci Mane)	2010	48	17	6	—	—	—	—	—	—	—	RIAA: 2× Platinum	We Are Young Money
"Atlanta, GA" (Shawty Lo featuring The-Dream, Ludacris and Gucci Mane)	2010	—	—	—	—	—	—	—	—	—	—		Fright Night
"Sponsor" (Teairra Marí featuring Gucci Mane and Soulja Boy)	2010	— (Note: "Sponsor" did not enter the Billboard Hot 100, but peaked at number 21 on the Bubbling Under Hot 100 Singles chart.)	25	—	—	—	—	—	—	—	—		Sincerely Yours
"Countin' Money" (Bun B featuring Gucci Mane and Yo Gotti)	2010	—	— (Note: "Countin' Money" did not enter the Hot R&B/Hip-Hop Songs chart, but peaked at number 12 on the Bubbling Under R&B/Hip-Hop Singles chart, which acts as a 25-song extension to the Hot R&B/Hip-Hop Songs chart.)	—	—	—	—	—	—	—	—		Trill OG
"Sex on My Money" (John Brown featuring Gucci Mane)	2010	—	69	—	—	—	—	—	—	—	—		Non-album single
"I Just Wanna Party" (Yelawolf featuring Gucci Mane)	2010	—	— (Note: "I Just Wanna Party" did not enter the Hot R&B/Hip-Hop Songs chart, but peaked at number nine on the Bubbling Under R&B/Hip-Hop Singles chart.)	—	—	—	—	—	—	—	—		Trunk Muzik 0-60
"For the Hood" (Yo Gotti featuring Gucci Mane)	2010	—	86	—	—	—	—	—	—	—	—		Non-album singles
"Cologne" (John Blu featuring Twista and Gucci Mane)	2011	—	70	—	—	—	—	—	—	—	—		Non-album singles
"We Gon Ride" (Dreezy featuring Gucci Mane)	2016	—	—	—	—	—	—	—	—	—	—		No Hard Feelings
"Prolly" (Sevyn Streeter featuring Gucci Mane)	2016	—	— (Note: "Prolly" did not enter the Hot R&B/Hip-Hop Songs chart, but peaked at number 50 on the Hot R&B/Hip-Hop Airplay chart.)	—	—	—	—	—	—	—	—		Non-album single
"Black Beatles" (Rae Sremmurd featuring Gucci Mane)	2016	1	1	1	3	9	3	2	6	1	2	RIAA: Diamond; ARIA: 2× Platinum; BEA: Gold; BPI: 2× Platinum; SNEP: Platinum; RMNZ: Gold	SremmLife 2
"2.7 Zéro 10.17" (Kaaris featuring Gucci Mane)	2016	—	—	—	—	—	—	164	—	—	—		Okou Gnakouri
"Good Drank" (2 Chainz featuring Quavo and Gucci Mane)	2016	70	32	22	—	—	—	—	—	—	—	RIAA: 2× Platinum	Hibachi for Lunch
"Buy Back the Block" (Rick Ross featuring 2 Chainz and Gucci Mane)	2016	—	—	—	—	—	—	—	—	—	—		Non-album single
"Party" (Chris Brown featuring Gucci Mane and Usher)	2016	40	14	—	82	—	50	84	—	—	68	RIAA: 2× Platinum; BPI: Gold	Heartbreak on a Full Moon
"That's How I Feel" (Young Dolph featuring Gucci Mane)	2017	—	—	—	—	—	—	—	—	—	—		Bulletproof
"Happy Hour" (Joe featuring Gucci Mane)	2017	—	—	—	—	—	—	—	—	—	—		My Name Is Joe Thomas
"What Happened Last Night" (The Kolors featuring Gucci Mane and Daddy's Groove)	2017	—	—	—	—	—	—	—	—	—	—		You
"Slippery" (Migos featuring Gucci Mane)	2017	29	12	11	—	—	46	—	—	—	—	RIAA: Gold; BPI: Silver	Culture
"Perfect Pint" (Mike Will Made It featuring Kendrick Lamar, Rae Sremmurd and Gucci Mane)	2017	—	— (Note: "Perfect Pint" did not enter the Hot R&B/Hip-Hop Songs chart, but peaked at number six on the Bubbling Under R&B/Hip-Hop Singles chart.)	—	—	—	—	—	—	—	—		Ransom 2
"Down" (Fifth Harmony featuring Gucci Mane)	2017	42	—	—	66	— (Note: "Down" did not enter the Flanders Ultratop 50, but peaked at number 22 on the Ultratip chart.)	46	73	94	—	47	RIAA: Gold; MC: Gold; BPI: Silver	Fifth Harmony
"Liife" (Desiigner featuring Gucci Mane)	2017	—	—	—	—	—	—	—	—	—	—		Non-album single
"Fetish" (Selena Gomez featuring Gucci Mane) (Note: This song only appears on the Target deluxe edition of Rare.)	2017	27	—	—	23	— (Note: "Fetish" did not enter the Flanders Ultratop 50, but peaked at number ten on the Ultratip chart.)	10	31	49	16	33	RIAA: Platinum; ARIA: 2× Platinum; BPI: Gold; MC: 2× Platinum; RMNZ: Platinum; SNEP: Gold	Rare
"Lit" (Steve Aoki and Yellow Claw featuring Gucci Mane and T-Pain)	2017	—	—	—	—	—	—	—	—	—	—		Steve Aoki Presents Kolony
"Do Re Mi" (Remix) (Blackbear featuring Gucci Mane)	2017	40	12	—	—	— (Note: "do re mi" did not enter the Flemish Ultratop chart, but peaked at number 63 on the Ultratip chart.)	62	—	—	— (Note: "do re mi [Remix]" did not enter the NZ Top 40 Singles Chart, but peaked at number 8 on the NZ Heatseekers Singles Chart.)	94	BPI: Gold	Non-album singles
"It's Everyday Bro (Remix)" (Jake Paul featuring Gucci Mane)	2017	—	—	—	—	—	—	—	—	—	—		Non-album singles
"Cool" (Felix Jaehn featuring Marc E. Bassy and Gucci Mane)	2018	—	—	—	—	—	—	—	—	—	—		I
"Body Guard" (Q Da Fool featuring Gucci Mane)	2018	—	—	—	—	—	—	—	—	—	—		Non-album single
"Might Be" (T-Pain featuring Gucci Mane)	2018	—	—	—	—	—	—	—	—	—	—		Topsy
"All I Need" (Dimitri Vegas and Like Mike featuring Gucci Mane)	2018	—	—	—	—	—	—	—	—	—	—		Non-album single
"Survive" (Don Diablo featuring Emeli Sandé and Gucci Mane)	2018	—	—	—	—	—	—	—	—	—	—		Forever
"Mop" (Borgore featuring Gucci Mane and Thirty Rack)	2018	—	—	—	—	—	—	—	—	—	—		Non-album singles
"Different Game" (Jackson Wang featuring Gucci Mane)	2018	—	—	—	—	—	—	—	—	—	—		Non-album singles
"With You" (Jay Sean featuring Gucci Mane and Asian Doll)	2019	—	—	—	—	—	—	—	—	—	—		Non-album singles
"Bacc At It Again" (Yella Beezy featuring Quavo and Gucci Mane)	2019	78	30	24	—	—	—	—	—	—	—	RIAA: Gold	Non-album singles
"Enzo" (DJ Snake and Sheck Wes featuring Offset, 21 Savage and Gucci Mane)	2019	—	—	—	—	—	—	—	—	—	—		Carte Blanche
"En Sang" (Emil Stabil featuring Gucci Mane)	2019	—	—	—	—	—	—	—	—	—	—		Non-album single
"Like That" (Doja Cat featuring Gucci Mane)	2020	50	21	—	67	—	29	—	—	— (Note: "Like That" did not enter the NZ Top 40 Singles Chart, but peaked at number 23 on the NZ Hot Singles Chart.)	62	RIAA: 2× Platinum; BPI: Gold	Hot Pink
"Feel Like Guwop" (Ola Runt featuring Gucci Mane)	2020	—	—	—	—	—	—	—	—	—	—		Non-album single
"Muwop" (Mulatto featuring Gucci Mane)	2020	— (Note: "Muwop" did not enter the Billboard Hot 100, but peaked at number four on the Bubbling Under Hot 100 Singles chart.)	40	—	—	—	—	—	—	—	—	RIAA: Gold	Queen of Da Souf
"No Luv" (K Shiday and Enchanting featuring Gucci Mane, Key Glock, and Big Scarr)	2020	—	—	—	—	—	—	—	—	—	—		So Icy Gang, Vol. 1
"1017 Loaded" (Roboy featuring Gucci Mane, Big Scarr, Enchanting, Foogiano, K Shiday, and Pooh Shiesty)	2020	—	—	—	—	—	—	—	—	—	—		So Icy Gang, Vol. 1
"Don't Like Me" (Rico Nasty featuring Gucci Mane and Don Toliver)	2020	—	—	—	—	—	—	—	—	—	—		Nightmare Vacation
"SoIcyBoyz 3" (Big Scarr featuring Gucci Mane, Pooh Shiesty, Foogiano, and Tay Keith)	2021	—	—	—	—	—	—	—	—	—	—		Big Grim Reaper
"Empty the Bag" (Lil' Cory featuring Gucci Mane)	2023	—	—	—	—	—	—	—	—	—	—		Non-album singles
"Hit" (Bossman Dlow featuring Gucci Mane)	2025	—	47	—	—	—	—	—	—	—	—		Non-album singles
"—" denotes a recording that did not chart or was not released in that territory.

=== Promotional singles ===
List of promotional singles, with selected chart positions, showing year released and album name
Title	Year	Peak chart positions				Certifications	Album
Title	Year	US	US R&B/HH	US Rap	CAN	Certifications	Album
"Worst Enemy"	2009	—	—	—	—		The State vs. Radric Davis
"Heavy"	2009	—	—	—	—		The State vs. Radric Davis
"Making Love to the Money"	2010	—	36	17	—		The Appeal: Georgia's Most Wanted
"Trap Talk"	2010	—	—	—	—		The Appeal: Georgia's Most Wanted
"Weirdo"	2010	—	—	—	—		The Appeal: Georgia's Most Wanted
"No Problems" (featuring Rich Homie Quan and Peewee Longway)	2015	—	—	—	—		The Spot Soundtrack
"Icy Lil Bitch"	2016	—	—	—	—		Woptober
"St. Brick Intro"	2016	— (Note: "St. Brick Intro" did not enter the Billboard Hot 100, but peaked at number seven on the Bubbling Under Hot 100 Singles chart.)	— (Note: "St. Brick Intro" did not enter the Hot R&B/Hip-Hop Songs chart, but peaked at number two on the Bubbling Under R&B/Hip-Hop Singles chart.)	—	—		The Return of East Atlanta Santa
"Stutter"	2016	—	—	—	—		The Return of East Atlanta Santa
"That's It" (Bebe Rexha featuring Gucci Mane and 2 Chainz)	2017	—	—	—	—		All Your Fault: Pt. 2
"Curve" (featuring The Weeknd)	2017	67	28	22	40	RIAA: Platinum	Mr. Davis
"BiPolar" (featuring Quavo)	2018	— (Note: "BiPolar" did not enter the Billboard Hot 100, but peaked at number five on the Bubbling Under Hot 100 Singles chart.)	—	—	—		Evil Genius
"Trappin n Rappin" (Big Scarr featuring Gucci Mane)	2023	—	—	—	—		The Secret Weapon
"Glizock & Wizop" (featuring Key Glock)	2023	—	—	—	—		Breath of Fresh Air
"Talkin to the Streets" (featuring Mac Critter)	2023	—	—	—	—		Breath of Fresh Air
"Thank Me" (featuring Young Dolph)	2023	—	—	—	—		Breath of Fresh Air
"Trap Money" (featuring Li Rye and Sett)	2023	—	—	—	—		Breath of Fresh Air
"Only Time"	2025	—	—	—	—		Episodes
"Back Cooking" (with OJ da Juiceman)	2025	—	—	—	—		Episodes
"—" denotes a recording that did not chart.

== Other charted and certified songs ==
List of songs, with selected chart positions, showing year released and album name
Title	Year	Peak chart positions				Certifications	Album
Title	Year	US	US R&B/HH	US Rap	CAN	Certifications	Album
"Pillz" (featuring Mac Bre-Z)	2006	—	— (Note: "Pillz" did not enter the Hot R&B/Hip-Hop Songs chart, but peaked at number three on the Bubbling Under R&B/Hip-Hop Singles chart.)	—	—		Hard to Kill
"I'm a Dog" (featuring DG Yola)	2008	—	— (Note: "I'm a Dog" did not enter the Hot R&B/Hip-Hop Songs chart, but peaked at number eight on the Bubbling Under R&B/Hip-Hop Singles chart.)	—	—		The State vs. Radric Davis
"Bricks" (featuring OJ da Juiceman and Yo Gotti)	2008	—	— (Note: "Bricks" did not enter the Hot R&B/Hip-Hop Songs chart, but peaked at number 19 on the Bubbling Under R&B/Hip-Hop Singles chart.)	—	—		The State vs. Radric Davis
"Photoshoot"	2008	—	— (Note: "Photoshoot" did not enter the Hot R&B/Hip-Hop Songs chart, but peaked at number 18 on the Bubbling Under R&B/Hip-Hop Singles chart.)	—	—		The State vs. Radric Davis
"I Think I Love Her" (featuring Ester Dean)	2008	—	79	—	—		Wilt Chamberlain (Part 5)
"Shine Blockas" (Big Boi featuring Gucci Mane)	2009	—	— (Note: "Shine Blockas" did not enter the Hot R&B/Hip-Hop Songs chart, but peaked at number 23 on the Bubbling Under R&B/Hip-Hop Singles chart.)	—	—		Sir Lucious Left Foot: The Son of Chico Dusty
"Sex in Crazy Places" (featuring Bobby V, Nicki Minaj and Trina)	2009	—	— (Note: "Sex In Crazy Places" did not enter the Hot R&B/Hip-Hop Songs chart, but peaked at number 22 on the Bubbling Under R&B/Hip-Hop Singles chart.)	—	—		The State vs. Radric Davis
"Up in My Heart" (Sean Garrett featuring Gucci Mane)	2009	—	— (Note: "Up In My Heart" did not enter the Hot R&B/Hip-Hop Songs chart, but peaked at number two on the Bubbling Under R&B/Hip-Hop Singles chart.)	—	—		Non-album song
"MC Hammer" (Rick Ross featuring Gucci Mane)	2010	—	78	—	—		Teflon Don
"Beat It Up" (featuring Trey Songz)	2010	—	36	22	—		Burrrprint (2) HD and The Appeal: Georgia's Most Wanted
"Atlanta Zoo" (featuring Ludacris)	2010	—	— (Note: "Atlanta Zoo" did not enter the Hot R&B/Hip-Hop Songs chart, but peaked at number 15 on the Bubbling Under R&B/Hip-Hop Singles chart.)	—	—		Burrrprint (2) HD
"911 Emergency"	2010	—	— (Note: "911 Emergency" did not enter the Hot R&B/Hip-Hop Songs chart, but peaked at number 15 on the Bubbling Under R&B/Hip-Hop Singles chart.)	—	—		Burrrprint (2) HD
"Freeze Me" (Young Dro featuring Gucci Mane and T.I.)	2010	—	— (Note: "Freeze Me" did not enter the Hot R&B/Hip-Hop Songs chart, but peaked at number 14 on the Bubbling Under R&B/Hip-Hop Singles chart.)	—	—		Non-album song
"Haterade" (featuring Nicki Minaj and Pharrell)	2010	—	— (Note: "Haterade" did not enter the Hot R&B/Hip-Hop Songs chart, but peaked at number 22 on the Bubbling Under R&B/Hip-Hop Songs chart.)	—	—		The Appeal: Georgia's Most Wanted
"Watch Me Do My Thang" (Rich Kidd featuring Gucci Mane)	2011	—	— (Note: "Watch Me Do My Thang" did not enter the Hot R&B/Hip-Hop Songs chart, but peaked at number 24 on the Bubbling Under R&B/Hip-Hop Singles chart.)	—	—		We Don't See 'Em 2
"Mouth Full of Golds" (featuring Birdman)	2011	—	93	—	—		The Return of Mr. Zone 6
"I Don't Love Her" (featuring Rocko and Webbie)	2011	—	— (Note: "I Don't Love Her" did not enter the Hot R&B/Hip-Hop Songs chart, but peaked at number two on the Bubbling Under R&B/Hip-Hop Singles chart.)	—	—		The Return of Mr. Zone 6
"Handle'n My Business" (L.E.P. featuring Gucci Mane)	2011	—	— (Note: "Handle'n My Business" did not enter the Hot R&B/Hip-Hop Songs chart, but peaked at number 24 on the Bubbling Under R&B/Hip-Hop Singles chart.)	—	—		Non-album song
"Madonna" (PBZ featuring Gucci Mane)	2011	—	— (Note: "Madonna" did not enter the Hot R&B/Hip-Hop Songs chart, but peaked at number three on the Bubbling Under R&B/Hip-Hop Singles chart.)	—	—		I Got the Internet Goin' Nuts, Vol. 3
"Plain Jane" (featuring Rocko and T.I.)	2012	—	— (Note: "Plain Jane" did not enter the Hot R&B/Hip-Hop Songs chart, but peaked at number ten on the Bubbling Under R&B/Hip-Hop Singles chart.)	—	—		I'm Up
"Hood Rich Anthem" (DJ Scream featuring 2 Chainz, Future, Fozzie Bear, Yo Gotti and Gucci Mane)	2012	—	96	—	—		Long Live the Hustle
"Pussy Print" (featuring Kanye West)	2016	89	31	25	—		Everybody Looking
"Floyd Mayweather" (Young Thug featuring Travis Scott, Gucci Mane and Gunna)	2016	— (Note: "Floyd Mayweather" did not enter the Billboard Hot 100, but peaked at number four on the Bubbling Under Hot 100 Singles chart.)	41	—	—		Jeffery
"She on My Dick" (Rick Ross featuring Gucci Mane)	2017	—	— (Note: "She on My Dick" did not enter the Hot R&B/Hip-Hop Songs chart, but peaked at number ten on the Bubbling Under R&B/Hip-Hop Singles chart.)	—	—		Rather You Than Me
"Met Gala" (featuring Offset)	2017	88	37	—	93	RIAA: Platinum	Drop Top Wop
"Both Eyes Closed" (featuring 2 Chainz & Young Dolph)	2017	—	—	—	—	RIAA: Gold	Drop Top Wop
"Stunting Ain't Nuthin" (featuring Slim Jxmmi and Young Dolph)	2017	95	39	—	—		Mr. Davis
"Enormous" (featuring Ty Dolla Sign)	2017	— (Note: "Enormous" did not enter the Billboard Hot 100, but peaked at number 17 on the Bubbling Under Hot 100 Singles chart.)	—	—	—		Mr. Davis
"CC" (Migos featuring Gucci Mane)	2018	96	45	—	93		Culture II
"Anyway" (Lil Baby featuring 2 Chainz and Gucci Mane)	2018	—	—	—	—	RIAA: Gold	Street Gossip
"Realist in It" (Lil Baby featuring Offset and Gucci Mane)	2018	—	—	—	—	RIAA: Gold	Street Gossip
"Gospel" (DaBaby featuring Chance the Rapper, Gucci Mane and YK Osiris)	2019	55	32	—	82	RIAA: Gold	Kirk
"Big Boy Diamonds" (featuring Kodak Black and London on da Track)	2019	100	49	—	—	RIAA: Gold	Woptober II
"Ugly" (Pooh Shiesty featuring Gucci Mane)	2021	— (Note: "Ugly" did not enter the Billboard Hot 100, but peaked at number 6 on the Bubbling Under Hot 100 Singles chart.)	46	—	—	RIAA: Gold	Shiesty Season
"Pricey" (J. Cole and Ari Lennox featuring Young Dro and Gucci Mane)	2024	29	13	12	49		Might Delete Later
"They Wanna Have Fun" (with Metro Boomin, Travis Porter and Young Dro)	2025	—	42	—	—		A Futuristic Summa
"—" denotes a recording that did not chart or was not released in that territory.

== Guest appearances ==
List of non-single guest appearances, with other performing artists, showing year released and album name
Title	Year	Other artist(s)	Album
"Get Doe"	2006	La Chat, All Star Cashville Prince	Bad Influence
"Got 'Em 4 the Lo"	2008	Shawty Lo, Stuntman	Units in the City
"Icey"	2008	Baby D, Shawty Lo	A-Town Secret Weapon
"Put Me In the Freezer"	2008	Shawty Lo, Baby D	The Future Presentation
"Dangerous"	2008	MJG, 8Ball	This Might Be the Day
"What They Do"	2008	Khia	Nasti Muzik
"Money"	2008	Gorilla Zoe	I Am Atlanta
"100's, 50's, 20's, 10's"	2008	Gorilla Zoe, Jody Breeze	I Am Atlanta
"Ucud Gedit"	2008	Nelly, R. Kelly	Brass Knuckles
"Love for Money"	2008	Willie the Kid, La the Darkman, Bun B, Flo Rida, Yung Joc, Trey Songz	Absolute Greatness
"The Recipe"	2008	E-40, Bun B	The Ball Street Journal
"Shoppin' Spree"	2008	Soulja Boy, Yo Gotti	iSouljaBoyTellem
"Everyday"	2008	Tracy T	Swagger Right Chapter
"Stunt"	2008	Tracy T	Swagger Right Chapter
"Bang Smack"	2009	Project Pat	Real Recognize Real
"Love for Money"	2009	DJ Drama, Willie the Kid, La the Darkman, Bun B, Flo Rida, Yung Joc, Trey Songz	Gangsta Grillz: The Album (Vol. 2)
"Smoke"	2009	DJ Drama, Willie the Kid, Lonnie Mac	Gangsta Grillz: The Album (Vol. 2)
"30 Inches" (Remix)	2009	Juicy J, Project Pat	Hustle Till I Die
"Walking on Ice"	2009	Twista, OJ Da Juiceman	Category F5
"Trunk"	2009	Killer Mike, K. Digga	Underground Atlanta
"Haters Got Me Wrong"	2009	Z-Ro, Chris Ward	Cocaine
"Trick'n Off"	2009	Triple C's, Drumma Boy	Custom Cars & Cycles
"Put Ya Hood Up"	2009	Shawty Lo, Busta Rhymes	Fright Night
"Steady Mobbin""	2009	Young Money, Lil Wayne	We Are Young Money
"Trouble"	2010	RichGirl	None
"Broom"	2010	Gorilla Zoe	The Mighty "ZOE" Young
"Party No Mo"	2010	Ludacris	Battle of the Sexes
"Whip It Up"	2010	E-40, YV	Revenue Retrievin': Day Shift
"Cuffin'"	2010	Cam'ron, U.N.	Heat In Here Vol. 1
"Shine Blockas"	2010	Big Boi	Sir Lucious Left Foot: The Son of Chico Dusty
"Shine Blockas" (Remix)	2010	Big Boi, Bun B, Project Pat	Sir Lucious Left Foot: The Son of Chico Dusty
"MC Hammer"	2010	Rick Ross	Teflon Don
"Why You Up in Here"	2010	Flo Rida, Ludacris, Git Fresh	Only One Flo (Part 1)
"Girl After Girl"	2010	Juicy J, Nicki Minaj	Rubba Band Business
"Billionaire" (Remix)	2010	Travie McCoy, Bruno Mars, T-Pain, One Chance	Lazarus
"Animal"	2011	Killer Mike	PL3DGE
"2 Deep"	2011	Waka Flocka Flame, YG Hootie, Frenchie, Wooh da Kid, Ice Burgundy, Lil Capp, Slim Dunkin	DuFlocka Rant" 10 Toes Down
"Crazy"	2011	Gorilla Zoe	King Kong
"Pill Pop'n"	2011	The Dayton Family	Charges of Indictment
"Wow"	2011	Game	Hood Morning (No Typo): Candy Coronas
"I'm on Worldstar"	2011	Drumma Boy, 2 Chainz, Young Buck	The Birth of D-Boy Fresh
"Me & My Money"	2011	DJ Drama	Third Power
"Clayco"	2011	Cartel MGM, Waka Flocka Flame, Kebo Gotti, Lil Capp	Mafia Made 2
"Brand New"	2012	YC	Back From Vacation
"Top Chef"	2012	Akon, French Montana	None
"I Want In"	2012	Jadakiss, Sheek Louch	Consignment
"Translation"	2012	Cartel MGM, Yo Gotti	Kilo Lingo
"Loyal"	2012	Richie Wess, Waka Flocka Flame	None
"Make It Look Easy"	2012	Busta Rhymes	Year of the Dragon
"50K"	2012	Waka Flocka Flame	Salute Me or Shoot Me 4 (Banned from America)
"Money Pile"	2012	Waka Flocka Flame, Yo Gotti, D Dash	Salute Me or Shoot Me 4 (Banned from America)
"I'm the Shit"	2012	Caddy Da Don, Stakk Grams	Cut the Check
"He's from the A"	2012	Micole, The-Dream, Roscoe Dash, DJ Drama	None
"My Audemars"	2012	DJ Drama, Meek Mill, Birdman	Quality Street Music
"Shake Dat"	2012	Verse Simmonds, Red Cafe	Fuck Your Feelings
"Mobbin" (Remix)	2012	Maino, Busta Rhymes, Jim Jones, Yo Gotti, Trae tha Truth	The Mafia
"Rock Body"	2012	Bobby V	Dusk Till Dawn
"Shout Out"	2012	Ice Burgandy	Burberry Burgandy
"W.I.L.L."	2012	DJ Paul	A Person of Interest
"Play With Me"	2012	Bloody Jay, Rocko	Blatanta (Bigger Than Rap)
"Do It" (Remix)	2012	Mykko Montana, Nelly, Yo Gotti, Travis Porter, Jeremih, Nitti Beatz	Scorpio Season
"Faster"	2012	Young Scooter, Alley Boy	Voice Of The Streetz
"Telephuck"	2012	Mr. Muthafuckin eXquire	Power & Passion
"Hood Like A Zoo"	2012	Chubbie Baby, Young Scooter	36 Oz, Part 2
"Do A Trick" (Remix)	2012	Travis Porter	Mr. Porter
"A +" (Remix)	2012	Young Dolph	Blue Magic
"My Real Life"	2012	Young Dolph	Blue Magic
"Booked Up"	2012	Young Dolph	A Time 2 Kill
"Standin' On The Couch"	2012	Cartie	The Streets Know
"The Curb"	2012	Cash Out	Keisha
"Narcotics"	2012	Juvenile, Young Juve	Juvie Tuesdays
"I Hit That"	2012	Mike WiLL Made It, Juicy J	Est. In 1989 2.5
"Any Many Miny Mo"	2012	Mike WiLL Made It, Future	Est. In 1989 2.5
"Pretty Flacko" (Remix)	2012	ASAP Rocky, Waka Flocka Flame, Pharrell	None
"Rap Niggaz"	2012	OG Boo Dirty, Rocko	Definition Of A G
"Sky Diving"	2012	OG Boo Dirty, Young Scooter	Definition Of A G
"We Gone"	2012	OG Boo Dirty, Young Dolph	Definition Of A G
"All I Know Is The Money"	2012	Big-B	Power Moves
"2 Girls"	2012	Tony Yayo	Sex, Drugs, & Hip-Hop
"Work"	2013	Young Scooter	Street Lottery
"Project Building"	2013	E-40, Young Scooter	The Block Brochure: Welcome to the Soil 5
"Street Lights"	2013	Young Scooter, OJ Da Juiceman	Non-album single
"Finesse"	2013	Brinx Billions	IAintNoFnRapper
"Slap"	2013	8Ball	Premro 2
"Going"	2013	Bow Wow	Greenlight 5
"Fell"	2013	Waka Flocka Flame, Young Thug	DuFlocka Rant 2
"You Can Tell"	2013	Rocko	Gift of Gab 2
"Colombia" (Remix)	2013	Young Scooter, Rick Ross, Birdman	None
"Jungle"	2013	Young Thug	1017 Thug
"Shooting Star"	2013	Young Thug	1017 Thug
"Nigeria"	2013	Young Thug, Peewee Longway	1017 Thug
"Pass Around"	2013	Young Scooter, Wale	Juughouse
"Make Room" (Remix)	2013	A-Wax, DJ Paul	Jesus Malverde
"Play Wit Dis"	2013	Shawty Lo	I'm Da Man 4
"MVP"	2013	Shawty Lo, Rocko	I'm Da Man 4
"Sky High"	2013	Jae Millz, Birdman, Khalil	Property Of Potentness 2
"One Night Sum"	2013	AMG Alliance, Young Snead	The Co-Sign
"No Hook"	2013	Trinidad James	XXL 2013's Freshmen Class: The Mixtape
"Celebration"	2013	D Dash	Mill B4 Dinner Time
"MWZC"	2013	DJ Scream, Waka Flocka Flame, Project Pat	The Ratchet Superior
"Ea$tside"	2013	Trinidad James, Young Scooter, Alley Boy, Childish Gambino	10 PC Mild
"Project Building"	2013	E-40, Young Scooter	The Block Brochure: Welcome to the Soil 5
"Sexual Healing"	2013	Tony Yayo	Godfather of the Ghetto
"Dennis Rodman"	2013	Migos	Y.R.N. (Young Rich N*ggas)
"Trap Remix"	2014	Rich the Kid	Rich Than Famous
"Get Down"	2014	Migos	Solid Foundation
"Never Had Shit"	2015	Kevin McCall, Constantine	RnG Muzic
"10 Times"	2015	Freddie Gibbs, E-40	Shadow of a Doubt
"Again"	2015	Young Thug	Slime Season
"They Can't Stop Us"	2015	Ralo	Famerican Gangster
"Plug"	2016	Hoodrich Pablo Juan, Johnny Cinco	Designer Drugz 2
"Vibin in This Bih"	2016	Kodak Black	Lil B.I.G. Pac
"Work for It"	2016	DJ Khaled, Big Sean, 2 Chainz	Major Key
"Floyd Mayweather"	2016	Young Thug, Travis Scott, Gunna	Jeffery
"Oh Lord"	2016	Lil Wayne	The Birth of a Nation: The Inspired By Album
"All Day"	2016	E-40	The D-Boy Diary: Book 1
"Secure the Bag"	2016	The Lox, Infa-Red	Filthy America... It's Beautiful
"I Drive By"	2016	Riff Raff, Danny Brown	Peach Panther
"Trap"	2016	Juicy J, Peewee Longway	Must Be Nice
"Gold Mouth"	2016	Peewee Longway	Mr. Blue Benjamin
"Strippa"	2016	Young Dolph	Rich Crack Baby
"Dope Boy"	2016	Project Pat	Street God 4
"Cold" (Remix)	2017	Maroon 5, Future	Red Pill Blues (Mexico tour edition)
"Do Re Mi" (Remix)	2017	Blackbear	None
"Crew" (Remix)	2017	GoldLink, Shy Glizzy	None
"Go Get Sum Mo"	2017	Young Dolph, 2 Chainz, Ty Dolla Sign	Thinking Out Loud
"It's Everyday Bro" (Remix)	2017	Jake Paul	None
"Voilà"	2017	N.E.R.D, Wale	No One Ever Really Dies
"Please Shut Up"	2017	ASAP Mob	Cozy Tapes Vol. 2
"Need Some"	2017	Nav, Metro Boomin	Perfect Timing
"The Load"	2017	Lil Baby, Marlo	Control The Streets Vol. 1
"Pull A Caper"	2017	DJ Khaled, Kodak Black, Rick Ross	Grateful
"She On My D*ck"	2017	Rick Ross	Rather You Than Me
"Dangerous Love"	2017	Ralo, Fetty Wap, Sean Garrett	Ralo LaFlare
"I'm Sorry"	2017	Ralo	Ralo LaFlare
"Switching Sides"	2017	Runway Richy	China Cafeteria 2.5
"Sauce On Me"	2017	Hoodrich Pablo Juan	Designer Drugz 3
"CC"	2018	Migos	Culture II
"East Atlanta Day"	2018	Zaytoven, 21 Savage	Trapholizay
"Intro"	2018	Zaytoven	Trapholizay
"F.I.G.H.T."	2018	Mike Will Made It, YG, Trouble, Quavo, Juicy J	Creed II (Soundtrack)
"Anyway"	2018	Lil Baby, 2 Chainz	Street Gossip (Mixtape)
"F*ck It"	2018	Peewee Longway	State Of The Art
"10AM/Save The World"	2018	Metro Boomin	Not All Heroes Wear Capes
"Lamborghini Music"	2018	Ralo	Diary Of The Streets 3
"Real Rich"	2018	Wiz Khalifa	Rolling Papers 2
"Jet Li"	2019	Chief Keef	The Leek Vol. 7
"Done With Her"	2019	Khao, YBN Nahmir, Lil Baby, Tabius Tate	None
"Millions"	2019	Z Money, Hoodrich Pablo Juan	None
"Tsunami"	2019	Joe Young, 6ix9ine, Mike Rebel	None
"Quarter Mill"	2019	Offset	Father of 4
"Bad Girls"	2019	Lil Skies	Shelby
"Exactly How I Feel"	2019	Lizzo	Cuz I Love You
"Icy"	2019	Logic	Confessions of a Dangerous Mind
"Enzo"	2019	DJ Snake, Sheck Wes, 21 Savage, Offset	Carte Blanche
"Big Fish"	2019	Chance The Rapper	The Big Day
"Like That"	2019	Doja Cat	Hot Pink
"Ice"	2020	Haftbefehl	Das weisse Album
"Ballin on a Bitch"	2020	Foogiano	So Icy Summer
"Homeboy on a Shirt"	2020	K Shiday, Enchanting	So Icy Gang, Vol. 1
"How We Do It"	2020	Roboy, Pooh Shiesty	So Icy Gang, Vol. 1
"Backend"	2020	Foogiano, Jacquees	Gutta Baby
"Ugly"	2021	Pooh Shiesty	Shiesty Season
"Tony Montana"	2021	Tony Effe	Untouchable
"De La Hoya"	2023	Belly	Mumble Rap 2

== Music videos ==
=== As lead artist ===
List of music videos, with albums, showing year released
Title	Year	Album
"Icy" (featuring Young Jeezy)	2005	Trap House
"Street Niggaz"	2006	Hard to Kill
"Freaky Gurl"	2006	Hard to Kill
"Pillz" (featuring Mac Bre-Z)	2006	Hard to Kill
"Bird Flu"	2007	Ice Attack: Part 2
"Dat Boi Cold" (featuring K. Riley)	2007	Bird Flu
"East Atlanta 6"	2007	No Pad, No Pencil
"My Kitchen"	2007	No Pad, No Pencil
"Hella Ones"	2007	No Pad, No Pencil
"Dunn Dunn" (Shawty Lo)	2007	Guapaholics (with Shawty Lo)
"Got Em 4 The Lo"	2007	Guapaholics (with Shawty Lo)
"Bricks"	2008	EA Sportscenter
"Faces" (featuring Yung Fresh and Young Ralph)	2008	EA Sportscenter
"Rich Nigga Shit"	2008	EA Sportscenter
"Jewelry"	2008	EA Sportscenter
"Lots of Cash" (featuring Rocko and Yo Gotti)	2008	EA Sportscenter
"Sun Valley" (featuring Frenchie)	2008	EA Sportscenter
"Ridiculous" (featuring Yo Gotti)	2008	Mr. Perfect
"Colors"	2008	Gucci Sosa
"Mo Money" (featuring OJ da Juiceman)	2008	Gucci Sosa
"Mo Money"	2008	Definition of a G (with Yo Gotti)
"I'm a Star"	2008	The Movie
"Photoshoot"	2008	The Movie
"I Live in A T.V."	2008	The Movie
"Shirt Off" (featuring So Icey Boys)	2008	The Movie
"Going In"	2009	Writing on the Wall
"First Day Out"	2009	Writing on the Wall
"Wasted" (featuring Plies)	2009	Writing on the Wall
"Everything" (featuring Yung L.A. and Supa)	2009	Writing on the Wall
"She Got a Friend" (featuring Juelz Santana and Big Boi)	2009	Writing on the Wall
"Hottest Rapper" (featuring Waka Flocka Flame)	2009	The Movie: Part 2 (The Sequel)
"Break Up" (Mario featuring Gucci Mane and Sean Garrett)	2009	The Movie: Part 2 (The Sequel)
"O Let's Do It" (Waka Flocka Flame)	2009	The Movie: Part 2 (The Sequel)
"I Think I Want Her"	2009	Burrrprint 3D: (The Movie: Part 3)
"Yelp I Got All of That"	2009	Burrrprint 3D: (The Movie: Part 3)
"Candy Lady" (featuring OJ da Juiceman, Wooh da Kid, Waka Flocka Flame and Frenchie)	2009	Burrrprint 3D: (The Movie: Part 3)
"Heavy"	2009	The State vs. Radric Davis
"All About the Money" (featuring Rick Ross)	2009	The State vs. Radric Davis
"Lemonade"	2009	The State vs. Radric Davis
"Bingo" (featuring Soulja Boy and Waka Flocka Flame)	2009	The State vs. Radric Davis
"Spotlight" (featuring Usher)	2009	The State vs. Radric Davis
"The Movie"	2009	The State vs. Radric Davis
"Worst Enemy"	2009	The State vs. Radric Davis
"Boy from the Block"	2010	Burrrprint (2) HD
"Everybody Looking"	2010	Burrrprint (2) HD
"Antisocial" (featuring Mylah)	2010	Burrrprint (2) HD
"911 Emergency"	2010	Burrrprint (2) HD
"Normal"	2010	Mr. Zone 6
"Mr. Zone 6"	2010	Mr. Zone 6
"Making Love to the Money"	2010	Mr. Zone 6
"Long Money"	2010	Mr. Zone 6
"Trap Talk"	2010	Jewelry Selection
"Gucci Time" (featuring Swizz Beatz)	2010	Jewelry Selection
"Bite Me" (featuring Waka Flocka Flame)	2010	Ferrari Music
"Get Up Off Me" (featuring Wooh da Kid)	2010	Ferrari Music
"What It's Gonna Be"	2010	The Appeal: Georgia's Most Wanted
"Remember When" (featuring Ray J)	2010	The Appeal: Georgia's Most Wanted
"Weirdo"	2010	The Appeal: Georgia's Most Wanted
"Gucci 2 Time"	2011	Gucci 2 Time
"What I Do" (featuring Waka Flocka Flame and OJ da Juiceman)	2011	Gucci 2 Time
"Bought a Chicken" (featuring OJ da Juiceman and Wooh da Kid)	2011	Gucci 2 Time
"Jack Boyz" (Wooh Da Kid featuring Gucci Mane and OJ da Juiceman)	2011	Gucci 2 Time
"Twitter That" (Slim Dunkin featuring Gucci Mane)	2011	Gucci 2 Time
"Everything Bricksquad" (1017 Brick Squad)	2011	Bricksquad Mafia (with 1017 Brick Squad)
"24 Hours"	2011	The Return of Mr. Zone 6
"Mouth Full of Golds" (featuring Birdman)	2011	The Return of Mr. Zone 6
"I Don't Love Her" (featuring Rocko and Webbie)	2011	The Return of Mr. Zone 6
"Camera Ready"	2011	Writing's on the Wall 2
"Two Dope Boys" (featuring Chill Will)	2011	Writing's on the Wall 2
"Recently" (featuring 50 Cent)	2011	Writing's on the Wall 2
"Stevie Wonder"	2011	Free Bricks (with Future)
"Ferrari Boyz"	2011	Ferrari Boyz (with Waka Flocka Flame)
"Young Niggaz"	2011	Ferrari Boyz (with Waka Flocka Flame)
"Pacman"	2011	Ferrari Boyz (with Waka Flocka Flame)
"She Be Puttin' On" (featuring Slim Dunkin)	2011	Ferrari Boyz (with Waka Flocka Flame)
"Let's Get Faded"	2011	BAYTL (with V-Nasty)
"Quiet"	2012	Trap Back
"FaceCard"	2012	Trap Back
"In Love with a White Girl" (featuring Yo Gotti)	2012	Trap Back
"Chicken Room" (featuring Rocko)	2012	Trap Back
"Okay with Me" (featuring 2 Chainz)	2012	Trap Back
"Sometimes" (with Future)	2012	Trap Back
"North Pole"	2012	Trap Back
"Kansas" (featuring Jim Jones)	2012	I'm Up
"Wish You Would" (featuring Verse Simmonds)	2012	I'm Up
"Bought Out Them Racks" (featuring Big Sean)	2012	I'm Up
"Super Cocky"	2012	I'm Up
"Scarface" (featuring Scarface)	2012	I'm Up
"Get Lost" (featuring Birdman)	2012	I'm Up
"Too Sexy" (featuring Jeremih)	2012	I'm Up
"Plain Jane (Remix)" (featuring Rocko and T.I.)	2012	I'm Up
"Head Shots" (featuring Rick Ross)	2012	Trap God
"Money Habits" (featuring Young Scooter)	2012	Trap God
"Crazy" (featuring Waka Flocka Flame)	2012	Trap God
"Rolly Up" (featuring Young Scooter and Waka Flocka Flame)	2012	Trap God
"Fuck the World" (featuring Future)	2012	Trap God
"Shooter" (featuring Young Scooter and Yung Fresh)	2012	Trap God
"Dead Man" (featuring Young Scooter and Trae tha Truth)	2012	Trap God
"Gas and Mud"	2012	Trap God
"Truth"	2012	Trap God
"Nuthin' on Ya" (featuring Wiz Khalifa)	2013	Trap God 2
"Servin"	2013	Trap God 2
"Squad Car" (featuring Big Bank Black and OG Boo Dirty)	2013	Trap God 2
"Breakfast" (featuring Waka Flocka Flame and Peewee Longway)	2013	Trap God 2
"Really Ready" (featuring Young Dolph and Rulet 1017)	2013	Trap God 2
"Break Dancin'" (featuring Young Thug)	2013	Trap God 2
"Free Bricks"	2013	Free Bricks 2 (with Young Scooter)
"Thirsty"	2013	Trap Back 2
"Traphouse 3" (featuring Rick Ross)	2013	Trap House III
"Darker" (featuring Chief Keef)	2013	Trap House III
