= 2006 in hip-hop =

This article summarizes the events, album releases, and album release dates in hip-hop for the year 2006.

== Released albums ==
Release Date	Artist	Album	Label
January 1	Twisted Insane	Shoot for the Face	Brainsick Muzik
January 17	Various Artists	25 to Life (soundtrack)	Eidos Interactive
January 24	CunninLynguists	A Piece of Strange	
January 24	Tha Alkaholiks	Firewater	Waxploitation Records, Koch Records
January 31	Daddy X	Family Ties	Suburban Noize Records
February 5	Sway	This Is My Demo	
February 7	Various Artists	Run The Road Volume 2	
February 7	Dem Franchise Boyz	On Top Of Our Game	So So Def Records, Virgin Records
February 7	J Dilla	Donuts	Stones Throw Records
February 7	Aceyalone	Magnificent City	Decon Records
February 7	Remy Ma	There's Something About Remy: Based on a True Story	Terror Squad Entertainment, SRC Records, Universal Records
February 14	Sérgio Mendes	Timeless	
February 21	Dilated Peoples	20/20	Capitol Records
February 21	Keak Da Sneak	Kunta Kinte	
February 21	Shaggy 2 Dope	F.T.F.O. (Fuck The Fuck Off)	Psychopathic Records
February 28	Jel	Soft Money	
February 28	Kid Rock & The Twisted Brown Trucker Band	Live Trucker	Top Dog Records, Atlantic Records
March 7	El Da Sensei	The Unusual	Fat Beats Records
March 7	Juvenile	Reality Check	UTP Records, Atlantic Records
March 7	Public Enemy & Paris	Rebirth of a Nation	Guerrilla Funk Recordings
March 14	D.M.C.	Checks, Thugs and Rock 'n' Roll	
March 14	E-40	My Ghetto Report Card	BME Recordings, Reprise Records
March 14	Soul Position	Things Go Better With RJ and Al	Rhymesayers Entertainment
March 21	Army of the Pharaohs	The Torture Papers	Babygrande Records
March 21	B.G.	The Heart of tha Streetz, Vol. 2 (I Am What I Am)	Chopper City Records, Koch Records
March 21	The Game	G.A.M.E.	FastLife Records
March 21	M-1	Confidential	Koch Records
March 21	Madlib	The Beat Konducta, Vols. 1 & 2: Movie Scenes	Stones Throw Records
March 21	MURS & 9th Wonder	Murray's Revenge	
March 28	Do or Die	Get That Paper	
March 28	T.I.	King	Grand Hustle Records, Atlantic Records
March 28	Ghostface Killah	Fishscale	Def Jam Recordings
April 1	Hilltop Hoods	The Hard Road	Obese Records
April 4	Bubba Sparxxx	The Charm	Purple Ribbon Records, Virgin Records, Capitol Records, EMI Records
April 4	D-Shot	Callin All Shots	
April 4	Romeo	Lottery	Guttar Music Group, UrbanDigital Media Group, GoDigital Media Group
April 4	Yukon Black	Addiction Services	
April 11	LL Cool J	Todd Smith	Def Jam Recordings
April 18	Axe Murder Boyz	Blood In, Blood Out	Psychopathic Records
April 18	Da BackWudz	Wood Work	
April 25	The Coup	Pick A Bigger Weapon	Epitaph Records
April 25	The Streets	The Hardest Way To Make An Easy Living	
April 25	Zu Ninjaz	Now Justice	
May 2	Dove Shack	Reality Has Got Me Tied Up	
May 2	Mobb Deep	Blood Money	G-Unit Records, Interscope Records
May 9	Gnarls Barkley	St. Elsewhere	Atlantic Records
May 9	Kottonmouth Kings	Nickel Bag	Suburban Noize Records
May 16	Cam'ron	Killa Season	Asylum Records
May 16	Jamie Madrox	Phatso	Psychopathic Records
May 16	Noah23	Amalthea Magnetosphere	Legendary Entertainment, Plague Language
May 16	Saint Dog	USA (Unconformable Social Amputees)	Suburban Noize Records
May 23	Bronze Nazareth	The Great Migration	Think Differently Music, Babygrande Records
May 30	King Syze	Syzemology	Babygrande Records
June 6	Hed PE	Back 2 Base X	Suburban Noize Records
June 6	DJ Khaled	Listennn: The Album	Terror Squad Entertainment, Koch Records
June 6	Kottonmouth Kings	Koast II Koast	
June 6	Ice Cube	Laugh Now, Cry Later	Lench Mob Records
June 6	Rampage	Have You Seen?	Flipmode Records
June 6	Shawnna	Block Music	Def Jam Recordings, Disturbing Tha Peace Records
June 6	Yung Joc	New Joc City	Bad Boy South, Block Entertainment, Atlantic Records
June 13	Busta Rhymes	The Big Bang	Flipmode Records, Aftermath Entertainment, Interscope Records
June 13	Compton's Most Wanted	Music To Gang Bang	B-Dub Records
June 13	Mr. Lif	Mo' Mega	Definitive Jux
June 13	Noah23	Clout	Legendary Entertainment, Plague Language
June 13	Zion I	Break a Dawn	Live Up Records, Handcuts Records
June 20	Field Mob	Light Poles and Pine Trees	Disturbing tha Peace, Geffen Records, Interscope Records
June 20	Kurupt	Same Day, Different Shit	D.P.G. Recordz
June 26	Plan B	Who Needs Actions When You Got Words	
June 27	Ray Cash	Cash on Delivery	Get-O-Vision Entertainment
June 27	Kool Keith	The Return of Dr. Octagon	CMH Records
June 27	Lord Jamar	The 5% Album	Babygrande Records
June 27	Tha Dogg Pound	Cali Iz Active	Doggystyle Records, Koch Records
7L & Esoteric	A New Dope	Babygrande Records	
July 11	Boondox	The Harvest	Psychopathic Records
July 11	Cut Chemist	The Audience's Listening	Warner Bros. Records
July 18	Boot Camp Clik	The Last Stand	Duck Down Music
July 25	Inspectah Deck	The Resident Patient	Urban Iron Records
July 25	Jurassic 5	Feedback	Interscope Records
July 25	MF Grimm	American Hunger	Day by Day Entertainment
July 25	Michael Franti & Spearhead	Yell Fire!	
July 25	M.O.P.	Ghetto Warfare	Full Clip Media
July 25	Pharrell	In My Mind	Star Trak Entertainment, Interscope Records
August 1	Body Count	Murder 4 Hire	Escapi Music
August 1	DMX	Year of the Dog... Again	Ruff Ryders Entertainment, Sony Urban Music, Columbia Records
August 1	Various Artists	No Limit Greatest Hits	Priority Records
August 8	Masta Killa	Made in Brooklyn	Nature Sounds
August 8	Rick Ross	Port of Miami	Def Jam Recordings, Slip-n-Slide Records, Poe Boy Entertainment
August 15	Obie Trice	Second Round's on Me	Shady Records, Interscope
August 22	J Dilla	The Shining	BBE Records
August 22	OutKast	Idlewild	LaFace Records, Jive Records
August 29	Method Man	4:21... The Day After	Def Jam Recordings
August 29	The Roots	Game Theory	Def Jam Recordings
August 29	Young Dro	Best Thang Smokin'	Grand Hustle Records, Atlantic Records
September 4	Missy Elliott	Respect M.E.	Atlantic Records, The Goldmind Inc.
September 5	OuterSpace	Blood Brothers	Babygrande Records
September 12	Skyzoo & 9th Wonder	Cloud 9: The 3 Day High	Traffic Entertainment
September 12	Swollen Members	Black Magic	Battle Axe Records
September 19	Chingy	Hoodstar	Full Dekk Music Group, Capitol Records
September 19	The Dirtball	Raptillion	Suburban Noize Records
September 19	DJ Shadow	The Outsider	Universal Motown Records, Island Records
September 19	Jedi Mind Tricks	Servants in Heaven, Kings in Hell	Babygrande Records
September 19	Lupe Fiasco	Food & Liquor	1st & 15th Entertainment, Atlantic Records
September 19	Potluck	Straight Outta Humboldt	Suburban Noize Records
September 26	Ludacris	Release Therapy	Disturbing tha Peace, Def Jam Recordings
September 26	Main Flow and 7L	Flow Season	Brick Records
October 3	Subtle	For Hero: For Fool	Lex Records
October 3	Sleepy Brown	Mr. Brown	Purple Ribbon Records, Virgin Records, Capitol Records
October 3	Three 6 Mafia	Smoked Out Music: Greatest Hits	Hypnotize Minds Productions
October 3	Unk	Beat'n Down Yo Block!	Big Oomp, Koch Records
October 10	Lloyd Banks	Rotten Apple	G-Unit Records, Interscope Records
October 10	Zion I and The Grouch	Heroes in the City of Dope	Om Records
October 11	Gucci Mane	Chicken Talk	So Icey Entertainment
October 17	Puff Daddy	Press Play	Bad Boy Entertainment, Atlantic Records
October 17	Hi-Tek	Hi-Teknology²: The Chip	Babygrande Records
October 17	Romeo	Greatest Hits	Koch Records
October 17	Xzibit	Full Circle	Open Bar Entertainment, Koch Records
October 23	Braintax	Panorama	Low Life Records
October 24	Gucci Mane	Hard to Kill	Big Cat Records, Tommy Boy Records
October 24	Jibbs	Jibbs feat. Jibbs	Geffen Records
October 31	Ice-T	Gangsta Rap	Melee Entertainment
October 31	Kevin Federline	Playing With Fire	Federation Records
October 31	Lady Sovereign	Public Warning	
October 31	Mobb Deep	Life of the Infamous: The Best of Mobb Deep	Loud Records and Legacy Recordings
October 31	Birdman & Lil Wayne	Like Father, Like Son	Cash Money Records, Universal Records
October 31	Pitbull	El Mariel	TVT Records
November 7	Tech N9ne	Everready (The Religion)	Strange Music
November 7	AZ	The Format	Quiet Money Records
November 7	Jim Jones	Hustler's P.O.M.E. (Product of My Environment)	Diplomat Records, Koch Records
November 14	Akon	Konvicted	SRC Records, Konvict Kulture, UpFront Megatainment, Universal Motown Records
November 14	The Game	Doctor's Advocate	Geffen Records
November 14	Fat Joe	Me, Myself & I	Terror Squad Entertainment, Virgin Records, Imperial Records
November 21	Jay-Z	Kingdom Come	Roc-A-Fella Records, Def Jam Recordings
November 21	Kottonmouth Kings	Hidden Stash III	Suburban Noize Records
November 21	Snoop Dogg	Tha Blue Carpet Treatment	Doggystyle Records, Geffen Records
November 21	2Pac	Pac's Life	Amaru Entertainment, Interscope Records
November 27	CRUNK23	Technoshamanism	Legendary Entertainment, Plague Language
November 28	Clipse	Hell Hath No Fury	Re-Up Records, Star Trak Entertainment, Jive Records
November 28	Too Short	Mack of the Century... Too Short's Greatest Hits	Jive Records
December 5	Lil Scrappy	Bred 2 Die, Born 2 Live	G'$ Up, G-Unit Records, BME Recordings, Reprise Records
December 5	Shady Records	Eminem Presents: The Re-Up	Shady Records, Interscope Records
December 12	Ghostface Killah	More Fish	Def Jam Recordings
December 12	Young Jeezy	The Inspiration	CTE World, Def Jam Recordings
December 12	Romeo	God's Gift (soundtrack)	Guttar Music Group, H. Hood Cinema, UrbanDigital Media Group, GoDigital Media Group
December 18	Trick Daddy	Back by Thug Demand	Dunk Ryder Records, Slip-n-Slide Records, Atlantic Records
December 19	Bow Wow	The Price of Fame	Lil' Bow Wow Records, Sony Urban Music, Columbia Records
December 19	Nas	Hip Hop Is Dead	Def Jam Recordings, Columbia Records
December 26	Various Artists	15 Years on Death Row	Death Row Records
December 26	Gang Starr	Mass Appeal: the Best of Gang Starr	Virgin Records, EMI Recordings
December 26	N.W.A.	The Best of N.W.A: The Strength of Street Knowledge	Priority Records
December 29	Mos Def	True Magic	Geffen Records

== Highest-charting singles ==
Hip hop singles from any year which charted in the 2006 Top 40 of the Billboard Hot 100
Song	Artist	Project	Peak position
"Ridin'"	Chamillionaire featuring Krayzie Bone	The Sound of Revenge	1
"Laffy Taffy"	D4L	Down for Life	1
"Grillz"	Nelly featuring Paul Wall, Ali & Gipp	Sweatsuit	1
"Smack That"	Akon featuring Eminem	Konvicted	2
"What You Know"	T.I.	King	3
"It’s Goin' Down"	Yung Joc featuring Nitti	New Joc City	3
"Where'd You Go"	Fort Minor featuring Holly Brook	The Rising Tied	4
"Control Myself"	LL Cool J featuring Jennifer Lopez	Todd Smith	4
"Shake That"	Eminem featuring Nate Dogg	Curtain Call: The Hits	6
"There It Go (The Whistle Song)"	Juelz Santana	What the Game's Been Missing!	6
"Ms. New Booty"	Bubba Sparxxx featuring Ying Yang Twins & Mr. ColliPark	The Charm	7
"Lean wit It, Rock wit It"	Dem Franchise Boyz featuring Peanut and Charlay	On Top of Our Game	7
"Chain Hang Low"	Jibbs	Jibbs Feat. Jibbs	7
"Show Me What You Got"	Jay-Z	Kingdom Come	8
"Walk It Out"	Unk	Beat'n Down Yo Block!	10
"Shoulder Lean"	Young Dro featuring T.I.	Best Thang Smokin'	10
"You Don't Know"	Eminem, 50 Cent, Lloyd Banks & Ca$his	Eminem Presents: The Re-Up	12
"I Luv It"	Jeezy	Thug Motivation 102: The Inspiration	14
"I Think They Like Me (Remix)"	Dem Franchise Boyz featuring Jermaine Dupri, Da Brat & Bow Wow	On Top of Our Game	15
"Touch It"	Busta Rhymes	The Big Bang	16
"That's That"	Snoop Dogg featuring R. Kelly	Blue Carpet Treatment	20
"Stuntin' Like My Daddy"	Birdman & Lil Wayne	Like Father, Like Son	21
"Poppin' My Collar"	Three 6 Mafia	Most Known Unknown	21
"Fresh Azimiz"	Bow Wow featuring J-Kwon & Jermaine Dupri	Wanted	23
"Why You Wanna"	T.I.	King	26
"Money in the Bank"	Lil Scrappy featuring Young Buck	Bred 2 Die, Born 2 Live	28
"Best Friend"	50 Cent & Olivia	Get Rich or Die Tryin' (soundtrack)	35

== Highest first week sales ==
As of December 31, 2010.

Number	Artist	Album	1st week sales	1st week position
1	Jay-Z	Kingdom Come	680,000	#1
2	T.I.	King	522,000	#1
3	The Game	Doctor's Advocate	358,000	#1
4	Nas	Hip Hop Is Dead	356,000	#1
5	Jeezy	The Inspiration	352,000	#1
6	Shady Records	Eminem Presents: The Re-Up	309,000	#2
7	Ludacris	Release Therapy	309,000	#1
8	Snoop Dogg	Tha Blue Carpet Treatment	264,000	#5
9	Bow Wow	The Price of Fame	262,001	#6
10	Busta Rhymes	The Big Bang	209,000	#1

== Highest critically reviewed albums (Metacritic) ==
Number	Artist	Album	Average score	Number of reviews	Reference
1	Clipse	Hell Hath No Fury	89	29 reviews	
2	Ghostface Killah	Fishscale	88	32 reviews	
3	J Dilla	Donuts	84	15 reviews	
4	The Roots	Game Theory	83	26 reviews	
5	Lupe Fiasco	Food & Liquor	83	20 reviews	
6	Gnarls Barkley	St. Elsewhere	81	37 reviews	
7	J Dilla	The Shining	80	21 reviews	
8	Nas	Hip Hop Is Dead	79	22 reviews	
9	Cut Chemist	The Audience's Listening	79	15 reviews	
10	The Coup	Pick a Bigger Weapon	78	25 reviews	

== See also ==
- Previous article: 2005 in hip-hop
- Next article: 2007 in hip-hop
