= Trap House =

Studio album by Gucci Mane
- Released: May 24, 2005
- Recorded: 2004–05
- Genre: Southern hip-hop; trap
- Length: 68:04
- Label: Big Cat
- Producer: Jacob York (exec.); Marlon "Big Cat" Rowe (exec.); Melvin "Mel-Man" Breeden Executive Producer)(exec.); Nitti; Shawty Redd; The Heatmakerz; Zaytoven

Gucci Mane chronology
La Flare (2001)	Trap House (2005)	Chicken Talk (2006)

Singles from Trap House
- 1. "Icy" Released: April 13, 2005; 2. "Trap House" Released: May 5, 2005; 3. "Money Don't Matter" Released: May 13, 2005; 4. "Go Head" Released: June 22, 2005; 5. "That's All" Released: October 7, 2005

Professional ratings
Review scores
Source	Rating
AllMusic	3.5/5 stars
RapReviews	(4/10)

Trap House is the debut studio album by American rapper Gucci Mane. It was released on May 24, 2005, by Big Cat Records and Tommy Boy Records. Production was handled by Shawty Redd, Zaytoven, Nitti and The Heatmakerz. The album features guest appearances from Young Jeezy, Boo Rossini, Jody Breeze, Khujo, Killer Mike, Lil Scrappy, Bun B, 4tre, Mac Bre-Z, Torica and Young Snead.

The album was supported by five singles: "Icy" featuring Young Jeezy and Boo, "Go Head" featuring Mac Bree-Z, "Money Don't Matter" featuring Torica, "Trap House" and "That's All". All four of these singles received radio airplay, except for the fifth single.

== Singles ==
The commercial debut single, called "Icy" was released as the lead single from the album on April 13, 2005. The song features guest appearances from fellow American rapper Young Jeezy, and American hip-hop recording artist Boo, with production by Zaytoven.

The album's second single, "Go Head" was released on July 5, 2005. The song features a guest appearance from a female rapper Mac Bree-Z, with production by Nitti. The single was also included on Gucci Mane's second album Hard to Kill (2006).

The album's third single, "Money Don't Matter" was released on September 13, 2005. The song features a guest appearance from female American recording artist Torica, with production by Nitti.

The album's title track, "Trap House" was released as the album's fourth single on November 22, 2005. The song was produced by Shawty Redd.

The album's fifth and final single, "That's All" was released on December 7, 2005. The song was produced by Nitti.

== Commercial performance ==
In the United States, Trap House debuted at number 101 on the Billboard 200. It also peaked at number 20 on the US Top R&B/Hip-Hop Albums, and at number five on the US Top Independent Albums charts. To date, the album sold 127,000 copies in the United States.

== Track listing ==
No.	Title	Writer(s)	Producer(s)	Length
1.	"Intro"	Radric Davis; Marlon "Big Cat" Rowe	Gucci Mane	0:38
2.	"Trap House"	Davis; Demetrius Stewart	Shawty Redd	4:19
3.	"That's All"	Davis; Chadron Moore	Nitti	4:38
4.	"Booty Shorts"	Davis; Xavier Dotson	Zaytoven	4:20
5.	"Icy" (featuring Young Jeezy, Boo Rossini and Lil'Will)		Zaytoven	4:43
6.	"Two Thangs"		Shawty Redd	4:18
7.	"Money Don't Matter" (featuring Torica)		Nitti	4:56
8.	"That's My Hood"		Shawty Redd	4:51
9.	"Lawnmower Man"		Zaytoven	4:24
10.	"Pyrex Pot"		Shawty Redd	4:55
11.	"Independent Balling Like a Major #1"			1:04
12.	"Black Tee" (featuring Bun B, Young Jeezy, Killer Mike, Jody Breeze, 4-Tre and Lil Scrappy)		Zaytoven	5:10
13.	"Corner Cuttin" (featuring Khujo)		Shawty Redd	4:38
14.	"Independent Balling Like a Major #2"			0:45
15.	"Hustle"		Zaytoven	4:45
16.	"Damn Shawty" (featuring Young Snead)		The Heatmakerz	4:11
17.	"Go Head" (featuring Mac Bree-Z)		Nitti	5:04
18.	"Outro"			0:25
Total length:				1:08:04

Trap House (20th Anniversary Deluxe Edition) bonus tracks
No.	Title	Producer(s)	Length
19.	"Icy (Remix)" (featuring Jeezy)	Zaytoven	4:16
20.	"Body Language"	Zaytoven	4:16
21.	"My Life"	Zaytoven	4:35
22.	"It's Pouring"	Zaytoven	4:36
Total length:			1:25:47

== Charts ==
Chart (2005)	Peak position
US Billboard 200	101
US Top R&B/Hip-Hop Albums (Billboard)	20
US Top Rap Albums (Billboard)	10
US Independent Albums (Billboard)	5
US Heatseekers Albums (Billboard)	1
