= Last Time (Gucci Mane song) =

Single by Gucci Mane featuring Travis Scott

from the album The Return of East Atlanta Santa
- Released: September 2, 2016
- Length: 4:08
- Label: GUWOP; 1017; Atlantic
- Songwriters: Radric Davis; Jacques Webster II; Xavier Dotson
- Producer: Zaytoven

"Last Time" is a song by American rapper Gucci Mane featuring fellow rapper Travis Scott from the former's tenth studio album, The Return of East Atlanta Santa (2016). It was released as the lead single from the album on September 2, 2016, by GUWOP, 1017, and Atlantic Records. "Last Time" was written by the two artists with producer Zaytoven.

== Composition ==
"Last Time" features Zaytoven "laying jazz piano over trap beats", and begins with Mane rapping about his past as a drug user ("I'm an ex-ex-popper, an online shopper") before addressing the rumors that he was cloned in prison ("Niggas thought I was a clone, they heard me speak proper"). Scott then sings "Last time I took drugs, I just took half of it" over "trickling piano keys".

== Music video ==
The music video for "Last Time" was released on November 28, 2016, and stars Mane and Scott alongside filmmaker Harmony Korine. It features a car on fire, and both artists performing the song in the snow.

== Live performances ==
The two artists performed "Last Time" at the 2016 BET Hip Hop Awards on October 4, 2016, and later on Jimmy Kimmel Live! on December 14, 2016.

== Charts ==
Chart performance
Chart (2016)	Peak position
US R&B/Hip-Hop Airplay (Billboard)	48

== Certifications ==
Certifications
Region	Certification	Certified units/sales
United States (RIAA)	Gold	500,000^{‡}
^{‡} Sales+streaming figures based on certification alone.

== Release history ==
Release dates
Region	Date	Format	Label	Ref.
Various	September 2, 2016	Digital download; streaming	GUWOP; 1017; Atlantic	
