= Chicken Talk =

2006 mixtape by Gucci Mane

Mixtape by Gucci Mane
- Released: October 2006
- Genres: Southern hip-hop; trap
- Length: 101:26
- Label: So Icey Entertainment
- Producers: DJ Paul; Drumma Boy; Juicy J; Raw Beats; Zaytoven

Gucci Mane chronology
Trap House (2005)	Chicken Talk (2006)	Hard to Kill (2006)

Chicken Talk is a mixtape by the American rapper Gucci Mane, released in October 2006. It was Gucci Mane's second mixtape and third overall release, following the 2001 mixtape La Flare and 2005 album Trap House. It features artists including Yo Gotti and Shawty Lo.

Chicken Talk has been named as one of the best hip-hop releases of all time by outlets such as Pitchfork and Rolling Stone Australia.

== Background and recording ==
In May 2005, Gucci Mane released his first studio album, Trap House, but several months later he was sentenced to six months in prison for assault. After his release, Gucci Mane was approached by DJ Burn One, who was interested in collaborating. Gucci initially demurred, as he was contractually obligated to record another album through Big Cat Records, but he reconnected with Burn One after his relationship with Big Cat deteriorated.

According to Burn One, the recording of Chicken Talk lasted "about a month". During the recording process, Gucci was noted for his tireless productivity; collaborators recounted that he would arrive at the recording studio late at night or in the early morning and freestyle verses for hours. Reflecting on the period in his 2017 autobiography, Gucci Mane states that his recording practices during the development of Chicken Talk were influenced by his extensive use of ecstasy at the time.

The cover art of Chicken Talk is a photo of Gucci Mane, taken by DJ Burn One.

== Music ==
Chicken Talk is a trap album. Lawrence Burney of Pitchfork describes its style as "joining the sonic playfulness of Atlanta's snap movement with firsthand accounts of street activity". Its primary topics include "drugs, guns, the South, and everything that comes with it". Chicken Talk also discusses jewelry and Gucci Mane's feud with Young Jeezy.

Musically, Zaytoven's keyboards are one of Chicken Talk's primary sonic hallmarks. Music writers have also commented on elements such as a "lounge-y flute" in "Burn One Freestyle" and "orchestral blasts" in "Stupid".

== Legacy ==
Although Chicken Talk did not attract much media attention at the time of its release, its stature grew over time due to its influence upon trap music. Discussing the mixtape in 2022, Joe Gross of Rolling Stone Australia describes it "a key document in the evolution of both internet-era mixtape culture in general and trap in particular". In 2013, Patrick Montes of OC Weekly called it "one of the few earlier trap classics that still holds its charm and its replay value", and credited the mixtape with welcoming new levels of eccentricity into gangsta rap. A less enthusiastic retroactive review came from Winston Cook-Wilson of Inverse, who regarded Chicken Talk as less "musically distinctive" than Gucci Mane's later mixtapes but acknowledged that it showed early signs of his strengths as an artist.

Outlets such as Vibe and artists such as Zaytoven have described Chicken Talk as one of Gucci Mane's best projects. Additionally, Chicken Talk has appeared on lists of the all-time best hip-hop albums. In 2025, Pitchfork ranked Chicken Talk as the 56th-best rap album of all time; in 2022, Rolling Stone Australia ranked it as the 182nd-best hip-hop album of all time.

== Track listing ==
Writer and producer credits adapted from Apple Music. All tracks written by Radric Davis and produced by Zaytoven, except where noted.

No.	Title	Writer(s)	Producer(s)	Length
1.	"Chicken Talk"			4:37
2.	"Money on the Floor"			4:27
3.	"Street Niggaz"	Davis; Xavier Dotson		4:07
4.	"Burn One Freestyle"			2:26
5.	"Work Ya Wrist" (featuring Yo Gotti)		Drumma Boy	4:40
6.	"My Chain"			3:51
7.	"Drop It Off" (featuring Eva Trill)	Davis; Eva Trill		3:03
8.	"Stupid"			4:16
9.	"745"		DJ Paul; Juicy J	4:09
10.	"Alligators"			3:13
11.	"Iced Up" (featuring Suga Suga)	Davis; Suga Suga		4:11
12.	"Swing My Door"			4:00
13.	"Kermit the Frog"			5:04
14.	"Trap Money" (featuring Shawty Lo)	Davis; Shawty Lo		4:02
15.	"Plug Talk"		Raw Beats	4:23
16.	"How Hood Is This?" (featuring Yo Gotti)	Davis; Yo Gotti	Drumma Boy	4:13
17.	"Giant"		Raw Beats	4:12
18.	"Under Arm Kush"			3:20
19.	"Shook Them Haters Off (Dissin' Big Cat)"			6:36
20.	"Street Smart"	Davis; OJ da Juiceman		4:08
21.	"Zone 6"			3:54
22.	"Heavy Wrist Action"			2:59
23.	"I Heard"			3:07
24.	"Rain Man"		Raw Beats	3:56
25.	"Work Ya Wrist"			4:32
Total length:				1:41:26
