= The Return of East Atlanta Santa =

Studio album by Gucci Mane
- Released: December 16, 2016
- Genre: Hip hop; trap
- Length: 42:54
- Label: GUWOP; Atlantic
- Producer: Bangladesh; Cubeatz; Honorable C.N.O.T.E.; Marz; Metro Boomin; Mike Will Made It; Murda Beatz; Noor Shabazz; OZ; Ricky Racks; Southside; TM88; Tony Trouble; Trabeats; Zaytoven

Gucci Mane chronology
1017 vs. the World (2016)	The Return of East Atlanta Santa (2016)	Droptopwop (2017)

Singles from The Return of East Atlanta Santa
- 1. "Last Time" Released: September 2, 2016; 2. "Drove U Crazy" Released: December 2, 2016; 3. "Both" Released: January 31, 2017

The Return of East Atlanta Santa is the tenth studio album by American rapper Gucci Mane. It was released on December 16, 2016, by GUWOP Enterprises and Atlantic Records. The record serves as Gucci Mane's third commercial release of the year, following his release from prison, after Everybody Looking (2016) and Woptober (2016). The album features guest appearances from rappers Drake and Travis Scott, alongside singer Bryson Tiller, while the production was handled by Metro Boomin, Southside, Bangladesh, Zaytoven, Mike Will Made It and Murda Beatz, among others.

The Return of East Atlanta Santa was supported by three singles: "Last Time", "Drove U Crazy" and "Both", along with two promotional singles, "St. Brick Intro" and "Stutter".

== Background ==
In October 2016, The Return of East Atlanta Santa was announced after the release of Mane's commercial mixtape Woptober, along with its release date. The album title is a continuation of Gucci Mane's Christmas-themed East Atlanta Santa mixtape series. It is the third installment of the series, succeeding East Atlanta Santa (2014) and East Atlanta Santa 2: The Night GuWop Stole X-Mas (2015).

== Singles ==
The album's lead single, "Last Time", was released on September 2, 2016. The song features a guest appearance from American rapper Travis Scott, while the production was provided by Zaytoven.

The album's second single, "Drove U Crazy", was released as the album's third single on December 2, 2016. The song features a guest appearance from American singer Bryson Tiller, while the production was provided by OZ.

"Both" was released as a promotional single on December 15, 2016. It was later sent to urban contemporary radio on January 31, 2017, as the album's third official single. The song features a guest appearance from Canadian rapper Drake, while the production was provided by Southside and Metro Boomin.

=== Promotional singles ===
The album's first promotional single, "St. Brick Intro", was released on November 25, 2016. The song was produced by Zaytoven.

The album's second promotional single, "Stutter", was released on December 9, 2016. The song was produced by Murda Beatz.

== Critical reception ==
Professional ratings
Aggregate scores
Source	Rating
Metacritic	70/100
Review scores
Source	Rating
AllMusic	3/5 stars
Exclaim!	5/10
The Guardian	3/5 stars
HipHopDX	3.7/5
The Irish Times	3/5 stars
Pitchfork	7.6/10

The Return of East Atlanta Santa was met with generally positive reviews. At Metacritic, which assigns a normalized rating out of 100 to reviews from mainstream publications, the album received an average score of 70, based on four reviews.

Renato Pagnani of Pitchfork commented on the improvement of Gucci Mane's performance and vocals, and that the album shows a "more playful side of Gucci's personality, proving along the way that back to business doesn't have to mean an absence of fun". Narsimha Chintaluri of HipHopDX said, "The flows are slicker, and the hooks more engaging. His writing is still standard fare for Gucci, but he doesn't hesitate to play with his delivery".

In a mixed review, The Guardian's Lanre Bakare stated: "These [guest appearances] are mostly successful, with Gucci's one-note delivery providing ballast for the crooning of Tiller, the emo-rap of Drake and the Auto-Tuned oddness of Scott. But Gucci is at his best when solo." The Irish Times stated that "Mane gets on with the gig he's had all year long of celebrating the fact that he currently has his freedom back". Chris Dart of Exclaim! said, "It comes in flashes, and then it's back to a sort of dull, flat affect".

== Track listing ==
The Return of East Atlanta Santa track listing
No.	Title	Writer(s)	Producer(s)	Length
1.	"St. Brick Intro"	Radric Davis; Xavier Dotson	Zaytoven	2:25
2.	"I Can't"	Davis; Leland Wayne; Joshua Luellen	Metro Boomin; Southside	3:28
3.	"Walk on Water"	Davis; Ricky Harrell, Jr.	Ricky Racks	3:35
4.	"Both" (featuring Drake)	Davis; Aubrey Graham; Luellen; Wayne	Metro Boomin; Southside	3:10
5.	"Stutter"	Davis; Shane Lindstrom; Kevin Gomringer; Tim Gomringer	Murda Beatz; Cubeatz	3:11
6.	"Drove U Crazy" (featuring Bryson Tiller)	Davis; Bryson Tiller; Ozan Yildirim	OZ	3:09
7.	"Crash"	Davis; Bryan Simmons	TM88	3:03
8.	"Yet"	Davis; Lindstrom; K. Gomringer; T. Gomringer	Murda Beatz; Cubeatz	3:08
9.	"Nonchalant"	Davis; Michael Williams II; Marquel Middlebrooks	Mike Will Made It; Marz	3:32
10.	"Last Time" (featuring Travis Scott)	Davis; Jacques Webster II; Dotson	Zaytoven	4:08
11.	"Bales"	Davis; Shondrae Crawford; Tranell Sims	Bangladesh; Trabeats	3:40
12.	"No Smoke"	Davis; Carlton Mays, Jr.; Louis Jean; Anthony Frank	Honorable C.N.O.T.E.; Noor Shabazz; Tony Trouble	3:48
13.	"Greatest Show on Earth"	Davis; Williams II	Mike Will Made It	2:37
Total length:				42:54

== Charts ==
=== Weekly charts ===
Chart performance for The Return of East Atlanta Santa
Chart (2017)	Peak position
Canadian Albums (Billboard)	44
US Billboard 200	16
US Top R&B/Hip-Hop Albums (Billboard)	7

=== Year-end charts ===
2017 year-end chart performance for The Return of East Atlanta Santa
Chart (2017)	Position
US Billboard 200	145
US Top R&B/Hip-Hop Albums (Billboard)	77

== Certifications ==
Region	Certification	Certified units/sales
United States (RIAA)	Gold	500,000^{‡}
^{‡} Sales+streaming figures based on certification alone.
