= Icy (Gucci Mane song) =

Single by Gucci Mane featuring Young Jeezy and Boo

from the album Trap House
- Released: April 13, 2005
- Recorded: 2004
- Genre: Hip hop; Southern hip-hop; trap
- Length: 4:43
- Label: Big Cat Records
- Songwriters: Radric Davis; Xavier Dotson; Jay Jenkins; Sabrian Sledge
- Producer: Zaytoven

Gucci Mane singles chronology
"Icy" (2005)	"Freaky Gurl" (2007)

Young Jeezy singles chronology
"Icy" (2005)	"And Then What" (2005)

"Icy" is the debut single by American rapper Gucci Mane, featuring fellow American rappers Young Jeezy and Boo of the group Boo & Gotti. The track was released on April 13, 2005, as the lead single from his debut studio album, Trap House. The track is credited as the breakout song for both Gucci Mane and Jeezy.

== Background ==
In November 2021, Zaytoven, the producer of the song, revealed that Jeezy attempted to buy the song off of him to put on his own debut studio album, Let's Get It: Thug Motivation 101. However, Zaytoven refused the offer, citing his loyalty to Gucci Mane.

== Controversy ==
A dispute over whose song it was first was the source of a feud between Jeezy and Gucci Mane. The beef between them ended on November 19, 2020, when they performed the song together during their Verzuz battle in Atlanta.

== Remixes ==
An extended play (EP) for the song was released on September 13, 2005, featuring a radio edit, instrumental and acapella version of the song.

An unreleased version of the song, which features a short verse from Gucci Mane and the hook, was included on his August 2008 mixtape Wilt Chamberlain, Pt. 3.

Another remix of the song, which included new verses from Gucci Mane (including his verse from the unreleased version) and Jeezy and removed Boo's verse, was released on September 23, 2008, as part of Gucci Mane's unofficial compilation album Hood Classics. The remix was also included on another unofficial compilation album, titled Your Favorite Rapper's Favorite Trapper.

== Charts ==
Chart (2005)	Peak position
US Bubbling Under Hot 100 (Billboard)	5
US Hot R&B/Hip-Hop Songs (Billboard)	46
US Hot Rap Songs (Billboard)	23
US Rhythmic Airplay (Billboard)	37

== Release history ==
Region	Date	Format(s)	Label	Ref.
United States	March 21, 2005	Rhythmic contemporary radio; Urban contemporary radio	Big Cat	
