= The Return of Mr. Zone 6 =

Studio album by Gucci Mane
- Released: March 22, 2011
- Recorded: 2010
- Genre: Southern hip-hop
- Length: 56:10
- Label: 1017 Brick Squad; Warner Bros.; WMGreen
- Producer: Drumma Boy; Zaytoven; Southside

Gucci Mane chronology
Bricksquad Mafia (2011)	The Return of Mr. Zone 6 (2011)	Writing On The Wall 2 (2011)

The Return of Mr. Zone 6 is the eighth studio album by American rapper Gucci Mane. It was released on March 22, 2011, by 1017 Brick Squad Records and Warner Bros. Records. The album features guest appearances from Birdman, Waka Flocka Flame, Master P and Rocko, while the majority of the production was provided by Drumma Boy, except for two tracks that were produced by Zaytoven and Southside.

The album debuted at number 18 on the Billboard 200 and number 2 on the Billboard's Top Rap Albums charts, with first week sales of 22,064 copies in the United States.

== Promotion ==
The music video for "Mouth Full of Golds" featuring Birdman (directed by Mr. Boomtown), was released on February 21, 2011. The track also appeared on Birdman's mixtape, called Bigger Than Life. Released were these two music videos (directed by Mr. Boomtown) for "I Don't Love Her" featuring Rocko and Webbie, and "24 Hours".

== Critical reception ==
Professional ratings
Aggregate scores
Source	Rating
Metacritic	65/100
Review scores
Source	Rating
Allmusic	3.5/5 stars
The A.V. Club	B−
Cokemachineglow	63%
Los Angeles Times	3/5 stars
NOW Toronto	3/5 stars
The Phoenix	3/4 stars
Pitchfork Media	6.6/10
PopMatters	6/10 stars
RapReviews	6/10 stars
Slant Magazine	2/5 stars

The album received generally positive reviews from music critics. August Brown of the Los Angeles Times said that although Gucci's "notoriously screwball wordplay takes a back seat to a more sedate menace", his "inimitable rasp is where it should be". David Jeffries of AllMusic complimented the album's removal of "radio-friendly numbers and polish", and praised Drumma Boy's production.

In contrast, Jesse Cataldo of Slant gave the album a more negative review, awarding it 2 out of 5 stars and criticizing Gucci's mediocrity.

== Track listing ==
The Return of Mr. Zone 6 track listing
No.	Title	Writer(s)	Producer(s)	Length
1.	"24 Hours"	Radric Davis; Christopher Gholson	Drumma Boy	4:35
2.	"Mouth Full of Golds" (featuring Birdman)	Davis; Bryan Williams; Gholson	Drumma Boy	4:10
3.	"This Is What I Do" (featuring Waka Flocka Flame and OJ da Juiceman)	Davis; Juaquin Malphurs; Otis Williams Jr.; Gholson	Drumma Boy	4:46
4.	"Reckless" (featuring Cap and Chill Will)	Davis; D. Winters; Willie Pritchard; Gholson	Drumma Boy	4:28
5.	"Shout Out to My Set" (featuring Wooh da Kid)	Davis; Nyquan Malphurs; Joshua Luellen	Southside	4:00
6.	"I Don't Love Her" (featuring Rocko and Webbie)	Davis; Rodney Hill Jr.; Webster Gradney Jr.; Xavier Dotson	Zaytoven	4:04
7.	"Better Baby"	Davis; Gholson	Drumma Boy	3:32
8.	"Brinks" (featuring Master P)	Davis; Percy Miller; Gholson	Drumma Boy	3:28
9.	"Pretty Bitches" (featuring Wale)	Davis; Olubowale Akintimehin; Gholson	Drumma Boy	4:49
10.	"Pancakes" (featuring Waka Flocka Flame and 8Ball)	Davis; J. Malphurs; Premro Smith; Gholson	Drumma Boy	4:19
11.	"Hell Yeah" (featuring Slim Dunkin)	Davis; Mario Hamilton; Gholson	Drumma Boy	3:45
12.	"My Year"	Davis; Gholson	Drumma Boy	3:53
13.	"Trick or Treat" (featuring Slim Dunkin, Wooh da Kid and Waka Flocka Flame)	Davis; Hamilton; N. Malphurs; J. Malphurs; Gholson	Drumma Boy	6:21
Total length:				56:10

== Charts ==
Chart (2011)	Peak position
US Billboard 200	18
US Top R&B/Hip-Hop Albums (Billboard)	8
US Top Rap Albums (Billboard)	2
