= USA (Unconformable Social Amputees) =

Studio album by Saint Dog
- Released: May 16, 2006
- Recorded: 2006
- Genre: Hip hop
- Length: 1:03:20
- Label: Suburban Noize Records
- Producer: Kevin Zinger, Daddy X

Saint Dog chronology
Ghetto Guide (2004)	USA (Unconformable Social Amputees) (2006)	Bozo (2019)

USA (Unconformable Social Amputees) is the second solo studio album by American rapper Saint Dog from the Kottonmouth Kings. It was released on May 16, 2006, by Suburban Noize Records.

== Track listing ==
#	Title	Guest Artist	Time
1	Subnoize Anthem	Daddy X	4:48
2	Oompa Loompa		3:19
3	Pussy Poppin'	DJ Bobby B	3:43
4	Paper Chase	Big Hoss	3:21
5	Hip Hop Punk Rock (Gangsta Lean)	Chucky Styles, Big Hoss	3:33
6	Their Lies	Big Hoss	1:54
7	Reaper	Chucky Styles, Big Hoss	4:13
8	When I Grow Up	Big Hoss, Maxon Price	4:31
9	Da Game	BJ "The Pimp" Smith	4:07
10	Wanna Live		3:10
11	Get Gone	The Dirtball, Daddy X	4:16
12	Throw It Up	The Dirtball	3:54
13	Ha Ha	Big Hoss, Daddy X	3:48
14	How Many	Judge D	3:58
15	Down 4 Whatever	Pakelika	3:25
16	Inside My Head	Big Hoss	3:28
17	Stand Up	Big Hoss	3:26
18	Friends Like You	Big Hoss	1:29
