= Hard to Kill (Gucci Mane album) =

Studio album by Gucci Mane
- Released: October 24, 2006
- Studio: Patchwerk Studio; Big Cat Studios; Eleventh Street Studios
- Genre: Southern hip-hop; trap; gangsta rap
- Length: 62:42
- Label: Big Cat
- Producer: Marlon "Big Cat" Rowe (exec.); Melvin "Mel Man" Breeden (exec.); Cyber Sapp; Josh Butler; Lyrical Chead George; Nitti; Paul "Why/Not" Roach; Zaytoven

Gucci Mane chronology
Chicken Talk (2006)	Hard to Kill (2006)	Ice Attack (2007)

Singles from Hard to Kill
- 1. "My Chain" Released: June 15, 2006; 2. "Freaky Gurl" Released: September 11, 2007

Hard to Kill is the second studio album by American rapper Gucci Mane. It was released on October 24, 2006, via Big Cat Records and Tommy Boy Records. Production was mainly handled by Zaytoven, except for four tracks which were produced by Cyber Sapp, Nitti, Josh Butler, Chead George and Paul Roach. The album features guest appearances from Black Magic, Mac Bre-Z, Gangsta Boo, Jason Caesar, La Chat and Young Snead.

The album was supported by the singles "My Chain" released on June 15, 2006, and the second single "Freaky Gurl", which was sent to radio on September 11, 2007.

== Critical reception ==
The album received mixed reviews. Paul Cantor of XXL said that although the album's guest appearances help "break the monotony", it was "a laborious listen".

== Track listing ==
No.	Title	Producer(s)	Length
1.	"Intro"		0:38
2.	"Street Ni$$as"	Zaytoven	4:43
3.	"My Chain" (featuring Black Magic)	Zaytoven	3:51
4.	"Hold Dat Thought"	Zaytoven	5:23
5.	"Freaky Gurl"	Cyber Sapp	3:45
6.	"Pillz" (featuring Mac Bree-Z)	Zaytoven	5:11
7.	"Go Head" (featuring Mac Bree-Z)	Nitti	4:58
8.	"Trap Starz"	Zaytoven	4:41
9.	"Drive Fast" (featuring Jason Caesar)	Zaytoven	4:00
10.	"Stick Em Up" (featuring La Chat)	Zaytoven	4:40
11.	"Everybody Know Me"	Lyrical Chead George; Paul "Why/Not" Roach	3:43
12.	"We Live This" (featuring Black Magic and Young Snead)	Josh Butler	4:55
13.	"Trap Gurl" (featuring Gangsta Boo)	Zaytoven	4:56
14.	"Alley Cat"	Zaytoven	3:28
15.	"Blow Pop"	Zaytoven	3:40
16.	"Big Cat (Laflare)"	Zaytoven	3:48
17.	"Outro"		0:17
Total length:			1:06:34

== Charts ==
Chart (2006)	Peak position
US Billboard 200	76
US Top R&B/Hip-Hop Albums (Billboard)	13
US Top Rap Albums (Billboard)	6
US Independent Albums (Billboard)	4
