= Zaytoven =

American record producer (born 1980)

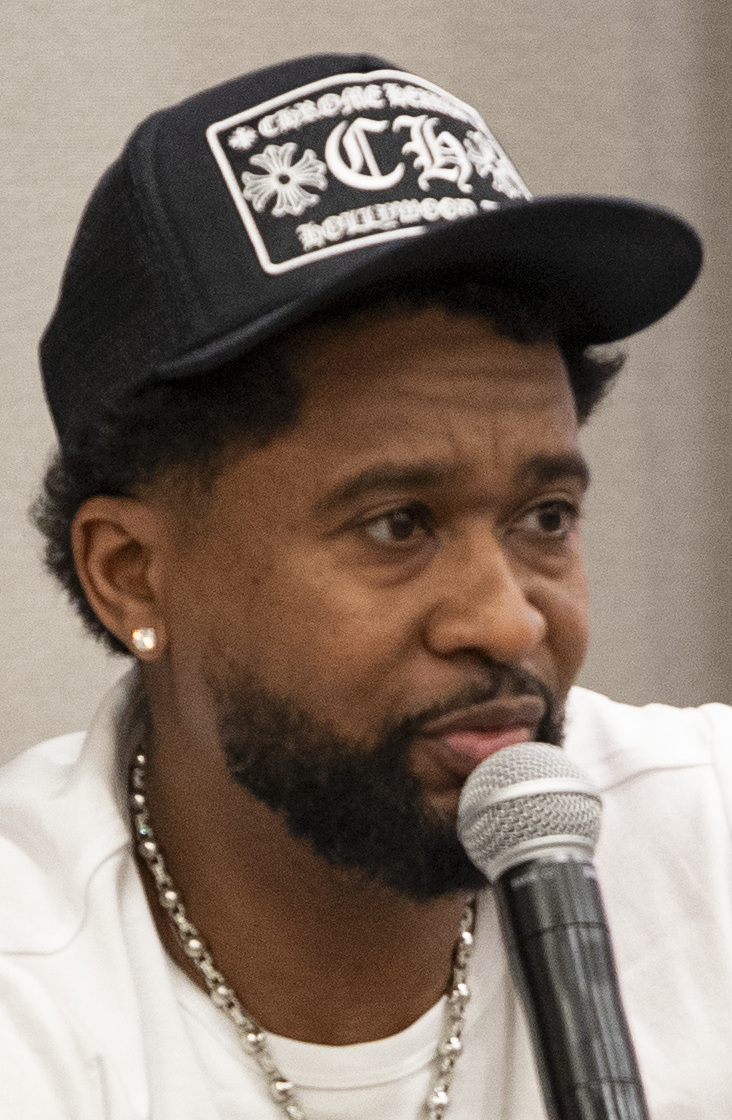
- Zaytoven in 2025

Background information
- Born: Xavier Lamar Dotson; January 12, 1980 (age 46); Frankfurt, West Germany
- Origin: San Francisco, California, U.S.; Atlanta, Georgia, U.S.
- Genres: Southern hip hop; trap; Christian hip-hop; gospel
- Occupations: Record producer; disc jockey; keyboardist; songwriter
- Instruments: Akai MPC; keyboards
- Years active: 1997–present
- Labels: Zaytown; 1017; Familiar Territory; Motown; ONErpm
- Website: zaytovenbeatz.com

Xavier Lamar Dotson (born January 12, 1980), known professionally as Zaytoven, is an American Atlanta-based record producer from San Francisco, California. He has released collaborative projects with artists including Gucci Mane, Usher, Future, Young Dolph, Migos, Lecrae, Lil Yachty, Chief Keef, Young Scooter, B.o.B, Boosie Badazz, Waka Flocka Flame, 21 Savage, Deitrick Haddon and La Fève. He is known for being a pioneer of trap production.

After producing Gucci Mane's 2005 single "Icy", Zaytoven signed with 1017 Records as in-house talent. He was credited on Usher's 2009 single "Papers", which peaked within the Billboard Hot 100's top 40.

== Early life ==
Dotson spent a lot of time at church growing up, as his father was a preacher when not working for the army. He learned to play instruments through the church bands along with his three younger siblings. He gravitated toward playing the piano and organ.

Dotson was introduced to rap in middle school by a friend. He learned to produce music while attending high school in his spare time between school and basketball, Dotson played the keyboard during halftime at his high school football games. While he was performing one day at the game, he met rapper JT the Bigga Figga who liked what he heard, and invited Dotson to his studio, where Dotson had unlimited access to his keyboards. He truly began to utilize his skills as a producer while making beats in JT's studio before he started making a name for himself in Atlanta.

== Career ==
=== Career beginnings ===
Zaytoven started going over to JT the Bigga Figga's studio every day to make beats and learn how to use the equipment. He began to sell beats to JT and went on to collaborate with Bay Area artists such as Messy Marv and E-40 while still in high school. During his senior year in high school, Zaytoven's family moved to Atlanta, Georgia, due to his father's retirement. Zaytoven decided to stay in San Francisco, California, finish his senior year, and continue his producing for local rappers. He realized that he needed a studio of his own where he could produce with his own equipment and work at any time of the day.

Having saved up money from his day job as a barber, Zaytoven began to buy equipment for producing. He would ship this to his parents' house in Atlanta, to which he eventually moved, and set up his own studio there. He enrolled in a local barber college in Atlanta and got a job as a barber to help finance the rest of his studio. While attending barber school, a classmate of his introduced Zaytoven to Gucci Mane, who would become his right-hand man in his career as a producer. Zaytoven and Gucci Mane began to work together every day after meeting each other. Zaytoven said in an interview with Fader that Gucci Mane would call him at 7 a.m. asking if he was ready to start making music for that day. Zaytoven and Gucci Mane spent the majority of the early 2000s making music together and selling mixtapes out of the trunks of their cars in Atlanta. It wasn't until 2005 that the two gained mainstream recognition from their hit song "Icy", with features from Young Jeezy and Boo. This recognition gave Zaytoven's career the boost it needed to take off, landing the hit song "Papers" with Usher in 2010 on Usher's certified platinum album Raymond v. Raymond.

=== Rise to fame ===
Zaytoven's work on Usher's album Raymond v. Raymond earned him a Grammy Award in 2011 and a serious reputation in the hip-hop world. He started to work with more artists as his popularity grew in the Atlanta rap scene. He helped shaped the careers of artists such as OJ da Juiceman, Yung L.A., Yung Ralph, Shop Boyz, Lil Scrappy, Jagged Edge, and Gorilla Zoe.

Zaytoven collaborated with hip hop trio Migos. He produced several tracks on their 2013 mixtape, Y.R.N. (Young Rich Niggas), including the hit track "Versace", which peaked at 53 on the Billboard chart. Zaytoven's collaboration with Migos continued; he helped produce their followup mixtape No Label 2, released on February 25, 2014.

In 2015, Zaytoven provided exclusive production for ten mixtapes, including Future's Beast Mode, released on January 15. He also worked on Future's album DS2, which debuted on July 17.

In July 2016, Zaytoven produced or co-produced seven songs on Gucci Mane's first album since being released from prison, Everybody Looking. In the same month, Lil Uzi Vert's The Perfect LUV Tape was released, containing the Zaytoven-produced songs "Money Mitch" and "SideLine Watching (Hold Up)". In 2017, Zaytoven contributed to projects such as Gucci Mane's Mr. Davis, 21 Savage's Issa Album, Migos' Culture, Moneybagg Yo's Heartless, and Yo Gotti's I Still Am. Zaytoven also released two independent projects, Wake Up & Cook Up and Where Would the Game Be Without Me.

Zaytoven was scheduled to release his debut album Trap Holizay on May 25, 2018, and a collaborative album with Lecrae titled Let the Trap Say Amen on June 22, 2018.

=== Acting career ===
Zaytoven made his acting debut in the 2012 film Birds of a Feather, co-starring with Gucci Mane. The sequel Birds of a Feather 2 was released in 2018.

=== Tracklib ===
In 2018, Zaytoven joined the Creators Advisory Board of Tracklib.

== Discography ==
=== Collaborative albums ===
| Title | Album details | Peak chart positions | | |
| Title | Album details | US | US R&B/HH | NLD |
|---|---|---|---|---|
| Let the Trap Say Amen (with Lecrae) | Released: June 22, 2018; Label: Reach; Format: Digital download, streaming | 49 | 26 | — |
| A (with Usher) | Released: October 12, 2018; Label: RCA; Format: Digital download, streaming | 31 | 19 | 135 |
| Lost Tapes (with B.o.B) | Released: February 18, 2021; Label: Zaytoven Global, LLC; Format: Digital download, streaming | — | — | — |
| Pray For Atlanta (with 1K Phew) | Released: January 19, 2024; Label: Reach; Format: Digital download, streaming | — | — | — |

=== Compilation albums ===
| Title | Album details |
|---|---|
| Zaytoven Presents: Fo15 (with Fo15) | Released: April 15, 2021; Label: Fo15 Empire; Format: Digital download, streaming |

=== Extended plays ===
| Title | Album details |
|---|---|
| GucTiggy (with Gucci Mane) | Released: August 22, 2016; Label: 1017; Format: Digital download |
| Greatest Gift (with Deitrick Haddon) | Released: December 14, 2018; Label: Familiar Territory, Motown; Format: Digital download |
| Drip & Zay (with Kountry Wayne) | Released: October 1, 2021; Label: Zaytoven Global, LLC; Format: Digital download |
| Only One | Released: January 6, 2023; Label: Zaytoven Global, LLC; Format: Digital download |
| 24 the EP (with Damon Fletcher) | Released: June 24, 2023; Label: Damon Fletcher LLC; Format: Digital download |

=== Mixtapes ===
| Title | Mixtape details | Peak chart positions | | | | | |
| Title | Mixtape details | US | US R&B/HH | CAN | FRA | NLD | UK |
|---|---|---|---|---|---|---|---|
| World War 3 (Lean) (with Gucci Mane) | Released: August 12, 2013; Label: 1017, RBC; Format: Digital download, streaming | — | 33 | — | — | — | — |
| Beast Mode (with Future) | Released: January 15, 2015; Label: Freebandz; Format: Digital download, streaming | — | — | — | — | — | — |
| Juggathon (with Young Scooter) | Released: May 27, 2015; Label: Familiar Territory, Black Migo Gang, Freebandz; Format: Digital download, streaming | — | — | — | — | — | — |
| For Trappers Only (with Shy Glizzy) | Released: September 30, 2015; Label: 300 Entertainment, Glizzy Gang; Format: Digital download, streaming | — | — | — | — | — | — |
| Trapping Made It Happen | Released: December 15, 2017; Label: Familiar; Format: Digital download, streaming | — | — | — | — | — | — |
| Trapholizay | Released: May 25, 2018; Label: Familiar Territory, Motown; Format: Digital download, streaming | 78 | 43 | — | — | — | — |
| Beast Mode 2 (with Future) | Released: July 6, 2018; Label: Freebandz, Epic; Format: Digital download, streaming | 3 | 3 | 13 | 130 | 49 | 55 |
| 6Toven (with Foolio) | Released: July 13, 2018; Label: Deeper Than Sound; Format: Digital download, streaming | — | — | — | — | — | — |
| GloToven (with Chief Keef) | Released: March 15, 2019; Label: Glo Gang, RBC; Format: Digital download, streaming | 153 | — | — | — | — | — |
| Camp GloTiggy (with Chief Keef) | Released: May 31, 2019; Label: Glo Gang, RBC; Format: Digital download, streaming | — | — | — | — | — | — |
| Bad Azz Zay (with Boosie Badazz) | Released: September 20, 2019; Label: Bad Azz, Familiar Territory; Format: Digital download, streaming | — | — | — | — | — | — |
| A-Team (with Lil Keed, Lil Gotit, and Lil Yachty) | Released: February 28, 2020; Label: Familiar Territory, Opposition; Format: Digital download, streaming | — | — | — | — | — | — |
| Pack Just Landed Vol. 1 | Released: August 7, 2020; Label: Zaytoven Global, LLC; Format: Digital download, streaming | — | — | — | — | — | — |
| Pack Just Landed Vol. 2 | Released: September 4, 2020; Label: Zaytoven Global, LLC; Format: Digital download, streaming | — | — | — | — | — | — |
| Zaystreet (with Young Scooter) | Released: December 11, 2020; Label: Familiar Territory, Black Migo Gang, Freebandz; Format: Digital download, streaming | — | — | — | — | — | — |
| GrinchToven Stole The Trap | Released: December 25, 2020; Label: Self-released; Format: Digital download, streaming | — | — | — | — | — | — |
| Moetoven (with Moe) | Released: April 23, 2021; Label: Moe Money, Epic; Format: Digital download, streaming | — | — | — | — | — | — |
| Pack Just Landed Vol. 3 | Released: September 7, 2021; Label: Zaytoven Global, LLC; Format: Digital download, streaming | — | — | — | — | — | — |
| Keys To the Streets (with Luh Soldier) | Released: October 22, 2021; Label: Cinematic, Soldier Life; Format: Digital download, streaming | — | — | — | — | — | — |
| GhostToven (with Ghostluvme) | Released: December 17, 2021; Label: High & Mighty Entertainment; Format: Digital download, streaming | — | — | — | — | — | — |
| Streetz Got No Heart | Released: June 24, 2022; Label: Zaytoven Global, LLC; Format: Digital download, streaming | — | — | — | — | — | — |
| Loverz n Friendz | Released: July 22, 2022; Label: Zaytoven Global, LLC; Format: Digital download, streaming | — | — | — | — | — | — |

=== Other charted songs ===
| Title | Year | Peak chart positions | Album |
| Title | Year | US R&B | Album |
|---|---|---|---|
| "Stay at Home" (with Usher featuring Future) | 2018 | 22 | A |

== Production discography ==
=== Charted songs ===
| Title | Year | Peak chart positions | | | Album |
| Title | Year | US | US R&B/HH | US Rap | Album |
|---|---|---|---|---|---|
| "Icy" (Gucci Mane featuring Jeezy and Boo) | 2005 | — (Note: "Icy" did not enter the "Billboard" Hot 100, but peaked at number five on the Bubbling Under Hot 100 Singles chart.) | 46 | 23 | Trap House |
| "Pillz" (Gucci Mane featuring Mac Bre-Z) | 2006 | — | — (Note: "Pillz" did not enter the Hot R&B/Hip-Hop Songs chart, but peaked at number three on the Bubbling Under R&B/Hip-Hop Singles chart.) | — | Hard to Kill, No Pad, No Pencil |
| "I'm a Dog" (Gucci Mane featuring DG Yola) | 2008 | — | — (Note: "I'm a Dog" did not enter the Hot R&B/Hip-Hop Songs chart, but peaked at number eight on the Bubbling Under R&B/Hip-Hop Singles chart.) | — | Chicken Talk 2, Bird Money, The State vs. Radric Davis |
| "Bricks" (Gucci Mane featuring Yo Gotti and Yung Ralph or OJ da Juiceman) | 2008 | — | — (Note: "Bricks" did not enter the Hot R&B/Hip-Hop Songs chart, but peaked at number 19 on the Bubbling Under R&B/Hip-Hop Singles chart.) | — | EA Sportscenter, The State vs. Radric Davis |
| "Make tha Trap Say Aye" (OJ da Juiceman featuring Gucci Mane) | 2008 | — (Note: "Make tha Trap Say Aye" did not enter the "Billboard" Hot 100, but peaked at number eight on the Bubbling Under Hot 100 Singles chart.) | 22 | 13 | The Otha Side of the Trap |
| "I Don't Love Her" (Gucci Mane featuring Rocko and Webbie) | 2011 | — | — (Note: "I Don't Love Her" did not enter the Hot R&B/Hip-Hop Songs chart, but peaked at number two on the Bubbling Under R&B/Hip-Hop Singles chart.) | — | The Return of Mr. Zone 6 |
| "Versace" (Migos) | 2013 | 99 | 31 | 23 | Y.R.N. (Young Rich Niggas) |
| "3500" (Travis Scott featuring Future and 2 Chainz) | 2015 | 82 | 25 | 18 | Rodeo |
| "Guwop Home" (Gucci Mane featuring Young Thug) | 2016 | — (Note: "Guwop Home" did not enter the "Billboard" Hot 100, but peaked at number 23 on the Bubbling Under Hot 100 Singles chart.) | — (Note: "Guwop Home" did not enter the Hot R&B/Hip-Hop Songs chart, but peaked at number one on the Bubbling Under R&B/Hip-Hop Singles chart.) | — | Everybody Looking |
| "No Sleep (Intro)" (Gucci Mane) | 2016 | — | — (Note: "No Sleep (Intro)" did not enter the Hot R&B/Hip-Hop Songs chart, but peaked at number four on the Bubbling Under R&B/Hip-Hop Singles chart.) | — | Everybody Looking |
| "Waybach" (Gucci Mane) | 2016 | — | — (Note: "Waybach" did not enter the Hot R&B/Hip-Hop Songs chart, but peaked at number eight on the Bubbling Under R&B/Hip-Hop Singles chart.) | — | Everybody Looking |
| "Too Much Sauce" (DJ Esco featuring Future and Lil Uzi Vert) | 2016 | 50 | 21 | 15 | Project E.T. |
| "Used to This" (Future featuring Drake) | 2016 | 14 | 5 | 4 | Future |
| "St. Brick Intro" (Gucci Mane) | 2016 | — (Note: "St. Brick Intro" did not enter the "Billboard" Hot 100, but peaked at number seven on the Bubbling Under Hot 100 Singles chart.) | — (Note: "St. Brick Intro" did not enter the Hot R&B/Hip-Hop Songs chart, but peaked at number two on the Bubbling Under R&B/Hip-Hop Singles chart.) | — | The Return of East Atlanta Santa |
| "What the Price" (Migos) | 2017 | — (Note: "What the Price" did not enter the Billboard Hot 100, but peaked at number two on the Bubbling Under Hot 100 Singles chart.) | 41 | — | Culture |
| "Get Right Witcha" (Migos) | 2017 | 72 | 29 | 19 | Culture |
| "Big on Big" (Migos) | 2017 | — (Note: "Big on Big" did not enter the Billboard Hot 100, but peaked at number eight on the Bubbling Under Hot 100 Singles chart.) | 47 | — | Culture |
| "Brown Paper Bag" (Migos) | 2017 | — (Note: "Brown Paper Bag" did not enter the Billboard Hot 100, but peaked at number one on the Bubbling Under Hot 100 Singles chart.) | 40 | — | Culture |
| "When I Was Broke" (Future) | 2017 | — (Note: "When I Was Broke" did not enter the Billboard Hot 100, but peaked at number 22 on the Bubbling Under Hot 100 Singles chart.) | — (Note: "When I Was Broke" did not enter the Hot R&B/Hip-Hop Songs chart, but peaked at number six on the Bubbling Under R&B/Hip-Hop Singles chart.) | — | Future |
| "Feds Did a Sweep" (Future) | 2017 | — | — (Note: "Feds Did a Sweep" did not enter the Hot R&B/Hip-Hop Songs chart, but peaked at number seven on the Bubbling Under R&B/Hip-Hop Singles chart.) | — | Future |
| "Famous" (21 Savage) | 2017 | 94 | 41 | — | Issa Album |
| "Nothin New" (21 Savage) | 2017 | — (Note: "Nothin New" did not enter the Billboard Hot 100, but peaked at number nine on the Bubbling Under Hot 100 Singles chart.) | — (Note: "Nothin New" did not enter the Hot R&B/Hip-Hop Songs chart, but peaked at number one on the Bubbling Under R&B/Hip-Hop Singles chart.) | — | Issa Album |
| "Wifi Lit" (Future) | 2018 | 53 | 26 | 23 | Beast Mode 2 |
| "31 Days" (Future) | 2018 | 64 | 34 | — | Beast Mode 2 |
| "Cuddle My Wrist" (Future) | 2018 | 70 | 38 | — | Beast Mode 2 |
| "Racks Blue" (Future) | 2018 | 76 | 42 | — | Beast Mode 2 |
| "Red Light" (Future) | 2018 | — (Note: "Red Light" did not enter the Billboard Hot 100, but peaked at number six on the Bubbling Under Hot 100 Singles chart.) | — (Note: "Red Light" did not enter the Hot R&B/Hip-Hop Songs chart, but peaked at number three on the Bubbling Under R&B/Hip-Hop Singles chart.) | — | Beast Mode 2 |
| "Some More" (Future) | 2018 | — (Note: "Some More" did not enter the Billboard Hot 100, but peaked at number seven on the Bubbling Under Hot 100 Singles chart.) | — (Note: "Some More" did not enter the Hot R&B/Hip-Hop Songs chart, but peaked at number four on the Bubbling Under R&B/Hip-Hop Singles chart.) | — | Beast Mode 2 |
| "Doh Doh" (Future featuring Young Scooter) | 2018 | — (Note: "Doh Doh" did not enter the Billboard Hot 100, but peaked at number eleven on the Bubbling Under Hot 100 Singles chart.) | — (Note: "Doh Doh" did not enter the Hot R&B/Hip-Hop Songs chart, but peaked at number six on the Bubbling Under R&B/Hip-Hop Singles chart.) | — | Beast Mode 2 |
| "When I Think About It" (Future) | 2018 | — (Note: "When I Think About It" did not enter the Billboard Hot 100, but peaked at number fifteen on the Bubbling Under Hot 100 Singles chart.) | — (Note: "When I Think About It" did not enter the Hot R&B/Hip-Hop Songs chart, but peaked at number seven on the Bubbling Under R&B/Hip-Hop Singles chart.) | — | Beast Mode 2 |
| "Hate the Real Me" (Future) | 2018 | — (Note: "Hate the Real Me" did not enter the Billboard Hot 100, but peaked at number 24 on the Bubbling Under Hot 100 Singles chart.) | — | — | Beast Mode 2 |
| "Problems" (Lil Wayne) | 2018 | 57 | 33 | — | Tha Carter V |
| "Moana" (G-Eazy and Jack Harlow) | 2020 | — (Note: "Moana" did not chart on the Billboard Hot 100, but did peak at number 23 on the Bubbling Under Hot 100 chart.) | — | — | Non-album single |
| "RIP Luv" (21 Savage and Metro Boomin) | 2020 | 76 | 32 | — | Savage Mode II |
| "Real Baby Pluto" (Future and Lil Uzi Vert) | 2020 | 54 | 17 | 16 | Pluto × Baby Pluto |
| "Million Dollar Play" (Future and Lil Uzi Vert) | 2020 | 67 | 25 | 23 | Pluto × Baby Pluto |
| "Roadrunner" (Migos) | 2021 | — (Note: "Roadrunner" did not enter the Billboard Hot 100, but peaked at number sixteen on the Bubbling Under Hot 100 Singles chart.) | — | — | Culture III |
| "Better Believe" (Belly, The Weeknd, and Young Thug) | 2021 | 88 | 31 | 25 | See You Next Wednesday |

== Filmography ==
| Year | Film | Role |
|---|---|---|
| 2012 | Birds of a Feather | Himself |
| 2013 | Weed Man | Himself |
| 2018 | Birds of a Feather 2 | Himself |
