= Big Cat Records (U.S. record label) =

American hip-hop record label

Big Cat Records is an Atlanta-based hip-hop record label distributed by Tommy Boy Records. The label was founded in 1999 by Melvin "Mel-Man" Breeden and Marlon "Big Cat" Rowe. Big Cat Records is best known for being the first record label of Gucci Mane before he had his contract bought out by Atlantic Records. Other artists with releases on Big Cat include Yung Ralph, Pretty Ricky, Khia, Buju Banton, Maceo, Black Magic, Rasheeda, and Freekey Zekey.
