= Coochie =

Coochie may refer to:

- Coochee (alternative spelling), a slang descriptor used in relation to a belly dance
  - Hoochie coochie, a catch-all term to describe several sexually provocative belly dance-like dances
- The town on Coochiemudlo Island, a small island in Moreton Bay, near Brisbane, Queensland, Australia
- Slang word for vagina
