= Pissy (song) =

2023 single by Gucci Mane featuring Roddy Ricch and Nardo Wick

Single by Gucci Mane featuring Roddy Ricch and Nardo Wick

from the album Breath of Fresh Air
- Released: May 5, 2023
- Length: 3:38
- Label: 1017; Atlantic
- Songwriters: Radric Davis; Rodrick Moore, Jr.; Horace Walls III; Avo No Sleep; Paul Penso; Will No Sleep
- Producers: Avo No Sleep; Koncept P; Will No Sleep

Gucci Mane singles chronology
"06 Gucci" (2023)	"Pissy" (2023)	"Bluffin" (2023)

Roddy Ricch singles chronology
"I Remember" (2023)	"Pissy" (2023)

Nardo Wick singles chronology
"Hot Boy" (2023)	"Pissy" (2023)	"Gun Class II" (2023)

Music video
- "Pissy" on YouTube

"Pissy" is a song by American rapper Gucci Mane featuring American rappers Roddy Ricch and Nardo Wick. It was released on May 5, 2023, as the third single from his sixteenth studio album Breath of Fresh Air. It was produced by Avo No Sleep, Koncept P, and Will No Sleep.

== Composition ==
The song contains a melodic hook performed by Roddy Ricch, who also performs the first verse. Gucci Mane and Nardo Wick respectively perform the second and third verses. The three rap about their luxurious lifestyles, including extravagant possessions and women, and "other vices".

== Critical reception ==
Noah Grant of HotNewHipHop praised the song, writing, "As some listeners have pointed out, Roddy Ricch carries the song. It may technically be Gucci Mane's song, but Roddy really delivers the goods. In fact, listening to it without knowing what it is, one could be forgiven for thinking Gucci is the feature. Regardless, it's a banger."

== Music video ==
The music video was directed by 20KVisuals and released alongside the single. It features a range of yellow items (as a reference to Gucci Mane's song "Lemonade") such as caution tape, sports cars, and the makeup and bikinis worn by models in the clip. The rappers are seen showing off their jewelry, including diamonds, Cuban chains, large pendants and rings. Gucci Mane also cruises in a car.

== Charts ==
Chart performance for "Pissy"
Chart (2023)	Peak position
US Bubbling Under Hot 100 (Billboard)	15
US Hot R&B/Hip-Hop Songs (Billboard)	37
