= Melvin Breeden =

American songwriter

Melvin "Mel Man" Breeden
- Born: Melvin Breeden; Norfolk, Virginia, U.S.
- Other names: Birdman; Mel-Man
- Occupations: Record executive; record producer
- Years active: 1995–present
- Labels: Big Cat; Radar Live
- Website: twitter.com/melmanmusic

Melvin Breeden, also known by his stage name Mel-Man, is an American record executive from Norfolk, Virginia. With Marlon "Big Cat" Rowe, he co-founded the independent record label Big Cat Records in 1999. Having signed hip hop artists such as Gucci Mane, Rasheeda and Khia, entertainment magazine Billboard named the label one of the Top Rap Labels of 2005.

Breeden served as executive producer for Atlanta-based rapper Gucci Mane's first three studio albums, before his contract was bought out by Atlantic Records. Mane was upset with Big Cat Records following the release of his final album with the label, Murder Was The Case (2009), although Breeden and Mane made amends the following year.

== Credits ==
=== Executive producer ===
- Freak Nasty – Da Dip (1997)
- Freak Nasty – Down Low (1998)
- Cherrelle – The Right Time (1999)
- Buju Banton – Toppa Di Top (2002)
- Various Artists – 504 va 404 (2004)
- Various Artists – Street Certified (2005)
- Rasheeda – GA Peach (2006)
- Gucci Mane – Trap House (2005)
- MACEO – Straight Out Da Pot (2006)
- Gucci Mane – Hard To Kill (2006)
- Gucci Mane – Trap-A-Thon (2007)
- Gucci Mane – Hood Classics (2008)
- Gucci Mane – Bird Money (2009)
- Khia – Nasti Muzik (2008)
- Gucci Mane – Murder Was The Case (2009)
- Canton Jones – Worship Mode (2017)
- Canton Jones – GREATNESS (2018)
- LAIKA – Sad Girl (2020)
- TE-RAYE – Mannequin (2021)
- Chrisette Michele – Hallelujah (single) (2024)

=== Production credits ===
- Khia – Nasti Muzik
- Gucci Mane – Murder Was The Case
