= Weakest Link (song) =

Song by Chris Brown
- Released: April 19, 2024
- Genre: Hip hop; trap
- Length: 2:28
- Songwriter: Chris Brown
- Producers: Orsix; Neverodd; KXVI; Leo Son

Audio video
- "Weakest Link" on YouTube

"Weakest Link" is a diss track by American singer-songwriter and rapper Chris Brown, released on YouTube and Twitter on April 19, 2024. The song responds to Quavo's diss track "Tender," released on April 11, 2024, which itself was a response to Brown's diss aimed at Quavo in the song "Freak" from the deluxe edition of his eleventh studio album, 11:11 (2023), also released on April 11, 2024. Written by Brown, "Weakest Link" was produced by Orsix, Neverodd, KXVI and Leo Son.

== Background ==
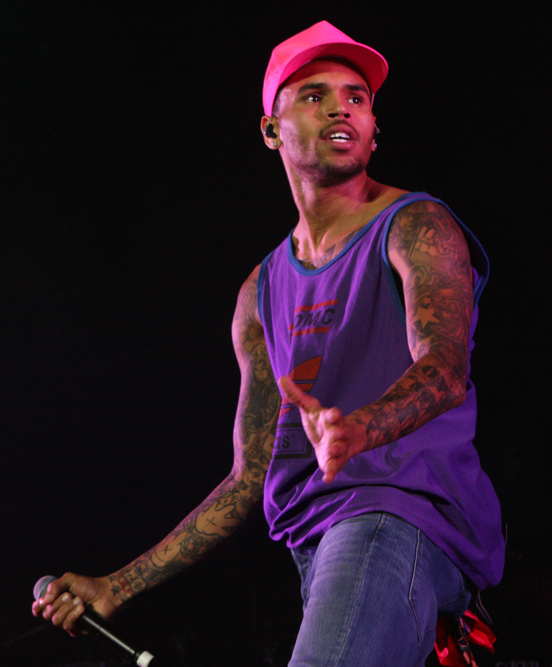
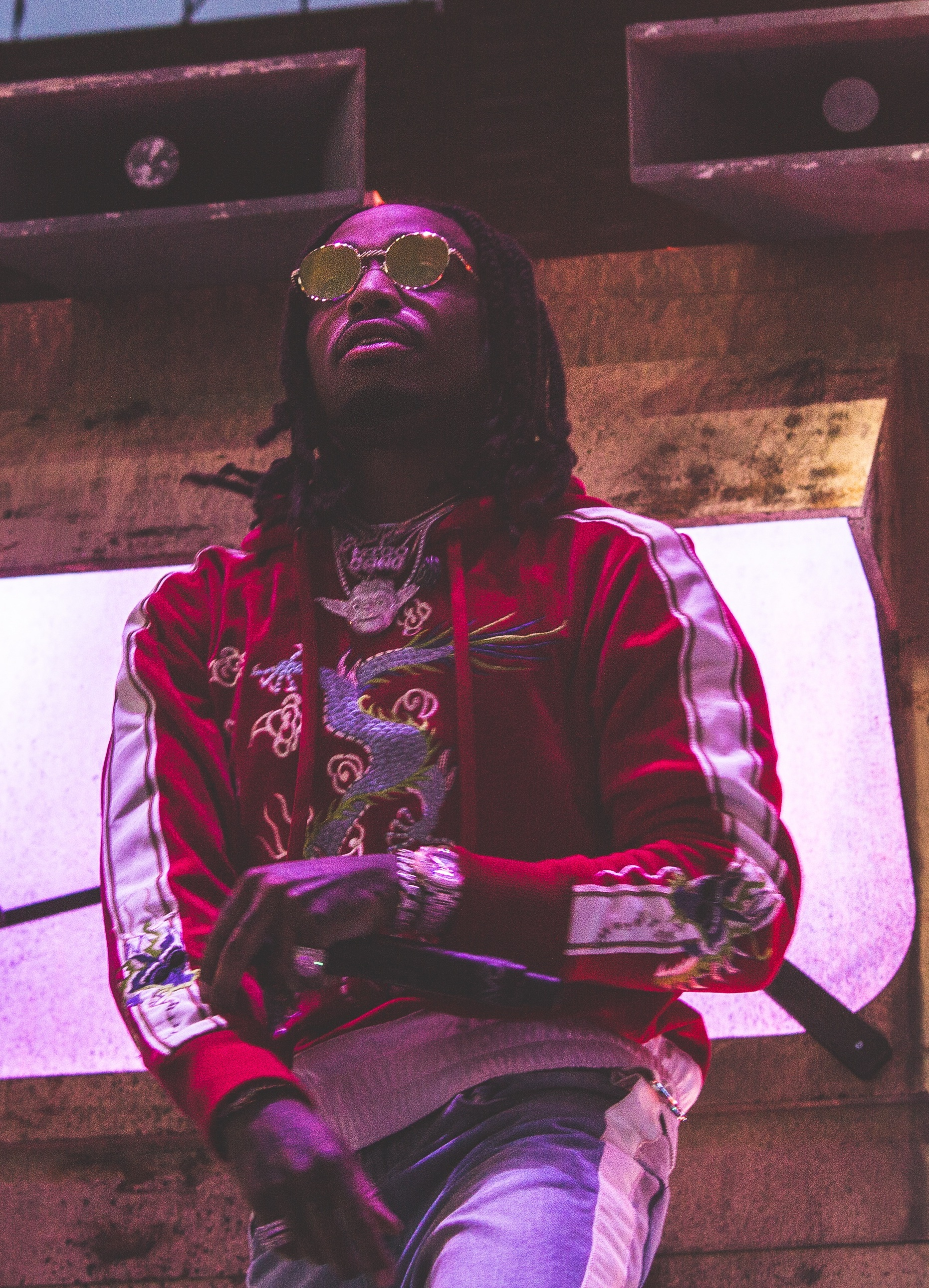
Chris Brown (left) and Quavo (right), had a personal and professional relationship prior to the beginning of their feud in 2017.

On the debut studio album by Quavo's hip hop group Migos, titled Yung Rich Nation (2015), Chris Brown was the only artist featured, alongside Young Thug. Brown and Quavo then continued their personal and professional relationship, collaborating on several other songs, including the singer's track "Whippin’" (2016), contained in his mixtape Before the Trap: Nights in Tarzana, and French Montana's single "Moses" (2015). In 2016, Brown also previewed another collaboration titled "Who This", supposed to be included on his eighth studio album, Heartbreak on a Full Moon (2017), but the track ended up never being released, with speculations suggesting the beginning of their feud as the motive.

Following the release of Migos' commercial breakout album Culture (2017), Brown complimented the group: "I just want to shout out y'all. Y'all my real friends and brothers," Brown said at the time. "I bought your album three times. I spent my own money and shit. I'm proud of you niggas. I will never hate on you niggas." However, three months later, the feud between the two sparked when Quavo started dating the singer's ex-girlfriend Karrueche Tran. The situation escalated into a physical fight between the artists' crews at the 2017 BET Awards. The following years Brown and some Migos members sporadically made offensive comments aimed at each other, expressing their hatred.

During 2024 Paris Fashion Week, Chris Brown and Quavo found themselves sitting next to each other, with media outlets speculating a reconciliation between the two. Brown immediately denied it, stating: “Can't pick who you sit by. Fuck all that growth shit. Nigga not finna fumble my bag for little niggas.” On April 11, 2024, Brown released the deluxe edition of his eleventh studio album 11:11, directly dissing Quavo on the track "Freak", featuring Lil Wayne, Joyner Lucas and Tee Grizzley: “Sippin’ that 1942 ‘cause I don’t do no Quavo / Freak bitch, she like Casamigos, not the Migos”. Quavo responded the following day with "Tender", a diss track aimed at Brown, where he mocks the singer for his domestic violence case with Barbadian singer Rihanna and his rumored drug use, leading Brown to respond the following week with the release of "Weakest Link".

== Composition ==
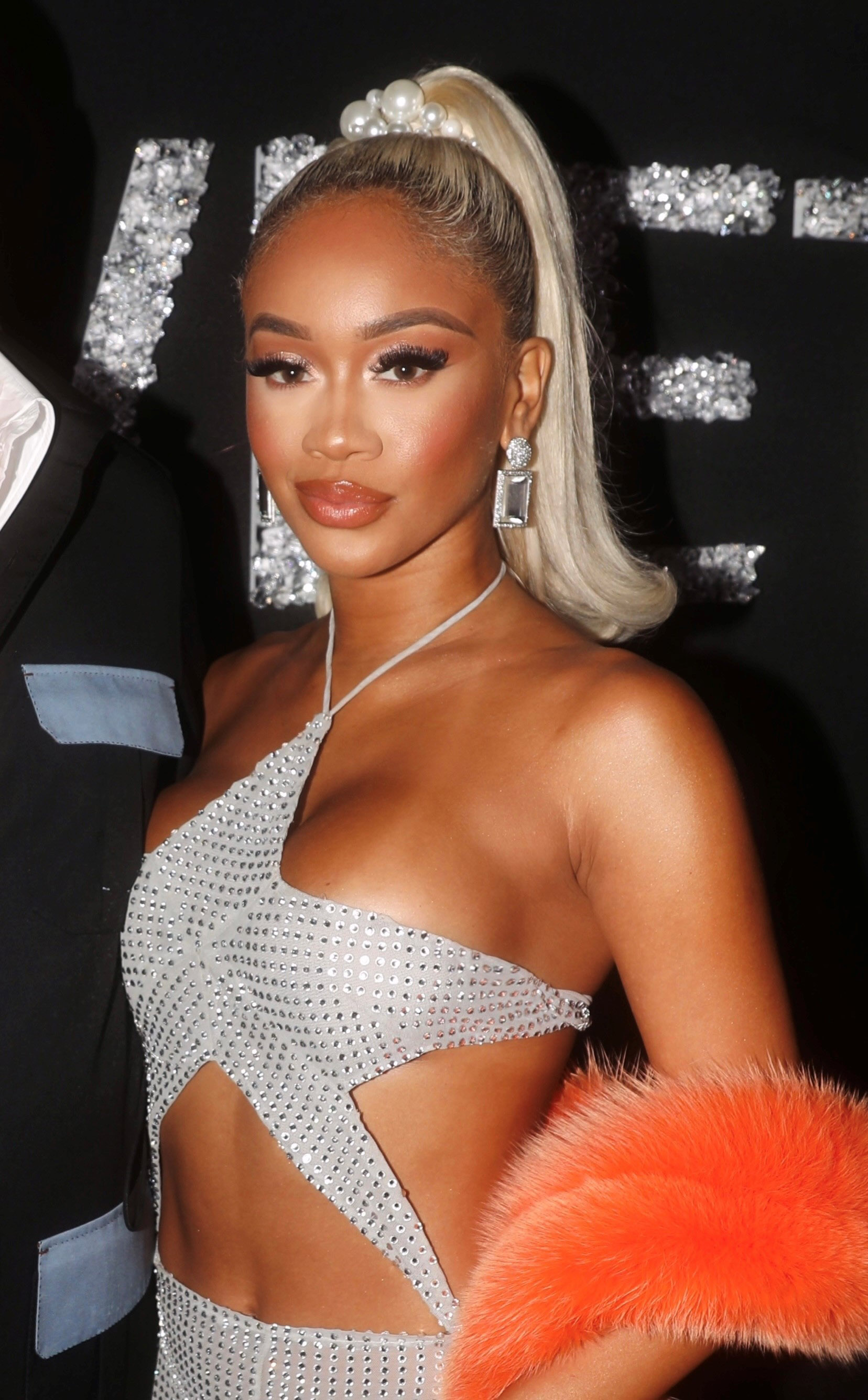
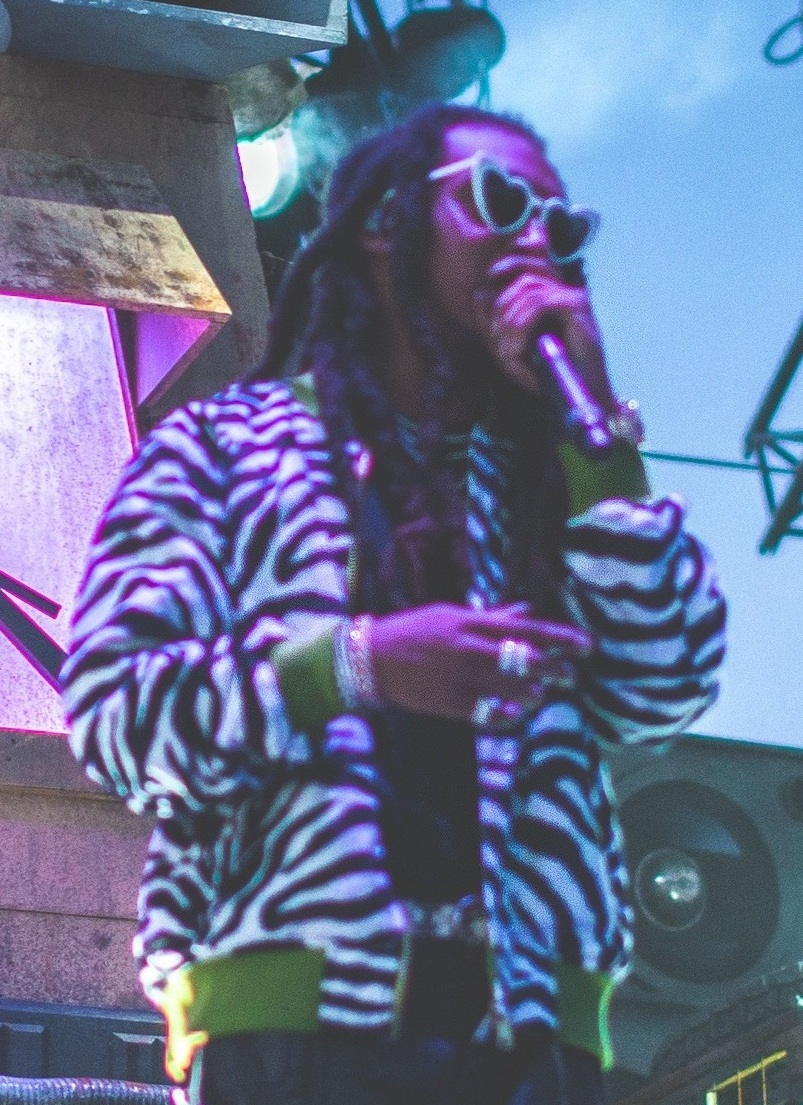
Chris Brown on "Weakest Link" revealed his sexual relationship with Quavo's ex-girlfriend Saweetie (left), while also suggesting that people wished Quavo had died instead of his nephew and group mate Takeoff (right).

"Weakest Link" is a diss song aimed at American trap artist Quavo. The track starts with a quote from the 1973 movie, The Mack, then followed by a private voice message to Chris Brown sent by Quavo were the rapper asks him not to fight. Lyrically, Chris Brown downplays Quavo’s moniker “Huncho”, declaring him as the "weakest" member of his rap group Migos. He continues revealing that he had a sexual relationship with female rapper Saweetie while she was dating Quavo. Brown then addresses the rapper mocking him over his 2009 assault of Rihanna, bringing up Quavo’s own domestic violence incident with the aforementioned Saweetie that was caught on camera in an elevator. Towards the end of the song, Brown raps that people had supposedly wished that Quavo had been murdered instead of his nephew and group mate Takeoff.

In the song's intro and outro Brown interpolates the chorus from Nardo Wick's 2021 song "Who Want Smoke?".

== Critical reception ==
"Weakest Link" received critical acclaim, with praise directed to Brown's rapping and the diss track's lyrical content. Trent Fitzgerald of XXL Magazine stated that “Chris Brown Goes at Quavo’s Throat on ‘Weakest Link’ (...) the bombastic song features [Chris Brown] spitting razor-sharp bars at the Migos member”. Sha Be Allah of The Source said that the diss track “finds Chris Brown taking his feud with the former Migos member to another level.” Writing for Vibe, Amber Corrine commented that “As the 34-year-old is undeniably one of the most talented, multifaceted stars of today, the R&B heartthrob becomes a different kind of beast when he’s spitting.” Revolt said that the track finds the singer “moving full speed ahead as he continues to flex his rapping chops with another round of lyrics aimed at Quavo”. HipHopDX praised Brown's rapping on the track, adding that the singer "has taken his disdain for Quavo to a whole different level with the release of ["Weakest Link"], on which he takes some deeply personal shots at his adversary". Jaelani Turner-Williams of Complex called the diss song “shocking”, describing how the singer “fired more lethal shots at Quavo on his new track, concerning fans about the possibility of their beef getting physical.” HotNewHipHop praised it as a “solid diss”, with Brown “establishing a level of ferocity that the beef previously lacked”.

== Response ==
On April 22, 2024, 3 days after "Weakest Link" was released, Quavo responded with the diss "Over Hoes & Bitches (OHB)", which features vocals from Takeoff. The title refers to Brown's rap crew "Original Hood Bosses" whom he mentions in the song; he also brings up Brown's 2009 felony assault of Rihanna as he alluded to "Tender". Brown would respond via Instagram stories, mocking the diss and claiming it doesn't warrant a response.

== See also ==
- List of notable diss tracks
