= Trap-A-Thon =

Studio album by Gucci Mane
- Released: September 25, 2007
- Recorded: 2005–06
- Genre: Southern hip-hop; trap
- Length: 52:29
- Label: Big Cat
- Producer: Marlon "Big Cat" Rowe (exec.); Melvin "Mel Man" Breeden (exec.); Cyber Sapp; G-Fresh; Low; Raw Beats; Reefa; Slim Major; Zaytoven; Big Cat Productions

Gucci Mane chronology
Bird Flu (2007)	Trap-A-Thon (2007)	No Pad No Pencil (2007)

Singles from Trap-A-Thon
- 1. "Freaky Gurl" Released: September 11, 2007; 2. "Aw Man" Released: October 3, 2007

Trap-A-Thon is an unofficial 16-track album by American rapper and music executive Gucci Mane. It was released on September 25, 2007 by Big Cat Records with distribution via Tommy Boy Entertainment with no actual involvement from Gucci Mane. Production was handled by Zaytoven, Cyber Sapp, G-Fresh, Slim Major, Reefa, Raw Beats and Low. The album features guest appearances from Big Tank, Black Magic, Young Snead, .45, Khia, Maceo and Yatta Mann. It includes skits by Big Cat himself and some leaks they had in the vault.

== Critical reception ==
AllMusic stated that the album had "skull-rattling beats and rhymes spit with a knowing authority", and called it "another steady roller for fans of the Dirty South style".

== Commercial performance ==
Trap-A-Thon debuted at number 69 on the US Billboard 200 chart, selling 12,000 copies in its first week.

== Track listing ==
#	Title	Producer(s)	Featured guest(s)	Length
1	"Big Cat (Intro)"			0:37
2	"Bling Bling"	Zaytoven	Big Tank	4:29
3	"Re-Up"	G-Fresh	Yatta Mann	5:10
4	"Big Cat's Home"			2:21
5	"Freaky Gurl"	Cyber Sapp		3:48
6	"What They Do"	Slim Major	Young Snead; Khia	3:11
7	"Aw-Man"	Zaytoven	.45; Yatta Mann	4:02
8	"Good News & Bad News"			0:43
9	"Choppa Shoppin'"	Big Cat Productions	Young Snead; Black Magic	3:20
10	"Bad Guys"	Reefa	Black Magic	4:43
11	"Pillz (Remix)"	Zaytoven	Big Tank	4:57
12	"Spanish Plug"	Raw Beats		4:23
13	"Product"	Low	Yatta Mann; Black Magic	3:06
14	"Bosses Speak"			2:14
15	"Freaky Gurl (Remix)"	Cyber Sapp	Maceo	3:35
16	"2 Screws Loose"	Big Cat Productions	Black Magic	2:34

== Charts ==
Chart (2007)	Peak position
US Billboard 200	69
US Top R&B/Hip-Hop Albums (Billboard)	9
US Top Rap Albums (Billboard)	4
US Independent Albums (Billboard)	7
