= King Snipe =

2023 single by Gucci Mane and Kodak Black

Single by Gucci Mane and Kodak Black

from the album Breath of Fresh Air
- Released: January 13, 2023
- Genre: Trap
- Length: 3:34
- Label: 1017; Atlantic
- Songwriters: Radric Davis; Bill Kapri; Tony Son; Fourteen Hongmahasak
- Producers: Richie Souf; Fourteen

Gucci Mane singles chronology
| "Dawg" (2022) | "King Snipe" (2023) | "06 Gucci" (2023) |

Kodak Black singles chronology
| "Wasted" (2023) | "King Snipe" (2023) | "What It Is (Block Boy)" (2023) |

Music video
- "King Snipe" on YouTube

"King Snipe" is a song by American rappers Gucci Mane and Kodak Black. It was released on January 13, 2023 with an accompanying music video as the lead single from the former's sixteenth studio album Breath of Fresh Air. It was written alongside producers Richie Souf and Fourteen.

== Background ==
Gucci Mane teased the collaboration on social media with footage of Kodak Black dancing to the song during a studio session.

== Composition ==
The song features the "distinct trappy sound" of Kodak Black, who performs the first and third verses with a triumphant sound. Gucci Mane's performs the second verse and his performance has been regarded as reminiscent of the style in his early mixtapes.

== Music video ==
The music video finds the rappers partying at night in a club, where they perform in front of a "purple-lit" crowd of fans. They also hang out in the parking lot in front of "flashy" cars and spend time in a recording studio.

== Charts ==
Chart performance for "King Snipe"
| Chart (2023) | Peak position |
|---|---|
| US Billboard Hot 100 | 100 |
| US Hot R&B/Hip-Hop Songs (Billboard) | 39 |
