= Back to the Trap House =

Studio album by Gucci Mane
- Released: December 11, 2007
- Genre: Hip-hop; gangsta rap; trap
- Length: 56:51
- Label: So Icey; Czar; Asylum; Atlantic
- Producer: Zaytoven; Shawty Redd; Nitti; Fatboi; All Star; Polow da Don; Cyber Sapp; Butta; Hit-Boy; Rio the Superproducer; Frado; Arizona Slim; The SupaSonics; Reefa

Gucci Mane chronology
Guapaholics (2007)	Back to the Trap House (2007)	Guapaholics (2007)

Singles from Back To The Trap House
- 1. "Bird Flu" Released: May 2007

Professional ratings
Review scores
Source	Rating
RapReviews	(5/10)

Back to the Trap House is the fourth studio album by American rapper Gucci Mane. It was released on December 11, 2007 through So Icey Entertainment and Czar Entertainment; with distribution via Asylum Records and Atlantic Records.

== Critical reception ==
The album received mixed reviews from critics. Jordan Sargent of PopMatters gave the album a rating of 8 out of 10 and called it "genuinely fun" and "excellent".

In contrast, Andres Tardio of HipHopDX gave the album an extremely negative review, awarding it 1 out of 5 stars and stating that it "fails to provide much in terms of great music for new listeners". He also stated that Gucci "sleepwalks his way through the album, lacking a tremendous amount of lyrical inspiration and overall energy".

== Track listing ==
No.	Title	Producer(s)	Length
1.	"Freaky Gurl (Remix)" (featuring Lil' Kim and Ludacris)	Cyber Sapp	4:42
2.	"16 Fever"	Reefa	4:17
3.	"15 Minutes Past the Diamond"	Zaytoven	4:12
4.	"I Know Why" (featuring Pimp C, Rich Boy and Blaze-1)	Butta; Hit-Boy; Polow da Don (co.); Rio the Superproducer (co.)	3:59
5.	"I Might Be" (featuring Shawnna and Game)	Zaytoven	4:21
6.	"What I'm Talking Bout"	Bryan "BBanga" Johnson	3:24
7.	"Bird Flu"	Zaytoven	3:47
8.	"Drink It Straight" (featuring Trey Songz)	Frado	4:10
9.	"Jump the Line" (featuring Young Gunna)	Arizona Slim	4:03
10.	"G-Love (You Don't Love Me)" (featuring LeToya Luckett)	All Star; Exchange Student	3:31
11.	"Stash House"	Shawty Redd	4:34
12.	"I'm Cool"	Nitti	4:01
13.	"I Move Chickens"	The SupaSonics; Fatboi	3:50
14.	"Ballers" (featuring Shawnna)	Zaytoven	4:03
Total length:			56:51

== Charts ==
=== Weekly charts ===
Chart (2007)	Peak position
US Billboard 200	57
US Top R&B/Hip-Hop Albums (Billboard)	11
US Top Rap Albums (Billboard)	6

=== Year-end charts ===
Chart (2008)	Position
US Top R&B/Hip-Hop Albums (Billboard)	63
