= Hot Boy =

Hot Boy, Hot Boys or Hot Boyz may refer to:

== Hot Boy ==
- Hot Boy (film), an alternative title for Lost in Paradise, a 2011 Vietnamese film
- "Hot Boy" (song), by Nardo Wick featuring Lil Baby
- "Hot Boy", radio edited title for the song "Hot Nigga" by Bobby Shmurda

== Hot Boys ==
- Hot Boys, often styled as Hot Boy$, an American hip hop group from 1996 to 2001 then reformed in 2007

== Hot Boyz ==
- Hot Boyz (film), a 2000 action crime film written and directed by Master P
- "Hot Boyz" (song)", a song by rapper Missy "Misdemeanor" Elliott featuring Lil' Mo

== See also ==
- "Still a Hot Boy", a 2005 album released by rapper Turk
- Hotboii, American rapper
