= Dah Dah DahDah =

2022 song by Nardo Wick

Song by Nardo Wick

from the album Who Is Nardo Wick? (Deluxe)
- Released: July 22, 2022
- Length: 2:31
- Label: Flawless; RCA
- Songwriters: Horace Walls III; Tyler Maline; Wheretfisray
- Producers: Trademark; Wheretfisray

Music video
- "Dah Dah DahDah" on YouTube

"Dah Dah DahDah" is a song by American rapper Nardo Wick from the deluxe version of his debut studio album Who Is Nardo Wick? (2022). Produced by Trademark and Wheretfisray, it contains an interpolation of "Tom's Diner" by Suzanne Vega. In the song, Nardo Wick raps about street life and the violence that accompanies it.

== Music video ==
The official music video was released on August 16, 2022. Directed by Dell Nie, it shows Nardo Wick standing in the rain in a warehouse around dead bodies and rapping alongside baby grand pianos with guns on them.

== Charts ==
Chart performance for "Dah Dah DahDah"
Chart (2022)	Peak position
US Billboard Global 200	178
US Billboard Hot 100	48
US Hot R&B/Hip-Hop Songs (Billboard)	13
