= Freaky Gurl =

Single by Gucci Mane

from the album Hard to Kill and Trap-A-Thon
- Released: September 11, 2007
- Genre: Trap; dirty rap; southern hip hop
- Length: 3:45 (original album version); 4:00 (single version); 4:45 (remix w/ Lil' Kim & Ludacris)
- Label: Big Cat; Atlantic
- Songwriters: Radric Davis; Rick James; Alonzo Miller
- Producer: Cyber Sapp

Gucci Mane singles chronology
"Icy" (2005)	"Freaky Gurl" (2007)	"Stoopid" (2009)

"Freaky Gurl" is a song by rapper Gucci Mane from his 2006 album Hard to Kill and his 2007 album Trap-A-Thon. The song was produced by Cyber Sapp for Big Cat Records, and interpolates "Superfreak" by Rick James, who is credited as a songwriter.

Remixed and released as a single by Atlantic Records, it debuted on the Billboard Hot 100 pop chart at position 94 on October 6, 2007, then rose for two months to a peak of number 62 in early December. It peaked at number 19 on the R&B/Hip-Hop chart at the end of October. The remixed song served as the lead single to Mane's first album with Atlantic: Back to the Trap House.

== Remix ==
The remix features Lil' Kim and Ludacris. Nicki Minaj also remixed the song under the name "Wanna Minaj?" for her mixtape Sucka Free. Her remix features Mane's chorus, Lil' Kim's verse and new verse by Minaj.

== Lawsuit ==
The song sparked a lawsuit by Atlantic Records against Marlon Rowe, CEO of Big Cat Records. Mane had been signed to Big Cat and had released Hard to Kill in 2006 with "Freaky Gurl" on it, with little success. Mane jumped to Atlantic, buying out his Big Cat contract for $300,000 plus royalties. Mane and Atlantic remixed the song with original producer Cyber Sapp, and released the new version as a single in September 2007. When the remix entered the charts, Rowe quickly put together another Mane album—Trap-A-Thon—to capitalize on Mane's new fame, using the original mix of "Freaky Gurl" and Mane's rejected songs that had not made the album cut in 2006. Mane asked his fans not to purchase Trap-A-Thon, saying it was "unfinished and does not represent who I am today as an artist." Atlantic sued Rowe for interfering with their album project Back to the Trap House, which carried the popular remix. Big Cat argued that the remix was based on a song they still owned, and that Sapp used the original multi-track recordings to produce the remix without permission. Rowe and Atlantic resolved their dispute with a "seven-figure deal" benefiting Rowe at the end of 2007.

== Charts ==
=== Weekly charts ===
Chart (2007)	Peak position
US Billboard Hot 100	62
US Hot R&B/Hip-Hop Songs (Billboard)	19
US Hot Rap Songs (Billboard)	12
US Pop 100 (Billboard)	84
US Rhythmic Airplay (Billboard)	20

=== Year-end charts ===
Chart (2007)	Position
US Hot R&B/Hip-Hop Songs (Billboard)	83

== Certifications ==
Region	Certification	Certified units/sales
United States (RIAA)	Gold	500,000^{‡}
^{‡} Sales+streaming figures based on certification alone.
