= Murder Was the Case (Gucci Mane album) =

Studio album by Gucci Mane
- Released: May 5, 2009
- Genre: Southern hip-hop; gangsta rap
- Length: 51:44
- Label: Big Cat
- Producer: Marlon "Big Cat" Rowe (also exec.); Melvin "Mel Man" Breeden (also exec.); A. Cater; DJ Speedy; Tra Beats; Zaytoven

Gucci Mane chronology
Bird Money (2009)	Murder Was the Case (2009)	Writing On The Wall (2009)

Singles from Murder Was the Case
- 1. "Murder For Fun" Released: August 21, 2008; 2. "Stoopid" Released: January 22, 2009; 3. "Runnin' Back" Released: April 20, 2009

Professional ratings
Review scores
Source	Rating
AllMusic	2.5/5 stars
RapReviews	4.5/10

Murder Was the Case is the fifth studio album by American rapper Gucci Mane. It was released on May 5, 2009, through Big Cat Records with distribution via Tommy Boy Entertainment. Production was handled by DJ Speedy, Zaytoven, Melvin "Mel Man" Breeden and Marlon "Big Cat" Rowe, the latter two also served as executive producers.

The album debuted at number 23 on the Billboard 200, making it Gucci Mane's third highest charting album at the time. Three singles were released off the album, the first being "Murder For Fun" which was released on August 21, 2008. The second single was "Stoopid", which was released on January 22, 2009. The final single was "Runnin' Back", which was released on April 20, 2009. The "Stoopid" and "Runnin Back" singles had the following versions of the songs: main, clean, instrumental, dirty and clean a cappellas. The single versions of both songs are longer than on the album ("Runnin' Back" is 4:15 on the single and only 3:52 on the album). The album was also released on vinyl.

== Controversy ==
The album was the subject of controversy between Gucci Mane and Big Cat Records CEO Melvin Rowe, who released the album unofficially. However, in November 2010, the two squashed their beef and announced that they would be working together again.

== Track listing ==
No.	Title	Writer(s)	Producer(s)	Length
1.	"Runnin Back (Getting Fat)"	Radric Davis; Harvey Miller	DJ Speedy	3:52
2.	"Hot!"	Davis; Miller	DJ Speedy; Melvin "Mel Man" Breeden	4:32
3.	"Block Party"	Davis; Xavier Dotson	Zaytoven	4:19
4.	"Stoopid"	Davis; Dotson	Zaytoven	4:21
5.	"Murder Was the Case" (performed by Ox from Belly)			0:18
6.	"Murder for Fun (Young Jeezy Diss)" (featuring Ox)	Davis; Louie Rankin; Melvin Breeden; A. Cater	A. Cater; Melvin "Mel Man" Breeden	4:06
7.	"Trap Money (Remix)" (featuring B.A. and Mook)	Davis; B. Almond; D. Rosario; Dotson	Zaytoven	3:23
8.	"Neva Had Shit"	Davis; Breeden; J. Brooks	Melvin "Mel Man" Breeden	4:15
9.	"Yella Diamonds"	Davis; L. Rogers; T. Slims	Tra Beats	3:05
10.	"Get Low (Like a Lambo)" (featuring Selassie)	Davis; Miller	DJ Speedy	3:33
11.	"Say Damn"	Davis; Miller	DJ Speedy	3:02
12.	"Cuttin off Fingaz"	Davis; Dotson; Marlon Rowe	Zaytoven; Marlon "Big Cat" Rowe	4:58
13.	"Gangs" (featuring Biz)	Davis; T. Tisdale; Dotson	Zaytoven	3:18
14.	"Shittin Onum"	Davis; Miller	DJ Speedy	4:36
Total length:				51:44

== Charts ==
=== Weekly charts ===
Chart (2009)	Peak position
US Billboard 200	23
US Top R&B/Hip-Hop Albums (Billboard)	4
US Independent Albums (Billboard)	3

=== Year-end charts ===
Chart (2009)	Position
US Top R&B/Hip-Hop Albums (Billboard)	80
