= Coochee =

Slang term

Coochie, coochee or coochi is an American term often used as a cute or slang word for a vulva. It has also been used as a slang descriptor in relation to a belly dance and related types of movement.

== In dance and related uses ==
The term is a slang descriptor often used in relation to a belly dance or wiggling, as in "Coochie Coochie dance", "Hoochee-Coochee", and the saying "coochie coochie coo" when tickling an infant. It is also used as sexually suggestive slang in the Southern United States, referring to the vagina.

The slang term 'coochie', popular in the USA is likely to be derived from the German word 'Kuchen', meaning 'a pie or cake'.

It may trace back to a song performed at the 1893 Chicago World's Fair by a dancer named Little Egypt, who was filmed in 1896 by Thomas Edison for the Coochee Coochee Dance film short. The song was created by Sol Bloom.

One explanation of the etymology attributes it to the French word coucher, meaning to lie down.

Another possible root is the Central American and Caribbean Spanish chocha, likewise a slang term for the vulva, possibly derived from the Mexican panocha, yet another slang term for the vulva, in metaphoric transference from the cones of brown sugar sold in Mexican markets.

After the sexually provocative dance became wildly popular during and after the World's Fair, the term "hoochie coochie man" came to refer to someone who either watched the performer(s) or ran the show. Alternatively, from the directly sexual meaning of "hoochie coochie", the term referred to someone who greatly enjoyed sexual intercourse. The erotic dancing was popular in film booths and was a precursor of the striptease.

== In music ==
Various folk and popular songs including the term have been recorded, including an Alabama folk song, "Coochi Coochi Coo" by Ella Fitzgerald, the song "Coochie Coo", and 2 Live Crew's "Pop That Coochie".

== In literature ==
In the 1996 play The Vagina Monologues, "coochi", as in "my coochi snorcher", is one of the slang terms for the vagina. The form "coochi" is derived from the more common "coochie" of the early 1990s.

== See also ==
- "Hoochie Coochie Man"
- "The Streets of Cairo, or the Poor Little Country Maid"
- Coochie Brake
