= Hot Boy (song) =

2023 single by Nardo Wick featuring Lil Baby

Single by Nardo Wick featuring Lil Baby

from the album Wick
- Released: March 31, 2023
- Genre: Trap
- Length: 2:49
- Label: Flawless; RCA
- Songwriters: Horace Walls; Dominique Jones; Kevin Price; Darryl McCorkell; Irvin Whitlow; Josiah Muhammad
- Producers: Go Grizzly; Cheeze Beatz

Nardo Wick singles chronology
"16 Choppa" (2023)	"Hot Boy" (2023)	"Pissy" (2023)

Lil Baby singles chronology
"HO4ME" (2023)	"Hot Boy" (2023)	"Go Hard" (2023)

Music video
- "Hot Boy" on YouTube

"Hot Boy" is a single by American rapper Nardo Wick featuring American rapper Lil Baby, released on March 31, 2023 with an accompanying music video. It was produced by Go Grizzly and Cheeze Beatz. It serves as the lead single to Wick's second studio album, Wick (2025). It is notably the artists' third song together, following "Me or Sum" and "Pop Out".

== Composition ==
The song features a "street-oriented" theme. Over a "rowdy" beat, Nardo Wick begins the song with a chorus followed by a "sharp" verse, and declares himself a "hot boy". Lil Baby performs the second verse.

== Critical reception ==
Alexander Cole of HotNewHipHop gave the song a "Very Hotttt" rating and wrote, "Immediately, you are met with some truly dazzling production here. The drums sound incredible and the entire vibe fits Nardo Wick and his aesthetic perfectly. As for his rapping, he sound focused and as menacing as ever. His flow is impeccable, and if you are already a fan, you are going to be impressed. For those being introduced to Nardo Wick for the first time, this is going to make you a fan. As for Lil Baby, he does his thing as well. In fact, his contributions do a good job of enhancing the song."

== Charts ==
Chart performance for "Hot Boy"
Chart (2023)	Peak position
US Billboard Hot 100 (Billboard)	99
US Hot R&B/Hip-Hop Songs (Billboard)	31
