= Go Hard (Lil Baby song) =

2023 single by Lil Baby

Single by Lil Baby
- Released: April 28, 2023
- Recorded: 2020
- Genre: Trap
- Length: 3:37
- Label: Quality Control; Motown
- Songwriters: Dominique Jones; Rai'Shaun Williams; Noah Pettigrew
- Producers: Section 8; Pettigrew

Lil Baby singles chronology
"Hot Boy" (2023)	"Go Hard" (2023)	"Bluffin" (2023)

Music video
- "Go Hard" on YouTube

"Go Hard" is a song by American rapper Lil Baby, released on April 28, 2023 after being previously teased in 2020. It was produced by Section 8 and Noah Pettigrew.

== Background ==
Lil Baby first previewed the song in May 2020, in an Instagram video of him and basketball player James Harden hanging out; the track was then called "Again (Go Hard)". In April 2023, Baby shared a snippet of the music video, releasing the song a few days later.

== Composition and lyrics ==
The production of the song features piano keys and trap drums, over which Lil Baby raps melodically, about topics such as his aspirations, trust issues, and blessings. In the chorus, he raps: "I'm back goin' hard again, I'm shuttin' down my heart again / No one can get next to me, so they gotta put orders in / Try my best to act like I didn't care, but I can't hold it in and / I'm not into losin', I go hard as I can go to win".

== Critical reception ==
Alexander Cole of HotNewHipHop wrote, "Overall, Lil Baby has an immaculate flow here as the melodic rapping sounds fantastic. This is the sound that fans expect from Baby, and it definitely goes hard here."

== Music video ==
An official music video was released alongside the single. Directed by Never Panic Films, it sees Lil Baby throwing a massive party with his crew on multiple yachts, cruising through Miami and surrounded by bikini-clad and twerking women, before going to the restaurant Kiki on the River. The party also includes jet skis and fireworks. Baby is wearing jewelry and at one point is seen getting a massage. His baby mama Jayda Cheaves makes an appearance in the video.

== Charts ==
Chart performance for "Go Hard"
Chart (2023)	Peak position
Canada Hot 100 (Billboard)	70
Global 200 (Billboard)	179
US Billboard Hot 100	59
US Hot R&B/Hip-Hop Songs (Billboard)	17
