= Merch Madness =

2023 single by Lil Baby

Single by Lil Baby
- Released: July 6, 2023
- Genre: Trap
- Length: 2:28
- Label: Quality Control; Motown
- Songwriters: Dominique Jones; Tony Son; Fourteen Hongmahasak
- Producers: Richie Souf; Fourteen

Lil Baby singles chronology
"Bluffin" (2023)	"Merch Madness" (2023)	"Family Freestyle" (2023)

Music video
- "Merch Madness" on YouTube

"Merch Madness" is a single by American rapper Lil Baby, released on July 6, 2023 as part of his collaboration with Fanatics, Inc. It was produced by Richie Souf and Fourteen.

== Background and content ==
In June 2023, Lil Baby partnered with Fanatics CEO Michael Rubin and aided in the company's charity work of distributing $20 million worth of merchandise across the United States. He details his involvement in the philanthropic activities, as well as inspiring others, uplifting and creating opportunities for the youth.

== Music video ==
The music video was filmed as part of Fanatics Global Volunteer Day, directed by Richie Souf and Eva Nosidam and released on July 7, 2023. It begins with footage from Frederick Douglass Academy on the last day of school, as a speech from an educator about Lil Baby's collaboration with Fanatics. Dressed in an Atlanta Hawks jersey, Baby is seen roaming the halls and classrooms, distributing sports gear to kids and getting to know them, and rapping atop a school bus. The video also features cameos from Rubin and other celebrities who participated in Fanatics Global Volunteer Day, including NBA players Chris Paul, Joel Embiid and Donovan Mitchell, NFL players Eli Manning, Tom Brady, Odell Beckham Jr. and Russell Wilson, rap artists ASAP Ferg, Meek Mill, Quavo and DJ Khaled and journalist Taylor Rooks.

== Charts ==
Chart performance for "Merch Madness"
Chart (2023)	Peak position
US Bubbling Under Hot 100 (Billboard)	8
US Hot R&B/Hip-Hop Songs (Billboard)	30
