= Breath of Fresh Air =

Studio album by Gucci Mane
- Released: October 17, 2023
- Length: 73:52
- Label: 1017; Atlantic
- Producer: Ambezza; Avo No Sleep; Bandplay; BMC; Dez Wright; DKJ; Elyas; Eza; Fourteen; Hitkidd; J. White Did It; Indyah; Koncept P; Kori Anders; Kuttabeatz; LMC; Mike Will Made It; Moneygoformiles; Murda Beatz; Nik Dean; ProdBySquare; Richie Souf; Tay Keith; TP808; Will No Sleep; Zaytoven

Gucci Mane chronology
1017 Up Next (2023)	Breath of Fresh Air (2023)	Choppers & Bricks (2023)

Singles from Breath of Fresh Air
- 1. "King Snipe" Released: January 13, 2023; 2. "06 Gucci" Released: March 31, 2023; 3. "Pissy" Released: May 5, 2023; 4. "Bluffin" Released: June 15, 2023; 5. "Married with Millions" Released: July 20, 2023; 6. "Woppenheimer" Released: July 28, 2023; 7. "Now It's Real" Released: August 10, 2023; 8. "Broken Hearted" Released: August 17, 2023; 9. "There I Go" Released: August 25, 2023

Breath of Fresh Air is the sixteenth studio album by American rapper Gucci Mane. It was released through Atlantic and 1017 on October 17, 2023. The album features guest appearances from Lil Baby, the late Young Dolph, Li Rye, Sett, Key Glock, Mac Critter, J. Cole, Mike Will Made It, Kodak Black, DaBaby, 21 Savage, Roddy Ricch, and Nardo Wick. Production was handled by Mike Will Made It himself, J. White Did It, Zaytoven, Murda Beatz, and Tay Keith, among others. A double album that was supported by nine singles, it was released on the sixth wedding anniversary of Mane and his wife, Jamaican model Keyshia Ka'oir. Mane announced the album along with its title, cover art, and release date on June 26, 2023, and shared its tracklist in collaboration with Spotify hip hop playlist RapCaviar on October 11, 2023.

== Background ==
Breath of Fresh Air was released on the sixth wedding anniversary of Mane and his wife, Jamaican model Keyshia Ka'oir. Mane announced the album along with its title, cover art, and release date on June 26, 2023, and shared its tracklist in collaboration with Spotify hip hop playlist RapCaviar on October 11, 2023.

== Release and promotion ==
On June 16, 2023, Gucci Mane announced the album and later that day, his new interview with Apple's "Zane Lowe" premiered. In it, Gucci revealed that his approach to the record was unlike his previous projects. This time around, he was more intentional about his lyrical content. He noted that the tragic killings of Young Dolph and Takeoff and the arrests of his friends/labelmates Pooh Shiesty and Foogiano led him to take a rap detour. Gucci later stated, "I'm just not in the mood to hear a whole bunch of drilling and killing and this and that", Gucci said that he has a new approach to music that will be better than before.

== Singles ==
The lead single of the album, "King Snipe", a collaboration with fellow American rapper Kodak Black, was released on January 13, 2023. The second single, "06 Gucci", which features rappers DaBaby and 21 Savage, was released on March 31, 2023. The third single, "Pissy", which features fellow American rappers Roddy Ricch and Nardo Wick, was released on May 5, 2023. The fourth single, "Bluffin", which features fellow American rapper Lil Baby, was released on June 15, 2023. The fifth single, "Married with Millions", was released on July 20, 2023. The sixth single, "Woppenheimer", was released on July 28, 2023. The seventh single, "Now It's Real", was released on August 10, 2023. The eighth single, "Broken Hearted", was released on August 17, 2023. The ninth and final single, "There I Go", was released on August 25, 2023, and it features American rapper J.Cole and American record producer Mike Will Made It.

== Music videos ==
All nine of the singles being "King Snipe", "06 Gucci", "Pissy", "Bluffin", "Married with Millions", "Woppenheimer", "Now It's Real", "Broken Hearted", and "There I Go" were all released alongside their music videos. Track 1 titled "Must Be Me" and its music video was released alongside the album while the music videos for tracks 4 and 8 being "Trap Money" and "Talking to the Streets" were released after the album, being October 27, 2023, for "Trap Money", and November 13, 2023, for "Talking to the Streets". Track 6 titled "Glizock & Wizop" has an official visualizer released alongside the album.

== Critical reception ==
Professional ratings
Review scores
Source	Rating
HipHopDX	3.9/5

Writing for HipHopDX, Peter A. Berry felt that the album is a throwback to the early '90s when he said, "If you're an early '90s baby, the real zinger is this: One of your favorite crunk deep cuts is officially old enough to be sampled. Like, in the same way that Dr. Dre reimagined '70s soul records. The music you grew up on is the old school." Peter A. Barry continues to talk about how the J. Cole assisted "There I Go" or the DaBaby and 21 Savage assisted "06 Gucci" are "a banger" and "slap" and he goes on to say they are "self-referential anthems with standout stanzas" meaning he really enjoyed the songs and he later continued to say that the Roddy Ricch and Nardo Wick assisted "Pissy" was an excellent throwback to Gucci's 2009 single "Lemonade" and he said that "Pissy" was just as good if not even better and he continued to talk about how good the songs are.

== Track listing ==
Breath of Fresh Air – Disc one (Streaming release)
No.	Title	Writer(s)	Producer(s)	Length
1.	"Must Be Me"	Radric Davis; Anthony White; Ed Townsend	J. White Did It	3:30
2.	"Bluffin" (featuring Lil Baby)	Davis; Dominique Jones; Zachary Mullett; Liam McAlister; Indyah McAlister; Alfredo Matteucci	Kuttabeatz; LMC; Indyah; ProdBySquare	2:28
3.	"Thank Me" (featuring Young Dolph)	Davis; Adolph Thornton; Khayree Shaheed; Jamal Ester; Kori Anders	Anders	2:48
4.	"Trap Money" (featuring Li Rye and Sett)	Davis; Roderick Henderson; Kaimon Carwell; Daniel Johnson; Aubrey Johnson; Henry Zant	DKJ	2:58
5.	"Pretty Girls" (featuring Young Dolph)	Davis; Thornton; Michael Williams II	Mike Will Made It	3:00
6.	"Glizock & Wizop" (featuring Key Glock)	Davis; Markeyvius Cathey; Krishon Gaines	Bandplay	3:12
7.	"Internet Chatter"	Davis; Shane Lindstrom; Dylan Cleary-Krell	Dez Wright	2:19
8.	"Talking to the Streets" (featuring Mac Critter)	Davis; Daniel Bates; Williams; Xavier Dotson	Mike Will Made It; Zaytoven	2:44
9.	"There I Go" (featuring J. Cole and Mike Will Made It)	Davis; Jermaine Cole; Williams; Myles Harris	Mike Will Made It; Moneygoformyles	2:52
10.	"Mr. & Mrs. Perfect"	Davis; Lindstrom; Elias Sticken; Bryan Allen	Murda Beatz; Elyas; BMC	3:03
11.	"I Know"	Davis; Brytavious Chambers; Alexander Monro	Tay Keith; Eza	2:15
12.	"Stomach Grumbling"	Davis; Anthony Holmes, Jr.; Tiquon Pryor	Hitkidd; TP808	3:02

Breath of Fresh Air – Disc two (Streaming release)
No.	Title	Writer(s)	Producer(s)	Length
1.	"Business Not Personal"	Davis; Pryor	TP808	3:22
2.	"King Snipe" (with Kodak Black)	Davis; Bill Kapri; Tony Son; Fourteen Hongmahasak	Richie Souf; Fourteen	3:34
3.	"06 Gucci" (featuring DaBaby and 21 Savage)	Davis; Jonathan Kirk; Shéyaa Abraham-Joseph; Mathias Liyew; Dejan Nikolic	Ambezza; Nik Dean	2:58
4.	"Pissy" (featuring Roddy Ricch and Nardo Wick)	Davis; Rodrick Moore Jr.; Horace Walls III; Paul Penso; William Benoit; Avery Halliburton	Koncept P; Avo No Sleep; Will No Sleep	3:38
5.	"Say No Mo"	Davis; Dotson	Zaytoven	2:59
6.	"Married with Millions"	Davis; Pryor	TP808	3:19
7.	"Woppenheimer"	Davis; Pryor	TP808	3:21
8.	"Now It's Real"	Davis; Pryor	TP808	4:13
9.	"Broken Hearted"	Davis; Pryor	TP808	3:27
10.	"Hurt People"	Davis; Pryor	TP808	3:20
11.	"By the Water"	Davis; Dotson	Zaytoven	2:52
12.	"Big Boy Diamonds" (featuring Kodak Black and London on da Track)	Davis; Kapri; London Holmes; Nick Seeley	London on da Track; Seeley	2:31

Breath of Fresh Air – CD release
No.	Title	Writer(s)	Producer(s)	Length
1.	"There I Go" (featuring J. Cole and Mike Will Made It)	Davis; Jermaine Cole; Williams; Myles Harris	Mike Will Made It; Moneygoformyles	2:52
2.	"Bluffin" (featuring Lil Baby)	Davis; Dominique Jones; Zachary Mullett; Liam McAlister; Indyah McAlister; Alfredo Matteucci	Kuttabeatz; LMC; Indyah; ProdBySquare	2:28
3.	"King Snipe" (with Kodak Black)	Davis; Bill Kapri; Tony Son; Fourteen Hongmahasak	Richie Souf; Fourteen	3:34
4.	"06 Gucci" (featuring DaBaby and 21 Savage)	Davis; Jonathan Kirk; Shéyaa Abraham-Joseph; Mathias Liyew; Dejan Nikolic	Ambezza; Nik Dean	2:58
5.	"Pissy" (featuring Roddy Ricch and Nardo Wick)	Davis; Rodrick Moore Jr.; Horace Walls III; Paul Penso; William Benoit; Avery Halliburton	Koncept P; Avo No Sleep; Will No Sleep	3:38
6.	"Glizock & Wizop" (featuring Key Glock)	Davis; Markeyvius Cathey; Krishon Gaines	Bandplay	3:12
7.	"Stomach Grumbling"	Davis; Anthony Holmes, Jr.; Tiquon Pryor	Hitkidd; TP808	3:02
8.	"Married with Millions"	Davis; Pryor	TP808	3:19
9.	"Woppenheimer"	Davis; Pryor	TP808	3:21
10.	"Now It's Real"	Davis; Pryor	TP808	4:13
11.	"Broken Hearted"	Davis; Pryor	TP808	3:27
12.	"Hurt People"	Davis; Pryor	TP808	3:20
13.	"Business Not Personal"	Davis; Pryor	TP808	3:22
14.	"Big Boy Diamonds" (featuring Kodak Black and London on da Track)	Davis; Kapri; London Holmes; Nick Seeley	London on da Track; Seeley	2:31

Notes

- "Big Boy Diamonds" features background vocals by Vaughn Biggs and also appears on Gucci Mane's fourteenth studio album, Woptober II (2019).
- "Talking to the Streets" is stylized as "Talkin to the Streets" on Gucci's YouTube channel.

== Personnel ==
Credits adapted from Tidal and Genius.

=== Artists ===
- Gucci Mane (Primary Artist all tracks)
- Kodak Black (Primary Artist track 2, disc 2 Featured Artist track 12, disc 2)
- Lil Baby (Featured Artist track 2, disc 1)
- Young Dolph (Featured Artist track 3 & 5, disc 1)
- Li Rye (Featured Artist track 4, disc 1)
- Sett (Featured Artist track 4, disc 1)
- Key Glock (Featured Artist track 6, disc 1)
- Mac Critter (Featured Artist track 8, disc 1)
- J. Cole (Featured Artist track 9, disc 1)
- DaBaby (Featured Artist track 3, disc 2)
- 21 Savage (Featured Artist track 3, disc 2)
- Roddy Ricch (Featured Artist track 4, disc 2)
- Nardo Wick (Featured Artist track 4, disc 2)

=== Credited production ===
- Mike Will Made It (Credited Record Producer track 9, disc 1)
- London on da Track (Credited Record Producer track 24, disc 2)

=== Record Producers ===
- J. White Did It (Record Producer track 1, disc 1)
- Kuttabeatz (Record Producer track 2, disc 1)
- LMC (Record Producer track 2, disc 1)
- Indyah (Record Producer track 2, disc 1)
- ProdBySquare (Record Producer track 2, disc 1)
- Anders (Record Producer track 3, disc 1)
- DKJ (Record Producer track 4, disc 1)
- Mike Will Made It (Record Producer track 5, 8 & 9, disc 1)
- Bandplay (Record Producer track 6, disc 1)
- Dez Wright (Record Producer track 7, disc 1)
- Zaytoven (Record Producer track 8, disc 1 & track 5, disc 2)
- Moneygoformyles (Record Producer track 9, disc 1)
- Murda Beatz (Record Producer track 10, disc 1)
- Elyas, BMC (Record Producer track 10, disc 1)
- Tay Keith (Record Producer track 11, disc 1)
- Eza (Record Producer track 11, disc 1)
- Hitkidd (Record Producer track 12, disc 1)
- TP808 (Record Producer track 12, disc 1 & track 1,6,7,8,9 & 10, disc 2)
- Richie Souf (Record Producer track 2, disc 2)
- Fourteen (Record Producer track 2, disc 2)
- Ambezza (Record Producer track 3, disc 2)
- Nik Dean (Record Producer track 3, disc 2)

== Charts ==
Chart performance for Breath of Fresh Air
Chart (2023)	Peak position
US Billboard 200	141
