= There I Go (Gucci Mane song) =

2023 single by Gucci Mane featuring J. Cole and Mike Will Made It

Single by Gucci Mane featuring J. Cole and Mike Will Made It

from the album Breath of Fresh Air
- Released: August 25, 2023
- Length: 2:52
- Label: Atlantic; 1017
- Songwriters: Radric Davis; Jermaine Cole; Michael Williams; Myles Harris
- Producers: Mike Will Made It; Myles Harris

Gucci Mane singles chronology
"Broken Hearted" (2023)	"There I Go" (2023)	"Tired of Being Broke" (2023)

J. Cole singles chronology
"Passport Bros" (2023)	"There I Go" (2023)	"The Secret Recipe" (2023)

Mike Will Made It singles chronology
"Blood Moon" (2023)	"There I Go" (2023)	"Pop It" (2023)

Music video
- "There I Go" on YouTube

"There I Go" is a song by American rapper Gucci Mane featuring fellow American rapper J. Cole and American record producer Mike Will Made It. It was released as the ninth and final single from Mane's sixteenth studio album, Breath of Fresh Air, on August 25, 2023. The song was produced by Mike Will Made It himself and Myles Harris, both of whom co-wrote the song with Mane and Cole.

== Composition and lyrics ==
On August 22, 2023, Gucci Mane announced the release of the song and revealed the cover art on social media. On the song, J. Cole raps about being drug-free but not judging those that indulge in those activities: "I'm a straight shooter, no sugarcoat / No booger sugar, never had a nose full of dope / It's all good folks, cope how you wanna cope / Drink what you wanna drink, smoke what you wanna smoke / Stroke who you wanna strokе". Jordan Darville of The Fader felt that "Cole's verse isn't particularly memorable — you get the sense that he's a bit too relaxed — but Gucci swoops in with a swagger and charisma that endures even if he's miles away from his sonic beginnings".

== Charts ==
=== Weekly charts ===
Weekly chart performance for "There I Go"
Chart (2023)	Peak position
New Zealand Hot Singles (RMNZ)	13
US Billboard Hot 100	94
US Hot R&B/Hip-Hop Songs (Billboard)	27
US Rhythmic Airplay (Billboard)	5

=== Year-end charts ===
2024 year-end chart performance for "There I Go"
Chart (2024)	Position
US Rhythmic (Billboard)	49
