= Who Is Nardo Wick? =

Studio album by Nardo Wick
- Released: December 3, 2021
- Genre: Trap
- Length: 49:13
- Label: Flawless; RCA
- Producer: Arkay; Boi-1da; Corbett; Cubeatz; David x Eli; DB; Donnie Katana; DVLP; Ele Beatz; Emkay; Flex OTB; Foreverolling; G1; Hit-Boy; Ice Melodies; JT; Kid Hazel; Leon Thomas III; Luis Bacqué; Luxury; Murda Beatz; Onokey; Peter Gundry; Tay Keith; Z3N

Nardo Wick chronology
Who Is Nardo Wick? (2021)	Wick (2025)

Singles from Who Is Nardo Wick?
- 1. "Shhh" Released: April 23, 2021; 2. "Who Want Smoke??" Released: October 8, 2021; 3. "Me or Sum" Released: November 29, 2021; 4. "Krazy Krazy" Released: April 29, 2022; 5. "Riot" Released: June 10, 2022

Professional ratings
Review scores
Source	Rating
AllMusic	3/5 stars
Clash	8/10
HipHopDX	4.0/5

Who Is Nardo Wick? is the debut studio album by American rapper Nardo Wick. It was released on December 3, 2021, by Flawless Entertainment and RCA Records. The album features guest appearances from Future, Lil Baby, Hit-Boy, G Herbo, Lil Durk, 21 Savage, Lakeyah, and Big30. Serving as the first project he has released, the project finds him working with prominent producers, such as Hit-Boy, Boi-1da, DVLP, Leon Thomas III, Tay Keith, Cubeatz, and Murda Beatz, as well as emerging producers, such as brothers Emkay and Arkay, Onokey, Corbett, Ice Melodies and Z3N, among others. Wick announced the album and its release date on November 28, 2021. The deluxe version, titled Who Is Nardo Wick? 2 was released on July 22, 2022, with additional guest features from the Kid Laroi and Latto.

== Singles ==
Three singles were released prior to the album's release. The lead single, "Shhh", was released on April 23, 2021. The second single, "Who Want Smoke??", which features fellow rappers G Herbo, Lil Durk, and 21 Savage, an official remix of Wick's 2021 single, "Who Want Smoke?", was released on October 8, 2021. The third single, "Me or Sum", which features fellow rappers Future and Lil Baby, was released on November 29, 2021.

== Commercial performance ==
Who Is Nardo Wick? debuted at number 16 on the US Billboard 200. On July 13, 2022, the album was certified gold by the Recording Industry Association of America (RIAA) for selling over half a million album-equivalent units in the United States. On March 24, 2023, it was certified platinum for selling over one million album-equivalent units in the United States.

== Track listing ==
Who is Nardo Wick? track listing
No.	Title	Writer(s)	Producer(s)	Length
1.	"Wickman"	Horace Walls III; Donte Moore Jr.; Aubrey Graham; Nayvadius Wilburn; Leland Wayne	Donnie Katana	2:14
2.	"Alright"	Walls; Mark Onokey; Carlos Pfersdorf; Rick Onokey	Emkay; Arkay	2:57
3.	"Chop Chop"	Walls; R. Onokey; Darryon Bunton	Arkay; DB	2:31
4.	"Blam Boom"	Walls; Jeffrey Jones Jr.; Aaron Butler; Jeremiah Tesfaye	Foreverolling; Flex OTB; JT	2:38
5.	"Me or Sum" (featuring Future and Lil Baby)	Walls; Wilburn; Dominique Jones; Juan Guerreri-Maril; Bigram Zayas; Donny Flores; Emmanuel Dionisopoulos; Xavier Martinez	Z3N; DVLP	3:45
6.	"Play wit Me"	Walls; Pfersdorf	Onokey	2:03
7.	"Lullaby"	Walls; Brytavious Chambers	Tay Keith	2:15
8.	"Power" (featuring Hit-Boy)	Walls; Chauncey Hollis Jr.; Dustin Corbett	Hit-Boy; Corbett	1:41
9.	"Who Want Smoke??" (featuring G Herbo, Lil Durk, and 21 Savage)	Walls; Herbert Wright III; Durk Banks; Shayaa Abraham-Joseph; M. Onokey; Pfersdorf	Emkay	4:39
10.	"Why"	Walls; M. Onokey; Pfersdorf; R. Onokey; Bunton	Emkay; Onokey; Arkay; DB	2:41
11.	"Alley Cat"	Walls; Jeuan Tabarrejo	G1	2:34
12.	"Wicked Witch"	Walls; M. Onokey; Pfersdorf; Peter Gundry	Emkay; Gundry	2:44
13.	"Wicked Freestyle"	Walls; Matthew Samuels; Kevin Gomringer; Tim Gomringer; Leon Thomas III; Eelis Oikarinen; Luis Bacqué	Boi-1da; Cubeatz; Thomas; Ele Beatz; Bacqué	2:48
14.	"Baby Wyd?" (featuring Lakeyah)	Walls; Lakeyah Robinson; Ahmar Bailey; David Ruoff; Elias Klughammer	Kid Hazel; David x Eli	2:55
15.	"Poppin Out" (featuring Big30)	Walls; Rodney Wright, Jr.; Shane Lindstrom	Murda Beatz	2:43
16.	"Bad Boy"	Walls; R. Onokey	Arkay	2:30
17.	"Shhh"	Walls; M. Onokey; Pfersdorf; R. Onokey	Emkay; Arkay	2:20
18.	"Rich Maniac"	Walls; R. Onokey; Luis Gärdes; Roman Rios	Arkay; Luxury; Ice Melodies	2:08
Total length:				49:13

Deluxe bonus tracks
No.	Title	Writer(s)	Producer(s)	Length
1.	"Excuse My French"	Walls; ShortyyK; Rizzo8; Tyler Maline	ShortyyK; Rizzo8; Trademark	3:02
2.	"Dah Dah DahDah"	Walls; Maline; Wheretfisray	Trademark; Wheretfisray	2:31
3.	"Demon Mode"	Walls; Maline	Trademark	2:58
4.	"Fan Hoes"	Walls; Maline; Mingus; Igunek	Trademark; Mingus; Igunek	2:23
5.	"Lovey Dovey"	Walls; Darryon Bunton	DB	2:47
6.	"No Game"	Walls; R. Onokey	Arkay	2:50
7.	"Burning Up" (featuring The Kid Laroi)	Walls; Charlton Howard; Maline; Looisey; Wheretfisray; Cloud	Trademark; Looisey; Wheretfisray; Cloud	2:08
8.	"Ceiling Fan Crew"	Walls; M. Onokey; Pfersdorf	Emkay; Onokey	2:41
9.	"Baby Wyd (Remix)" (featuring Latto and Lakeyah)	Walls; Alyssa Stephens; Lakeyah Robinson; Ahmar Bailey	Kid Hazel; David x Eli	3:48
10.	"Krazy Krazy"	Walls; Brytavious Chambers	Tay Keith; Eza	2:22
11.	"Riot"	Walls; Indyah McAlister; Liam McAlister; JM; MacShooter49; Maline	Indyah; LMC; JM; MacShooter49; Trademark	2:25
12.	"Gotham City"	Walls; Pfersdorf	Onokey	2:23

Sample credits

- "Wickman" contains an interpolation of "Jumpman", written by Drake, Future, and Metro Boomin as performed by the former two and produced by the latter.
- "Dah Dah DahDah" contains an interpolation of "Tom's Diner", written by Suzanne Vega, and a sample of "The Gingerbread Man" song.

== Credits and personnel ==
- Brandon Blatz – assistant engineer (tracks 1, 4, 6, 7, 10, 13–16, 18)
- Curtis "Sircut" Bye – mixing engineer (tracks 1, 4, 6, 7, 10, 13–16, 18)
- Cyrus "Nois" Taghipour – mixing engineer (tracks 1, 4, 6, 7, 10, 13–16, 18)
- Derek Ali – mixing engineer (tracks 1, 4, 6, 7, 10, 13–16, 18)
- Tatsuya Sato – mastering engineer (all tracks)
- Nardo Wick – mixing engineer, recording engineer (tracks 2, 3, 5, 9, 11, 12, 17)
- Liz Robson – recording engineer (track 4)
- David Yungin Kim – mixing engineer (track 8)
- Ben Lidsky – mixing engineer (track 9)
- Max Lord – mixing engineer (track 9)

== Charts ==
=== Weekly charts ===
Weekly chart performance for Who Is Nardo Wick?
Chart (2021–2022)	Peak position
Australian Hitseekers Albums (ARIA)	15
US Billboard 200	16
US Top R&B/Hip-Hop Albums (Billboard)	7

=== Year-end charts ===
2022 year-end chart performance for Who Is Nardo Wick?
Chart (2022)	Position
US Billboard 200	48
US Top R&B/Hip-Hop Albums (Billboard)	26

2023 year-end chart performance for Who Is Nardo Wick?
Chart (2023)	Position
US Billboard 200	164
US Top R&B/Hip-Hop Albums (Billboard)	76

== Certifications ==
Certifications for Who Is Nardo Wick?
Region	Certification	Certified units/sales
United States (RIAA)	Platinum	1,000,000^{‡}
^{‡} Sales+streaming figures based on certification alone.
