= Nardo Wick =

American rapper (born 2001)

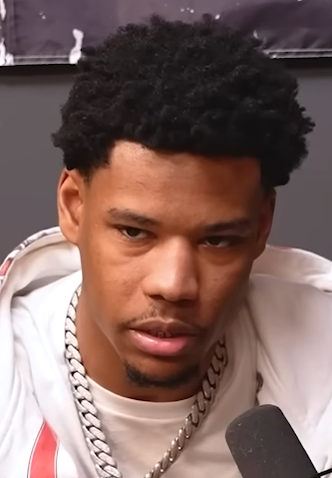
- Nardo Wick in April 2025

Background information
- Also known as: Wickman
- Born: Horace Bernard Walls III; December 30, 2001 (age 24); Jacksonville, Florida, U.S.
- Genres: Hip-hop; trap; gangsta rap; drill
- Occupations: Rapper; songwriter
- Years active: 2020–present
- Labels: Flawless; RCA (former)
- Website: nardowick.com

Horace Bernard Walls III (born December 30, 2001), known professionally as Nardo Wick, is an American rapper. He signed with RCA Records in 2021 and gained mainstream recognition following the commercial release of his single "Who Want Smoke?" in January of that year. The song spawned a remix featuring rappers G Herbo, Lil Durk, and 21 Savage, which peaked at number 17 on the Billboard Hot 100 and received platinum certification by the Recording Industry Association of America (RIAA). His debut studio album, Who Is Nardo Wick?, was released in December 2021, and peaked at number 17 on the Billboard 200.

== Career ==
Wick released his debut single, "Lolli". He then released the single "Slide". He then released the single "Came Up" as the final release of the year. Starting off 2021, he released the single "Who Want Smoke?" on January 22, 2021. Wick released the single "Shhh" on April 23, 2021. It serves as the lead single to his debut studio album, Who Is Nardo Wick?. On August 27, 2021, Wick was featured on fellow American rapper 42 Dugg's song "Opp Pack", from the deluxe edition of the latter's commercial mixtape Free Dem Boyz. The song served as Wick's first time being featured on a song by another artist.

On October 8, 2021, Wick released another version of "Who Want Smoke?", which features fellow rappers G Herbo, Lil Durk, and 21 Savage. The song serves as the second single to Who Is Nardo Wick? and was released alongside an accompanying music video directed by Cole Bennett in association with Lyrical Lemonade. The new version boosted the popularity of the song alongside a dance to it that was created on the video-sharing app TikTok, which debuted at number 17 on the Billboard Hot 100 and became certified triple platinum by the RIAA, which gave Wick both his first charting song and his first song that received a certification, respectively. Two days later, Wick was featured on rapper Katana 10400's single "She Want Me Dead!", which served as Wick's second feature and first time being featured on a single.

Wick released the single "Me or Sum", which features fellow rappers Future and Lil Baby, on November 29, 2021. It serves as the second single of Who Is Nardo Wick? and would go on to peak at number 58 on the Billboard Hot 100 and be certified double platinum. The subsequent album was released four days later, on December 3, 2021. It features new guest appearances from Hit-Boy, Big30, and Lakeyah. It became certified platinum by the RIAA, and peaked at number 16 on the US albums chart. On July 22, 2022, Wick released the deluxe version Who Is Nardo Wick? 2, with additional guest features from the Kid Laroi and Latto.

On March 31, 2023, a hit single by Wick was released, "Hot Boy", which peaked at number 99 on the Billboard Hot 100 and featured American rapper Lil Baby. On May 5, 2023, he was co-featured alongside fellow rapper Roddy Ricch on fellow rapper Gucci Mane's single "Pissy", the song later appeared as the fourth single on Gucci's sixteenth studio album, Breath of Fresh Air. Later in 2023, Wick was co-featured alongside G Herbo on Mudbaby Ru's single "Gun Class ll".

Wick's second studio album, Wick, was released on February 21, 2025. It features guest appearances by 21 Savage, Future, Lil Baby, Sexyy Red, and Southside.

== Personal life ==
On August 18, 2021, Walls was arrested by US marshals on a concealed weapon charge. He was released soon afterward.

== Discography ==
Wick has released two studio albums and 12 singles (including three as a featured artist). His signature song is "Who Want Smoke?", which has a remix featuring Chicago rappers G Herbo, and Lil Durk, and Atlanta rapper 21 Savage. The remix is stylized with two question marks.

=== Studio albums ===
| Title | Details | Peak chart positions | | Certifications |
| Title | Details | US | US R&B/HH | Certifications |
|---|---|---|---|---|
| Who Is Nardo Wick? | Released: December 3, 2021; Labels: Flawless, RCA; Format: Digital download, streaming | 16 | 7 | RIAA: Platinum |
| Wick | Released: February 21, 2025; Labels: Flawless, RCA; Format: Digital download, streaming | — | — | |

=== Extended plays ===
| Title | EP details |
|---|---|
| Hold Off | Released: February 6, 2025; Labels: Flawless, RCA; Format: Digital download, streaming |

=== Singles ===
==== As lead artist ====
List of singles as lead artist, with selected chart positions and certifications shown
| Title | Year | Peak chart positions | | | | | | Certifications | Album |
| Title | Year | US | US R&B /HH | US Rap | CAN | NZ Hot | WW | Certifications | Album |
|---|---|---|---|---|---|---|---|---|---|
| "Came Up" | 2020 | — | — | — | — | — | — | | Non-album singles |
| "Slide" | 2020 | — | — | — | — | — | — | | Non-album singles |
| "Who Want Smoke?" (solo or remix featuring G Herbo, Lil Durk, and 21 Savage) | 2021 | 17 | 5 | 3 | 41 | 15 | 37 | RIAA: 3× Platinum; MC: Platinum | Who Is Nardo Wick? (Note: While the solo version does not appear on any album, the version that features G Herbo, Lil Durk, and 21 Savage appears on Who Is Nardo Wick? and is titled "Who Want Smoke??", which adds a question mark to the title.) |
| "Me or Sum" (featuring Future and Lil Baby) | 2021 | 58 | 15 | 10 | — | — | — | RIAA: 2× Platinum | Who Is Nardo Wick? |
| "Wicked Witch" | 2021 | — | — | — | — | — | — | RIAA: Gold | Who Is Nardo Wick? |
| "Wicked Freestyle" | 2021 | — | — | — | — | — | — | RIAA: Gold | Who Is Nardo Wick? |
| "Krazy Krazy" | 2022 | — | — | — | — | — | — | | Who Is Nardo Wick? |
| "Riot" | 2022 | — | — | — | — | — | — | | Who Is Nardo Wick? |
| "Hot Boy" (featuring Lil Baby) | 2023 | 99 | 31 | 20 | — | — | — | | Wick |
| "Lamborghini Boys" (with Lil Darius and Tay Keith | 2023 | — | — | — | — | — | — | | Yung N Turnt |
| "Somethin'" (featuring Sexyy Red) | 2024 | — | — | — | — | — | — | | Wick |
| "Wickstyle" | 2024 | — | — | — | — | — | — | | Non-album singles |
| "Back to Back" (featuring Future and Southside) | 2024 | — | — | — | — | 33 | — | | Wick |
| "Deep End" | 2024 | — | — | — | — | — | — | | Non-album singles |
| "Oh Shit" (featuring BossMan Dlow) | 2024 | — | — | — | — | — | — | | Non-album singles |
| "I Wonder" | 2025 | — | — | — | — | — | — | | Hold Off |
| "HBK" (featuring 21 Savage) | 2025 | — | — | — | — | 31 | — | | Wick |
"—" denotes a recording that did not chart or was not released in that territory.

==== As featured artist ====
List of singles as featured artist, with selected chart positions and certifications shown
| Title | Year | Peak chart positions | | Album |
| Title | Year | US Bub. | US R&B /HH | Album |
|---|---|---|---|---|
| "She Want Me Dead!" (Katana 10400 featuring Nardo Wick) | 2021 | — | — | Non-album single |
| "Pissy" (Gucci Mane featuring Roddy Ricch and Nardo Wick) | 2023 | 15 | 37 | Breath of Fresh Air |
| "Gun Class ll" (Mudbaby Ru featuring Nardo Wick and G Herbo) | 2023 | - | 6 | Non-album single |

=== Other charted and certified songs ===
List of other charted and certified songs, with selected chart positions, showing year released, certification and album name
| Title | Year | Peak chart positions | | | | | | Certifications | Album |
| Title | Year | US | US R&B /HH | US Rap | CAN | NZ Hot | WW | Certifications | Album |
|---|---|---|---|---|---|---|---|---|---|
| "Baby WYD?" (featuring Lakeyah) | 2021 | — | — | — | — | — | — | RIAA: Gold | Who Is Nardo Wick? |
| "Burning Up" (featuring the Kid Laroi) | 2022 | — | — | — | — | 32 | — | | Who Is Nardo Wick?? (Deluxe) |
| "Dah Dah DahDah" | 2022 | 48 | 13 | 12 | — | — | 178 | RIAA: Platinum | Who Is Nardo Wick?? (Deluxe) |
| "It Ain't Safe" (DJ Khaled featuring Nardo Wick and Kodak Black) | 2022 | 77 | 26 | 23 | 89 | — | 185 | | God Did |
| "Pop Out" (Lil Baby featuring Nardo Wick) | 2022 | 15 | 6 | 6 | 50 | 20 | 28 | RIAA: Gold | It's Only Me |
"—" denotes a recording that did not chart or was not released in that territory.

=== Guest appearances ===
List of non-single guest appearances, with other performing artists, showing year released and album name
| Title | Year | Other artist(s) | Album |
|---|---|---|---|
| "Opp Pack" | 2021 | 42 Dugg | Free Dem Boyz (Deluxe) |
| "Da Drop" | 2021 | GMO Stax | Youngest Pit in America (Deluxe) |
| "Opp Party" | 2022 | Doe Boy, G Herbo | Oh Really |
| "Stepper" | 2022 | Latto | 777 |
| "Undertaker" | 2022 | Money Man | Big Money |
| "Product of the Ghetto" | 2022 | Elvis Presley | Elvis |
| "In the Ghetto (World Turns Remix)" | 2022 | Elvis Presley | Elvis |
| "Yeah Woah" | 2022 | Big Scarr, Gucci Mane | So Icy Gang: The ReUp |
| "It Ain't Safe" | 2022 | DJ Khaled, Kodak Black | God Did |
| "Pop Out" | 2022 | Lil Baby | It's Only Me |
| "Goodfellas" | 2023 | Trippie Redd | Mansion Musik |
| "Pleads" | 2024 | Lil Gnar, Chief Keef | In My Glory |
