= Wick (album) =

Studio album by Nardo Wick
- Released: February 21, 2025
- Genre: Hip-hop; trap
- Length: 43:27
- Label: Flawless; RCA
- Producer: ATL Jacob; Aldae; Astro; Basobeats; Brgndy; Cheeze Beatz; Cubeatz; DB!; Dawizvrd; David x Eli; Daz; Gedo; Go Grizzly; Hazel; Jahmil; Johnny Juliano; Joy!; Juko; Kid Hazel; Klimperboy; Kurtis Wells; Looisey; Luxury; Millaire; Pirate; RAY; Rve; RyFvr; Smatt Sertified; Southside; Trademark; Versa

Nardo Wick chronology
| Who Is Nardo Wick? (2021) | Wick (2025) |

Singles from Wick
- 1. "Hot Boy" Released: March 31, 2023; 2. "Somethin'" Released: February 9, 2024; 3. "Back to Back" Released: April 26, 2024

Wick (stylized in all caps) is the second studio album by American rapper Nardo Wick. It was released on February 21, 2025, by Flawless Entertainment and RCA Records. The album features guest appearances by 21 Savage, Future, Lil Baby, Sexyy Red, and Southside.

== Singles ==
The album's lead single, "Hot Boy" featuring Lil Baby, was released on March 31, 2023. The second single, "Somethin'" featuring Sexyy Red, was released on February 9, 2024. The third single, "Back to Back" featuring Future and Southside, was released on April 26, 2024.

== Track listing ==
Wick track listing
| No. | Title | Writer(s) | Producer(s) | Length |
|---|---|---|---|---|
| 1. | "Glitchin" | Basil von Stietencron; Horace Walls; Joshua Luellen; Oleksandr Poda; Smatt Sertified | Basobeats; Pirate; Smatt Sertified; Southside | 2:06 |
| 2. | "Hello" | Arthur Schwartz; Carter Bryson; Walls; Howard Dietz; Jacob Sclaver; Jesse Morris; Luke Comeon | Juko | 2:57 |
| 3. | "Gangsta" | Abhinav Pemmasani; Ahmar Bailey; Astro; Walls; Levon Bilbulyan; Lychkin Nikita Vladmirovich | Astro; Brgndy; Gedo; Kid Hazel | 2:42 |
| 4. | "I Don't Think" | Walls; Jahmil Leonard | Jahmil | 2:25 |
| 5. | "HBK" (featuring 21 Savage) | Bailey; Shéyaa Bin Abraham-Joseph; David Ruoff; Elias Klughammer; Walls | David x Eli; Kid Hazel | 3:49 |
| 6. | "Get on My Nerves" | Abdallah Ahmad; Emile Hilaire; Walls; Kevin Gomringer; Simon Gaudes; Tim Gomringer | Cubeatz; Klimperboy; Millaire; Rvei | 2:09 |
| 7. | "Ain't No Lettin' Up" | Bailey; Walls; Jonas Lee; Morris; Mark Nikolaev | Kid Hazel | 2:28 |
| 8. | "Beatbox" | Walls; Tyler David Maline | Trademark | 2:14 |
| 9. | "A Lil Different" | Walls; Jacob Canady | ATL Jacob | 2:16 |
| 10. | "Back to Back" (featuring Future and Southside) | Davud Ahmedzade; Walls; Luellen; Luis J. Diaz; Nayvadius Wilburn | Daz; Looisey; Southside | 3:05 |
| 11. | "Goodboy vs Badboy" | Bokyu Kim; Darryon Aaron Bunton; Walls; Luis Gärdes; Ryan Mitchell Leash; Sam Toussi | DB!; Dawizvrd; Luxury; RyFvr; Versa | 2:17 |
| 12. | "Drew" | Walls; RAY; Ruth Berhe; Maline | RAY; Trademark | 4:28 |
| 13. | "Have All of Me" | Gregory Hein; Walls; John Julian; Joseph Hill, Jr.; Kurtis Wells | Aldae; Johnny Juliano; Kurtis Wells | 2:11 |
| 14. | "Why Hate" | Christie McVie; Hilaire; Walls; Gomringer; Olivia Joy McCarty; Gaudes; Tom Gomringer | Cubeatz; Joy!; Klimperboy; Millaire | 3:00 |
| 15. | "Hot Boy" (featuring Lil Baby) | Darryl McCorkell; Dominique Jones; Walls; Irvin Whitlow; Josiah Muhammad; Kevin Andre Price | Cheeze Beatz; Go Grizzly | 2:51 |
| 16. | "Somethin'" (featuring Sexyy Red) | Bailey; Walls; Janae Wherry | Hazel | 2:29 |
| Total length: | | | | 43:27 |
