= Me or Sum =

2021 single by Nardo Wick featuring Future and Lil Baby

Single by Nardo Wick featuring Lil Baby and Future

from the album Who Is Nardo Wick?
- Released: November 29, 2021
- Genre: Dirty rap; trap
- Length: 3:45
- Label: Flawless; RCA
- Songwriters: Horace Walls III; Dominique Jones; Nayvadius Wilburn; Juan Guerreri-Maril; Bigram Zayas; Donny Flores; Emmanuel Dionisopoulos; Xavier Martinez
- Producers: Z3N; DVLP

Nardo Wick singles chronology
"Who Want Smoke?? (Remix)" (2021)	"Me or Sum" (2021)	"Krazy Krazy" (2022)

Future singles chronology
"Too Easy" (2021)	"Me or Sum" (2021)	"M&M" (2021)

Lil Baby singles chronology
"Rich All My Life" (2021)	"Me or Sum" (2021)	"M&M" (2021)

Music video
- "Me or Sum" on YouTube

"Me or Sum" is a song by American rapper Nardo Wick featuring fellow American rappers Future and Lil Baby. It was released on November 29, 2021 as the second single from Wick's debut studio album Who Is Nardo Wick? (2021). The song was produced by Z3N and DVLP.

== Composition and lyrics ==
In the song, the three artists rap about each of their luxurious lifestyles and experiences and attracting women as a result. Particularly, they mention how their romantic partners think they are "me or something". Future delivers the first verse; the beat then switches, shifting to a more aggressive tone, and Future's verse is followed by Nardo Wick and Lil Baby's verses.

== Music video ==
An official music video for the song was released on February 3, 2022. The video was directed by MadeByJames and is set in the Roaring Twenties. It starts with Future rapping in a bedroom and being "distracted by a woman's beauty". Nardo Wick raps in a room (described as a Depression-era juke joint) filled with individuals gambling, drinking and smoking, as well as women. While rapping, he plans out a heist with his crew. During the third verse, Lil Baby and his "lady friend" carry out the heist, stealing cash and jewelry. Baby also raps to a surveillance camera. The three rappers reunite and celebrate their success in the end.

== Charts ==
=== Weekly charts ===
Weekly chart performance for "Me or Sum"
Chart (2021–2022)	Peak position
US Billboard Hot 100	58
US Hot R&B/Hip-Hop Songs (Billboard)	15
US Rhythmic Airplay (Billboard)	35

=== Year-end charts ===
2022 year-end chart performance for "Me or Sum"
Chart (2022)	Position
US Hot R&B/Hip-Hop Songs (Billboard)	41

== Certifications ==
Certifications for "Me or Sum"
Region	Certification	Certified units/sales
United States (RIAA)	2× Platinum	2,000,000^{‡}
^{‡} Sales+streaming figures based on certification alone.

== Release history ==
Release history for "Me or Sum"
Region	Date	Format	Label	Ref.
Various	November 29, 2021	Digital download; streaming	Flawless	
United States	February 22, 2022	Rhythmic contemporary	RCA	
