= Who Want Smoke? =

2021 single by Nardo Wick

Single by Nardo Wick

from the album Who Is Nardo Wick?
- Released: January 22, 2021
- Recorded: 2020
- Genre: Hip hop; trap; gangsta rap; drill
- Length: 2:33
- Label: Flawless; RCA
- Songwriters: Horace Walls III; Mark Onokey
- Producer: Emkay

Nardo Wick singles chronology
"Came Up" (2020)	"Who Want Smoke?" (2021)	"Shhh" (2021)

Music video
- "Who Want Smoke?" on YouTube "Who Want Smoke?" (Remix) on YouTube

"Who Want Smoke?" (sometimes written "Who Want Smoke??"is a song by American rapper Nardo Wick. It was released through Flawless Entertainment and RCA Records as a single on January 22, 2021. The official remix, which features G Herbo, Lil Durk, and 21 Savage, was released on October 8, 2021. The original was certified platinum by the RIAA in November 2021. The song is included on Wick's debut album, Who Is Nardo Wick?, released on December 3, 2021.

The song gained attention for its lyrics "Who want smoke with me?" and "What the fuck is that?", and a stomping dance to the song went viral on TikTok.

== Remix ==
On October 8, 2021, Nardo Wick released a remix of the song, featuring fellow American rappers G Herbo & Lil Durk and Atlanta-based rapper 21 Savage. The remix adds another question mark to the title and was released on G Herbo's 26th birthday. An accompanying music video, directed by Cole Bennett from Lyrical Lemonade, premiered on the same day.

American singer Chris Brown interpolated the chorus of "Who Want Smoke?" for his 2024 diss track "Weakest Link".

== Music videos ==
Two music videos were released for the song. The video for the original song was released alongside its release on January 22, 2021. The video for the remix directed by Cole Bennett was released alongside the song's release on October 8, 2021.

== In media ==
- The song was used in the Netflix-released TV series Nemesis, specifically in the episode "Tête-À-Tête".

== Charts ==
=== Weekly charts ===
Weekly chart performance for "Who Want Smoke??" (Remix)
Chart (2021)	Peak position
Canada Hot 100 (Billboard)	41
Global 200 (Billboard)	37
New Zealand Hot Singles (RMNZ)	15
US Billboard Hot 100	17
US Hot R&B/Hip-Hop Songs (Billboard)	5

=== Year-end charts ===
2022 year-end chart performance for "Who Want Smoke??" (Remix)
Chart (2022)	Position
US Hot R&B/Hip-Hop Songs (Billboard)	28
US Streaming Songs (Billboard)	60

== Certifications ==
Certifications for "Who Want Smoke?"
Region	Certification	Certified units/sales
Canada (Music Canada)	Platinum	80,000^{‡}
New Zealand (RMNZ) Remix with G Herbo, Lil Durk & 21 Savage	Gold	15,000^{‡}
United States (RIAA) Remix with G Herbo, Lil Durk & 21 Savage	3× Platinum	3,000,000^{‡}
United States (RIAA) Solo	Gold	500,000^{‡}
^{‡} Sales+streaming figures based on certification alone.
