= Coochie Brake =

Cypress swamp in Louisiana, US

Coordinates: 31.7883°N 92.8153°W

Coochie Brake is a cypress swamp in Louisiana of more than 700 acres. It is between Verda and Atlanta. This swamp also referred to as a brake is home to alligators, massive cypress trees, deer and much more. Coochie Brake is a colorful local source full of history and folklore dating back to when it was a Spanish fort. Once owned by JM Ferguson, it is now a state owned property.
