= Cyber Sapp =

American record producer and songwriter

- Born: Keldrick Josep Sapp
- Origin: Atlanta, Georgia
- Genres: Hip hop, Southern hip hop
- Occupations: Record producer, songwriter
- Years active: 2001 - present
- Label: Black Cartel

Keldrick Josep Sapp, professionally known as Cyber Sapp is an American record producer and songwriter from Atlanta, Georgia, who is possibly best known for producing Gucci Mane's single "Freaky Gurl". He currently manages Bohagon, who is a part of Sapp's BLACK CARTEL label. He has produced for David Banner, P$C, Bonecrusher, Young Red and Lil Ron, Slim Thug, Paul Wall, 4-IZE, Killer Mike, Soulja Slim and B.G., among others.

== Production discography ==
- BME / WB: Bohagon (What You Want); Trillville (Something In The Air)
- Grand Hustle / Atlantic: P$C (Crankin' In The South & Still I Luv Her); Mac Boney & AK (Act); Petey Pablo (Shorty I'm Tight); Kuntry (Pusha)
- So So Def / Jive: Bone Crusher (Hey Fuck Boy)
- SRC / Universal: David Banner (We Ride Them Caddies); Three 6 Mafia and 8Ball & MJG (Gangsta Walk)
- Sucka Free / Sony: Lil Ron & Yung Redd ft. Killer Mike (Wood Grain); Paul Wall (What They Talking Bout)
- Infallible Records: Fresh ft. Mac Boney and David Banner (Who You Testin'); J.B ft. Bohagon and Mac Boney (Get Some Grind); Tre ft. Marcus (Shoes N' Socks)

In 2012, Sapp produced T. Cash's song "Keep Doing It" featuring Lamar Starzz. In 2014, Starting producing new group out of the Metro Atlanta named Forte' Lingo. New single Remain The Same is the first single of the EP - Speak My Language produced by Cyber Sapp and Scott Supreme. The project will be the first project released under UGOTWAX. UGOTWAX is a digital promotion company which Cyber Sapp and DJ MLK co-own.
