= Bluffin (Gucci Mane song) =

2023 single by Gucci Mane featuring Lil Baby

Single by Gucci Mane featuring Lil Baby

from the album Breath of Fresh Air
- Released: June 15, 2023
- Length: 2:28
- Label: 1017; Atlantic
- Songwriters: Radric Davis; Dominique Jones; Zachary Mullett; Liam McAlister; Indyah McAlister; Alfredo Matteucci
- Producers: Kuttabeatz; LMC; Indyah; ProdBySquare

Gucci Mane singles chronology
"Bands" (2023)	"Bluffin" (2023)	"Married With Millions" (2023)

Lil Baby singles chronology
"Go Hard" (2023)	"Bluffin" (2023)	"Merch Madness" (2023)

Music video
- "Bluffin" on YouTube

"Bluffin" is a song by American rapper Gucci Mane featuring American rapper Lil Baby. It was released on June 15, 2023 with an accompanying music video as the fourth single from the former's sixteenth studio album Breath of Fresh Air. It was produced by Kuttabeatz, LMC, Indyah and ProdBySquare.

== Background ==
In an interview with Zane Lowe on Apple Music 1, Gucci Mane stated the song is his first release since he started focusing on appealing to the younger generation in his music:

Honestly, I feel like it's time for people to start hearing more from me as far as game and advice and my opinion on stuff," he said. "So I feel like now when I do a verse with somebody like Baby, who the kids look up to and listen to, I try to put some game on them instead of just rapping. As far as being an artist, I feel like it's a step forward because I'm confident in the verse. I feel like it is exactly how I was feeling at the time.

== Content ==
The song finds Gucci Mane detailing his troubled past. He also takes aim at music executive and talent manager Wack 100: "I ain't arguin' on no internet, I'm not Wack 100".

== Music video ==
Shot by Jerry Productions, the music video shows the rappers at a suite in Las Vegas. Lil Baby performs his verse as he appears on the rooftop and sits in a swing chair, and wears jewelry. Gucci Mane is seen wearing Prada. The video also contains a clip of a boxing match.

== Response ==
Shortly after the song was released, Wack 100 wrote on Instagram that he would respond with a diss track in two days.

== Charts ==
Chart performance for "Bluffin"
Chart (2023)	Peak position
US Billboard Hot 100	100
US Hot R&B/Hip-Hop Songs (Billboard)	40
