= 06 Gucci =

2023 single by Gucci Mane featuring 21 Savage and DaBaby

Single by Gucci Mane featuring 21 Savage and DaBaby

from the album Breath of Fresh Air
- Released: March 31, 2023
- Genre: Hip hop; trap
- Length: 2:59
- Label: 1017; Atlantic
- Songwriters: Radric Davis; Shéyaa Abraham-Joseph; Jonathan Kirk; Mathias Liyew; Dejan Nikolic
- Producers: Ambezza; Nik Dean

Gucci Mane singles chronology
"Didn't Believe" (2023)	"06 Gucci" (2023)	"Pissy" (2023)

21 Savage singles chronology
"Spin Bout U" (2023)	"06 Gucci" (2023)	"Peaches & Eggplants" (2023)

DaBaby singles chronology
"Hate It or Love It" (2023)	"06 Gucci" (2023)	"Shake Sumn" (2023)

Music video
- "06 Gucci" on YouTube

"06 Gucci" is a song by American rapper Gucci Mane featuring British-American rapper 21 Savage and fellow American rapper DaBaby. It was released as the second single from his sixteenth studio album Breath of Fresh Air, on March 31, 2023 via 1017 and Atlantic Records. It was produced by Ambezza and Nik Dean.

== Background ==
On March 15, 2023, Gucci Mane previewed the song on Instagram. The single's cover art features him recreating the photo used on the cover art for his 2005 debut album Trap House.

== Content ==
The song revolves around Gucci Mane reminiscing on his lifestyle in the mid-2000s and returning to his old ways; he also alludes to a 2005 incident in which he killed a man known as Pookie Loc in self-defense: "I feel like it's me in '06 and '07, '08, and even '09 / Still hard to kill, the last nigga tried, go ask him, he didn't survive".

== Charts ==
Chart performance for "06 Gucci"
Chart (2023)	Peak position
US Bubbling Under Hot 100 (Billboard)	21
US Hot R&B/Hip-Hop Songs (Billboard)	42
