= Gucci Mane =

American rapper and music executive (born 1980)

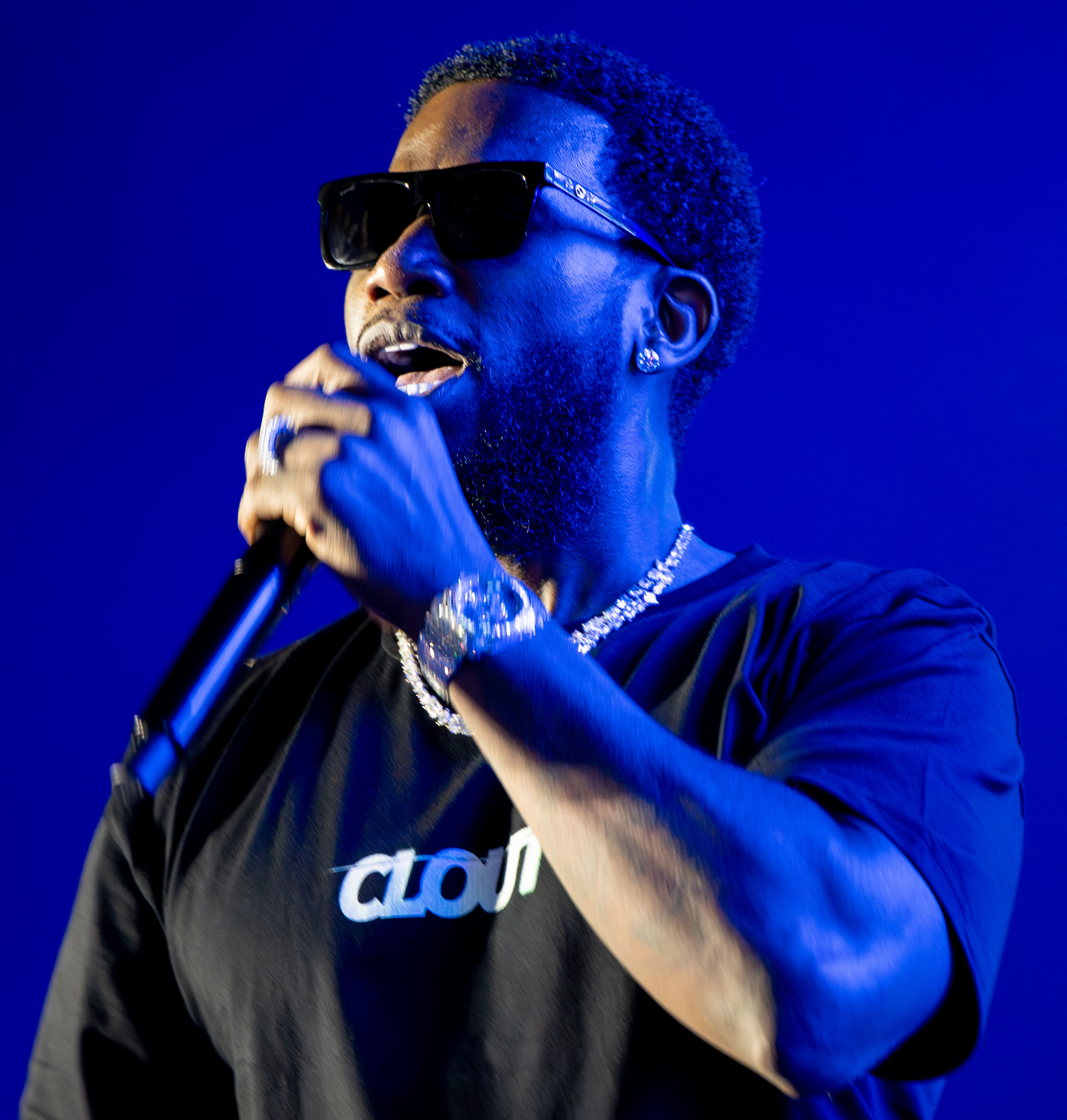
- Gucci Mane performing in 2024
- Born: Radric Delantic Davis; February 12, 1980 (age 46); Bessemer, Alabama, US
- Other names: Guwop; Mr. Zone 6; Wizop; East Atlanta Santa; LaFlare
- Occupations: Rapper; songwriter; music executive; actor
- Years active: 2001–present
- Agent: Paradigm Talent Agency
- Spouse: Keyshia Ka'Oir (m. 2017)
- Children: 3
- Awards: Full list
- Musical career
- Origin: Atlanta, Georgia, US
- Genres: Southern hip-hop; trap
- Works: Gucci Mane discography
- Labels: GUWOP; 1017; Atlantic; RBC; Asylum; Warner Bros.; Tommy Boy; Big Cat
- Website: guccimaneonline.com

Radric Delantic Davis (born February 12, 1980), known professionally as Gucci Mane, is an American rapper and music executive. He is credited, along with fellow Atlanta-based rappers T.I. and Jeezy, with pioneering the hip-hop subgenre trap music for mainstream audiences during the 2000s. His debut studio album, Trap House (2005), was released by the independent label Big Cat Records and entered the Billboard 200; it was followed by Hard to Kill (2006), which spawned his first Billboard Hot 100 entry with its single "Freaky Gurl". That same year, he released his third album, Trap-A-Thon, before signing with Atlantic Records to release his fourth album, Back to the Trap House (2007).

During this time, Davis continued self-releasing mixtapes and collaborative projects. He signed with Atlantic's sister label, Warner Bros. Records to release his sixth album and mainstream breakthrough, The State vs. Radric Davis (2009). Preceded by the double platinum-certified single "Lemonade", it peaked within the top ten of the Billboard 200, while the album's sequel, The Appeal: Georgia's Most Wanted (2010), peaked at number four. Following a two year incarceration between 2014 and 2016, he re-emerged with several commercial projects beginning with his ninth album, Everybody Looking (2016), which peaked at number two on the Billboard 200. He guest appeared on Rae Sremmurd's 2016 single "Black Beatles", which became his first song to peak atop the Billboard Hot 100.

Gucci Mane has released sixteen studio albums and seventy-one mixtapes since 2001. He founded the Atlantic Records-distributed label imprint 1017 Records in 2007, which has signed artists including Young Thug, Waka Flocka Flame, Chief Keef, and Pooh Shiesty. Throughout his career, he has worked with artists including the Weeknd, Drake, Chris Brown, Selena Gomez, Mariah Carey, Usher, and Marilyn Manson. He was nominated for a Grammy Award in 2020.

== Early life ==
=== Growing up: 1980–1993 ===
Radric Delantic Davis was born on February 12, 1980, in Bessemer, Alabama, to former US serviceman and power plant worker Ralph Everett Dudley (born 1955), and social worker and teacher Vicky Jean Davis (born 1955). Davis's family had a strong military background. His paternal grandfather, James Dudley Sr. served in the military for twelve years, including during World War II, as a chef, and his maternal grandfather, Walter Lee Davis, served in the Pacific during World War II and on the USS South Dakota. Davis's father also served in the military, being stationed in Korea for two years.

Davis's parents met in 1978; Davis's mother already had a son, Victor Davis, from another relationship. When Davis was born, his father was on the run from the police for dealing crack cocaine and heroin, and had fled to Detroit, Michigan. Davis's father was not present to sign the birth certificate, and Davis took his mother's last name.

Growing up, Davis was raised by his paternal grandmother while his mother attended college to get her degree. Davis's mother was a teacher who taught him to read at a young age, and spent most of her time teaching him scriptures from the Bible. Davis's first school was Jonesboro Elementary, where he attended kindergarten and the first several grades of elementary school. His older half-brother Victor introduced Davis to hip-hop when Davis was six years old by bringing Davis to a Run-DMC, Beastie Boys and LL Cool J concert. Before moving to Atlanta with his mother, Davis had a distant relationship with his father, who would visit at irregular intervals; the visits stopped when Davis's father had two children with another woman and began to prioritize his children in Atlanta over Davis. Davis would later use a nickname given to his father, "the Gucci Man", as his stage name.

Davis moved with his single mother to Atlanta when he was nine years old due to family problems in Bessemer. Davis's mother had a boyfriend in Atlanta and planned to move in with him, but she decided otherwise at the last minute. They later moved in with someone Davis's mother met in church. Davis's family was kicked out of the house and did not have a stable living environment until his father set them up in a Knights Inn motel. Davis grew up in an area which was high in crime.

Davis's mother moved Davis and Victor to East Atlanta and Davis attended Cedar Grove Elementary School. He was generally good in school and considered himself athletic although he did not participate in school sports. Davis dealt drugs, mainly selling cannabis with his older brother. Davis sold cannabis on his own and ended up using his Christmas money to acquire crack cocaine while in the eighth grade, starting his career as a drug dealer.

=== Time as a drug dealer: 1993–2001 ===
By the time Davis’ part-time drug-dealing became a career, he was a freshman at Ronald E. McNair High School, where he got good grades and was popular among his peers. He did not take drugs for the first few years that he was dealing drugs, and his first experience smoking cannabis was with a high school crush. During this time one of Davis' friends was his later collaborator, OJ da Juiceman, and the two would freestyle rap together.

Even though Davis had been selling drugs for nearly two years by 1995, he had never encountered violence. When he was 15, Davis was riding his push bicycle when a man stopped him and pointed a Desert Eagle at his head. The man took all of Davis’ valuables. and began to carry a .380 caliber handgun. Davis had numerous other life-threatening situations, including a feud with a local street gang who called themselves "the East Shoals Boys" in 1997. The feud resulted in Davis's friend Javon being beaten close to death and adult men walking into McNair High School looking for Davis. The feud resolved itself when Davis and several friends got into a fistfight with members of the East Shoals Boys, who left Davis alone from that point on.

In 1998, Davis graduated from high school with a 3.0 GPA and a HOPE Scholarship to Georgia Perimeter College. He took a computer programming course, though he rarely attended, and he was expelled in 2001 after being caught in possession of crack cocaine by an undercover police officer. Davis was sentenced to 90 days in a county jail and then probation.

=== Pursuing music: 2001–2005 ===
Davis enjoyed writing poetry at a young age, and began rapping at the age of 14. Following his first arrest, Davis began to take music seriously and released La Flare on Str8 Drop Records. It was pressed onto about 1000 CDs and distributed throughout East Atlanta. Following the release of La Flare, and being inspired by Master P, Davis decided he wanted to start a music label. Davis began to manage rapper Lil Buddy in 2001. In 2002, Davis linked up with SYS Records as a member of the Sign Yourself Click. Davis also linked up with producer Zaytoven and made his own label, LaFlare Entertainment.

After heading to New York in search of a distribution deal and returning home empty, he was introduced to Big Cat, the head of Big Cat Records. Ultimately deciding to form an alliance with the label that brought Khia to prominence, Davis released the song "Black Tee", a response to the Dem Franchize Boyz hit record, "White Tee", as well as a collaboration with fellow rising local rapper Young Jeezy with "So Icy." Securing a distribution deal with Tommy Boy Records, Davis continued to work the underground while preparing for the release of his debut album.

== Career ==
=== 2005–2006: Trap House and Hard to Kill ===
In 2005, Davis released his independent debut album entitled Trap House, which featured the single "Icy" with Young Jeezy. Disputes over the rights to this single caused a rift between the two artists. Trap House was considered a success for an independent artist. The album crept into the Top 20 of the Billboard R&B/Hip-Hop Albums charts and landed at the top spot on the Billboard Heatseekers Album chart. Guest appearances include Bun B, Killer Mike, Lil Scrappy, Jody Breeze and Khujo of Goodie Mobb. Hard to Kill followed in 2006. It included the hit single "Freaky Gurl", which peaked at number 12 on the Hot Rap Tracks, number 19 on the Hot R&B/Hip-Hop Songs, and at number 62 on the Billboard Hot 100. He also shot videos for the tracks "Street Nigazzz" and "Pillz".

In 2006, Davis released the mixtape Chicken Talk, beginning a series of mixtapes in the late 2000s. Chicken Talk has come to be recognized as one of hip-hop's best albums by outlets such as Pitchfork and Rolling Stone Australia.

=== 2007–2010: Mixtapes, Back to the Trap House, The State vs. Radric Davis ===
The official remix of "Freaky Gurl" featuring Ludacris and Lil' Kim was included on his 2007 commercial debut album, Back to the Trap House. Gucci Mane appeared on OJ da Juiceman's "Make Tha Trap Say Aye" and began working on various mixtapes. Following the success of his mixtapes Bird Money and Writing on the Wall, Gucci Mane signed with Warner Bros. Records in May 2009.

He appeared on remixes of the songs "Boom Boom Pow" by The Black Eyed Peas, "Obsessed" by Mariah Carey and "5 Star Chick" by Yo Gotti and made a guest appearance on Mario's "Break Up." He made a total of 17 guest appearances in 2009. Gucci Mane's sixth studio album, The State vs. Radric Davis, was released by Warner Bros. Records on December 8, 2009. Its lead single, "Wasted" featuring Plies, was originally from Gucci Mane's 2009 mixtape Guccimania. It peaked at number 36 on the Hot 100, number 3 on the Hot R&B/Hip-Hop Songs, and number 3 on the Rap Songs, making it Gucci Mane's most successful single to date. The second single was "Spotlight" featuring Usher. The third single was "Lemonade." The fourth single was "Bingo", featuring Waka Flocka Flame and Soulja Boy. On October 2, 2009, Gucci Mane was listed at number 6 on MTV's annual Hottest MC in the Game list.

=== 2010–2012: The Appeal: Georgia's Most Wanted and other projects ===
After being released from jail, Gucci Mane stated that he would start or change the label name from So Icey Entertainment to 1017 Brick Squad Records. The Appeal: Georgia's Most Wanted, was released on September 28, 2010. The first single from this release was "Gucci Time", produced by and featuring Swizz Beatz. It premiered on Gucci Mane's MySpace page on August 6 and was released to US urban radio stations on August 24, 2010.

On March 18, 2011, Gucci Mane released his 10th EP, The Return of Mr. Zone 6, mostly produced by Drumma Boy. It debuted at No. 18 on the Billboard 200, and is his highest charting EP. The album also debuted at no. 2 on the Rap albums chart and No. 8 on the R&B/Hip-Hop Albums chart. He also released a collaboration album with Waka Flocka Flame named Ferrari Boyz on August 5, Gucci Mane's first collaboration album. Its first single was "She Be Puttin On" featuring Brick Squad labelmate Slim Dunkin. Ferrari Boyz debuted at No. 21 on the Billboard 200. Gucci Mane released another collaboration album, this time with rapper V-Nasty, called BAYTL, on December 13. The album's first single was "Whip Appeal" featuring P2theLA.

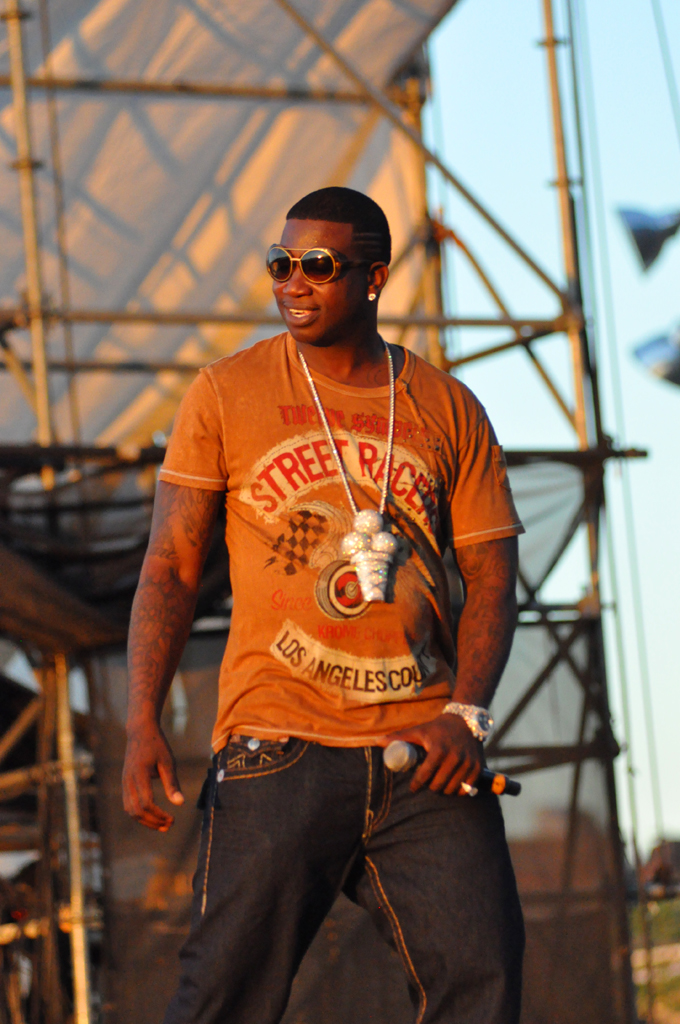
Gucci Mane performing on August 29, 2010

Three days after BAYTL's release, while traveling to the video shoot of "Push Ups", Slim Dunkin, who was featured on the song, was shot and killed after an argument at an Atlanta recording studio. On February 5, 2012, Gucci Mane released his Trap Back mixtape. It features guest appearances from Yo Gotti, Rocko, Waka Flocka Flame, Jadakiss, 2 Chainz, and Future, the latter three appearing on the third studio album of Jeezy (who had removed the "Young" from his name) Thug Motivation 103: Hustlerz Ambition. The first single was the mixtape's title track. Music videos were filmed for the songs "Quiet", "Face Card", "In Love With a White Girl" featuring Yo Gotti, "Chicken Room" featuring Rocko, the title track, and "Sometimes" featuring Future. Trap Back was met with positive reviews, scoring a 7.8 from Pitchfork Media, a 7.5 from AllHipHop, and an "L" from XXL.

On May 25, 2012, Gucci Mane released another mixtape, I'm Up. Music videos were released for the songs "Supa Cocky", "Kansas" featuring Jim Jones, "Wish You Would" featuring Verse Simmonds, and "Too Damn Sexy" featuring Jeremih. Gucci Mane released yet another mixtape, Trap God, on October 17, 2012. The mixtape included features from Brick Squad affiliate Waka Flocka Flame and frequent collaborators Rick Ross, Future, Meek Mill and Birdman, among others. On September 13, 2012, he appeared on Waka Flocka Flame's mixtape Salute Me Or Shoot Me 4 on two tracks.

=== 2013: Trap House III and The State vs. Radric Davis II: The Caged Bird Sings ===
On February 12, 2013, Gucci Mane released his mixtape Trap God 2. By the end of March, Gucci Mane released three more mixtapes – Free Bricks 2 with Young Scooter, Trap Back 2 and EastAtlantaMemphis with Young Dolph. Gucci Mane announced in February 2013 that he was releasing a new studio album entitled Trap House III, the third installment of his Trap House series. It was released on May 21, 2013. On May 31, 2013, Gucci Mane also announced he was releasing a new album entitled Mr. GuWop later that year, featuring appearances by personal friend and industrial rock performer Marilyn Manson, who also helped him to give shape to the album's sound and musical direction. On June 5, 2013, Gucci Mane announced that 1017 Brick Squad would release their first group compilation album, Big Money Talk, in 2013.

On September 7, 2013, various members of 1017 Brick Squad and Brick Squad Monopoly traded shots back and forth on Twitter, including Gucci Mane, Waka Flocka Flame, Frenchie, Wooh Da Kid, and OJ da Juiceman. Gucci Mane would go on to say "fuck brick squad" and accuse his former manager, Waka Flocka Flame's mother Debra Antney, of stealing money from OJ da Juiceman and French Montana. Frenchie also accused Gucci Mane of paying for Young Vito's lawyer, the accused murderer of former 1017 Brick Squad artist Slim Dunkin, which Gucci Mane denied. Frenchie would release a diss record towards Gucci Mane the following day. During the following days, it was revealed that OJ da Juiceman, Young Dolph, Frenchie and Wooh da Kid were no longer, or in some cases had never been, signed to 1017 Brick Squad Records. It was also revealed that 1017 Brick Squad had lost their distribution deal with Atlantic Records, and the label might be disbanded.

On September 9, 2013, Gucci Mane advertised on Twitter that he sold the recording contracts of what he considered his main artists: Waka Flocka Flame, Young Scooter, and Young Thug. During his Twitter tirade he dissed many rappers and producers such as Nicki Minaj, Plies, Drake, Rocko, Polow da Don, 2 Chainz, Rick Ross, Jeezy, T.I., Yo Gotti, Frenchie, 808 Mafia, Waka Flocka Flame and Tyga among others. The following day he released a new single, "Stealing", featuring OJ da Juiceman, produced by Zaytoven. On the song he disses T.I., Jeezy, and Yo Gotti. That night he also released a new mixtape Diary of a Trap God. Following the mixtape's release his barrage of tweets stopped, and he claimed his Twitter account was hacked by his former manager Coach K for $5,000. Subsequently, he deleted all the controversial tweets and hours later deleted his Twitter account.

On September 22, 2013, Gucci Mane admitted to making the tweets, and claimed he was binging on codeine and promethazine during the time. He went on to apologize to the fans, his family, and the music industry members he offended. Gucci Mane also said that he would be going to rehab while incarcerated on his gun charge. Plans to release his album Mr. GuWop were scrapped indefinitely, and Gucci Mane would go on to release his tenth studio album, The State vs. Radric Davis II: The Caged Bird Sings, on Christmas Day 2013.

=== 2014–2016: Incarceration; multiple project releases from prison ===
Gucci Mane released his first music of 2014 on April 20, a free collaborative mixtape with Young Thug called Young Thugga Mane La Flare. He later released another collaborative project with 1017 BrickSquad artists, Brick Factory Vol. 1, on May 24. Then, he released three digital albums on the same day, The Purple Album (with Young Thug), The Green Album (with Migos) and The White Album (with Peewee Longway), collectively known as World War 3D. His eighth digital album, Trap House 4, was released on July 4, 2014. The album features guest appearances from Chief Keef, Young Scooter, K Camp and Fredo Santana.

On July 17, 2014, he released a collaborative album with Young Dolph and PeeWee Longway (labeled as Felix Brothers) called Felix Brothers. On July 22, 2014, Gucci Mane announced that he would release a new album, titled The Oddfather, on the day he would go back to court, July 28, 2014. On August 15, 2014, Gucci Mane released his tenth digital album, Gucci Vs Guwop. Gucci Mane released the follow-up digital album to the mixtape Brick Factory Vol. 1, Brick Factory Vol. 2, on September 3. On September 13, Gucci Mane released a free mixtape, The Return of Mr. Perfect, the follow-up to his mixtape Mr. Perfect. Following his September releases he started promoting Trap God 3, which was released on October 17, 2014, and became the highest-charting release during his prison sentence. On October 31, 2014, Gucci Mane and Chief Keef released a collaborative mixtape titled Big Gucci Sosa.

On Christmas Day, Gucci Mane released his 13th mixtape, East Atlanta Santa, featuring artists such as Raury, Shawty Lo and OJ da Juiceman. He capped off the year by teaming up with producer Honorable C Note for a Christmas mixtape, C-Note Vs. Gucci, a compilation of old collaborations between the two and new records. In total, he released over twelve projects in 2014 and made over $1,300,000 from prison.

Gucci Mane released his 14th mixtape on January 3, 2015, 1017 Mafia: Incarcerated. On his birthday, February 12, 2015, he released the third installment of his Brick Factory series, Brick Factory 3. Soon after, on February 18, 2015, Gucci Mane released a surprise EP, Views From Zone 6. The title is a play on words on the upcoming album from Drake Views From The 6. Gucci Mane released a triple digital album for the third time on March 20, 2015: Breakfast, Lunch and Dinner. It includes guest features from iLoveMakonnen, Waka Flocka Flame, Chief Keef, Rich The Kid, Andy Milonakis and others. Four days later, Gucci Mane released a follow-up EP entitled Dessert, containing production from Mike Will Made It and Honorable C-Note.

On April 6, 2015, Gucci Mane released the final installment of his Trap House series, Trap House 5 (The Last Chapter), the first installment in the series to be released as a mixtape. Production was handled by Mike Will Made It, Zaytoven and Honorable C-Note, and it had guest features from Young Thug, Peewee Longway and Chief Keef. On May 20, 2015, La Flare released his tenth project of the year, King Gucci, with appearances from Fetty Wap, Migos, PeeWee Longway and RiFF RAFF and production from Chief Keef, TM88, Metro Boomin, and Zaytoven. On December 25, 2015, Gucci Mane released a mixtape titled East Atlanta Santa 2.

On April 26, 2016, Gucci Mane released a 36-track compilation album on iTunes consisting of his Breakfast, Lunch, Dinner, and Dessert projects called Meal Ticket.

=== 2016–2018: Release, Everybody Looking, The Return of East Atlanta Santa, Mr. Davis & Evil Genius ===
On May 26, 2016, Gucci Mane was released from prison five months early: it was ruled that the five months he had spent in prison waiting for his trial had not yet been deducted from his sentence when they should have been. The next day, Gucci Mane released the first single under his new deal with Atlantic Records, "First Day Out tha Feds". On June 3, 2016, Gucci Mane appeared on "Champions", the first single off of GOOD Music's Cruel Winter album. On June 17, 2016, Gucci Mane made his first performance since being released from prison at the Elan Mansion, an Atlanta club. On June 25, 2016, he announced his ninth studio album and first since his release from prison, Everybody Looking, which was released on July 22, 2016. One day later he headlined the "Gucci & Friends" concert at the Fox Theatre in Atlanta; the show featured Fetty Wap, 2 Chainz, Future and Drake.

In September 2016, Gucci Mane collaborated with Rae Sremmurd on the single "Black Beatles", which in November 2016 reached number one on the Billboard Hot 100, Gucci Mane's first number-one single as a featured artist. The song was described by Billboard as the "unexpected commercial high point for Gucci" as it topped the Billboard Hot 100 for 7 non-consecutive weeks between November 2016 and January 2017.

He released Woptober on October 14, 2016, and released a side project called Free Bricks 2 with Future. On November 23, 2016, Gucci Mane and Lil Uzi Vert released a collaborative 7-track EP, "1017 vs. The World".

His tenth studio album, "The Return of East Atlanta Santa", was released on December 16, 2016. On May 26, 2017, Gucci Mane released Droptopwop, a collaborative mixtape with Metro Boomin. The 10-track mixtape features Rick Ross, Offset of Migos, Young Dolph and 2 Chainz.

In August 2017, Gucci Mane announced his eleventh studio album, Mr. Davis. The album was released on October 13, 2017. It includes "I Get the Bag" featuring Migos, which peaked at number 11 on the Billboard Hot 100, his most successful single as a solo artist to date.

Two months later, Gucci Mane released his twelfth studio album El Gato: The Human Glacier, produced entirely by Southside. A week after its release, in similar fashion to the announcements of previous projects, Gucci Mane announced his thirteenth album, Evil Genius, released on December 7, 2018.

=== 2019–present: East Atlanta Santa 3, So Icy Summer, So Icy Gang Vol. 1, Delusions of Grandeur, Woptober ll, Ice Daddy, and Breath of Fresh Air ===
In 2019, he released two studio albums, including Delusions of Grandeur and Woptober ll. On July 3, 2020, Gucci Mane released the 24-track So Icy Summer compilation album, marking his first project of 2020, following East Atlanta Santa 3 in 2019. On July 30, he collaborated with rapper Mulatto for the single "Muwop", a play on his moniker "Guwop."

On October 16, 2020, a day before October 17, Gucci Mane released another compilation album with his label 1017 Records, titled So Icy Gang Vol. 1, and credited as Gucci Mane & The New 1017, indicating that new members of the label are featured. In 2021, he released his fifteenth studio album, Ice Daddy.

On November 15, 2022, the rapper released the track and video "Letter to Takeoff", dedicated to the rapper Takeoff. Through 2023, Gucci released about ten singles including "King Snipe", "06 Gucci", "Pissy", "Bluffin", and "There I Go" which all had guest features, along with other non-guest feature songs that appeared on his sixteenth studio album, Breath of Fresh Air released on October 17, 2023.

He released Greatest of All Trappers (Gangsta Grillz Edition), a mixtape in collaboration with DJ Drama, in August 2024. He released his album Episodes on October 17, 2025. The album focuses on his struggles with schizophrenia, bipolar disorder, and recovery from drug addiction. His album Against All Odds released on October 16, 2026. He appeared in the 2026 video game Grand Theft Auto VI as a radio host of Dirty South Classics.

== Other ventures ==
=== Acting career ===
Gucci Mane made his acting debut in the 2012 film Birds of a Feather, co-starring with Producer Zaytoven. The same year, he was featured in Spring Breakers which also featured James Franco, Selena Gomez, Vanessa Hudgens, Ashley Benson and Rachel Korine.

=== Delantic Clothing ===
In May 2016, Gucci Mane began teasing images of his upcoming clothing line called Delantic, which will feature a range of apparel, from T-shirts and hoodies to underwear.

=== Autobiography ===
In September 2017, Davis published his autobiography, The Autobiography of Gucci Mane. The book was written during Davis's time in prison and was authored with Neil Martinez-Belkin, a former XXL Magazine editor. In the weeks before the publication, Davis released a trailer for the book consisting of a short montage directed by videographer Cam Kirk. The Autobiography of Gucci Mane went on to become a New York Times bestseller. The New Yorker said the book "reads like a set of liner notes that try to impose a central order on his life story."

=== Gucci collaboration ===
In 2019, Davis started working with Italian fashion house Gucci. The brand had previously not associated itself with the rapper due to his criminal record and image. After a few years of personal development, which included Davis getting married and improving his fitness, Gucci announced he would be the face of their Gucci Cruise 2020 Campaign.

== Personal life ==
Following his release from prison in 2016, Gucci Mane became the subject of an internet conspiracy theory that stated he was a clone of the "real" Gucci Mane, citing the rapper's new slim physique, a slight change in his voice and his shift towards a healthier lifestyle as supposed proof. Gucci Mane denied that he was a clone and poked fun at the theory in an Instagram post. Davis discussed his newfound sobriety with The New York Times in 2016.

Davis married Keyshia Ka'oir, the founder of Ka'oir Cosmetics and Ka'oir Fitness, in Miami on October 17, 2017. The wedding was paid for by BET which produced an accompanying 10-segment TV series, The Mane Event, depicting wedding preparations and the ceremony. Davis had proposed to Ka'oir after performing at an Atlanta Hawks basketball game. On December 23, 2020, Ka'oir gave birth to their son, Ice Davis. On February 8, 2023, Ka'oir gave birth to their daughter, Iceland Ka'oir Davis.

Davis disclosed in his 2017 autobiography that he has a son born in 2007 whom he had not known about until the child was ten months old.

Davis stated in his 2025 autobiography that he was diagnosed with bipolar disorder and schizophrenia.

== Legal issues ==
=== 2001–2008 ===
In April 2001, Davis was arrested on cocaine charges and sentenced to 90 days in county jail.

On May 10, 2005, Davis was attacked by a group of men at a house in Decatur, Georgia. Davis and his companions shot at the group, killing one. The body of that attacker, Henry Clark, was found later behind a nearby middle school. Davis turned himself in to police investigators on May 19, 2005, and was subsequently charged with murder. Davis claimed that the shots fired by him and his party were in self-defense. The DeKalb County district attorney's office dropped the murder charge in January 2006 due to insufficient evidence. The previous October, in an unrelated matter, Davis had pleaded no contest to a charge of aggravated assault for assaulting a nightclub promoter the previous June; at the time the murder charge was dropped, he was serving a six-month county jail sentence for this. Davis was released from jail in late January 2006.

In September 2008, Davis was arrested for a probation violation for completing only 25 out of 600 community service hours following his 2005 arrest for aggravated assault. He was sentenced to a year in the county jail but was released after six months. He was incarcerated in the Fulton County jail for violating his probation and was released on May 12, 2010.

=== 2010–2011 ===
On November 2, 2010, Gucci Mane was arrested for driving on the wrong side of the road, running a red light or stop sign, damage to government property, obstruction, driving without a license, no proof of insurance, and other traffic charges. He was taken to Grady Memorial Hospital.

On January 4, 2011, a judge in the Superior Court of Georgia's Fulton County ordered Davis to a psychiatric hospital, according to court documents. The documents reveal that his lawyers filed a Special Plea of Mental Incompetency on December 27, arguing that he was unable "to go forward and/or intelligently participate in the probation revocation hearing."

Davis was arrested twice in April 2011 in DeKalb County, on April 13 on one charge of battery, and on April 20 on two charges of aggravated assault with a deadly weapon.

On September 13, 2011, Davis was given a six-month county jail sentence after pleading guilty to two counts of battery, two counts of reckless conduct and one count of disorderly conduct. He was released on December 11, 2011.

=== 2013–2016 ===
On March 22, 2013, the Atlanta Police Department issued a warrant for the arrest of Davis after he allegedly attacked a fan who was trying to take a photo with him. A soldier, "James," claimed that Gucci Mane hit him with a bottle in the head while he was talking to a security guard about getting a photo with the rapper. He was treated at Grady Memorial Hospital and received 10 stitches. Four days later, a second man going by the initials T.J. claimed Gucci Mane punched him in the face when T.J. tried to shake his hand after a concert performance at Club Onyx in Philadelphia. In the early morning of March 27, Davis turned himself in on the aggravated assault charges. He was denied bond and was incarcerated at Fulton County Jail. His lawyer said that witnesses claim Gucci Mane had nothing to do with the assault. He appeared in court on April 9, 2013, and was indicted on one count of aggravated assault. Days later, he posted $75,000 bail, and the following day, April 14, he was arrested again for a parole violation. He was released three weeks later, on May 2, 2013.

On September 13, 2013, Gucci Mane was hanging out with a friend and was behaving "erratically." The friend decided to call the police to address the situation. When the police arrived, Gucci Mane began cursing and threatening them. Authorities took him into custody at 12:05 a.m., and found marijuana and a handgun on him. He was booked on charges of carrying a concealed weapon, possession of marijuana, and disorderly conduct. He was reportedly hospitalized following the arrest. On September 30, 2013, it was revealed that Gucci Mane would serve 183 days in jail on charges of firearm possession by a convicted felon, disorderly conduct, carrying a concealed weapon, and marijuana possession, among others.

On December 3, 2013, Gucci Mane was charged in federal court with two counts of possessing a firearm as a felon. According to the federal prosecutor, Gucci Mane was in possession of two different loaded guns between September 12 and 14, 2013, and was facing up to 20 years in prison.

On May 13, 2014, Gucci Mane pleaded guilty to possession of a firearm by a convicted felon. He agreed to a plea deal that would result in him being in prison until late 2016. According to the Federal Bureau of Prisons, his release date would be September 20, 2016. He served his sentence in the United States Penitentiary in Terre Haute, Indiana. On May 26, 2016, Gucci Mane was released from prison ahead of his scheduled September date because he was only belatedly credited with the time he served while waiting for his court date.

== Feuds ==
=== Young Jeezy ===
In May 2005, Gucci Mane released his first single "Icy", which featured rapper Young Jeezy (now simply known as Jeezy), at the time an upcoming artist as well. Tensions grew when "Icy" was believed to be put on Young Jeezy's debut album Let's Get It: Thug Motivation 101, although it never was. It was put on Gucci Mane's debut album Trap House. Young Jeezy claimed he was never paid his royalties for the song. On May 9, 2005, Young Jeezy released the controversial song "Stay Strapped," placing a $10,000 bounty on Gucci Mane's chain. Gucci Mane responded by stating, "That nigga Young Jeezy, man. That nigga fake."

On May 19, 2005, tensions were soaring between Gucci Mane and Young Jeezy when four men set up Gucci Mane at a stripper's home and attempted to rob him. Gucci Mane grabbed his pistol and shot one of the assailants. The assailant, Pookie Loc, a CTE affiliate of Young Jeezy, was later found buried behind Columbia Middle School in Decatur, Georgia. An official warrant was put out for Gucci Mane's arrest. Days later he turned himself in to police after hearing about the warrant.

During a phone conversation, Gucci Mane stated, "I just want to let everyone know I'm not a murderer. I was upset. I was scared a little bit, but I had to do what I had to do. You gotta be a man about it. I'm not a bad person. I have remorse for everything that happened." Young Jeezy responded to Gucci Mane and the allegations of hiring Pookie Loc to rob Gucci Mane by saying that Gucci Mane was "trying to turn a bad situation into good publicity and sell his record."

On January 17, 2006, prosecutors dropped the murder charge against Gucci Mane as he maintained he was acting out of self-defense. On June 15, 2006, after tensions had cooled, Gucci Mane came at Young Jeezy on the song "745" rapping, "Do I smell pussy? Nah, that's Jeezy. You ain't a snowman, you more like a snowflake, cupcake, corn flake. Nigga, you too fake."

On June 15, 2009, Young Jeezy came at Gucci Mane on the song "24, 23," rapping, "I'm on some Louie shit today, fuck some Gucci, man. These niggas still on my dick, they like some groupies, man. Can't keep they lips closed, they worse than 'Coochies Mane'." In light of the renewed tensions with the Crip-affiliated Young Jeezy, Gucci Mane started associating himself with the Bloods street gang, known rivals of the Crips, with Gucci Mane going on to use Blood imagery in his music videos as well as associating himself with known Blood figures in hip-hop, such as The Game. On December 4, 2009, during a radio interview with DJ Drama and Jeezy, Gucci Mane called in to finally announce a truce between the two, saying, "I'd just like to say, it's way bigger than all of us. I feel like the way the city's been supporting all three of us, they deserve this. It's about that time, man. We're getting older, growing, so let's do it for the city."

On March 24, 2010, members of Gucci Mane's crew 1017 Brick Squad and members of Jeezy's crew Corporate Thugz got into an altercation outside an Atlanta clothing store. Neither Gucci Mane nor Jeezy were present during the altercation. On December 2, 2011, Jeezy explained how the beef originated, stating that Gucci Mane got mad at him because he would not perform "Icy" together; Jeezy said he could not perform the song because he was going through major throat surgery.

On October 10, 2012, during a radio interview, Gucci Mane announced he had no more love for Jeezy due to his controversial fight with rapper Rick Ross. During a radio interview, Jeezy responded by stating, "Man everybody knows that boy is retarded. Ain't nobody taking him seriously. He has an ice cream cone on his face, let's be for real. Given that said, I'm not going back, I'm going forward." On October 15, 2012, Gucci Mane came at Jeezy and other artists on the song "Truth" by rapping, "A ten thousand dollar bounty put on my neck. I hope you didn't pay them cause they didn't have no success" and, "Go dig your partner up, nigga, bet he can't say shit," referring to Pookie Loc.

Over 15 years after their feud had begun, Jeezy and Gucci Mane both appeared in a Verzuz Battle on November 19, 2020. Despite a tense atmosphere, including Gucci Mane dissing Pookie Loc after performing "Truth", the battle ended with the two performing "Icy" together for the first time since 2005, followed by Gucci Mane telling Jeezy "it's all love" and that he "respected him" for proposing the idea.

Gucci Mane would name-drop Pookie Loc again in 2022, rapping, "D.A. dropped my murder, didn’t have evidence to prove it / I think my house is haunted, by who? The ghost of Pookie" on his song "Rumors" featuring Lil Durk.

=== Waka Flocka Flame ===
On March 15, 2013, Gucci Mane announced that frequent collaborator and close friend Waka Flocka Flame was "dropped" from 1017 Brick Squad Records. The two rappers proceeded to throw insults back and forth on Twitter. On March 27, 2013, during an MTV Jams interview with Sway, Waka Flocka Flame explained that he would never do music nor business with Gucci Mane ever again. Neither of the rappers has explained where the controversy originated from. Waka Flocka Flame has stated, "I guess we both be at the finish line we just going our own routes. That's all I can say. What's the reason? Sometimes it's none of your fuckin' business what's the reason. Just understand two men went they own ways but it's no problem."

On November 19, 2013, it was revealed that Gucci Mane had filed a lawsuit against Waka Flocka Flame, Waka Flocka Flame's mother Debra Antney, OJ da Juiceman, rapper Khia Stone and producer Zaytoven. The lawsuit accuses the parties of fraud, racketeering, and breach of contract. According to Gucci Mane, Antney took control of 1017 Brick Squad Records, LLC., without permission, and used it to create three separate offshoot labels. "Gucci is also accusing the parties in the lawsuit of withholding royalties and inflating the cost of label expenditures" and claimed that Antney seized his assets and stole a ring and a necklace. In his lawsuit, Gucci Mane also says that Antney took more than the typical 20% management fee. Gucci Mane also alleged that Antney's actions led to his having money and tax problems.

In early 2017, issues between the two resurfaced when Waka Flocka Flame released the song "Was My Dawg", which many believed referred to Gucci Mane.

=== Others ===
In 2012, Gucci Mane dissed fellow Atlanta rapper Young Joc in a song from his Trap God mixtape, rapping, "I got all eyes on me like Pac did, but I ain't tryin' to go broke like Joc did." During a radio conversation, Joc reacted to the song by stating "Gucci is a master at getting his name in other people's mouths, I ain't trippin', I know what my financial situation is."

On March 16, 2012, R&B singer Keyshia Cole responded to Gucci Mane's mention of her on his Jeezy diss song "Truth", during which he had rapped, "I did a song with Keyshia Cole and I know you still miss her. But Puff was fucking her while you was falling in love with her," implying that, during the time of her rumored relationship with Young Jeezy, Cole was cheating on him with her "Last Night" collaborator Diddy (Note: Also known as Puff, Puff Daddy or Puffy.). Cole stated on the radio, "How you gonna be a G, and you spreading lies, to sell mixtapes! Where your talent at. Dude ain't have to lie though! Could've kept me out of it."

In September 2013, Gucci Mane sent a series of derogatory tweets to various figures in the hip-hop industry. In the tweets he claimed to have had sexual relations with rappers' girlfriends. A couple of days later, Gucci Mane stated that his Twitter account had been hacked. However, he later admitted in his autobiography that he did author the tweets.

In a 2016 interview with the hip-hop radio program The Breakfast Club, Gucci Mane alleged that host Angela Yee had attempted to sleep with him, saying "she done tried ... she was on my dick back then", which Yee strongly denied. Four years later, in October 2019, Gucci Mane claimed that he was banned from The Breakfast Club over these comments, which the hosts discussed and denied on-air. In response, Gucci Mane called Angela Yee a "punk ass bitch" and threatened to "step to" and slap host DJ Envy.

In November 2024, Gucci Mane's ex-girlfriend and former label signee, Mac Bre-Z, went public against the rapper, accusing him of domestic violence, verbal abuse, and unpaid writing credits during the time of their involvement.

== Discography ==
Studio albums

- Trap House (2005)
- Hard to Kill (2006)
- Trap-A-Thon (2007)
- Back to the Trap House (2007)
- Murder Was the Case (2009)
- The State vs. Radric Davis (2009)
- The Appeal: Georgia's Most Wanted (2010)
- The Return of Mr. Zone 6 (2011)
- Everybody Looking (2016)
- The Return of East Atlanta Santa (2016)
- Mr. Davis (2017)
- Evil Genius (2018)
- Delusions of Grandeur (2019)
- Woptober II (2019)
- Ice Daddy (2021)
- Breath of Fresh Air (2023)
- Episodes (2025)

Collaborative albums

- Ferrari Boyz (2011) (with Waka Flocka Flame)
- BAYTL (2011) (with V-Nasty)
- So Icy Boyz (2021) (with 1017)
- Choppers & Bricks (2023) (with B.G.)

== Filmography ==
| Year | Film | Role | Notes |
|---|---|---|---|
| 2007 | No Pad No Pencil | Himself | |
| 2007 | Gucci Mane – Glockumentary DVD | Himself | |
| 2008 | Gucci Mane – Who Framed Radric Davis (DVD) | Himself | |
| 2008 | Hood Affairs – Trap-A-Holic: (Gucci Mane Edition) | Himself | |
| 2009 | Hood Affairs – Gucci Mane – Trap-A-Holic 2 DVD | Himself | |
| 2009 | The Come Up DVD 20 (Gucci Mane Edition) | Himself | |
| 2009 | Money Mafia: Gucci Mane (Street Classic Edition) | Himself | |
| 2010 | Hood Affairs: Gucci Mane – 1017 Brick Squad aka Trap-A-Holic 3 DVD | Himself | |
| 2010 | The Raw Report Presents: Gucci Mane "King of Diamonds DVD" | Himself | |
| 2010 | Gucci Mane x Raw Report – Documentary | Himself | |
| 2010 | Gucci Gone Bonkers DVD | Himself | |
| 2010 | Gucci 3D DVD | Himself | |
| 2011 | Gucci Mane In Wonderland | Himself | |
| 2012 | My Come Up | Himself | |
| 2012 | Birds of a Feather | Himself | |
| 2012 | Spring Breakers | Archie "Big Arch" | |
| 2013 | Gucci Mane – The Lost Footage | Himself | |
| 2017 | The Spot | Himself | |

== Awards and nominations ==
=== BET Awards ===
| Year | Nominee / work | Award | Result | Ref. |
|---|---|---|---|---|
| 2017 | "Black Beatles" (with Rae Sremmurd) | Coca-Cola Viewers' Choice Award | Nominated | |
| 2017 | "Black Beatles" (with Rae Sremmurd) | Best Collaboration | Nominated | |
| 2017 | "Party" (with Chris Brown & Usher) | Best Collaboration | Nominated | |

=== BET Hip Hop Awards ===
| Year | Nominee / work | Award | Result | Ref. |
|---|---|---|---|---|
| 2017 | "Black Beatles" (with Rae Sremmurd) | Best Collabo, Duo or Group | Nominated | |
| 2017 | "Black Beatles" (with Rae Sremmurd) | Sweet 16: Best Featured Verse | Nominated | |
| 2017 | Droptopwop | Best Mixtape | Nominated | |

=== Grammy Awards ===
| Year | Nominee / work | Award | Result | Ref. |
|---|---|---|---|---|
| 2020 | "Exactly How I Feel" (with Lizzo) | Best R&B Performance | Nominated | |

=== iHeartRadio Music Awards ===
| Year | Nominee / work | Award | Result | Ref. |
|---|---|---|---|---|
| 2018 | "do re mi" (with Blackbear) | Best Remix | Nominated | |

=== MTV Video Music Awards ===
| Year | Nominee / work | Award | Result | Ref. |
|---|---|---|---|---|
| 2017 | "Down" (with Fifth Harmony) | Best Pop Video | Won | |
| 2017 | "Down" (with Fifth Harmony) | Best Choreography | Nominated | |
| 2017 | "Down" (with Fifth Harmony) | Song of the Summer | Nominated | |
