= Hoochie coochie =

Term for several belly dance-like dances

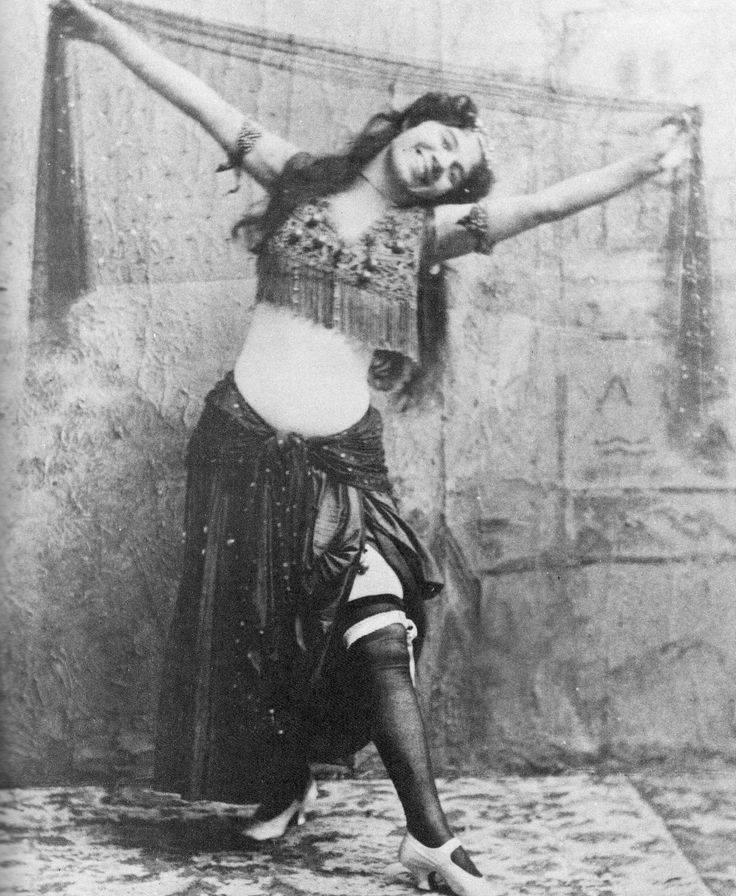
Ashea Wabe belly dancing as "Little Egypt". 1890s.

The hoochie coochie (/ˌhuːtʃi ˈkuːtʃi/) is a catch-all term to describe several sexually provocative belly dance-like dances from the mid-to late 1800s. Also spelled hootchy-kootchy and a number of other variations, it is often associated with "The Streets of Cairo, or the Poor Little Country Maid" song, also known as "the snake charmer song". "Hoochie Coochie Man" (originally titled "I'm Your Hoochie Cooche Man") is also a blues standard written by Willie Dixon and first recorded by Muddy Waters in Chicago circa January 7, 1954. Numerous cover versions of the vintage song continue to be recorded. Hoochie Coochie is also mentioned in Alan Jackson's hit country music song "Chattahoochee", where he says it refers to "a country fair strip show", and in the Jerry Leiber and Mike Stoller songs "Little Egypt (Ying-Yang)" and "Saved" (sung by LaVern Baker). The Ohio Players' 1976 song "Who'd She Coo" is a take-off on the wording.

== Overview ==
Such dances, or something similar, were performed at the Crystal Palace Exhibition in London (UK) in 1851, the Centennial Exhibition in Philadelphia in 1876, and the World's Fair in Paris in 1889. Although such dances became wildly popular in the United States during the Chicago World's Fair in 1893, there is no evidence of them being known by the name "Coochie Coochie" at the time. Before, during and immediately after the fair, these dances were frequently called, "Mussel dance", "stomach dance", danse du ventre and sometimes, "Kouta Kouta". The transition from "kouta kouta" to "coochie coochie", and later, "hoochie coochie", may have been influenced by the expressions, "hoochy, coochy, coochy", "kutchy, kutchy", or "kutchy, kutchy coo", which were found in popular song lyrics from the 1860s and the 1880s.

Described by the New York Journal in 1893 as "Neither dancing of the head nor the feet", it was a dance performed by women of, or presented as having, West Asian and/or Romani heritage, often as part of traveling sideshows.

The hoochie coochie replaced the much older can-can as the ribald dance of choice in New York dance halls by the 1890s.

A carnival company recently rented a large open space in a New York town of 5000 population and opened up for business. The most lucrative part of their business is a "girl" show, too foul to write of. The barker in his endeavor to secure customers appeals to all that is opposed to decency, while the three main attractions emphasize his harangue by "hoochie-coochie" dances and other physical contortions.

—The Social Hygiene Bulletin, Vol. VII, No. 7, July 1920

Since the dance was performed by women, female impersonators or drag queens, a goochie man, or hoochie coochie man, either watched them or ran the show. Alternatively, from the directly sexual meaning of goochie goochie, he was successful with women. The dance was still popular at the Louisiana Purchase Exposition: the World's Fair of 1904, and is even mentioned in the song "Meet Me in St. Louis, Louis", but had all but disappeared by the Second World War.

== Spelling variations ==
Pronounced /ˌhuːtʃi ˈkuːtʃi/ or hüchē¦küchē according to Merriam-Webster's dictionary definition, the words can be found in literature with a number of alternate spellings:

- Hoochie: hootchy, hootchey, hootchie, hoochy, hoochey,
- Coochie: kootchy, kootchey, kootchie, koochy, koochey, cootchy, cootchey, cootchie, coochy, coochey,
