= 25 to Life (album) =

Studio album by Pimp Squad Click
- Released: September 20, 2005
- Recorded: 2004–2005
- Studios: P$ West Studios (Atlanta, GA); Stankonia Recording (Atlanta, GA)
- Genres: Southern hip hop; gangsta rap; trap
- Length: 1:07:53
- Labels: Grand Hustle; Atlantic
- Producers: Big Reese; Crown Kingz Productions; Cyber Sapp; DJ Montay; Keith Mack; Khao; Lil' Jon; Tony Galvin

T.I. chronology
Urban Legend (2004)	25 to Life (2005)	King. (2006)

Big Kuntry King chronology
25 to Life (2005)	My Turn to Eat (2008)

Singles from 25 to Life
- 1. "I'm a King" Released: July 22, 2005

Professional ratings
Review scores
Source	Rating
AllHipHop	3/5 stars
AllMusic	3.5/5 stars
RapReviews	5/10

25 to Life is the debut studio album by American Southern hip hop quintet Pimp Squad Click. It was released in September 20, 2005 via Grand Hustle/Atlantic Records. The album's title refers to the average age of the group members at the time.

Production was handled by Tony Galvin, Keith Mack, Big Reese, Crown Kingz, Cyber Sapp, DJ Montay, Kevin "Khao" Cates and Lil' Jon, with Jason Geter and T.I. serving as executive producers. It features guest appearances from Young Dro, CeeLo Green, Lloyd, Young Jeezy and Lil' Scrappy.

The album debuted at number 10 on the Billboard 200, number 4 on the Top R&B/Hip-Hop Albums and number 3 on the Top Rap Albums charts in the United States. The album stayed on the Billboard 200 for 6 weeks.

Its lead single, "I'm a King", peaked at No. 67 on the Billboard Hot 100, No. 16 on the Hot R&B/Hip-Hop Songs, No. 14 on the Hot Rap Songs in the US, and was certified Gold by the Recording Industry Association of America on June 14, 2006. Its remix version, as well as "Murder Game", appeared in Hustle & Flow: Music from and Inspired by the Motion Picture. An accompanying music video for "I'm a King (Remix)" features scenes from Craig Brewer's 2005 drama film Hustle & Flow. Music videos were also directed for "Do Ya Thang", which was featured in 2005 video game Need for Speed: Most Wanted, and "Set It Out".

== Track listing ==
No.	Title	Writer(s)	Producer(s)	Length
1.	"Set It Out"	Harris; Josey; Merrett; Lawal; Thomas; McMasters	Keith Mack	3:56
2.	"Westside"	Josey; Sean Merrett; Harris; Cortez Thomas; Montay Humphrey	DJ Montay	4:44
3.	"Fuck Where Ya From" (featuring Young Jeezy)	Josey; Harris; Jay Jenkins; Galvin	Tony Galvin	4:17
4.	"Do Ya Thing" (featuring Young Dro)	Harris; Josey; Merrett; Akeem Lawal; D'Juan Hart; Thomas; Keith McMasters	Keith Mack	4:26
5.	"Walk This Way" (featuring CeeLo Green)	Josey; Harris; Callaway; Galvin; Ernie Isley; Ronald Isley; O'Kelly Isley Jr.; Rudolph Isley; Marvin Isley; Chris Jasper	Tony Galvin	4:22
6.	"I'm a King"	Harris; Josey; Merrett; Darryl Richardson II; Jonathan Smith; Craig Love; James Phillips	Lil' Jon	3:32
7.	"Like a Movie" (featuring Lloyd)	Josey; Harris; Merrett; Maurice Sinclair; Jasper Cameron	Big Reese; Jasper Cameron (co.)	4:09
8.	"Lookin' Shife"	Josey; Harris; Galvin	Tony Galvin	5:05
9.	"Still I Luv Her" (featuring Young Dro)	Josey; Harris; Merrett; Lawal; Hart; Jason Geter	Cyber Sapp	4:52
10.	"Coming Down"	Josey; Merrett; Galvin	Tony Galvin	5:03
11.	"Mess It Up" (featuring Young Dro)	Josey; Harris; Merrett; Lawal; Thomas; Hart; Michael Davis; Howard White; Nicholas Solis; Marcus Stephens	C.K.P. (Crown Kingz Productions)	4:17
12.	"Touch Something"	Josey; Harris; Galvin	Tony Galvin	3:56
13.	"Murder Game"	Josey; Harris; Merrett; Lawal; McMasters	Keith Mack	5:48
14.	"25 to Life"	Nathaniel Josey; Clifford Harris; Tony Galvin; Thomas Callaway	Tony Galvin	5:00
15.	"#1 Crew"	Josey; Harris; Merrett; Kevin Cates; O'Shea Jackson; Anthony Wheaton; George Clinton Jr.; William Collins; Bernard Worrell	Khao	4:26
Total length:				1:07:53

Sample credits

- Track 5 embodies portions of "All in My Lover's Eyes" written by Ernie Isley, Ronald Isley, O'Kelly Isley Jr., Rudolph Isley, Marvin Isley and Chris Jasper
- Track 15 embodies portions of "Wrong Nigga to Fuck Wit" written by O'Shea Jackson, Anthony Wheaton, George Clinton Jr., William Collins and Bernard Worrell

== Personnel ==
- P$C (Pimp Squad Click)
  - Clifford "T.I." Harris – vocals, executive producer
  - Nathaniel "Mac Boney" Josey – vocals
  - Sean "Big Kuntry King" Merrett – vocals
  - Akeem "AK" Lawal – vocals
  - Cortez "C-Rod" Thomas – vocals
- Jay "Young Jeezy" Jenkins – vocals (track 3)
- D'Juan "Young Dro" Hart – vocals (tracks: 4, 9, 11)
- Thomas "CeeLo Green" Callaway – vocals (track 5)
- Lloyd Polite Jr. – vocals (track 7)
- Tony Galvin – producer (tracks: 1, 3, 5, 8, 10, 12)
- Montay "DJ Montay" Humphrey – producer (track 2)
- Bryan "Keith Mack" McMasters – producer (tracks: 4, 13, 14)
- Jonathan "Lil' Jon" Smith – producer & mixing (track 6)
- Maurice "Big Reese" Sinclair – producer (track 7)
- Keldrick Josep Sapp – producer (track 9)
- Michael Davis – producer (track 11)
- Howard White – producer (track 11)
- Nicholas Solis – producer (track 11)
- Kevin "Khao" Cates – producer (track 15)
- Jasper Cameron – co-producer (track 7)
- Elliot Carter – recording (tracks: 1, 2, 4–6, 8–14)
- Cyrus – recording (tracks: 3, 7, 15)
- Chris Carmouche – recording (track 6)
- Serge Tsai – recording (track 14)
- Jason Geter – recording assistant (tracks: 4, 14), executive producer, A&R
- Julian Vasquez – recording assistant (track 14)
- Ray Seay – mixing (tracks: 1–6, 8, 10, 12, 13, 15)
- Manny Marroquin – mixing (track 7)
- Josh Butler – mixing (tracks: 9, 14)
- Leslie Braithwaite – mixing (track 11)
- Joe Enyce – mastering
- Brian "Big Bass" Gardner – mastering (track 14)
- Greg Burke – art direction
- Phil Knott – photography
- Dave Scott – cover illustration
- Eric Weissman – sample clearance
- Mike Caren – A&R
- Aaron Bay-Schuck – A&R
- Douglas Peterson – A&R
- James Lopez – marketing

== Charts ==
Chart (2005)	Peak position
US Billboard 200	10
US Top R&B/Hip-Hop Albums (Billboard)	4
US Top Rap Albums (Billboard)	3
