= Chris Robinson (director) =

American film director, music video director

- Born: September 28, 1967 (age 59); Edgewood, Maryland, U.S.
- Occupations: Film director; commercial director; music video director
- Years active: 1991–present
- Notable work: ATL

Chris Robinson (born September 28, 1967 in Edgewood, Maryland) is an American film director, commercial director, and music video director. He has directed films such as Netflix original Beats (2019). He has directed commercials for brands such as iPod, Coca-Cola and Verizon, and music videos for songs like "Fallin'" and "You Don't Know My Name" by Alicia Keys, the Grammy nominated video for "One Mic" by Nas, "Roc Boys (And the Winner Is)..." by Jay-Z, and "'03 Bonnie & Clyde" by Jay-Z featuring Beyoncé. Robinson made his debut as a music video director with the 1991 clip "Doo Doo Brown" by 2 Hyped Brothers & a Dog.

He is also known for the creation of the concept "Boost Mobile" ad campaigns featuring rap superstars, such as Kanye West, Ludacris, The Game, Eve, and others.

In 2006, he made his feature film directorial debut with coming-of-age drama ATL, starring T.I. and Big Boi.

Robinson is also a founding partner of RockCorps, an organization that encourages volunteerism in young people, which launched the Boost Mobile RockCorps program in 2005 and Orange RockCorps in 2008.

He was nominated for Video Director of the Year at the BET Awards of 2011 and in 2015.

== Videography (by year) ==
Year	Artist	Song	Notes
1992	2 Hyped Brothers & a Dog	"Doo Doo Brown"	
1996	Tela featuring 8Ball & MJG	"Sho Nuff"	
1997	Frankie Cutlass	"The Cypher: Part 3"	
1997	Melky and Day	"I Got a Love Jones for You"	
1997	Tela	"Tired of Ballin'"	
1997	MJG	"That Girl"	
1997	Lord Tariq and Peter Gunz	"Deja Vu (Uptown Baby)"	
1998	Das EFX	"Rap Scholar"	
1998	Canibus	"Second Round K.O."	
1998	Big Pun featuring Fat Joe	"Twinz (Deep Cover '98)"	
1998	Jagged Edge	"I Gotta Be"	
1998	Three 6 Mafia	"Late Nite Tip"	
1998	Indo G	"Remember Me Ballin'"	
1998	Monifah	"Touch It"	
1998	Geto Boys	"Gangsta (Put Me Down)"	
1998	Gangsta Boo	"Where Dem Dollas At?"	
1999	Fat Joe	"Bet Ya Man Can't (Triz)"	
1999	Ginuwine	"So Anxious"	
1999	TQ	"Better Days"	
1999	Gina Thompson featuring Missy Elliott	"Ya Di Ya"	
1999	Jagged Edge featuring Jermaine Dupri	"Keys to the Range"	
1999	Tash featuring Raekwon	"Rap Life"	
1999	Gerald Levert	"Nothin' to Somethin'"	
1999	DMX featuring Drag-On	"No Love 4 Me"	
1999	Terror Squad	"Tell Me What U Want"	
1999	Mandy Moore	"Candy"	
1999	Ginuwine	"None of Ur Friends Business"	
1999	Rell featuring Amil	"When Will U See"	
1999	Ghostface Killah featuring Raekwon	"Apollo Kids"	
2000	Coco Lee	"Do You Want My Love"	
2000	Jay-Z	"Anything"	
2000	Method Man & Redman	"Y.O.U."	
2000	Kelly Price & Friends	"Love Sets You Free"	
2000	Mya featuring Jadakiss	"The Best of Me"	
2000	Big Pun featuring Donell Jones	"It's So Hard"	
2000	Cuban Link	"Flowers for the Dead"	
2000	Tha Eastsidaz	"Got Beef"	
2000	Kelly Price	"As We Lay"	
2000	Timbaland & Magoo	"We At It Again"	
2000	Big Pun featuring Tony Sunshine	"100%"	
2000	Sisqó	"Incomplete"	
2000	Ruff Endz	"Where Does Love Go From Here"	
2000	Tank	"Freaky"	
2000	Jaheim	"Could It Be"	
2000	3LW	"No More (Baby I'ma Do Right)"	
2000	Memphis Bleek featuring Jay-Z and Missy Elliott	"Is That Your Chick (The Lost Verses)"	
2000	Capone-N-Noreaga	"Y'all Don't Wanna"	
2000	Snoop Dogg	"Snoop Dogg (What's My Name Pt. 2)"	
2000	Joe	"Stutter"	
2000	112	"It's Over Now"	
2000	Doggy's Angels featuring LaToiya Williams	"Baby If You're Ready"	
2001	M.O.P. featuring Busta Rhymes, Remy Ma and Teflon	"Ante Up (Remix)"	
2001	KRS-One	"Hot"	
2001	Shyne featuring Barrington Levy	"Bonnie & Shyne"	
2001	Lil' Mo featuring Fabolous	"Superwoman Pt. II"	
2001	Faith Evans featuring Carl Thomas	"Can't Believe"	
2001	Alicia Keys	"Fallin'"	MTV Video Music Award for Best New Artist in a Video; Nominated: MTV Video Music Award – MTV2 Award; Nominated: NAACP Image Award for Outstanding Music Video
2001	Dream featuring P. Diddy and Kain	"This Is Me (Remix)"	
2001	Tha Alkaholiks	"Best U Can"	
2001	Toni Braxton	"Maybe"	
2001	Tha Eastsidaz	"I Luv It"	
2001	P. Diddy, Black Rob and Mark Curry	"Bad Boy for Life"	Nominated: MTV Video Music Award for Best Rap Video
2001	Musiq Soulchild	"Girl Next Door"	
2001	Nivea	"Don't Mess with the Radio"	
2001	Timbaland & Magoo featuring Fatman Scoop	"Drop"	
2001	Tank	"Slowly"	
2001	Lil Bow Wow, Lil Wayne, Lil Zane, and Sammie	"Hardball"	
2001	T.I.	"I'm Serious"	
2001	Bif Naked	"I Love Myself Today"	
2001	Dave Navarro	"Hungry"	
2001	Faith Evans	"You Gets No Love"	
2001	The Product G&B featuring Carlos Santana	"Dirty Dancin'"	
2001	Cypress Hill	"Trouble"	
2001	Bubba Sparxxx	"Lovely"	
2001	Nate Dogg	"I Got Love"	
2001	Alicia Keys	"A Woman's Worth"	Nominated: MTV Video Music Award for Best R&B Video
2001	Ruff Ryders featuring Jadakiss and Bubba Sparxxx	"They Ain't Ready"	
2001	Angie Stone	"Brotha"	
2001	Method Man & Redman	"Part II"	
2001	Mystikal	"Bouncin' Back (Bumpin' Me Against the Wall)"	
2002	DMX featuring Faith Evans	"I Miss You"	
2002	Glenn Lewis	"Don't You Forget It"	
2002	Busta Rhymes featuring P. Diddy and Pharrell	"Pass the Courvoisier, Part II"	Nominated: MTV Video Music Award for Best Hip Hop Video
2002	Nas	"One Mic"	Nominated: MTV Video Music Award for Video of the Year; Nominated: MTV Video Music Award for Best Rap Video; Nominated: Grammy Award for Best Music Video
2002	Donell Jones	"You Know That I Love You"	
2002	Musiq	"Halfcrazy"	Nominated: MTV Video Music Award – MTV2 Award
2002	Boyz II Men	"The Color of Love"	
2002	Brandy	"Full Moon"	
2002	Jarvis Church	"Shake It Off"	
2002	Ms. Jade	"Big Head"	
2002	Faith Evans featuring Missy Elliott	"Burnin' Up"	
2002	Tweet	"Call Me"	
2002	Swizz Beatz featuring Bounty Killer	"Guilty"	
2002	Lil Bow Wow featuring Jermaine Dupri, Fabolous and Fundisha	"Basketball"	
2002	Glenn Lewis	"It's Not Fair"	
2002	Slum Village	"Tainted"	
2002	Fabolous featuring P. Diddy	"Trade It All, Pt. 2	
2002	Monica	"All Eyez on Me"	
2002	Musiq	"Dontchange"	
2002	Erykah Badu featuring Common	"Love of My Life (An Ode to Hip-Hop)"	Nominated: NAACP Image Award for Outstanding Music Video
2002	WC featuring Snoop Dogg and Nate Dogg	"The Streets"	
2002	Xzibit featuring Nate Dogg	"Multiply"	
2002	Dru Hill	"I Should Be..."	
2002	The Roots featuring Musiq	"Break You Off"	
2002	Jay-Z featuring Beyoncé	"'03 Bonnie & Clyde"	Nominated: MTV Video Music Award for Best Hip Hop Video
2002	Busta Rhymes featuring Spliff Star	"Make It Clap"	
2002	Angie Martinez featuring Kelis	"Take You Home"	
2002	Fabolous	"This Is My Party"	
2003	Snoop Dogg featuring Pharrell and Uncle Charlie Wilson	"Beautiful"	Nominated: MTV Video Music Award for Best Hip Hop Video
2003	Busta Rhymes featuring Mariah Carey and Flipmode Squad	"I Know What You Want"	Nominated: MTV Video Music Award for Best Hip Hop Video
2003	Nas	"I Can"	Nominated: MTV Video Music Award for Best Rap Video
2003	Monica	"So Gone"	
2003	Jay-Z	La-La-La (Excuse Me Miss Again)	
2003	Ginuwine	"In Those Jeans"	
2003	Mary J. Blige featuring Method Man	"Love @ 1st Sight	
2003	50 Cent featuring Snoop Dogg, Lloyd Banks and Young Buck	"P.I.M.P. (Remix)"	Nominated: MTV Video Music Award for Best Rap Video
2003	Javier	"Crazy"	
2003	P. Diddy, Lenny Kravitz, Pharrell Williams and Loon	"Show Me Your Soul"	
2003	Loon featuring Mario Winans	"Down for Me"	
2003	Jay-Z featuring Pharrell Williams	"Change Clothes"	
2003	Mary J. Blige featuring Eve	"Not Today"	
2003	Alicia Keys	"You Don't Know My Name"	
2004	Fefe Dobson	"Everything"	
2004	Carl Thomas	"Make It Alright"	
2004	Mario Winans featuring P. Diddy	"I Don't Wanna Know"	
2004	Slum Village featuring Kanye West and John Legend	"Selfish"	
2004	Mase	"Welcome Back"	
2004	Jadakiss featuring Nate Dogg	"Time's Up"	
2004	Usher	"Confessions Part II"	
2004	Joss Stone	"You Had Me"	
2004	213	"Groupie Luv"	
2004	Jill Scott	"Golden"	
2004	Usher and Alicia Keys	"My Boo"	Nominated: NAACP Image Award for Outstanding Music Video
2004	Twista featuring Faith Evans	"Hope"	
2005	Alicia Keys	"Karma"	MTV Video Music Award for Best R&B Video
2005	Amerie	"1 Thing"	co-directed with Amerie
2005	Faith Evans	"Again"	
2005	Red Café	"All Night Long"	
2005	Brooke Valentine featuring Lil Jon and Big Boi	"Girlfight"	
2005	Fat Joe featuring Nelly	"Get It Poppin'"	
2005	Toni Braxton	"Please"	
2005	Amerie	"Touch"	
2005	Nelly	"'N' Dey Say"	
2006	T.I.	"What You Know"	Nominated: MTV Video Music Award for Best Male Video; Nominated: MTV Video Music Award for Best Rap Video
2006	Santana featuring Sean Paul	"Cry Baby Cry"	
2006	LeToya	"Torn"	
2006	T.I.	"Why You Wanna"	
2006	LeToya	"She Don't"	
2006	Busta Rhymes featuring Rick James	"In the Ghetto"	
2006	T.I. featuring Jamie Foxx	"Live in the Sky"	
2006	Diddy featuring Nicole Scherzinger	"Come to Me"	
2006	JoJo	"Too Little Too Late"	
2006	Pharrell featuring Snoop Dogg	"That Girl"	
2006	Fat Joe featuring Lil Wayne	"Make It Rain"	
2006	Monica	"A Dozen Roses (You Remind Me)"	
2007	Nas featuring Chrisette Michele	"Can't Forget About You"	
2007	Young Jeezy featuring R. Kelly	"Go Getta"	
2007	T.I. featuring Wyclef Jean	"You Know What It Is"	
2007	Bone Thugs-n-Harmony featuring Mariah Carey and Bow Wow	"Lil' L.O.V.E."	
2007	Akon	"Sorry, Blame It on Me"	
2007	Common featuring Lily Allen	"Drivin' Me Wild"	
2007	Wyclef Jean featuring Akon, Lil Wayne and Niia	"Sweetest Girl (Dollar Bill)"	
2007	Nelly	"Wadsyaname"	
2007	Jay-Z	"Roc Boys (And the Winner Is)..."	
2008	Erykah Badu	"Honey"	under the pseudonym Mr. Roboto co-directed with Erykah Badu; MTV Video Music Award for Best Direction; Nominated: Grammy Award for Best Music Video
2008	Jordin Sparks featuring Chris Brown	"No Air"	Nominated: MTV Video Music Award for Best Female Video; Nominated: MTV Video Music Award for Best New Artist in a Video
2008	Busta Rhymes featuring Linkin Park	"We Made It"	
2008	Alicia Keys	"Teenage Love Affair"	
2008	Jennifer Hudson	"Spotlight"	
2008	Alicia Keys	"Superwoman"	
2008	Cassie featuring Lil Wayne	"Official Girl"	
2008	Ludacris featuring Chris Brown and Sean Garrett	"What Them Girls Like"	
2008	Usher	"Trading Places"	
2008	Ne-Yo	"Miss Independent"	Nominated: MTV Video Music Award for Best Male Video
2008	Brandy	"Long Distance"	
2009	Ciara featuring Young Jeezy	"Never Ever"	
2009	T.I. featuring Justin Timberlake	"Dead and Gone"	
2009	Fat Joe featuring Akon	"One"	
2009	Wale featuring Lady Gaga	"Chillin"	
2009	Busta Rhymes featuring Lil Wayne and Jadakiss	"Respect My Conglomerate"	
2009	Flo Rida featuring Nelly Furtado	"Jump"	
2009	Mario featuring Gucci Mane and Sean Garrett	"Break Up"	
2009	R. Kelly featuring Keri Hilson	"Number One"	
2009	Jordin Sparks	"S.O.S. (Let the Music Play)"	
2009	Keri Hilson	"Slow Dance"	
2009	50 Cent featuring Ne-Yo	"Baby by Me"	
2009	50 Cent	"Do You Think About Me"	
2010	Lil Wayne	"On Fire"	
2010	Usher	"Hey Daddy (Daddy's Home)"	
2010	Lil Wayne featuring Eminem	"Drop the World"	
2010	Mary J. Blige featuring Trey Songz	"We Got Hood Love"	
2010	Big Boi	"Shutterbugg"	
2010	Eminem featuring Lil Wayne	"No Love"	
2010	Gucci Mane featuring Swizz Beatz	"Gucci Time"	
2011	Nicki Minaj featuring Drake	"Moment 4 Life"	Nominated: MTV Video Music Award for Best Collaboration
2011	Swizz Beatz featuring Alicia Keys	"International Party"	
2011	Lil Wayne	"How to Love"	
2011	Monica featuring Rick Ross	"Anything (To Find You)"	
2012	Tyga	"Rack City"	co-directed by Lil Chris Robinson
2012	Jennifer Hudson featuring Ne-Yo and Rick Ross	"Think Like a Man"	
2012	K'naan featuring Nelly Furtado	"Is Anybody Out There?"	Nominated: MuchMusic Video Award for Best Rap Video
2012	Brandy & Monica	"It All Belongs to Me"	
2012	Ne-Yo	"Burning Up"	
2012	Rick Ross featuring Usher	"Touch'N You"	
2012	Nas	"Daughters"	
2012	Andy Allo	"People Pleaser"	
2012	Prince	"Rock and Roll Love Affair"	
2013	A$AP Rocky featuring Skrillex	"Wild for the Night"	
2013	Alicia Keys featuring Maxwell	"Fire We Make"	Nominated: NAACP Image Award for Outstanding Music Video
2014	Estelle	"Make Her Say (Beat It Up)"	
2014	Ne-Yo featuring Young Jeezy	"Money Can't Buy	
2015	T.I. featuring Young Jeezy and Watch the Duck	"G' Shit"	
2019	Chris Brown featuring Drake	"No Guidance"	
2020	Alicia Keys	"Perfect Way to Die"	
2020	Usher	"Bad Habits"	

- DMX - "Lord Give Me a Sign"
- Fat Joe featuring Puff Daddy - "Don Cartagena"
- Gilbere Forte - "Black Chukkas"
- J. Holiday - "Be with Me"
- Jamie Foxx featuring Drake - "Fall for Your Type"
- Keri Hilson featuring Kanye West and Ne-Yo - "Knock You Down" (2009)
- Keyshia Cole and Monica - "Trust" (2009)
- Lil' Mo - "Gangsta (Love 4 the Streets)"
- Ludacris featuring Plies - "Nasty Girl"
- Ludacris featuring T-Pain - "One More Drink"
- Mario - "Thinkin' About You"
- Meeno - "I'm That"
- Mic Geronimo - "Nothin' Move But the Money"
- Monica - "Knock Knock/Get It Off" (2003)
- Monica - "Everything to Me"
- Monica - "Love All Over Me"
- Nas featuring The Game and Chris Brown - "Make the World Go Round"
- Nate Dogg featuring Fabolous, Kurupt and B.R.E.T.T - "I Got Love (Remix)"
- Ras Kass featuring Dr. Dre and Mack 10 - "Ghetto Fabulous"
- Three 6 Mafia - "Hit 'Em"
- The Beatnuts featuring Big Pun and Cuban Link - "Off the Books"
- Wale featuring Gucci Mane - "Pretty Girls"
- Wale - "Nike Boots"
- Young Jeezy featuring Keyshia Cole - "Dreamin"
- T.I. featuring Summer Walker - "And Won't" (2026)

== Filmography ==
=== Film ===
- ATL (2006)
- Beats (2019)
- Shooting Stars (2023)

=== Television ===
- Access Granted (2006)
- BET Honors (2009–16)
- Rip the Runway (2011–12)
- Real Husbands of Hollywood (2013–16)
- BET Presents Love & Happiness: An Obama Celebration (2016)
- Neighborhood Sessions: Usher (2016)
- Fusion's Snoop Dogg Roast Snoop Dogg Smokeout (2016)
- The New Edition Story (2017)
- Tiffany Haddish: She Ready! From The Hood to Hollywood (2017)
- Star (2017–19)
- The Climb (2017)
- BET Hip Hop Awards (2018)
- American Soul (2019)
- Wu-Tang: An American Saga (2019)
- Mixed-ish (2020)
- Grown-ish (2020–21)
- Black-ish (2020–21)
