= ASAP (T.I. song) =

Single by T.I.

from the album Urban Legend
- B-side: "Motivation"
- Released: May 24, 2005 (U.S.)
- Recorded: 2004
- Genre: Southern hip-hop
- Length: 4:44
- Label: Grand Hustle; Atlantic
- Songwriter: C.J. Harris
- Producer: Sanchez Holmes

T.I. singles chronology
"3 Kings" (2005)	"ASAP" (2005)	"Front Back" (2005)

"ASAP" is a song by rapper T.I., released on May 24, 2005, as the third and final single from his third album, Urban Legend (2004). The song was featured on the soundtrack to the 2005 video game, Midnight Club 3: DUB Edition. The song was officially remixed, featuring guest verses from T.I's Pimp Squad Click cohorts, Big Kuntry King and Mac Boney. The song is considered a diss track towards Houston-based rapper, Lil' Flip.

== Chart performance ==
"ASAP" peaked at number 75 on the US Billboard Hot 100 and spent a total of eight weeks on the chart. The song also peaked at number 18 on the US Hot R&B/Hip-Hop Songs charts. Its B-Side song "Motivation" peaked at number 62 on the US Hot R&B/Hip-Hop Songs chart. On June 14, 2006, the song was certified gold by the Recording Industry Association of America (RIAA) for sales of over 500,000 copies in the United States.

== Charts ==
=== ASAP ===
Chart (2005)	Peak position
US Billboard Hot 100	75
US Hot R&B/Hip-Hop Songs (Billboard)	18
US Hot Rap Songs (Billboard)	14

=== Motivation ===
Chart (2005)	Peak position
US Hot R&B/Hip-Hop Songs (Billboard)	62

=== ASAP ===
Chart (2005)	Position
US Hot R&B/Hip-Hop Songs (Billboard)	80

== Certifications ==
Region	Certification	Certified units/sales
United States (RIAA)	Gold	500,000^{‡}
United States (RIAA) Mastertone	Gold	500,000^{*}
^{*} Sales figures based on certification alone.^{‡} Sales+streaming figures based on certification alone.
