= David Blackburn (film editor) =

British film editor

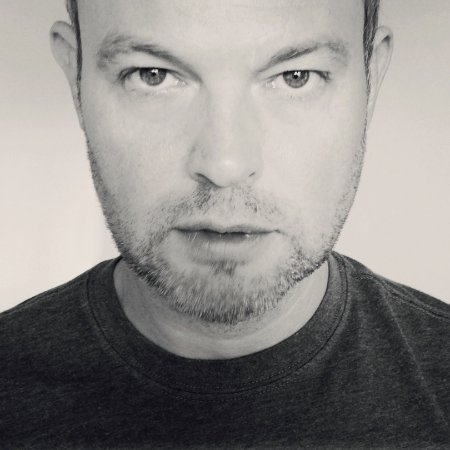
- Born: 1 August 1967 (age 58); London, England
- Occupation: Film editor
- Years active: 1997 – present

David Blackburn is a British film editor. He attended art school in the UK. Blackburn later moved to Los Angeles where he has made music videos. Blackburn won the MVPA's Best Editing Award in 2005 for Blink 182's "Always-" The video for the song was shot in Sydney, Australia with director Joseph Kahn and featured a technique where the screen is split into three equal horizontal strips, but with similar action taking place at different times in different parts of one room staggered to simulate three continuous camera takes which synchronize in a complementary narrative.

Blackburn edited Warners Brothers' action film “Torque” for director Joseph Kahn and the coming of age film "ATL" for director Chris Robinson (director). He has also edited indie features, such as "Adventures Of Power", which debuted at the 2011 Sundance Film Festival and "Detention", which premiered at SXSW 2011 and the documentary feature "Why We Ride."

Blackburn's work includes commercials for Adidas "MiCoach". won the 2011 AICE Award for editing.
