= Bring Em Out (song) =

Single by T.I.

from the album Urban Legend
- B-side: "U Don’t Know Me"
- Released: October 19, 2004
- Recorded: 2004
- Genre: Hip-hop; Southern hip-hop
- Length: 3:36
- Label: Grand Hustle; Atlantic
- Songwriters: Clifford Harris; Kasseem Dean; Shawn Carter; Thomas Bell; Roland Chambers; Kenneth Gamble
- Producer: Swizz Beatz

T.I. singles chronology
| "Let's Get Away" (2004) | "Bring Em Out" (2004) | "Soldier" (2004) |

"Bring Em Out" is a song by American rapper T.I., released as the lead single from his third studio album Urban Legend. The song, produced by Swizz Beatz, contains a vocal sample from Jay-Z's "What More Can I Say". This became T.I.'s first US top-ten single, peaking at number nine on the US Billboard Hot 100 chart.

== Music video ==
The music video for "Bring Em Out" was directed by Fats Cats and was shot in Atlanta. DJ Drama, Jazze Pha and Swizz Beatz made cameo appearances in the video. It features T.I. on a tour bus as well as him performing on a stage for a crowd of fans. At the end of the video, a brief snippet of "U Don't Know Me" plays.

== Usage in media ==
The song was featured extensively during the 2006 NBA Finals as the theme song for the Miami Heat during player introductions. T.I. performed the song on an episode of The O.C., titled "Return of The Nana". The instrumental version of this song appears on promotions for G4's week-long TV special "Top 100 Video Games of All Time" set to premiere on July 11, 2012.

The song was also used as the entrance theme for the Los Angeles Rams in Super Bowl LIII.

The song appears in 2020 video game Fuser.

The song appears in the Marvel Studios film Deadpool & Wolverine; it plays during the scene where the Resistance (Blade, Elektra, X-23, and Gambit) as well as Deadpool and Wolverine arrive at Cassandra Nova's compound.

== Track listing ==
=== A-side ===
1. "Bring 'Em Out [Amended]"
2. "Bring 'Em Out [Explicit]"
3. "Bring 'Em Out [Instrumental]"

=== B-side ===
1. "U Don't Know Me [Amended]"
2. "U Don't Know Me [Explicit]"
3. "U Don't Know Me [Instrumental]"

== Charts ==
| Chart (2004–2005) | Peak position |
|---|---|
| UK Singles (Official Charts) | 59 |
| US Billboard Hot 100 | 9 |
| US Hot R&B/Hip-Hop Songs (Billboard) | 6 |
| US Hot Rap Songs (Billboard) | 4 |
| US Rhythmic Airplay (Billboard) | 9 |

== Certifications ==
| Region | Certification | Certified units/sales |
|---|---|---|
| United States (RIAA) | 2× Platinum | 2,000,000^{‡} |
| United States (RIAA) Mastertone | Gold | 500,000^{*} |
^{*} Sales figures based on certification alone.^{‡} Sales+streaming figures based on certification alone.

== Release history ==
| Region | Date | Format(s) | Label(s) | Ref. |
|---|---|---|---|---|
| United States | November 8, 2004 | Rhythmic contemporary · urban contemporary radio | Grand Hustle, Atlantic | |
| United States | February 7, 2005 | Contemporary hit radio | Grand Hustle, Atlantic | |
