= Keep It Pimp & Gangsta =

Studio album by Dirty
- Released: February 25, 2003
- Recorded: 2001–2002
- Studio: Nfinity Music Studios; Sony Music Studios (New York, NY); Treasure House Studios
- Genre: Southern hip hop
- Length: 1:16:39
- Label: Universal
- Producer: Big Pimp; Cool & Dre; Dr. Fangaz; Kevin "Khao" Cates; Mannie Fresh

Dirty chronology
The Pimp & da Gangsta (2001)	Keep It Pimp & Gangsta (2003)	Love Us or Hate Us (2003)

Singles from Keep It Pimp & Gangsta
- 1. "Lose Control (Candy Man Pt. 2)" Released: 2002; 2. "My Cadillac" Released: June 18, 2002; 3. "That's Dirty" Released: November 12, 2002

Professional ratings
Review scores
Source	Rating
AllMusic	4/5 stars
RapReviews	7.5/10

Keep It Pimp & Gangsta is the third studio album by American hip hop duo Dirty. It was released on February 25, 2003, through Universal Records, marking their second and final studio album distributed by the label, as they would later signed with Rap-A-Lot Records.

Production was handled by Cool & Dre, Dr. Fangaz, Kevin "Khao" Cates, Mannie Fresh and member Big Pimp, with Mike B. Jackson serving as executive producer. It features guest appearances from Lil Burn One, Mr. Blue, DBK, Kevin "Khao" Cates, Mannie Fresh, Ms. Flossy, Pastor Troy and Silk. The album debuted at number 63 on the Billboard 200 and number 13 on the Top R&B/Hip-Hop Albums charts in the US. It was supported with three singles: "Lose Control (Candy Man Pt. 2)", "My Cadillac" and "That's Dirty".

== Track listing ==
No.	Title	Writer(s)	Producer(s)	Length
1.	"Feel Me Ni"	Daniel Patrice Thomas; Tarvares Jevon Webster; Algernon Franklin	Dr. Fangaz	4:39
2.	"C'mon" (featuring Pastor Troy)	D. Thomas; Webster; Micah Troy; Kevin Cates	Khao	4:45
3.	"Keep It" (featuring Khao and DBK)	D. Thomas; Webster; Cates; Darin Bakerking	Khao	4:15
4.	"That's Dirty" (featuring Mannie Fresh, Lil Burn One and Mr. Blue)	D. Thomas; Webster; Byron Thomas; J'Ante' Howard; Timothy Harris	Mannie Fresh	4:13
5.	"Think About U" (featuring Ms. Flossy)	D. Thomas; Webster; Marcello Valenzano; Andre Lyon	Cool & Dre	4:20
6.	"Lose Control (Candy Man, Pt. 2)" (featuring Silk and Mr. Blue)	D. Thomas; Webster; Harris; Cates	Khao	5:10
7.	"Hoochie Mama"	D. Thomas; Webster; Franklin	Dr. Fangaz	4:06
8.	"Sholl Iz"	D. Thomas; Webster; Valenzano; Lyon	Cool & Dre	4:05
9.	"Ackamonkey"	D. Thomas; Webster; Franklin	Dr. Fangaz	4:54
10.	"Woodgrain"	D. Thomas; Webster; Franklin	Dr. Fangaz	5:15
11.	"Fuck Witcha"	D. Thomas; Webster	Big Pimp	4:34
12.	"My Cadillac"	D. Thomas; Webster; Valenzano; Lyon	Cool & Dre	3:31
13.	"Chicken Hustlin'"	D. Thomas; Webster; Cates	Khao	4:46
14.	"Gangsta" (featuring Lil Burn One)	D. Thomas; Webster; Howard	Big Pimp	4:16
15.	"Ghetto Opera"	D. Thomas; Webster	Big Pimp	4:15
16.	"Where da Luv"	D. Thomas; Webster	Big Pimp	4:28
17.	"Ghetto Ride"	D. Thomas; Webster; Valenzano; Lyon	Cool & Dre	5:12
Total length:				1:16:39

== Personnel ==
- Daniel "Big Pimp" Thomas — vocals, producer (tracks: 11, 14–16)
- Tarvares "Mr. G Stacka The Gangsta" Webster — vocals
- Micah "Pastor" Troy — featured artist (track 2)
- Kevin "Khao" Cates — featured artist (track 3), keyboards & programming (tracks: 3, 6, 13), producer (tracks: 2, 3, 6, 13)
- Darin Baker King — backing vocals (track 3)
- Byron "Mannie Fresh" Thomas — featured artist & producer (track 4)
- J'Ante' "Lil' Burn One" Howard — featured artist (tracks: 4, 14)
- Timothy "Mr. Blue" Harris — featured artist (tracks: 4, 6)
- Ms. Flossy — featured artist (track 5)
- Silk — backing vocals (track 6)
- Algernon "Dr. Fangaz" Franklin — keyboards & programming (tracks: 1, 2, 7, 10), producer (tracks: 1, 7, 9, 10)
- Marcello "Cool" Valenzano — keyboards & programming (tracks: 5, 8, 17), producer (tracks: 5, 8, 12, 17)
- Andre "Dre" Lyon — keyboards & programming (tracks: 5, 8, 17), producer (tracks: 5, 8, 12, 17)
- David Karmiol — guitar (track 17)
- Arshieal Johns — recording & mixing (tracks: 1–3, 5–9, 12, 13, 17)
- Mike B. Jackson — recording (tracks: 11, 12, 14–17), mixing (tracks: 10, 11, 14–16), engineering assistant (track 9), executive producer
- Chris Theis — recording (track 4)
- Kurt McKinney — recording & mixing (track 10)
- Leslie Brathwaite — mixing (track 4)
- Steve Fisher — engineering assistant (track 4)

== Charts ==
Chart (2003)	Peak position
US Billboard 200	63
US Top R&B/Hip-Hop Albums (Billboard)	13
