= Dirty (group) =

American hip hop group

Dirty Boyz
- Origin: Montgomery, Alabama
- Genres: Southern hip hop; Gangsta hip hop; Alternative hip hop
- Years active: 1998 - present
- Labels: Nfinity Music, Universal, Rap-A-Lot, Blackklown Records
- Members: Big Pimp; Mr. G Stacka The Gangsta
- Past members: Lil Burn One, Filthy Finks, Slick Pullis, Yodi Da Hustler aka Baby Pacino

Dirty is a hip hop duo from Montgomery, Alabama, composed of cousins Big Pimp (Daniel Thomas, born 1978) and Mr. G Stacka The Gangsta (Tarvares Webster, born 1981). Their most popular album, Keep It Pimp & Gangsta peaked at number thirteen on the Top R&B/Hip-Hop Albums chart and number 63 on the Billboard 200.

== Biography ==
The first major rap artists out of Alabama, they released their debut album, Country Versatile in 1999. After their second album sold well regionally, they signed with Universal Records, who re-released The Pimp & da Gangsta nationally in 2001. Their second album for Universal was 2002s Keep It Pimp & Gangsta. By this time, they signed to James Prince's label Rap-A-Lot Records and started their own label, as well, entitled, Blackklown. In 2003, they released their next album, Love Us or Hate Us, on Rap-A-Lot Records. In 2007, the group decided to leave the label, on good terms.

== Discography ==
Year	Album	Chart position	
Year	Album	US	US Hip-Hop
1999	Country Versatile	-	-
2001	The Pimp & da Gangsta	88	19
2003	Keep It Pimp & Gangsta	63	13
2003	Love Us or Hate Us	160	22
2005	Hood Stories	186	26
2007	The Art of Storytelling	-	40
2009	Married to the Game	82	20
2013	Think Like a Pimp Act Like a Gangsta	-	-
2016	Field N	-	-
2018	The Godfathers	-	-
