= Hood Stories =

Studio album by Dirty
- Released: August 16, 2005
- Studios: Noddfactor Studios (Denton, TX); M.A.D. Studios (Houston, TX)
- Genre: Hip hop
- Length: 1:04:55
- Label: Rap-A-Lot 4 Life
- Producers: Da Club Bangaz; Maximillion; Mike Dean

Dirty chronology
Love Us or Hate Us (2003)	Hood Stories (2005)	The Art of Storytelling (2007)

Professional ratings
Review scores
Source	Rating
AllMusic	3/5 stars
RapReviews	7.5/10

Hood Stories is the fifth studio album by American hip hop duo Dirty. It was released on August 16, 2005 via Rap-A-Lot 4 Life, marking their second album for the label. Recording sessions took place at Noddfactor Studios in Denton and M.A.D. Studios in Houston. Production was handled by Maximillion, Mike Dean and Da Club Bangaz, with J Prince serving as executive producer. It features guest appearances from Bun B, J-Ral, Lil Burn One, Lil Mario and Tanya Herron. The album debuted at number 186 on the Billboard 200 and number 26 on the Top R&B/Hip-Hop Albums charts in the United States.

== Track listing ==
No.	Title	Producer(s)	Length
1.	"Alabama (Stand Up)" (featuring Lil' Burn One)	Maximillion	4:38
2.	"Choppin"	Mike Dean	7:45
3.	"Stop Lyin'" (featuring J-Ral)	Maximillion; Mike Dean	4:24
4.	"Git Cha Handz Off Me"	Maximillion	3:29
5.	"Moma I'ma Soldier"	Maximillion	4:13
6.	"Pray 4 Me"	Maximillion	3:38
7.	"I'ma Gangsta"	Maximillion	3:30
8.	"What It Is?"	Maximillion	3:21
9.	"Let's Ride" (featuring Lil' Mario)	Da Club Bangaz	3:58
10.	"Silky Pimp Cutta"	Maximillion	3:48
11.	"Rolie Polie" (featuring Bun B)	Maximillion	4:16
12.	"Bring da Hood Back"	Maximillion	2:56
13.	"Behind Ya Duke"	Maximillion	2:57
14.	"Sunshine"	Maximillion	3:06
15.	"Sometimes"	Maximillion	4:30
16.	"Just a Little Bit Mo" (featuring Tanya Herron)	Mike Dean	4:26
Total length:			1:04:55

== Charts ==
Chart (2005)	Peak position
US Billboard 200	186
US Top R&B/Hip-Hop Albums (Billboard)	26
