= Love Us or Hate Us =

Studio album by Dirty
- Released: September 30, 2003
- Studio: Nfinity Music Studios
- Genre: Southern hip-hop
- Length: 1:12:38
- Label: Nfinity Music; Rap-A-Lot 4 Life
- Producer: Big Pimp; Maximillion; The Titans

Dirty chronology
Keep It Pimp & Gangsta (2003)	Love Us or Hate Us (2003)	Hood Stories (2005)

Professional ratings
Review scores
Source	Rating
AllMusic	2.5/5 stars
RapReviews	7/10

Love Us or Hate Us is the fourth studio album by American hip-hop duo Dirty. It was released on September 30, 2003, through Nfinity Music and Rap-A-Lot 4 Life. Production was handled by Big Pimp, Maximillion and The Titans, with Mike B. Jackson serving as executive producer. It features guest appearances from Lil Burn One, Maximillion, Mr. Blue, Twist, Wicked and Baby Pacino. The album debuted at number 160 on the Billboard 200 and number 22 on the Top R&B/Hip-Hop Albums charts in the United States. It was supported by two promotional singles "That's Why I" and "I Wish".

== Track listing ==
No.	Title	Producer(s)	Length
1.	"Love Us or Hate Us"	The Titans	5:09
2.	"We Still"	Big Pimp	4:02
3.	"24 Inches Woodgrain Grippin"	Maximillion	4:25
4.	"Pimp Life"	Maximillion	4:10
5.	"Keep My Name Out Your Mouth" (featuring Baby Pacino)	Big Pimp	4:20
6.	"Da Hood"	Maximillion	4:09
7.	"Gangsta Wife" (featuring Maximillion)	Maximillion	5:23
8.	"I Wish" (featuring Mr. Blue, Lil Burn One, Wicked and Twist)	Maximillion	4:56
9.	"2 Deep Creepin"	Maximillion	4:57
10.	"Ain't No Sunshine" (featuring Mr. Blue)	Big Pimp; Maximillion (co.)	4:58
11.	"If I Die Tonight"	Big Pimp	6:06
12.	"That's Why I" (featuring Lil Burn One)	Maximillion	4:10
13.	"No More Tears" (featuring Maximillion)	Maximillion	6:24
14.	"Thou Shall Not Kill" (featuring Twist and Wicked)	Maximillion	4:39
15.	"Paid My Dues"	Big Pimp; Maximillion (co.)	4:50
Total length:			1:12:38

== Personnel ==
- Daniel "Big Pimp" Thomas — vocals, producer (tracks: 2, 5, 10, 11, 15)
- Tarvares "Mr. G Stacka The Gangsta" Webster — vocals
- Baby Pacino — vocals (track 5)
- Maxim "Maxamillion" Coriolan — vocals (tracks: 7, 13), producer (tracks: 3, 4, 6–9, 12–14), co-producer (tracks: 10, 15)
- Timothy "Mr. Blue" Harris — vocals (tracks: 8, 10)
- J'Ante' "Lil' Burn One" Howard — vocals (tracks: 8, 12)
- Wicked — vocals (tracks: 8, 14)
- Twist — vocals (tracks: 8, 14)
- The Titans — producer (track 1)
- Mike Dean — mastering
- Mike B. Jackson — executive producer
- Tim Welch — design
- Asbury Foster — photography
- Anzel Jennings — A&R
- James "J.Prince" Smith — special consultant

== Charts ==
Chart (2003)	Peak position
US Billboard 200	160
US Top R&B/Hip-Hop Albums (Billboard)	22
