= I'm a King =

Single by P$C

from the album Hustle & Flow soundtrack and 25 to Life
- B-side: "Booty Language"
- Released: July 22, 2005
- Studio: P$ West Studios (Atlanta, GA); Stankonia Recording (Atlanta)
- Genre: Hip-hop
- Length: 3:32
- Label: Grand Hustle; Atlantic
- Songwriters: Clifford Harris; Nathaniel Josey; Sean Merrett; Akeem Lawal; Cortez Thomas; Darryl Richardson II; Jonathan Smith; Craig Love; James Phillips
- Producer: Lil' Jon

Music video
- "I'm A King (Remix)" on YouTube

"I'm a King" is a song performed by the American hip-hop group Pimp Squad Click (PSC) featuring Lil' Scrappy. It was released on July 22, 2005, via Grand Hustle/Atlantic Records as a single from the Hustle & Flow soundtrack (b/w UTP's "Booty Language") and the lead single from P$C's debut album 25 to Life. The recording sessions took place at P$ West Studios and Stankonia Recording in Atlanta. Production was handled by Lil' Jon.

The song peaked at number 67 on the Billboard Hot 100, number 54 on Radio Songs, number 16 on both the Hot R&B/Hip-Hop Songs and R&B/Hip-Hop Airplay charts, and number 14 on the Hot Rap Songs chart in the United States. It received a Gold certification by the Recording Industry Association of America on June 14, 2006, for selling 500,000 units in the US. An accompanying music video for "I'm a King (Remix)" features scenes from Craig Brewer's 2005 video game Madden NFL 06.

== Track listing ==
12-inch vinyl
No.	Title	Writer(s)	Producer(s)	Length
1.	"I'm a King" (Radio Version)	Clifford Harris; Nathaniel Josey; Sean Merrett; Akeem Lawal; Cortez Thomas; Darryl Richardson II; Jonathan Smith; Craig Love; James Phillips	Lil' Jon
2.	"I'm a King" (Album Version)		Lil' Jon
3.	"I'm a King" (Instrumental)		Lil' Jon
4.	"Booty Language" (Radio Version)	Terius Gray; Clifford Nicholas; Damon Grison; Terrence Freeman; D. Miller	Sinista
5.	"Booty Language" (Album Version)		Sinista
6.	"Booty Language" (Instrumental)		Sinista

12-inch vinyl promo
No.	Title	Length
1.	"I'm a King" (Radio Version)
2.	"I'm a King" (Instrumental)
3.	"I'm a King" (Album Version)
4.	"I'm a King" (Acapella)

CD single promo
No.	Title	Length
1.	"I'm a King" (Radio Version)
2.	"I'm a King" (Instrumental)
3.	"I'm a King" (Explicit Album Version)

CD-R single promo
No.	Title	Length
1.	"I'm a King" (Radio)
2.	"I'm a King" (Explicit)

== Charts ==
=== Weekly charts ===
Charts (2005)	Peak position
US Billboard Hot 100	67
US Radio Songs (Billboard)	54
US Hot R&B/Hip-Hop Songs (Billboard)	16
US R&B/Hip-Hop Airplay (Billboard)	16
US Hot Rap Songs (Billboard)	14

=== Year-end charts ===
Chart (2005)	Position
US Hot R&B/Hip-Hop Songs (Billboard)	87

== Certifications ==
Certifications for "I'm A King"
Region	Certification	Certified units/sales
United States (RIAA)	Gold	500,000^{^}
^{^} Shipments figures based on certification alone.
