= Al Kapone =

American rapper

- Born: Alphonzo Jerome Bailey; November 5, 1975 (age 50)
- Origin: Memphis, Tennessee, U.S.
- Genre: Hip-hop
- Occupation: Rapper

Alphonzo Jerome Bailey (born November 5, 1975), better known by his stage name Al Kapone, is an American rapper from Memphis, Tennessee. Al Kapone is known principally for his underground success in the Memphis hip-hop scene in the 1990s, and his later role in a number of more contemporary songs.

== Career ==
After a decade of cultivating underground cult status in Memphis, Al Kapone began to achieve some mainstream success starting with his role on the soundtrack to the film, Hustle & Flow. The soundtrack included one solo track, titled "Get Crunk, Get Buck". He also wrote and produced "Whoop That Trick" and wrote "Hustle & Flow (It Ain't Over)", both tracks performed by Djay. His song "The Deepest Hood" featured in the 2007 film, Stomp the Yard.

Al Kapone co-wrote E-40's "U and Dat" and Lil' Jon's "Snap Yo Fingers" and appeared on fellow Memphis rappers Three 6 Mafia's album, Last 2 Walk, and 8Ball & MJG's, Ridin High.

== Discography ==
=== Albums ===
- 1992: Street Knowledge: Chapters 1–12
- 1994: Pure Ghetto Anger
- 1994: Sinista Funk
- 1995: Da Resurrection
- 1997: What Cha Got
- 1998: Memphis to the Bombed out Bay
- 2002: Goin' All Out
- 2008: Poppin' Tags (EP)
- 2008: Al Kapeezy Oh Boy - The Hits!!
- 2008: Showdown: Reloaded (with Mr. Sche)
- 2010: Godfather EP
- 2010: Guitar Bump
- 2010: The Kapeezy Soul Hop Experience

=== Singles ===
- 1992: "Lyrical Drive-By (Indie single)"
- 1997: "What Cha Got Remix"
- 2013: "Memphis Pride"
- 2013: "Twerk Queen"

=== Compilations ===
- 1995: Memphiz Undaground Hustlaz Vol. 1
- 2001: Alakatraz Ridaz: The Present & the Past (with Taylor Boyz & Sir Vince)
- 2001: Alkatraz Ridaz Chapter 2 (with Taylor Boyz)
- 2001: Memphis Drama Vol. 1
- 2002: Memphis Drama Vol. 2
- 2002: The Best of Memphis Drama Vol. 1 & 2 Chopped & Screwed
- 2003: Memphis Drama Vol. 3: Outta Town Luv
- 2005: Memphis Drama Vol. 4: Crunk Roots
- 2003: Memphis Untouchables (with The Jerk & Kingpin Skinny Pimp)
- 2005: Showdown (with Mr. Sche)
- 2005: Whoop That Trick
