= Kevin "Khao" Cates =

American record producer

Kevin "Khao" Cates is an American record producer and entrepreneur from Montgomery, Alabama, United States. Cates rose to prominence for his early involvement with American hip-hop recording artist T.I.’s record label Grand Hustle Records. Cates has produced for notable artists such as Jay-Z, R. Kelly, Snoop Dogg, Ludacris and Young Jeezy.

== Music career ==
Cates began his music career in his native city of Montgomery, Alabama, as a member of the group Crumbsnatchaz in the early 2000s. After gaining a small fanbase, Cates leveraged his local celebrity fame into a DJ position on Montgomery's Hot 105 radio station as the voice behind the Friday Night Street Jam. During that time, Cates developed strong listening base by incorporating independently signed artist into his set. This led to Cates meeting Jason Geter, CEO of Grand Hustle Records and their flagship artist, T.I. This relationship led to Cates landing production placements on T.I.’s platinum selling albums, Urban Legend and King. On the latter, Cates produced "Why You Wanna" which peaked at No. 29 on the Billboard Hot 100 and is certified Gold. For his work on King, Cates was nominated for a Grammy. In 2005, Cates landed production placements on the platinum-selling albums Young Jeezy's Let's Get It: Thug Motivation 101, Paul Wall’s The Peoples Champ and Lil Kim’s The Naked Truth. In 2015, Cates was selected by Republican Presidential Nominee Ben Carson to write a song for his campaign. In 2019, Cates branched out as a solo artist and released the single "Done With Her" featuring Gucci Mane, YBN Nahmir and Lil Baby.

== Business career ==
In 2017, Cates introduced the Khao Music Vault where artists would have access to Cates private beats.

== Personal life ==
=== Philanthropy ===
In 2008, Cates founded the nonprofit Bridge Da Gap, which focuses on music, technology, education for kids grade 6 to 12. Cates personally produced over 600 songs for the Bridge Da Gap program that taught math, science and helped improved standardized test scores for students across the United States and the Bahamas. Actress Meagan Good is a spokesperson and teacher for the Bridge Da Gap program. Using the success of Bridge Da Gap as the foundation, Cates would develop his own education curriculum entitled KOOLriculum.

In 2012, Cates partnered with Charles R. Schwab and the Boys and Girls Club for the "Money Matters Music Mogul" contest where teenagers wrote songs about financial literacy over Cates’ production.

In 2018, Cates developed KoolAR, the augmented reality arm of KOOLriculum merging hip-hop music with animated characters.
