= Live in the Sky =

Single by T.I. featuring Jamie Foxx

from the album King
- Released: September 5, 2006 (U.S.)
- Genre: Hip hop; R&B
- Length: 5:54
- Label: Grand Hustle; Atlantic
- Songwriters: C. Harris; K. McMasters
- Producer: Keith Mack

T.I. singles chronology
"My Love" (2006)	"Live in the Sky" (2006)	"Pac's Life" (2006)

Jamie Foxx singles chronology
"DJ Play a Love Song" (2006)	"Live in the Sky" (2006)	"Can I Take U Home" (2006)

"Live in the Sky" is a song by American rapper T.I., released on September 5, 2006, as the third and final single from his fourth album King. The song features vocals from American actor and singer Jamie Foxx. The hip hop and R&B song is a tribute and dedicated to T.I.’s deceased friend Big Phil.

== Music video ==
The music video for the song was directed by Chris Robinson.

== Charts ==
Chart (2006)	Peak position
UK Singles (Official Charts)	83
US Hot R&B/Hip-Hop Songs (Billboard)	57

== Other versions ==
- "Live in the Sky" [explicit version]
- "Drug Related" (non-album track) [explicit version]
