= U Don't Know Me (T.I. song) =

Single by T.I.

from the album Urban Legend
- Released: January 11, 2005
- Recorded: 2004
- Genre: Southern hip hop; gangsta rap
- Length: 4:03
- Label: Grand Hustle; Atlantic
- Songwriters: Clifford Harris; Aldrin Davis
- Producer: DJ Toomp

T.I. singles chronology
"Soldier" (2004)	"U Don't Know Me" (2005)	"3 Kings" (2005)

"U Don't Know Me" is a song by American rapper T.I., released on January 11, 2005, as the second single from his third studio album, Urban Legend (2004). The single peaked at number 23 on the US Billboard Hot 100 chart. The song appears in the video game Midnight Club 3: DUB Edition.

== Accolades ==
This song was nominated for several awards including the Grammy Award for Best Rap Solo Performance, the MTV Video Music Award for "Best Rap Video", and the VIBE award for "Street Anthem of the Year". It was also ranked 61 on Complex's "Best Songs of the Complex Decade".

== Music video ==
The music video was filmed on various locations in Atlanta, Georgia, and includes cameos by Lil 3rd, P$C, DJ Toomp, Alfamega, Jason Geter, Dolla D.P., the late Philant Johnson, BlackOwned C-Bone, Big Kuntry King, Young Dro, Jazze Pha and Daz Dillinger.

== Chart performance ==
"U Don't Know Me" peaked at number 23 on the US Billboard Hot 100 and number six on the Hot R&B/Hip-Hop Songs charts. The song spent a total of 20 weeks on the chart. I"n 2024 it was certified gold by the RIAA for sales of over 500,000 equivalent units in the United States.

== Charts ==
=== Weekly charts ===
Chart (2005)	Peak position
US Billboard Hot 100	23
US Hot R&B/Hip-Hop Songs (Billboard)	6
US Hot Rap Songs (Billboard)	4
US Pop Airplay (Billboard)	65
US Rhythmic Airplay (Billboard)	14

=== Year-end charts ===
Chart (2005)	Position
US Billboard Hot 100	79
US Hot R&B/Hip-Hop Songs (Billboard)	23

== Certifications ==
Region	Certification	Certified units/sales
United States (RIAA)	Gold	500,000^{‡}
United States (RIAA) Mastertone	Platinum	1,000,000^{*}
^{*} Sales figures based on certification alone.^{‡} Sales+streaming figures based on certification alone.

== Release history ==
Region	Date	Format(s)	Label	Ref.
United States	February 7, 2005	Rhythmic contemporary radio	Atlantic	
United States	February 7, 2005	Urban contemporary radio	Atlantic	
