= Country Versatile =

Studio album by Dirty
- Released: July 13, 1999
- Recorded: 1999
- Genre: Hip hop
- Label: Nfinity Music
- Producer: Dirty

Dirty chronology
Country Versatile (1999)	The Pimp & da Gangsta (2001)

Country Versatile is the debut album released by rap group, Dirty. It was independently released on July 13, 1999 through Nfinity Music.

== Track listing ==
1. "Dirty Niggaz"- 3:51
2. "Vogues/Cadillac Anthem"- 3:50
3. "Young Niggaz"- 4:20
4. "All I Do"- 5:23
5. "Dirt I Bleed"- 5:09
6. "Ride"- 6:09
7. "What They Really Want"- 4:36
8. "Pimp and Gangsta"- 6:33
9. "Dirty Gul"- 5:09
10. "Deep"- 4:52
11. "South West"- 5:37
12. "Twerk Sum"- :49
13. "Really, Real"- 4:01
14. "Dirty Luv"- 4:58
