= What You Know (T.I. song) =

Single by T.I.

from the album King
- Released: January 28, 2006
- Recorded: 2005
- Genre: Southern hip hop; trap
- Length: 4:34 (album version); 4:08 (radio version)
- Label: Grand Hustle; Atlantic
- Songwriters: Clifford Harris; Aldrin Davis; Curtis Mayfield; Donny Hathaway; Leroy Hutson
- Producer: DJ Toomp

T.I. singles chronology
"Front Back" (2005)	"What You Know" (2006)	"Why You Wanna" (2006)

"What You Know" is a song by American rapper T.I., released as the lead single from his fourth studio album King (2006). The song peaked at number three on the Billboard Hot 100 and was certified double platinum by the RIAA following shipment in excess of two million copies.

== Background ==
The song is produced by T.I.'s frequent collaborator DJ Toomp, from Zone Boy Productions, with additional keys by Wonder Arillo. It utilizes an interpolation of Roberta Flack's version of The Impressions's "Gone Away" and of the song "Hey Joe", written by Billy Roberts but popularized by Jimi Hendrix.

== Composition ==
The song is in E♭ minor.

== Chart performance ==
"What You Know" peaked at number three on the US Billboard Hot 100 chart. It also peaked at number one on the Hot R&B/Hip-Hop Songs and Hot Rap Songs charts. It spent a total of 20 weeks on the Hot 100 chart. On December 14, 2006, the song was certified double platinum by the Recording Industry Association of America (RIAA) for sales of over two million copies in the United States.

== Remixes ==
American rappers Juelz Santana and J.R Writer, of Dipset, recorded a remix of this song entitled "What You Know (About That Crack)". American rapper Papoose recorded a freestyle over the song entitled "What You Know (About Pap)". American rapper Lil Wayne also recorded a remix of "What You Know", which can be found on his mixtape Dedication 2.

== Accolades ==
- "What You Know" won for "Best Rap Solo Performance" and was nominated for "Best Rap Song" at the 49th Annual Grammy Awards.
- "What You Know" was performed at the 2006 MTV Video Music Awards, where its music video was nominated for two awards.
- VIBE named T.I.'s "What You Know" as the Top Song of 2006. It was also ranked fourth on a similar list by Rolling Stone , and was number 1 in Muchmusic's Top HipHop 2006 List.
- Pitchfork Media ranked "What You Know" number 3 on their "Top Tracks of 2006" list, while T.I.'s collaboration on Justin Timberlake's song "My Love" was ranked number 1.
- The song is one of the most critically acclaimed of 2006, and is one of T.I.'s most successful. It has garnered a 5-star rating from Pitchfork Media. The song peaked at number three on the Billboard Hot 100, and it also topped the Hot R&B/Hip-Hop Songs chart.
- In 2008, it was ranked number 68 on VH1's 100 Greatest Songs of Hip Hop.
- In 2007, "What You Know" was named the second-best single of 2006 on The Village Voice's Pazz & Jop annual critics' poll, after Gnarls Barkley's "Crazy".

== In popular culture ==
- The song was used in promotion of the film ATL, in which T.I. stars.
- Japanese professional wrestler KENTA used an instrumental of the song as his entrance theme.
- The song was the at-bat music for MLB player Joe Mauer.
- The song was used as the entrance song for Kendall Grove at UFC 101.
- The song was used at Turner Field whenever Édgar Rentería came up to bat during the 2006 season.
- The song was sampled in Pitbull's song "Que Tu Sabes D'eso" featuring Fat Joe and Sinful from the album El Mariel.
- The song is used at the beginning of Rich Turpin's "Whatcha Know?" segment on BT Sports Radio.
- The song is often used by members of the Theta Phi chapter of Kappa Alpha Psi fraternity at Troy University during parties and events.

== Charts ==
=== Weekly charts ===
Chart (2006)	Peak position
US Billboard Hot 100	3
US Hot R&B/Hip-Hop Songs (Billboard)	1
US Hot Rap Songs (Billboard)	1
US Pop Airplay (Billboard)	39
US Rhythmic Airplay (Billboard)	2

=== Year-end charts ===
Chart (2006)	Position
US Billboard Hot 100	47
US Hot R&B/Hip-Hop Songs (Billboard)	7
US Rhythmic (Billboard)	25

== Certifications ==
Region	Certification	Certified units/sales
Canada (Music Canada) Ringtone	Platinum	40,000^{*}
United States (RIAA)	Gold	500,000^{*}
United States (RIAA) Mastertone	2× Platinum	2,000,000^{*}
^{*} Sales figures based on certification alone.

== Release history ==
Region	Date	Format(s)	Label(s)	Ref.
United States	February 14, 2006	Rhythmic contemporary radio	Atlantic	
