= The Art of Storytelling (Dirty album) =

Studio album by Dirty
- Released: June 12, 2007
- Recorded: 2007
- Genre: Hip hop
- Label: Rap-a-Lot; Asylum; Atlantic
- Producer: Terrence Cash, James Prince

Dirty chronology
Hood Stories (2005)	The Art of Storytelling (2007)

The Art of Storytelling is the sixth album released by rap group, Dirty. It was released on June 12, 2007 through Rap-a-Lot Records, Asylum Records, Atlantic Records and was produced by Terrence Cash and James Prince. The Art of Storytelling only made it to #40 on the Top R&B/Hip-Hop Albums, becoming their only major studio album to not make it to the Billboard 200. This would mark Dirty's final album with Rap-a-Lot Records as the duo chose to leave label after this album's release.

== Track listing ==
1. "Set Up"- 4:39
2. "Stop Playin'"- 3:30
3. "Makin Money"- 4:42
4. "Same Old Hood"- 3:52
5. "Shut Em Down"- 4:35
6. "Chevy Rock"- 4:16
7. "Slob on My Nobb"- 1:41
8. "I Got 50" (Skit)- 0:37
9. "I Got 50"- 4:13 (Featuring Paris)
10. "Couple Hundred"- 4:41
11. "Just Look at Her"- 3:49
12. "Makin Money"- 2:34
13. "Ride 4 Me"- 4:56
14. "I'm Hood"- 4:33
15. "Black Flagg"- 2:22
16. "Everybody Shoot"- 3:04
17. "Snitcher"- 0:54
18. "Rearview Mirror"- 4:05
19. "Whoop Em"- 4:45
20. "Check Myself"- 5:02
21. "Comin Home (Troop Song)"- 4:17
