= The Pimp & da Gangsta =

Studio album by Dirty
- Released: February 27, 2001
- Recorded: 2000
- Genre: Southern hip hop, Gangsta rap, Alternative hip hop
- Label: Universal Records
- Producer: Dr. Fangaz

Dirty chronology
Country Versatile (1999)	The Pimp & da Gangsta (2001)	Keep It Pimp & Gangsta (2003)

Professional ratings
Review scores
Source	Rating
Allmusic	4/5 stars

The Pimp & da Gangsta is the second studio album by rap group Dirty, and their first released through a major label. It was released on February 27, 2001 through Universal Records and was produced by the members of group. The album peaked at #88 on the Billboard 200 and #19 on the Top R&B/Hip-Hop Albums.

== Track listing ==
No.	Title	Length
1.	"Intro"	2:16
2.	"Rollin Vogues"	3:51
3.	"Gimme Sum Mo"	3:31
4.	"6 Deep Creepin"	4:28
5.	"Bendin' Corners"	4:34
6.	"Candyman"	4:55
7.	"Yean Heard (Skit)"	1:03
8.	"Yean Heard"	4:52
9.	"The Pimp & da Gangsta"	6:34
10.	"Ride"	6:05
11.	"Dipped in Blak"	3:14
12.	"Hit da Floe"	5:20
13.	"Twinkys"	4:49
14.	"Da Land"	5:23
15.	"R.I.P."	6:21

== Charts ==
=== Weekly charts ===
Chart (2001)	Peak position
US Billboard 200	88
US Top R&B/Hip-Hop Albums (Billboard)	19

=== Year-end charts ===
Chart (2001)	Position
US Top R&B/Hip-Hop Albums (Billboard)	91
