= Front Back =

2005 single by T.I. featuring UGK

Promotional single by T.I. featuring UGK

from the album King
- Released: November 4, 2005 (U.S.)
- Recorded: 2005
- Genre: Hip hop
- Length: 3:42
- Label: Grand Hustle; Atlantic
- Songwriters: Chad Butler; Bernard Freeman; Clifford Harris; Byron Thomas; O'Shea Jackson; The Meters; Freddie Southwell; Eric Wright; Andre Young
- Producer: Mannie Fresh

Music video
- "Front Back" on YouTube

"Front Back" is a song by American rapper T.I., taken from his fourth studio album King (2006). The song was produced by Mannie Fresh, who also shares co-writing credits alongside Pimp C, Bun B, T.I., Ice Cube, The Meters, Freddie Southwell, Eazy-E and Dr. Dre. The song, which features Southern hip hop duo UGK, samples and embodies portions of the duo's 1994 single "Front, Back, Side to Side", from their second album Super Tight. The song was featured in the trailer for the 2006 film ATL, starring T.I.

== Music video ==
The music video, directed by Dr. Teeth, was filmed in Houston, Texas on January 29, 2006.

The video contains cameo appearances by Big Kuntry King, Slim Thug, Lil 3rd, Grand Hustle act Xtaci, DJ Drama, Young Dro, Lil Keke, Johnny Dang and P$C. DJ Drama can be heard throughout the whole video, while not on the audio version.

== Charts ==
Chart (2005)	Peak position
US Bubbling Under R&B/Hip-Hop Singles (Billboard)	11
