= Neighborhood Sessions =

- Genre: Concert
- Created by: State Farm
- Presented by: TNT
- Country of origin: United States
- Original language: English

Original release
- Network: TNT
- Release: February 15, 2015 – 2016

Neighborhood Sessions is an American television concert series which celebrates the communities and people that inspired artists like Usher, Dave Matthews Band, Toby Keith, and Jennifer Lopez. It is broadcast on TNT and sponsored by StateFarm.
