= Hustle & Flow (soundtrack) =

Hustle & Flow: Music from and Inspired by the Motion Picture

Soundtrack album to Hustle & Flow by various artists
- Released: July 12, 2005
- Studio: P$ West Studios (Atlanta, GA); Stankonia Recording (Atlanta, GA); Hypnotize Studios (Memphis, TN); Chase Studios (Atlanta, GA); LongBoy Entertainment Studio; Cotton Row Recordings (Memphis, TN); Sho'Nuff Studios (Atlanta, GA); Daddy's House Recording Studio (New York, NY); UTP Studios (New Orleans, LA); Trill Studios (Baton Rouge, LA); Studio Center (Miami, FL)
- Genre: Southern hip hop
- Length: 1:13:22
- Label: Grand Hustle; Atlantic
- Producer: Al Kapone; Anthony Dent; Benny "Dada" Tillman; Carlos Thornton; DJ Paul; Doc Jam; Jay-Pee; Juicy J; Kadis; Keith Mack; Lil' Jay; Lil' Jon; Mouse; Niko Lyras; Ryan Leslie; Salih Williams; Sean Marshall; Sinista

Singles from Hustle & Flow: Music from and Inspired by the Motion Picture
- 1. "I'm a King" Released: July 22, 2005; 2. "Bad Bitch (Remix)" Released: 2005

Professional ratings
Review scores
Source	Rating
AllMusic	3/5 stars
HipHopDX	3/5
RapReviews	7.5/10

Hustle & Flow: Music from and Inspired by the Motion Picture is the compilation soundtrack album to Craig Brewer's 2005 film Hustle & Flow. It was released on July 12, 2005, via Grand Hustle/Atlantic Records.

The compilation is composed of 20 tracks, including four excerpts from the film. It features contributions from the film stars Terrence Howard and Taraji P. Henson in their respective movie characters Djay and Shug, as well as Lil' Scrappy, P$C, Webbie, 8Ball & MJG, Al Kapone, Bohagon, Boyz n da Hood, E-40, Lil' Boosie, Mike Jones, Nasty Nardo, Nicole Wray, Trillville, Trina, U.T.P. and Young City a.k.a. Chopper.

Audio production was handled by Lil' Jon, Al Kapone, Mouse, Anthony Dent, Benny "Dada" Tillman, Carlos Thornton, DJ Paul, Doc Jam, Jay-Pee, Juicy J, Kadis, Keith Mack, Lil' Jay, Niko Lyras, Ryan Leslie, Salih Williams, Sean Marshall and Sinista, with Jason Geter, John Singleton, Kevin Liles and T.I. serving as executive producers.

The album peaked at number 30 on the Billboard 200, number 10 on the Top R&B/Hip-Hop Albums and topped the Soundtrack Albums charts in the United States.

Its lead single, "I'm a King (Remix)", reached at number 67 on the Billboard Hot 100 and later certified Gold by the Recording Industry Association of America for selling 500,000 units in the US alone. An accompanying music video was released for the song which featured P$C, Lil' Scrappy and Lil' Jon in the city of Atlanta and clips from Hustle & Flow. The second single off of the soundtrack, the remix of Webbie's "Bad Bitch" with Trina, made it to number 48 on the Hot R&B/Hip-Hop Songs. The song "It's Hard out Here for a Pimp" won the Academy Award for Best Original Song at the 78th Academy Awards ceremony and was performed on stage by the members of Three 6 Mafia.

== Track listing ==
No.	Title	Writer(s)	Producer(s)	Length
1.	"I'm a King (Remix)" (performed by P$C & Lil' Scrappy)	Clifford Harris; Nathaniel Josey; Sean Merrett; Akeem Lawal; Cortez Thomas; Darryl Richardson II; Jonathan Smith; Craig Love; James Phillips	Lil' Jon	3:32
2.	"Swerve" (performed by Lil' Boosie & Webbie)	Torence Hatch; Webster Gradney	Mouse	4:09
3.	"Microphone (Skit)" (performed by Terrence Howard & Mark Goodfellow)			1:02
4.	"It's Hard out Here for a Pimp" (performed by Terrence Howard & Taraji P. Henson)	Jordan Houston; Paul Beauregard; Cedric Coleman	DJ Paul; Juicy J	3:00
5.	"Tell Me Why" (performed by 8Ball & MJG)	Premro Smith; Marlon Goodwin; James Boyd; Anthony Dent	Anthony Dent	4:04
6.	"Pussy Niggaz" (performed by E-40, Bohagon & Lil' Scrappy)	Earl Stevens; Cederic Leonard; Richardson II; J. Smith; Love; LaMarquis Jefferson	Lil' Jon	4:48
7.	"Whoop That Trick" (performed by Terrence Howard)	Alphonzo Bailey	Al Kapone; Lil' Jon	4:26
8.	"Bum Guy (Skit)" (performed by Terrence Howard & T.C. Sharpe)			1:55
9.	"Man Up" (performed by Trillville)	Donnell Prince; Lawrence Edwards; Jamal Glaze; Jonathan Lewis; D. Treadwell	Lil Jay; Doc Jam; Lil' Jon (co.)	4:43
10.	"Carbon 15's, A.K.'s & Mac 11's" (performed by Boyz n da Hood)	Lee Dixon; Jay Jenkins; Miguel Scott; Jacoby White; Benny Tillman; Carlos Thornton	Carlos Thornton; Benny "Dada" Tillman	3:50
11.	"Lil' Daddy" (performed by Young City a.k.a. Chopper)	Kevin Barnes; C. Williams; Ryan Leslie; Gary Spriggs; Sean Marshall	Ryan Leslie; Kadis; Sean Marshall	4:25
12.	"Let's Get a Room" (performed by Nasty Nardo)	William Ivory; Jonathan Powell	Jay-Pee	4:14
13.	"Booty Language" (performed by UTP)	Terius Gray; Clifford Nicholas; Damon Grison; Terrence Freeman; D. Miller	Sinista	4:05
14.	"Bad Bitch (Remix)" (performed by Webbie & Trina)	Gradney; R. Jones	Mouse	3:59
15.	"We in Charge (Skit)" (performed by Terrence Howard & Taryn Manning)			1:01
16.	"Hustle and Flow (It Ain't Over)" (performed by Terrence Howard & Taraji P. Henson)	Bailey	Al Kapone; Niko Lyras	3:30
17.	"Still Tippin' (It's a Man's World Remix)" (performed by Mike Jones & Nicole Wray)		Salih Williams	4:42
18.	"Murder Game" (performed by P$C)	Harris; Josey; Merrett; Lawal; Thomas; Keith McMasters	Keith Mack	5:24
19.	"Get Crunk, Get Buck" (performed by Al Kapone)	Bailey	Al Kapone	3:55
20.	"Man Ain't Like a Dog (Skit)" (performed by Terrence Howard)			2:38
Total length:				1:13:22

== Charts ==
=== Weekly charts ===
Chart (2005)	Peak position
US Billboard 200	30
US Top R&B/Hip-Hop Albums (Billboard)	10
US Top Soundtracks (Billboard)	1

=== Year-end charts ===
Chart (2005)	Position
US Top R&B/Hip-Hop Albums (Billboard)	75
