= ATL (film) =

2006 American comedy-drama film by Chris Robinson

- Theatrical release poster
- Directed by: Chris Robinson
- Screenplay by: Tina Gordon Chism
- Story by: Antwone Fisher
- Produced by: Dallas Austin; Tionne Watkins; James Lassiter; Jody Gerson; Will Smith
- Starring: Tip Harris; Lauren London; Antwan Andre Patton; Mykelti Williamson; Keith David
- Cinematography: Crash
- Edited by: David Blackburn
- Music by: Aaron Zigman
- Production company: Overbrook Entertainment
- Distributed by: Warner Bros. Pictures
- Release date: March 31, 2006
- Running time: 105 minutes
- Country: United States
- Language: English
- Budget: $7 million
- Box office: $21 million

ATL is a 2006 American coming-of-age comedy-drama film, and the feature film directorial debut of music video director Chris Robinson. The screenplay was written by Tina Gordon Chism from an original story by Antwone Fisher, and is loosely based on the experiences of the film's producers Dallas Austin and Tionne "T-Boz" Watkins growing up in Atlanta, Georgia (ATL). The film is a coming-of-age tale concerning Rashad, played by Atlanta native and hip hop artist T.I. (credited as Tip Harris) in his film debut, and his friends in their final year in high school and on the verge of adulthood. The film also stars Antwan Andre Patton, more commonly known as Big Boi of the hip hop group OutKast; Evan Ross; Jackie Long; Jason Weaver; Lauren London; and Mykelti Williamson.

ATL was the first feature film for its director and the majority of its cast. Filmed in Atlanta, Georgia in summer 2005, many celebrities from the city make cameo appearances, including Bone Crusher, Jazze Pha, Killer Mike, and Monica. ATL received generally positive reviews from critics, who praised the performances and soundtrack, but criticized the direction and formulaic script. The film grossed $21 million worldwide against a production budget of $7 million and has since become a cult film among the rap community.

== Plot ==
Rashad is a teen living in Atlanta, Georgia, with his Uncle George, and his little brother Anton. He and his brother were raised by George since their parents died in a car accident, and they work with him as part of his custodial company. When not working or finishing his last semester of high school, Rashad spends most of his time with his friends. Rashad is a talented artist but does not see much of a future in that field as he has become accustomed to working the family business. Esquire, Rashad's best friend, goes to a prep school on the opposite side of town from where they live, and is trying to attend an Ivy League college after senior year. However, he finds out that he will need a letter of recommendation from someone of high stature to better his chances of acceptance at the school he wants to attend.

Rashad and his friends are also a skate crew at a skating rink where local teens hang out. While there, Rashad catches the eye of Erin, a girl with a mysterious background, since he only sees her around when she is hanging out with her friends. The two become attracted to one another and they later kiss when he gives her a ride home in his Chevrolet El Camino. Esquire instantly develops a disliking for Rashad's new love interest, considering her bad company. No longer under Rashad's watchful eyes, Anton becomes involved with a Marcus, a drug dealer, and begins to sell for him.

At work one day, Esquire meets John Garnett, a millionaire. The two become friends and Esquire sees an opportunity to obtain the letter of recommendation. When Esquire goes to John's house to pick up the letter, he meets his daughter Erin. Erin says that she will reveal where Esquire is really from (something he lied to her father about) if he tells Rashad about her.

Eventually Rashad finds out the truth about Erin. He no longer speaks to his friends, realizing that Esquire knew about Erin the whole time. Esquire, feeling guilty about the way he obtained the letter, decides to return it to John, and reveals the truth about himself. He also attempts to make peace with Rashad and ask him to attend Skate Wars, the annual skate competition. Rashad initially refuses the offer, but changes his mind after speaking to George. Before he can attend he finds out that Marcus is looking for Anton and the money he owes him. Rashad tracks the two down and after a confrontation Anton is shot in the neck. At the hospital, Rashad and Anton reconnect. Rashad and his friends make peace as well, he makes up with Erin, and each go on onto succeed in their endeavours.

== Cast ==
- T.I. as Rashad Swann, the narrator of the story. Like Rashad, Harris is born and raised in the city of Atlanta. Chris Robinson had directed Harris' first music video four years prior to the creation of ATL, and was very impressed by his charisma and presence. "But on this film he came to the table, worked so hard and never tried to be T.I.—he became Rashad." On being a part of the film's production, Harris said he felt "it was the most honest representation of my culture and my city ever to be put on screen and the largest production to be ever filmed in Atlanta, so I [feel] somewhat obligated."
- Evan Ross as Anton "Ant" Swann, Rashad's younger brother. ATL marks Ross' film debut, which he says actually made his first foray easier, since it was also co-star T.I.'s debut. "It's his first movie too, and that has been good because we’ve been able to find ways of doing it together that has made it a lot easier for each of us."
- Lauren London as Erin “New New” Garnett, Rashad's love interest and John Garnett's daughter. The character of New-New was loosely based on R&B group TLC's "T-Boz as a kid," said London. "I talked to her about my character... she explained to me how it was when she was young—the attitude and the flavor. And it's funny, a lot of people say that I act like she used to act at the skating rink.” Director Robinson was impressed by London and "everything from her look, to the fact that she's new. And there's just so much truth in her, and she doesn't know how to lie yet as an actress. It was perfect."
- Jackie Long as Benjamin "Esquire" Gordon, Rashad's childhood best friend. The character of Esquire was inspired by a friend of producer Austin's, who worked at a country club but would tell his friends he worked at a hot dog joint. "And you'd think his family had money, but he lived in the projects." Long auditioned a year prior to shooting the film at the director's home in California. "And he was a long shot but he came in and he became that character," said Robinson.
- Jason Weaver as Teddy, a close friend of Rashad's. Weaver impressed producer Austin in his previous film Drumline enough to get a role in ATL. The director felt that Weaver, the veteran of the young cast, and his experience would be helpful to the other cast members.
- Albert Daniels as Brooklyn Bridges, a New York transplant and another one of Rashad's friends. Robinson had known Daniels since he was a fifteen-year-old production assistant on his music video shoots in New York. "He was an annoying little kid who got fired every time he was a P.A. because he was so inquisitive. But every time they fired him I'd bring him back because I felt like he always had something." Eight years later, Robinson ran into Daniels at a poetry reading in New York City, and told him to audition for the film. Daniels didn't have any money to get to Atlanta where he had to audition, so he hustled money doing poetry in subways, and bought a bus ticket to get there.
- Big Boi as Marcus, the drug dealer Ant begins to work for. He serves as the antagonist of the film, as he plans to lure Ant from Rashad for his own profit. The film also marked Big Boi's film debut. As said by director Robinson in reference to Big Boi's performance, "he wasn't the normal kind of a bad guy. He put so much charisma and flavor behind it. We loved it."
- Keith David as John Garnett, Erin's father and Esquire's acquaintance. He is unaware of the fact that Esquire is lying about who he really is.
- Mykelti Williamson as “Uncle” George Swann, Rashad and Ant's uncle and guardian. George means well but he is very stingy with his snacks so he keeps them locked up in his room or labels them "Property of George". When Rashad and Ant fall out about Ant's drug dealing, George says things to Rashad he doesn't mean but they later make up.
- April Clark as Tondie, Ant's girlfriend. At first, she was rude to Ant when he would try to talk to her. After he begins to become more popular, she begins to develop a crush on him and asks him to be her boyfriend.
- Khadijah Haqq as Veda, New New's friend and Star's twin sister.
- Malika Haqq as Star, New New's friend and Veda's twin sister.
- Lonette McKee as Priscilla Garnett, Erin's mother and John Garnett's wife.
- Markice Moore as Austin, Ant's friend and Marcus' cousin.
- Tae Heckerd as Tonya, Rashad's ex-girlfriend.
- Tasha Smith as Gayle, Veda and Star's mother.
- Monique "Whyte Chocolate" Harris-Ford as Sexy Pizza Customer.
- Buffie Carruth as Big Booty Judy.
- Monica as Monica The Waitress
- Big Gipp as himself. (Cameo)
- Bone Crusher as himself
- Killer Mike as himself
- Jazze Pha as himself

== Soundtrack ==
The music for ATL was to be released in the form of a soundtrack album, however during the recording process of the soundtrack, the focus shifted towards T.I.'s fourth studio album King; The only songs from the album that appeared in the movie were “What You Know” and “Ride Wit Me”.

Among other songs featured during the film include:

- ”Git Up, Git Out” by Big Boi and André 3000 (Outkast) along with Goodie Mob's CeeLo Green and Big Gipp, from Outkast's 1994 debut album, Southernplayalisticadillacmuzik.
- Slim Thug’s “I Ain’t Heard Of That” featuring Pharrell & Bun B from his debut album, “Already Platinum”
- Lyfe Jennings's “Must Be Nice”.
- Aaliyah's “At Your Best (You Are Love)”.
- ”Georgia” by Ludacris and Field Mob featuring Jamie Foxx, sampling Ray Charles' “Georgia on My Mind”. Foxx was chosen to feature on the song after playing Charles in the 2004 biopic Ray.

== Production ==
What I really love about this script is that it's a character piece. It's a story about five real kids who each have a different dream. I wanted to make a film where you really care about the characters and the story.
— Chris Robinson

ATL's story is loosely based on material by producers Dallas Austin and Tionne Watkins, who set out to describe their experiences growing up on the south side of Atlanta in the early '90s. Watkins and producer Jody Gerson approached James Lassiter with the idea of a story about a skating rink that many involved in the Atlanta music scene had started at, and how all of these people would attend the rink every Sunday night in their teen years.

Chris Robinson, a renowned music video director, was contacted with an offer to direct Austin and Watkins' visualization, and took on his first feature with ATL. The film's producers decided Robinson would be well-suited for the project because of his ability to capture the music-driven aspects of the film, as provided by his experience in the field. They also cited his talent in storytelling. According to producer Austin, "a lot of music video directors can't capture the story, so what we'd do was turn on the directors' tapes, turn down the music and just watch to see if we could find the story. Chris was far and away the best." About making ATL his first feature, Robinson stated that "as a music video director, I'd get a lot of scripts that had to do with really big visual pictures. But I wanted to start off doing something that had heart." After being hired, Robinson traveled to Atlanta and spent time with Austin to try to soak up the vibe and energy of the unique city.

Open auditions were held in Atlanta, Chicago, Los Angeles, and New York to comb the crowd for candidates who could compose the film's ensemble cast. Robinson had already decided he wanted relatively unknown actors to perform in the film. Once the cast was assembled, Robinson had his actors converge in Atlanta for six weeks to rehearse the script and familiarize themselves with each other. "All this young black talent out there, all these young black actors who don't get a shot or who have to wait years to get their shot, are getting their shot in this film, and they're bringing it."

The movie was filmed in the summer of 2005. Three months prior to the start of production, the actors gathered at Atlanta's Skatetown to begin training for the skating sequences in the film. Some had never been on roller skates before. Vaughn Newton, the actors' skate captain, worked with them rigorously, usually practicing five hours a day. "Lauren and the twins, Malika and Khadijah, adapted very quickly," said Newton. "The guys came along a little slower. Al Be, Jason and Jackie Long developed very fast. T.I. was determined to learn. They were all great students and very supportive of each other.”

In addition to the main cast, Robinson decided to include numerous cameos in the film, generally involving people popular in the Atlanta music scene, a core element of the movie. Music producer Jazze Pha played the skating rink's DJ; Rico Wade, a part of the Atlanta-based production team Organized Noize, who also frequented Jellybeans in the early '90s, made an appearance as well. R&B singer Monica, a protégé of producer Austin's, also plays a Waffle House waitress in the film. A few of the south's most sought after music video models made appearances as well including 'Whyte Chocolate' also known as Monique Harris-Ford. There are also cameos from rappers Bone Crusher, Konkrete, and Killer Mike.

Dallas Austin coordinated the music for the film, which executive producer Timothy M. Bourne says is "all new music that's rooted in the Atlanta vibe." Austin had already produced his first feature with Drumline in 2002, and wanted to be sure ATL would be similarly authentic to the culture of his hometown by using its current hip-hop scene as the story's backdrop. Music in the environment of the rink was the way Austin pitched the film "as a way to make a musical without putting Singin' in the Rain on the screen... without the kids breaking into song. I'm determined to show Hollywood and New York the culture from the South."

Under the working title "Jellybean", the film was shot over a span of six weeks in fifty-two locales throughout the city of Atlanta. Filming took place in the summer, sometimes in temperatures over a hundred degrees, challenging the cast and crew's ability to stay motivated. "A lot of times we had to motivate each other to say 'listen, up your game. Go hard,'" said Robinson. "And sometimes we needed to step back, take a breath, so we could get through."

=== Design ===
Chris Robinson and Robb Buono, the film's production designer, decided that the script was composed of two distinct parts—the reality of the teens' lives and the time they spent at the skating rink. According to Buono, "we wanted to look at it [the rink] through rose colored glasses, because when you think back on your memories of that time period—no matter what age you are—you see everything bigger. Our goal was to make that roller skating rink a character that grows as we keep coming back, and each time it's more magical—a Saturday Night Fever-like contrast to the reality of life.” Robinson and Buono chose to shoot at the Cascade Family Skating Rink in Atlanta after visiting and witnessing the energy and excitement of the rink. However, the filmmakers felt Cascade's interior design was too bland and decided it should be redesigned.

Buono chose black and red for the rink's new color palette. Red was used for its intensity and energy, and black was used because the rink would appear larger. Additionally, usage of black would contrast more boldly with the red colors. The ceiling above the rink was removed for lighting purposes. The rink floor was also refinished with darker colors to provide better light reflection. Rigging for the lights became an artistic challenge for Buono. Working with the art department, the rigging electrics and the rigging grips, he designed a wagon wheel effect that moved with the motion of the skating and allowed the lights to be programmed, aesthetically lighting both ends of the rink and capturing the action of the skating sequences. The skate rental section, arcade and snack bar were redesigned at the rink as well, so that the areas besides the skating floor wouldn't feel monotonous. “We did every inch of that rink,” said Buono. “The carpet on the walls, painting the ceiling, putting in the lights, painting the snack bar, changing the color of the tables. We used a lot of neon and bold bright colors.”

== Release ==
=== Box office ===
ATL was released on March 28, 2006, in 1,602 theatres across the U.S. The film grossed at $11,554,404, and ranked third at the box office behind Ice Age: The Meltdown at one and Spike Lee's Inside Man at two; the film's opening weekend was a success. Its second weekend profits were considerably lower, as the film only earned $3,710,215, enough for it to reach seventieth place on the list of widely released films with the biggest weekend drops in the last twenty-six years. The film made less money in the following weekends, and by the end of its theatrical run ATL had accumulated a total of $21,170,563, earning a modest profit against its $7 million production cost.

=== Home video ===
The film was released in the U.S. on DVD and HD-DVD July 18, 2006. DVD features include a behind-the-scenes featurette, deleted scenes, star T.I.'s music video for his single "What You Know," and the film's theatrical trailer. The film was also released on Blu-ray on November 14, 2006.

== Reception ==
=== Critical response ===
On the review aggregation website Rotten Tomatoes, the film averaged a 63% approval rate based on 84 reviews, with an average rating of 5.9/10. The website's critics consensus reads: "Strong lead performances and catchy musical interludes rescue this coming-of-age story from its formulaic script and uneven direction.". On Metacritic the film had a weighted average score of 63 out of 100 based on 25 reviews. Audiences polled by CinemaScore gave the film an average grade of "B" on an A+ to F scale.

ATL received generally positive reviews from critics. At Allmovie, the film was given three stars, and critic Derek Armstrong, in a positive review of the film, stated that the film is only an average coming of age story "because some substance must take a backseat to all this beautifully crafted style." Melissa Walters at BlackFilm.com, while believing some of the writing to be clichéd and the story familiar, also called the film "heartfelt, genuine, and enjoyable." Film critic Roger Ebert awarded the film three stars in his Chicago Sun-Times review, declaring the film "warm" and praising the screenplay's "unforced, genuine affection for its characters."

IGN.com gave the film a 4/5 rating, naming Robinson's directorial debut "masterful."

Ruthe Stein from the San Francisco Chronicle called the film one of the better kind of its genre, praising the performances of the young cast, and the film's star T.I. in particular. At Yahoo! Movies, based on 13 reviews the film has averaged a B− by the critics standards.

Not all reviews of the picture were so enthusiastic. Lisa Schwarzbaum of Entertainment Weekly graded the film a B−, saying that while the skating scenes are a blast, the film stumbles when it attempts to be too much for too many audiences. Neil Genzlinger of The New York Times said he was surprised that with so many untested actors rounding out the main cast, "the most amateurish thing about it is the script." Genzlinger also called the screenplay cliché-marred and predictable, while giving credit to the young actors of the film. He was also critical of Chris Robinson's direction, stating that he "can't stay with a scene long enough to let his actors build momentum." At The Atlanta Journal-Constitution, Bob Longino provided a negative review of the movie, pointing it out as "boring, uninteresting, and slow". Longino said that T.I. and Big Boi's performances improved as the film progressed, and that there were a few laugh-out-loud comedic moments in the film.

=== Accolades ===
Year	Award	Category	Recipient	Result
2006	BET Hip Hop Awards	Best Hip Hop Movie	Chris Robinson	Won
2006	Black Movie Awards	Outstanding Achievement in Directing	Chris Robinson	Nominated
2006	Black Movie Awards	Outstanding Achievement in Screenwriting	Tina Gordon Chism	Nominated
2006	Black Movie Awards	Outstanding Motion Picture	Dallas Austin, Jody Gerson, James Lassiter, Will Smith, Tionne "T-Boz" Watkins	Nominated
2006	Black Movie Awards	Outstanding Performance by an Actress in a Supporting Role	Lauren London	Nominated
2007	Black Reel Awards	Best Director	Chris Robinson	Nominated
2007	Black Reel Awards	Best Screenplay, Original or Adapted	Tina Gordon Chism	Nominated
2007	NAACP Image Awards	Outstanding Directing in a Feature Film/Television Movie (Comedy or Drama)	Chris Robinson	Nominated

== Possible sequel ==
On January 7, 2015, Chris Robinson posted a teaser poster of the sequel on Instagram with the main cast in it confirming that a sequel is in the works. On March 4, 2015, T.I. confirmed on his Instagram that an ATL 2 is set to be released. In 2021, after years of being believed to be in development hell, Robinson posted a teaser trailer for the sequel featuring most of the original main cast.

== See also ==
- List of hood films

Awards
BET Hip Hop Award
Preceded by N/A	Hip Hop Movie of the Year; 2006	Succeeded by Stomp the Yard
