= Urban Legend (album) =

Studio album by T.I.
- Released: November 30, 2004
- Genre: Southern hip-hop; trap; gangsta rap
- Length: 71:35
- Label: Grand Hustle; Atlantic
- Producer: David Banner; Daz Dillinger; DJ Toomp; Jazze Pha; Lil Jon; Kevin "Khao" Cates; KLC; Mannie Fresh; The Neptunes; Nick "Fury" Loftin; Sanchez Holmes; Scott Storch; Swizz Beatz

T.I. chronology
Trap Muzik (2003)	Urban Legend (2004)	King (2006)

Singles from Urban Legend
- 1. "Bring Em Out" Released: October 19, 2004; 2. "U Don't Know Me" Released: January 11, 2005; 3. "ASAP" Released: May 24, 2005

Urban Legend is the third studio album by American rapper T.I., released on November 30, 2004, through Atlantic Records and his own label, Grand Hustle Records. The album features production provided by longtime collaborating producers DJ Toomp, Jazze Pha, Lil Jon, The Neptunes, Nick "Fury" Loftin, David Banner and Sanchez Holmes. New producers contributing to the album include Daz Dillinger, Kevin "Khao" Cates, KLC, Mannie Fresh, Scott Storch and Swizz Beatz. Featured guests on the album include Trick Daddy, Nelly, Lil Jon, B.G., Mannie Fresh, Daz Dillinger, Lil Wayne, Pharrell, P$C, Jazze Pha and Lil' Kim.

The album debuted at number seven on the US Billboard 200, selling 193,000 copies in its first week of release. It also debuted atop the magazine's Top R&B/Hip-Hop Albums and Top Rap Albums charts. The album's official lead single, "Bring Em Out", was released on October 19, 2004 and became T.I.'s first's top 10 hit, peaking at number nine on the US Billboard Hot 100 chart, while the second single, "U Don't Know Me", peaked at number 23 on the chart. The third single, "ASAP", reached number 75 on the chart, number 18 on the Hot R&B/Hip-Hop Songs and number 14 on the Hot Rap Tracks charts. T.I. created a video for "ASAP"/"Motivation". However, "Motivation" only made it to number 62 on the Hot R&B/Hip-Hop Songs chart music chart.

== Background ==
In March 2004, a warrant was issued for T.I.'s arrest after a violation of probation that resulted from a 1997 arrest on cocaine distribution and the manufacturing and distribution of a controlled substance. He was sentenced to three years in prison. While imprisoned in Cobb County, Georgia, he filmed an unauthorized music video. After T.I. received his sentence, he was granted a work release program that allowed him to continue making music and proceeded to record several albums' worth of material. Recording sessions took place at P.S. West Studios, Silent Sounds Studios, and Stankonia Studios, all located in T.I.'s native Atlanta, Georgia. One recording session took place at the Orange Grove Studios in Los Angeles, California.

== Release and promotion ==
=== Singles ===
"Bring Em Out" was the first official single to be released from Urban Legend. The single entered the US Billboard Hot 100 chart at number nine, it also charted at number six on the Hot R&B/Hip-Hop Songs chart, and at number four on the Hot Rap Tracks music chart. In the United Kingdom the single entered the UK Singles Chart music chart at number 59. "Bring Em Out" became T.I.'s first top-ten single to enter the Billboard Hot 100 chart. "Bring Em Out" was certified gold by the RIAA for sales of over 500,000 copies in the US.

"U Don't Know Me" was the second official single from the album. It entered the US Billboard Hot 100 chart at number 23. It charted at number six on the Hot R&B/Hip-Hop Songs chart, number four on the Hot Rap Tracks chart, and number 65 on the Pop 100 music chart. The song was nominated for Best Rap Solo Performance at the Grammy Awards, Best Rap Video at the MTV Video Music Awards and Street Anthem of the Year at the Vibe Awards. It was certified platinum by the RIAA for selling over a million copies in the US.

"ASAP" was the third and final official single from the album. It entered the Billboard Hot 100 chart at number 75. It charted at number 18 on the Hot R&B/Hip-Hop Songs chart and at number 14 on the Hot Rap Tracks chart. It was certified gold by the RIAA for selling over 500,000 copies in the US. On the B-side of the single the song "Motivation" appeared, which charted at number 62 on the Hot R&B/Hip-Hop Songs music chart.

== Critical reception ==
Professional ratings
Review scores
Source	Rating
Allmusic	3.5/5 stars
Entertainment Weekly	B+
Prefix	7/10
RapReviews	8/10
Rolling Stone	2/5 stars

Upon its release, Urban Legend received generally favorable reviews from most music critics. Allmusic writer Andy Kellman opined that, "With all that chaos surrounding T.I., it's disappointing to hear him retracing his steps, rewriting old lines, developing with little progress. Perhaps it's asking too much to expect T.I. to show as much growth here as he did on Trap Muzik, but -- as is the case with Jadakiss -- remaining patient for that classic album (and you know he has one in him) is getting tough." Chuck Mindehall of Entertainment Weekly, in his review of the album, wrote, "when [T.I.] declares "I'm the King," you just about believe him." Tom Breihan of the Baltimore City Paper stated that although "T.I.’s flow is more focused and confident than it was on his 2003 breakthrough, Trap Muzik [...] the new album feels like a thrown-together collection instead of a unified work." Steve "Flash" Juon of RapReviews stated that "If [T.I.] can stay clean and out of prison [...] there seems to be no limit to how far he can go." Less impressed, Rolling Stone's Jon Caramanica wrote: "On Legend, T.I. claims victory but is still looking over his shoulder. The tension is audible in the generally joyless production, which is all ponderous drum machines and terror synths. Still, T.I. is a top lyricist."

== Commercial performance ==
Urban Legend debuted at number seven on the US Billboard 200 chart, selling 193,000 copies in its first week. This became T.I.'s second US top-ten debut and first to top the latter. The album also debuted at number one on both the Top Rap Albums and the Top R&B/Hip-Hop Albums. On March 3, 2005, it was certified platinum by the Recording Industry Association of America (RIAA), for sales of over a million copies in the United States. By February 2006, Urban Legend had sold 1.3 million copies in the United States, according to Nielsen SoundScan. On September 18, 2024, it reached 2x Platinum status in the United States.

== Track listing ==
Urban Legend track listing
No.	Title	Writer(s)	Producer(s)	Length
1.	"Tha King"	Clifford Harris; Joseph Simmons; Joseph Simmons; Darryl McDaniels; Nick "Fury" Loftin	Loftin	3:24
2.	"Motivation"	Harris; Aldrin Davis	DJ Toomp	3:34
3.	"U Don't Know Me"	Harris; Davis	DJ Toomp	4:03
4.	"ASAP"	Harris; Marquinarius Holmes	Sanchez Holmes	4:44
5.	"Prayin for Help"	Harris; Dexter Wansel; Cynthia Biggs; M. Holmes	Sanchez Holmes	4:22
6.	"Why U Mad at Me"	Harris; Isaac Hayes; Kevin "Khao" Cates	Cates	3:53
7.	"Get Loose" (featuring Nelly)	Harris; Phalon Alexander; Cornell Haynes; William Hart; Thom Bell	Jazze Pha	4:12
8.	"What They Do" (featuring B.G.)	Harris; Craig Lawson	KLC	3:48
9.	"The Greatest" (featuring Mannie Fresh)	Harris; Byron Thomas	Mannie Fresh	4:22
10.	"Get Ya Sh*t Together" (featuring Lil' Kim)	Harris; Scott Storch; Kimberly Jones	Storch	4:05
11.	"Freak Though" (featuring Pharrell)	Harris; Pharrell Williams; Chad Hugo	The Neptunes	3:43
12.	"Countdown"	Harris; Lavell Crump	David Banner	4:55
13.	"Bring Em Out"	Harris; Sean Carter; Kasseem Dean; Kenneth Gamble; Roland Chambers; Bell	Swizz Beatz	3:36
14.	"Limelight" (featuring P$C)	Harris; Cates; Akeem Lawal; Leon Sylvers III; Nathaniel Josey; Sean Merrett; Cortez Thomas	Khao	5:03
15.	"Chillin with My B*tch" (featuring Jazze Pha)	Harris; Alexander; Storch	Storch	3:56
16.	"Stand Up" (featuring Trick Daddy, Lil Wayne & Lil Jon)	Harris; Dwayne Carter; Jonathan Smith; Maurice Young	Lil Jon	4:42
17.	"My Life" (featuring Daz Dillinger)	Harris; Delmar Arnaud; Stuart Jordan	Dillinger	5:13
Total length:				71:35

iTunes deluxe edition bonus tracks
No.	Title	Writer(s)	Producer(s)	Length
18.	"Drug Related"	Harris; Chad "Wes" Hamilton; Ryan Presson; Willie Hutch	Hamilton	3:39
19.	"Hustlin' " (featuring Governor)	Harris; Governor Washington, Jr.; Maurice Sinclair	Big Reese	3:21
20.	"Bring Em Out" (video)			3:19
21.	"U Don't Know Me" (video)			4:04
22.	"ASAP" (video) (edited version)			4:17

Sample credits

- "Tha King" contains an interpolation from "King of Rock" and samples from "Hit It Run" by Run-DMC.
- "Prayin for Help" contains samples from the composition "When I'm Gone" by The Jones Girls.
- "Why U Mad at Me" contains excerpts from the composition "Bumpy's Lament" by Isaac Hayes.
- "Get Loose" samples from "Ready Or Not Here I Come (Can't Hide From Love)" by The Delfonics.
- "Bring Em Out" contains samples from the composition "What More Can I Say" by Jay-Z.
- "Limelight" contains samples from "I'll Never Let You Go" by The Sylvers.

== Personnel ==
Credits for Urban Legend adapted from Allmusic.

- Kori Anders – Mixing Assistant
- Big Kuntry King – Performer
- Leslie Brathwaite – Engineer, Mixing
- Greg Gigendad Burke – Art Direction, Design
- Mike Caren – A&R, Engineer
- Chris Carmouche – Engineer, Mixing Assistant
- Kevin Cates – Producer
- Jeremiah Claudius – Assistant Tracking Engineer
- Andrew Coleman – Engineer
- Kevin Crouse – Mixing
- Lavell Crump – Producer
- Daz Dillinger – Producer
- DJ Toomp – Producer
- Mannie Fresh – Producer
- Fury – Producer
- Brian "Big Bass" Gardener – Mastering
- Jason Geter – A&R, Assistant Engineer, Executive Producer
- Sanchez "RockHead" Holmes – Engineer, Producer
- Cameron Huff – Engineer
- Hannah Kang – A&R
- KLC – Audio Production, Producer
- Lil Jon – Audio Production, Producer
- James Lopez – Marketing
- Tony Love – Bass, Guitar
- Jonathan Mannion – Photography
- Josh McDonnell – Mixing Assistant
- Khary Menelik – Mixing Assistant
- The Neptunes – Producer
- Zack Odom – Engineer
- Peaches – Stylist
- John Pirretti – Mixing Assistant
- P$C – Performer
- Bryan Pugh – Mixing Assistant
- Ray Seay – Mixing
- Cyrus Shamir – Engineer
- Nico Solis – Mixing Assistant, Track Engineer
- Scott Storch – Audio Production, Producer
- Storty B – Producer
- Supa Engineer – Mixing
- Swizz Beatz – Audio Production, Producer
- T.I.P. – Executive Producer
- Phil Tan – Mixing
- Tom Tapley – Assistant Engineer
- Chris Theis – Mixing
- Corey Williams – Engineer
- John Frye–Mixing Engineer

== Charts ==
=== Weekly charts ===
Weekly chart performance for Urban Legend
Chart (2004)	Peak position
Japanese Albums (Japanese Albums Chart)	39
US Billboard 200	7
US Top Rap Albums (Billboard)	1
US Top R&B/Hip-Hop Albums (Billboard)	1

=== Year-end charts ===
Year-end chart performance for Urban Legend
Chart (2005)	Peak position
US Billboard 200	39
US Top R&B/Hip-Hop Albums (Billboard)	10

== Certifications ==
Certifications for Urban Legend
Region	Certification	Certified units/sales
United States (RIAA)	2× Platinum	2,000,000^{‡}
^{‡} Sales+streaming figures based on certification alone.
