= Why You Wanna =

Single by T.I.

from the album King
- Released: April 18, 2006
- Recorded: 2005
- Genre: Pop rap
- Length: 3:37
- Label: Grand Hustle; Atlantic
- Songwriters: Clifford Harris; K. Cates; Neal Conway; Crystal Waters; Tei Towa; Bebel Gilberto; Kamaal Fareed; Ali Muhammad; Malik Taylor; James Yancey
- Producer: Kevin "Khao" Cates

T.I. singles chronology
"What You Know" (2006)	"Why You Wanna" (2006)	"Shoulder Lean" (2006)

"Why You Wanna" is a song by American rapper T.I., released as the second official single from his fourth album King (2006). It samples a slowed down keyboard chord from Crystal Waters' "Gypsy Woman (She's Homeless)". The chorus also interpolates rapper Q-Tip's vocals from "Got 'Til It's Gone" with Janet Jackson and "Find a Way" with his group A Tribe Called Quest.

== Chart performance ==
The single peaked at number 29 on the US Billboard Hot 100 chart and spent a total of 20 weeks on the chart. The single also peaked at number five on the Hot R&B/Hip-Hop Songs and number four on the Hot Rap Songs charts. On September 20, 2007, the song was certified gold by the Recording Industry Association of America (RIAA) for sales of over 500,000 copies in the United States.

In Australia, the single debuted at number 55 on the Australian ARIA Singles chart and eventually peaked at number 49.

== Official versions ==
- Why You Wanna (Album Version)
- Why You Wanna (VSO)
- Why You Wanna (Radio Version- Vso Recall Clean)
- Why You Wanna (Amended Album Version)
- Why You Wanna (Benztown Mixdown)
- Why You Wanna (Instrumental)
- Why You Wanna (Remix) (feat. Trey Songz, Smitty & Q-Tip)
- Why You Wanna (Mick Boogie Remix) (feat. Q-Tip) (Official Remix)

== Charts ==
=== Weekly charts ===
Chart (2006)	Peak position
Australia (ARIA)	49
Belgium (Ultratip Bubbling Under Flanders)	6
Belgium (Ultratip Bubbling Under Wallonia)	7
Czech Republic Airplay (ČNS IFPI)	21
Ireland (IRMA)	17
Netherlands (Dutch Top 40 Tipparade)	3
Netherlands (Single Top 100)	43
Scotland Singles (OCC)	32
Switzerland (Schweizer Hitparade)	43
UK Singles (OCC)	22
UK Hip Hop/R&B (OCC)	4
US Billboard Hot 100	29
US Pop Airplay (Billboard)	47
US Hot R&B/Hip-Hop Songs (Billboard)	5
US Hot Rap Songs (Billboard)	4
US Rhythmic Airplay (Billboard)	13

=== Year-end charts ===
Chart (2006)	Position
UK Urban (Music Week)	33
US Billboard Hot 100	95
US Hot R&B/Hip-Hop Songs (Billboard)	23

== Certifications ==
Region	Certification	Certified units/sales
United States (RIAA)	Gold	500,000^{‡}
United States (RIAA) (Mastertone)	Gold	500,000^{*}
^{*} Sales figures based on certification alone.^{‡} Sales+streaming figures based on certification alone.

== Release history ==
Region	Date	Format(s)	Label(s)	Ref.
United States	April 4, 2006	Rhythmic contemporary radio	Atlantic	
United States	July 24, 2006	Contemporary hit radio	Atlantic	
