= King (T.I. album) =

Studio album by T.I.
- Released: March 28, 2006
- Recorded: 2005
- Genre: Southern hip hop
- Length: 75:41
- Labels: Grand Hustle; Atlantic
- Producers: Cool & Dre; DJ Toomp; Just Blaze; Kanye West; Mannie Fresh; Swizz Beatz; Keith Mack; Travis Barker; The Neptunes; Khao; Nick Fury and Tony Galvin

T.I. chronology
Urban Legend (2004)	King (2006)	T.I. vs. T.I.P. (2007)

Singles from King
- 1. "What You Know" Released: January 28, 2006; 2. "Why You Wanna" Released: April 18, 2006; 3. "Live in the Sky" Released: September 5, 2006; 4. "Top Back (Remix)" Released: December 12, 2006

King (stylized as King.), is the fourth studio album by American rapper T.I., released on March 28, 2006, through Grand Hustle Records and Atlantic Records. Recording sessions for the album took one and a half years to complete in late 2005 according to T.I. in an interview with MTV News. Production was handled by several high-profile record producers, including DJ Toomp, Cool & Dre, Just Blaze, Mannie Fresh, Swizz Beatz, Keith Mack, Travis Barker, The Neptunes, Kevin "Khao" Cates, Nick "Fury" Loftin, and Tony Galvin, among others. The album also serves as the soundtrack to T.I.’s feature film debut, ATL.

The album debuted at number one on the US Billboard 200 chart, selling over 522,000 copies in its first week of release in the United States, achieving respectable international charting and produced the two hit singles that attained chart success, including US Billboard hit singles "What You Know" and "Why You Wanna". It was certified gold in sales by the Recording Industry Association of America (RIAA), following shipment in excess of 523,408 copies in the United States. The RIAA later certified the album platinum.

Upon its release, King received general acclaim from music critics, earning praise for its varied musical style, opulent production quality, and T.I.'s dichotomous lyrical themes, and including the hit single "What You Know" where critics praised DJ Toomp's production for the single. The album also earned T.I. several accolades, including Grammy Award nominations for Best Rap Album, Best Rap Song and Best Rap Solo Performance, winning the latter for "What You Know". The album also appeared at the top of several publications year-end lists of top albums.

== Background ==
King was originally set to be released as a soundtrack to T.I.'s film acting debut, ATL. However, due to recording a sufficient amount of material, he proceeded to prepare it as his fourth album as well. T.I. named the album after his son, Clifford "King" Joseph Harris III.

== Recording ==
T.I. confirmed work on his fourth solo album in a 2005 interview with MTV, where he revealed the title King. On November 4, 2005, while on tour with Young Jeezy, T.I. stated that he had begun recording for the album. In late 2005, T.I. told MTV News that he recorded more than 70 songs for the album. However, T.I. continued to record songs for the album right up to the album's deadline. T.I. was happy with the material, describing the album as being "like Trap Muzik on steroids." T.I. stated that the album would show audiences that "my life is not all that it's cracked up to be". T.I. attempted to recruit Jay-Z for a guest verse, but due to scheduling conflicts, Jay-Z was replaced by Common.

== Release and promotion ==
=== Leaks ===
After half of the songs of the album leaked on the Internet in early 2006, T.I. used the leaked tracks, plus a few more new songs to make an album titled Gangsta Grillz: The Leak, which came about after several songs from the King recording sessions leaked onto the Internet.

=== Promo singles ===
"Front Back" was the first official promotional single to be released from King. The song entered the Bubbling Under R&B/Hip-Hop Singles chart at number 11. It featured Port Arthur's own UGK. It had small attention and has helped promote the album. The song is the remake of UGK's 1994 single "Front, Back, Side to Side" from their album Super Tight. The song was produced by Mannie Fresh. "Ride with Me" was the second official promotional single from the album. The single entered the Hot Ringtones chart at number 21, and it charted at number 78 on the Pop 100 chart. The song was produced by Keith Mack. "Top Back" was the third and final official promotional single from the album. The single entered the US Billboard Hot 100 at number 29, it charted at number 13 on the Hot R&B/Hip-Hop Songs chart, it charted at number eight on the Hot Rap Tracks chart, it charted at number 39 on the Pop 100, it charted at number 39 on the Rhythmic Top 40, and at number 27 on the Hot Digital Songs chart. It was produced by Mannie Fresh and released as a single in a remixed version from the album Grand Hustle Presents: In Da Streetz Volume 4. "Top Back" was already getting radio play in its original version before the remix was released. The song was used many times in Making the Band 4 as the contestants did several dances to the instrumental version of this song. The three promotional singles garnered little attention, but helped to promote not only the album, but also ATL.

=== Singles ===
"What You Know" was the first official single to be released from King. The single entered the US Billboard Hot 100 at number three, it charted at number one on the US Hot R&B/Hip-Hop Songs chart, it charted at number 1 on the Hot Rap Tracks chart, it charted at number ten on the Pop 100 chart, it charted at number two on the Hot Digital Songs chart, it charted at number 13 on the Hot Ringtones chart, it charted at number 42 on the Pop 100 Airplay chart, it charted at number two on the Rhythmic Top 40 chart, and at number 39 on the Top 40 Mainstream chart. The song also serves as the theme song to the 2006 film ATL in which T.I. stars. "What You Know" won for "Best Rap Solo Performance" and was nominated for "Best Rap Song" at the 49th Annual Grammy Awards. What You Know" was performed at the 2006 MTV Video Music Awards, where its music video was nominated for two awards. VIBE named T.I.'s "What You Know" as the Top Song of 2006. It was also ranked fourth on a similar list by Rolling Stone, and was #1 in Muchmusic's Top HipHop 2006 List. Pitchfork ranked "What You Know" number 3 on their "Top Tracks of 2006" list, while T.I.'s collaboration on Justin Timberlake's song "My Love" was ranked at number 1. The song is one of the most critically acclaimed of 2006 (arguably T.I.'s most critically acclaimed song), and is one of T.I.'s most successful. It has garnered a 5-star rating from Pitchfork. The song peaked at number three on the Billboard Hot 100, and it also topped the Hot R&B/Hip-Hop Songs chart. In 2008, it was ranked number 68 on VH1's 100 Greatest Songs of Hip Hop. The song was listed at number 38 on Pitchfork's top 500 songs of the 2000s. The song is produced by DJ Toomp from Zone Boy Productions, with additional keys by Wonder Arillo. It utilizes an interpolation of Roberta Flack's version of The Impressions's "Gone Away" and of the song "Hey Joe", written by Billy Roberts but popularised by Jimi Hendrix. The track was rumored to be a diss song directed at fellow Dirty South rapper Lil' Flip. The song is also played during the end credits of ATL. The song was a major smash during the spring of 2006. The RIAA certified the single double platinum.

"Why You Wanna" was the second official single from the album. The single entered the Billboard Hot 100 at number 29, it charted at number five on the Hot R&B/Hip-Hop Songs chart, it charted at number four on the Hot Rap Tracks chart, it charted at number 47 on the Pop 100 chart, it charted at number 39 on the Hot Digital Songs chart, and at number 13 on the Rhythmic Top 40 chart. The single attained respectable international charting. In the United Kingdom the single entered the UK Singles Chart at number 22, in Australia the single entered the Australian Singles Chart at number 49, in Belgium the single entered the Belgium (Ultratop Flanders) chart at number 6, and at number 7 on the Belgium (Ultratop Wallonia) chart. In the Netherlands the single entered the Dutch Top 40 at number 43, in the Republic of Ireland the single entered the Irish Singles Chart at number 17, and in Switzerland the single entered the Swiss Music Charts at number 43. The single samples a slowed down keyboard chord from Crystal Waters' "Gypsy Woman (She's Homeless)". The chorus also interpolates Q-Tip's vocals from Got 'Til It's Gone with Janet Jackson and Find a Way with his group A Tribe Called Quest. The song was produced by Kevin "Khao" Cates. The RIAA certified the single gold.

"Live in the Sky" was the third and final official single from the album. The single entered the Hot R&B/Hip-Hop Songs chart at number 57. The single features Jamie Foxx. The song is mainly about T.I.'s deceased family members and friends who have died in violence, drugs, and even tuberculosis. An alternate version exists with varied lyrics, due to the explicit nature of the original track. The alternate version does not also include the third verse. The song was produced by Keith Mack.

== Critical reception ==
Professional ratings
Aggregate scores
Source	Rating
Metacritic	77/100
Review scores
Source	Rating
AllMusic	4.5/5 stars
The Austin Chronicle	4/5 stars
Blender	4/5 stars
Entertainment Weekly	B+
HipHopDX	3.5/5
Pitchfork	8.4/10
Rolling Stone	2/5 stars
Spin	B+
URB	4/5 stars
USA Today	3.5/4 stars

King received generally positive reviews from music critics. At Metacritic, which assigns a normalized rating out of 100 to reviews from mainstream critics, the album received an average score of 77, based on 18 reviews, which indicates "generally favorable reviews". About.com gave it four out of five stars, stating "with his swagger-jacking charm on the microphone, and enough charisma to convince you that he's really running things in his department, he just might be the Jay-Z of the south. King is not only T.I.'s most captivating album so far, it's probably the best thing to come out of the 'A-Town' lately. And, as Pimp C explains on one of the album's many skits, a 'king' is anyone that handles his business appropriately on the lyrical side of things, and many kings abound in southern rap. With such foraying display of bravado, T.I. has rightfully earned his membership to hip-hop's elite. Royal salute!" AllMusic writer Andy Kellman gave the album a 4.5 out of 5 praising the album's lead single "What You Know", and stating "T.I.'s fourth album isn't the leap forward he's been threatening to make, but it does carry the best set of productions he has been given to work with, and it guarantees that he won't be leaving the singles charts any time soon." Blender Magazine noted on T.I.'s status saying "Before his album sold a surprise half a million copies in its first week of release, T.I. was a Southern star who didn't quite feel like one: He made up with irresistible hooks what he lacked in personality. Now he's a national star who doesn't quite feel like one. A breezily charismatic drug rapper, he's like Jay-Z without the worldview, Young Jeezy without the gravitas; he still hasn't distinguished himself as an artist worth exploring past the singles. Thankfully, he's packed album No. 4 full of singles, which might be just as good. His sonorous, self-assured drawl adds an air of unflustered authority to his alpha brags, and he pours it into unexpected patterns. What he's best at is craft—woozy refrains and hypnotic rhyme schemes—and his fleet of beats is impeccable, highlighted by the four-minute epic 'What You Know,' which laces imperious synths with an intriguing wistfulness. Throughout, producers Just Blaze, Swizz Beatz and DJ Toomp back T.I.'s self-deifying spiels with wild bombast: he'd seem a lot less kingly if it weren't for his court."

Pitchfork stated "T.I. has always been a great rapper, warm and fluid and confident, his loose elastic voice winding under tracks with force and finesse. Before every other mainstream rapper was talking about drugs, he was doing it with a weary lived-in authority, proudly defiant and sheepishly defensive at the same time, bragging about getting money but lamenting the fact that he only had one way to do it. But great rappers don't always make great albums, and every one of T.I.'s previous full-lengths had a fatal flaw: desperate grabs at radio love, grossly insincere sex-jams, cobbled-together non-cohesion, or all three. Last summer, I thought Young Jeezy's Let's Get It: Thug Motivation 101 (2005) was the album T.I. should've made. Young Jeezy isn't half the rapper that T.I. is, but his album-- stunning in its focus and monolithic swagger and deeply nihilistic in worldview-- had more cinematic sweep than anything his progenitor had ever done." Matt Cibula of PopMatters described the album as a stunning classic saying that "Clifford 'T.I.' Harris is one of America's greatest songwriters. I'm not just talking about hip-hop, either—even if you add in all the other genres that people go all gaga over, T.I. strides this narrow world like a colossus. No one is smarter, no one constructs tighter songs, and no one has more ways to score. This is proven over and over again on King. T.I. is the whole package: gritty, smooth, smart, dangerous, introspective, and wise. And while it's pretty early in 2006 to talk about albums of the year, this record says it's time to start talking." Stylus Magazine noted "T.I.'s path to a self-made mythology hinges not just on his ability to trumpet himself, but to make his locale and history vital. King, T.I.'s latest, proves, among other things, that his legacy is tied into his town, and his town, Atlanta, is the true Southern metropolis: primal, spiritual, refined, and delicate at the same time. New Orleans may have the painful religious symbolism, Memphis the working-class spirit, and Houston the expansive, halting sound, but Atlanta is the melting pot of bourgeoisie, aristocracy, and neighborhood hustlers. Lil Wayne may be the chaperone of this coast, but T.I. is the CFO. Song to song production is generally top-shelf. From barn-burning 'Top Back' to the slyly tender 'Gone,' every chime chimes when it's supposed to, every snare clacks right into place. Individually, Grand Hustle in-house rising star Toomp gobbles up the lion's share of the praise: the cataclysmic 'What You Know' and ostentatious 'Bankhead' both soar. Mannie Fresh and Just Blaze inlay T.I.'s lines with velveteen strings and swirling drums respectively. King isn't complacent enough to act like all the wars are fought and all the gods are dead; T.I. sees his legacy and city very much up for grabs. A city, a scene and his legacy are unfinished, and while King won't be T.I.'s last, or, hopefully, best section of his mosaic, it's the perfection of his aesthetic thus far."

The New York Times said the album had "Memorable refrains, hard beats, elegant rhymes: this album succeeds mainly by sticking to a simple but effective formula." Entertainment Weekly stated "Though long at 18 tracks, King still [has] plenty of heavyweight hits." The Village Voice's Makkada B. Selah opined that "Anyone disputing T.I.'s claim to the title 'King of the South' has been summarily silenced by the pageant King's release. The self-proclaimed Dick Cheney of rap showcases many styles, each track here is a multi-layered, highly nuanced production." Sputnikmusic's Joe Schmoh noted "T.I. has always been a prime example of an excellent mainstream rapper from the south. He exudes confidence with every single breath he breaths over the microphone, swinging comfortably from snare hit to snare hit like Tarzan of the beats. However, whether it's Ludacris, Rick Ross, or T.I., the problems are all the same. T.I. has no idea at all how to balance an album together. At least he didn't until he went towards recording King, an album whose title obviously aims towards magnum opus, a record that balances T.I.'s softer side done right with effortless gruff confidence placed on balling records. Basically, King shows T.I. ripping to his full potential. With women, he's evolved into this sort of country gentlemen, and he shows this over swelling, swollen synthesizers that make his softer side truly something to behold. And yet, it seems like what the real shine still are the bangers. Even the weak tracks sound strong due to T.I.'s superfluous confidence. Normally, records like this just sound like wastes of good beats, but T.I. serves these beats with pure swag and rhythmic ability. He doesn't even need to rhyme about anything important or relevant, he's got enough fun punchlines and self-confidence to cover that up. T.I. manages to spend the entire record outshining every single guest, making every beat his own, and even being respectful to the ladies as opposed to misogynistic. Overall, a triumph." The Austin Chronicle's Robert Gabriel stated "Respected from East to West like he was running the Mob, T.I. ascends the throne of rap regality on his fourth LP. Consistent as it is tenacious, King's effortless flow over top-grade beats comes courtesy of Mannie Fresh, Just Blaze, and DJ Toomp, and as the synth-laden 'What You Know' has already made the job of radio programmers that much easier, T.I.'s transcends flash-in-the-pan status with a swagger unmatched in hip-hop. T.I.'s Southern drawl bends pedestrian phrases into irresistible melodies hotter than the summer streets to come."

=== Accolades ===
The album appeared on several music critics' and publications' end-of-year albums lists. Pitchfork placed the album at number 147 on their list of top 200 albums of the 2000s. Spin placed the album at number 14 on its 40 Best Albums list for 2006. Stylus Magazine placed the album at number 14 on its list of their Top 50 Albums of 2006. Paste named it the 81st on its list of their Top 100 Albums of 2006. Sia Michel of The New York Times named it the 9th best album of 2006.

At the 49th Annual Grammy Awards, T.I. was nominated with a total of three nominations, including Grammy Award for Best Rap Album, Grammy Award for Best Rap Solo Performance and Grammy Award for Best Rap Song for the smash hit single "What You Know". He won the Grammy award for Best Rap Solo Performance for "What You Know".

== Commercial performance ==
King debuted at number one on the US Billboard 200, selling over 522,000 copies in its first week of release from the promotion of his debut film ATL and the smash single, "What You Know". This became T.I. first number-one debut on the chart and his third top-ten album. In its second week, the album dropped to number three on the chart, selling an additional 185,000 copies. In its third week, slipped to number five on the chart, selling 136,000 copies that week. In its fourth week, remained at number five on the chart, selling 86,000 more copies. On April 25, 2006, the album was certified platinum by the Recording Industry Association of America for sales of over a million copies in the United States.

King attained respectable international charting. In New Zealand the album entered the New Zealand Albums Chart at number two, in Canada the album entered the Canadian Albums Chart at number 24, in France the album entered the French Albums Chart at number 36, in Japan the album entered the Japanese Albums Chart at number 26, in Switzerland the album entered the Swiss Albums Chart at number 99, and in the United Kingdom the album entered the UK Albums Chart at number 83. In Canada, the Canadian Recording Industry Association certified the album gold for sales of over 50,000 copies in Canada.

== Track listing ==
(NOTE: newer pressings of the album have removed all "skit" sections, including "The Breakup," "Pimp C Skit," and "Phone Call.")

No.	Title	Writer(s)	Producer(s)	Length
1.	"King Back"	Clifford Harris; Justin Smith; Ray Davies	Just Blaze	4:12
2.	"Front Back" (featuring UGK)	Harris; Chad Butler; Bernard Freeman; Byron Thomas; Eric Wright; Andre Young; O'Shea Jackson; The Meters; Freddie Southwell	Mannie Fresh	3:42
3.	"What You Know"	Harris; Aldrin Davis; Donny Hathaway; Curtis Mayfield; Leroy Hutson	DJ Toomp	4:34
4.	"I'm Talkin' to You"	Harris; Smith	Just Blaze	5:40
5.	"Live in the Sky" (featuring Jamie Foxx)	Harris; Keith "Mack" McMasters	Keith Mack	5:46
6.	"Ride wit Me"	Harris; McMasters	Keith Mack	4:04
7.	"Breakup Skit" (featuring Mike Epps)	Darion Holmes	Keith Mack	1:56
8.	"Why You Wanna"	Harris; Kevin Cates; Neal Conway; Crystal Waters; Kamaal Fareed; Ali Shaheed Muhammad; Malik Taylor; James Yancey; Bebel Gilberto; Towa Tei	Kevin "Khao" Cates	3:37
9.	"Get It"	Harris; Kasseem Dean; Enrico Simonetti; Antonio Murri; Dino Verdi	Swizz Beatz	3:40
10.	"Top Back"	Harris; Thomas	Mannie Fresh	4:42
11.	"I'm Straight / Pimp C (skit)" (featuring B.G. & Young Jeezy)	Harris; Christopher Dorsey; Jay Jenkins; S. Graham; Nicholas Loftin	Nick Fury co-prod. The Chosen One	6:35
12.	"Undertaker" (featuring Young Buck, Young Dro & DJ Drama)	Harris; Cates; David Darnell Brown; D'Juan Hart	Kevin "Khao" Cates	4:13
13.	"Stand Up Guy"	Harris; Andre Lyon; Marcello Valenzano	Kevin "Khao" Cates	3:16
14.	"You Know Who"	Harris; Tony Galvin; Solomon Burke	Tony Galvin; Travis Barker (co.)	2:54
15.	"Goodlife / Phone Call (skit)" (featuring Pharrell, Common & Mike Epps)	Harris; Pharrell Williams; Lonnie Rashid Lynn; DMystro Staggs	The Neptunes	4:28
16.	"Hello" (featuring Governor)	Harris; Cates; Governor Washington, Jr.; Todd Rundgren	Kevin "Khao" Cates	3:34
17.	"Told You So"	Harris; McMasters	Keith Mack	4:22
18.	"Bankhead" (featuring P$C and Young Dro)	Harris; Davis; Hart; Nathaniel Josey; Sean Merrett; Ernest Gold	DJ Toomp	4:26

• (co.) Co-producer

Japan bonus track
No.	Title	Writer(s)	Producer(s)	Length
19.	"Drug Related"	Harris; Chad Hamilton; W. Hutch; R. Press	Chad "Wes" Hamilton	3:41

Limited Edition DVD bonus track
No.	Title	Writer(s)	Producer(s)	Length
3.	"Drive Slow (Remix)" (Kanye West featuring T.I., Paul Wall & GLC)	Harris; Kanye West; Paul Slayton; Leonard Harris	Kanye West	5:18

iTunes bonus track
No.	Title	Producer(s)	Length
19.	"You Ain't Fly"	Lil' C	3:47
20.	"In My Hood" (featuring Dre & Mac Boney)	Cool & Dre	3:50

== Limited edition DVD ==
A limited edition of King was released, featuring a DVD. The DVD contained:

- Live concert footage from Houston, Texas.
- Music Video of Front Back featuring UGK.
- A special slide show to accompany the audio of Drive Slow (Remix) (featuring Kanye West, Paul Wall, GLC, & T.I.).

== Sample credits ==
"King Back"

- Excerpts from "Sting Of The Serpent" written and performed by Ray "Funky Trumpet" Davies

"Front Back"

- Contains a vocal sample from "Front Back Side To Side" performed by UGK

"What You Know"

- "Gone Away" performed by Roberta Flack
- Contains a replayed bass sample of "I Believe to My Soul" performed by Donny Hathaway

"I'm Talkin' to You"

- "Nobody Knows" performed by SCLC Operation Breadbasket Orchestra and Choir

"Why You Wanna"

- "Gypsy Woman" performed by Crystal Waters
- Contains re-sung lyrics from "Find a Way" performed by A Tribe Called Quest
- Also Contains re-sung lyrics "Got 'til It's Gone" by Janet Jackson, Joni Mitchell & Q-Tip

"Get It"

- Excerpts from "Molla Tutto" written by Enrico Simonetti, Antonio Murri, & Dino Verdi and performed by Loretta Goggi

"You Know Who"

- "Fight Back" written & performed by Solomon Burke, off the Cool Breeze OST (blaxploitation movie)

"Hello"

- "Hello It's Me" performed by The Isley Brothers

"Drug Related"

- Excerpts from "Love Me Back" written by Willie Hutch

"Drive Slow (Remix)"

- Excerpts From "Wildflower" Performed By Hank Williams

== Personnel ==
Credits for King adapted from Allmusic.

- Travis Barker – Drums, Producer, Programming
- Philip Botti – Executive Producer
- Leslie Brathwaite – Mixing
- Greg Gigendad Burke – Art Direction, Design
- Mike Caren – A&R
- Elliott Carter – Engineer
- K. Cates – Composer
- Spencer Chrislu – Authoring
- Nate Connelly – Assistant Engineer
- Geoff Countryman Flute
- Kannon "Caviar" Cross – Producer
- R. Davies – Composer
- Kevin "KD" Davis – Mixing
- K. Dean – Composer
- David Dieckmann – Authoring
- Sean Donnelly – Design
- Mike Epps – Performer
- Mannie Fresh – Producer
- John Frye – Mixing
- Nick Fury – Producer
- The Chosen One – Producer, composer
- Tony Galvin – Producer
- Brian Gardner – Mastering
- Jason Geter – A&R, Executive Producer, Management
- GLC – Performer
- E.J. Gold – Composer
- Robert Gold – Photo Production
- C. Harris – Composer
- L.D. Harris – Composer
- L. Hutson – Composer
- Just Blaze – Producer
- Hannah Kang – A&R
- Gimel Keaton – Mixing
- Anthony Kilhoffer – Engineer
- Christian Lantry – Photography
- Lil Mack – Producer
- Dayna D'Mystro Staggs – Producer
- Kevin "Coach K" Lee – Co–Executive Producer, A&R
- James Lopez – Marketing
- Keith Mack – Producer
- Orlando McGhee – A&R
- Glen Marchese – Mixing
- Manny Marroquin – Mixing
- Mike Mo – Assistant Engineer
- Dawaun Parker – Keyboards
- Orlando Rashid – Engineer
- Richard Reitz – Assistant Engineer, Engineer
- Tony Rey – Engineer
- Shorty B. – Bass, Guitar
- Rawle Stewart – Co–Executive Producer
- Swizz Beatz – Producer
- Phil Tan – Mixing
- Alex Uychocde – Engineer
- C. Waters – Composer
- Kanye West – Producer

== Charts ==
=== Weekly charts ===
Weekly chart performance for King
Chart (2006)	Peak position
Canada Top Albums/CDs (RPM)	24
French Albums (SNEP)	36
German Albums (Offizielle Top 100)	86
Irish Albums (IRMA)	76
Japanese Albums (Oricon)	26
Swiss Albums (Schweizer Hitparade)	99
UK Albums (Official Charts)	83
US Billboard 200	1
US Top R&B/Hip-Hop Albums (Billboard)	1

=== Year-end charts ===
2006 year-end chart performance for King
Chart (2006)	Position
US Billboard 200	21
US Top R&B/Hip-Hop Albums (Billboard)	3

2007 year-end chart performance for King
Chart (2007)	Position
US Top R&B/Hip-Hop Albums (Billboard)	92

== Certifications ==
Certifications for King
Region	Certification	Certified units/sales
Canada (Music Canada)	Gold	50,000^{^}
United Kingdom (BPI)	Silver	60,000^{*}
United States (RIAA)	2× Platinum	2,000,000^{^}
^{*} Sales figures based on certification alone.^{^} Shipments figures based on certification alone.

== See also ==
- List of Billboard 200 number-one albums of 2006
