= PSC (musical group) =

American hip hop group

P$C
- Also known as: Pimp $quad Click
- Origin: Atlanta, Georgia, U.S.
- Genres: Southern hip-hop, trap
- Years active: 2001–present
- Labels: Grand Hustle Records; Atlantic Records (former)
- Members: Big Kuntry King; T.I.; Young Dro; Mac Boney; C-Rod
- Past members: AK; Dolla DP; Cap

PSC or Pimp Squad Click (stylized as P$C or Pimp $quad Click), is an American hip hop group from Bankhead, Atlanta, Georgia. Formed in 2001, the group was originally composed of six members: southern rappers Big Kuntry King, Mac Boney, C-Rod, AK, Young Dro, and T.I. In 2002, the group began amassing several self-released mixtapes, namely their In da Streets series, which garnered them local recognition. PSC released their debut studio album 25 to Life, in 2005, under Grand Hustle Records and Atlantic Records.

== History ==
The group was formed in 2001 by T.I., alongside his longtime friends and fellow Atlanta-based rappers Big Kuntry King, C-Rod, AK, Dollar D.P and Mac Boney. They made their commercial debut on the track "Heavy Chevys", taken from T.I.'s debut solo album, I'm Serious (2001). However, after I'm Serious failed to gain major recognition, Arista Records released T.I. from his recording contract. In 2002, the group released a full-length project together, a mixtape titled In da Streets.

The group's debut studio album 25 to Life, was released in 2005 and received mixed reviews. The album title "25 to Life", refers to the group members' ages at the time. Although the critical reviews were lukewarm, it peaked at number 10 on the US Billboard 200 chart on October 8, 2005. The album features guest appearances from Young Jeezy, Young Dro, CeeLo Green, Lil Scrappy and Lloyd; while its production was handled by Lil Jon, Jasper Cameron and Sapp, among others. P$C's debut single "I'm a King", which was produced by Lil' Jon, features Lil' Scrappy and was included on the soundtrack to the drama film Hustle & Flow (2005). The single reached number 67 on the US Billboard Hot 100 chart.

In 2004, PSC appeared on "Pimp Squad", from American music producer The Alchemist's debut album, 1st Infantry, as well as on the song "Limelight", from T.I.'s third solo album Urban Legend. In 2006, T.I. featured his PSC cohorts on the track "Bankhead", from his fourth album King. In 2008, Big Kuntry King featured PSC on the track "Still Kuntry", from his debut solo album, My Turn to Eat.

In 2008, AK, also known as AK the Razorman, began to show he was disgruntled with T.I. and the label: "I'm an original P$C member. I met T.I. back in 1995; I was six-teen years old and he was four-teen. We put our heads together. He already had a deal in Brooklyn, that's why we made him the leader of the P$C; to lead us out of the streets and into the rap business and that is what happened. When his deal went bad with Arista in 2001 with the I'm Serious album, we didn't leave him nor abort our mission. We didn't leave T.I. behind; we didn't turn our backs on him. We continued to push hard for him. [Big Kuntry and I] came up with our deals and the In da Streets Vol.1 album. You already know the history of how the P$C started. With me being an original member and there from day one, back in the trap days, I was the one who kept T.I.'s head from being shot off. I saved him in the music business as well. Arista did not want to drop his album until he came to them with another hit. That is when myself and Big Kuntry came through with "Heavy Chevy's", it was right on time. We dropped that on him [T.I.] when he thought it was over for him. We got our little check for that and did some shows and got some exposure, it was cool, and nothing was wrong back then; it was all one hundred. But now, a lot of people coming out of Grand Hustle, haven't been promoted as his friends as we were. They weren't the backbone of Grand Hustle like us. We were the first people introduced as T.I.'s group as the click itself. Now you're seeing all these new faces and the old faces haven't even expanded nor done their own thing yet. We're still lingering and waiting around." In a 2011 interview with Inday, a Grand Hustle marketing promoter, he confirmed AK was no longer a part of the Grand Hustle label or PSC.

On May 15, 2017, PSC released a song titled "My Boi".

== Discography ==
=== Studio albums ===
List of albums, with selected chart positions and certifications
Title	Album details	Peak chart positions		
Title	Album details	US	US R&B	US Rap
25 to Life	Released: September 20, 2005; Label: Grand Hustle, Atlantic; Format: CD, digital download	10	4	1

=== Mixtapes ===
List of mixtapes, with year released
Title	Mixtape details
In da Streets	Released: 2002; Label: Self-released; Format: Digital download
In da Streets Part 2	Released: 2003; Label: Self-released; Format: Digital download
In da Streets Part 3	Released: 2003; Label: Self-released; Format: Digital download
Gangsta Grillz Meets T.I. & P$C In da Streets	Released: 2003; Label: Self-released; Format: Digital download
The Indictment	Released: October 31, 2006; Label: Grand Hustle; Format: Digital download

=== Singles ===
List of singles, with selected chart positions, year, and album name
Title	Year	Peak chart positions			Certifications	Album
Title	Year	US	US R&B	US Rap	Certifications	Album
"I'm a King" (featuring Lil Scrappy)	2005	67	16	14	RIAA: Gold	25 to Life and Hustle & Flow OST
"—" denotes a title that did not chart, or was not released in that territory.

=== Guest appearances ===
List of non-single guest appearances, with other performing artists, showing year released and album name
Title	Year	Other performer(s)	Album
"Heavy Chevy's"	2001	T.I.	I'm Serious
"Pimp Squad"	2004	The Alchemist	1st Infantry
"Limelight"	2004	T.I.	Urban Legend
"It's Been Said"	2006	Lil' 3rd	King of Cloverland
"Bankhead"	2006	T.I., Young Dro	King
"Down to the Floor"	2007	Cozmo, Alfamega, Paul Wall	Against All Odds
"Smoke Session"	2009	Fresh, Dao	Tell Me Something Fresh
