= DJ Toomp production discography =

DJ Toomp, an American hip hop record producer from Atlanta, Georgia, has produced, co-produced and remixed the following songs. They are listed here by year, artist, album and title.

== Singles ==
List of singles produced, with selected chart positions and certifications, showing year released and album name
Title	Year	Peak chart positions										Certifications	Album
Title	Year	US	US R&B	US Rap	AUS	CAN	GER	IRE	NZ	SWI	UK	Certifications	Album
"24's" (T.I.)	2003	78	28	15	—	—	—	—	—	—	—		Trap Muzik
"Be Easy" (T.I.)	2003	—	55	—	—	—	—	—	—	—	—		Trap Muzik
"U Don't Know Me" (T.I.)	2005	23	6	4	—	—	—	—	—	—	—	RIAA: Platinum	Urban Legend
"What You Know" (T.I.)	2006	3	1	1	—	—	—	—	—	—	80	RIAA: 2× Platinum	King
"I Luv It" (Young Jeezy)	2006	14	13	7	—	—	—	—	—	—	—	RIAA: Platinum	The Inspiration
"I'm a Fool wit It" (Twisted Black)	2006	—	—	—	—	—	—	—	—	—	—		Street Fame
"Can't Tell Me Nothing"	2007	41	20	8	—	—	—	—	—	—	107	RIAA: 4× Platinum	Graduation
"Good Life" (featuring T-Pain)	2007	7	3	1	21	23	78	24	—	—	23	RIAA: 3× Platinum	Graduation
"Theme Song (Hoggs on Da Grind)" (Slim Thug)	2007	—	—	—	—	—	—	—	—	—	—		Non-album single
"Certified" (Glasses Malone featuring Akon)	2007	—	85	24	—	—	—	—	—	—	—		Beach Cruiser
"I'll Be Lovin' U Long Time" (Mariah Carey featuring T.I.)	2008	58	36	—	—	69	—	—	—	—	84		E=MC²
"Wish You Would" (Ludacris featuring T.I.)	2008	114	118	—	—	—	—	—	—	—	—		Theater of the Mind
"Yeah Ya Know (Takers)" (T.I.)	2010	44	65	—	—	68	—	—	—	—	—		No Mercy
"Got Your Back" (T.I. featuring Keri Hilson)	2010	38	10	4	—	48	—	33	—	—	45	RIAA: Gold	No Mercy
"Trap Back Jumpin" (T.I.)	2012	—	38	10	—	—	—	—	—	—	—		Trouble Man: Heavy Is the Head
"—" denotes a recording that did not chart or was not released in that territory.

== 1988 ==
=== MC Shy D - Comin' Correct in 88 ===
- 01. "I Am Rough" (produced with MC Shy D & Mike Fresh)
- 02. "It's Just My Caddy" (produced with MC Shy D & Mike Fresh)
- 03. "I Don't Want To Treat You Wrong" (produced with MC Shy D & Mike Fresh)
- 04. "I Don't Play" (produced with MC Shy D & Mike Fresh)
- 05. "I Will Go Off Part II" (produced with MC Shy D & Mike Fresh)
- 06. "Atlanta That's Where I Stay" (produced with MC Shy D & Mike Fresh)
- 07. "Shake It" (produced with MC Shy D & Mike Fresh)
- 08. "I Wanna Dance" (produced with MC Shy D & Mike Fresh)
- 09. "Tearin' It Up" (produced with MC Shy D & Mike Fresh)

== 1990 ==
=== MC Shy D - Don't Sweat Me ===
- 01. "I Am Back" (produced with MC Shy D & Michael Sterling)
- 02. "Don't Sweat Me" (produced by MC Shy D & Mike Fresh & Michael Sterling)
- 03. "Got It Good" (produced with MC Shy D & Michael Sterling)
- 04. "You Are Everything" (produced with MC Shy D & Michael Sterling)
- 05. "Groove" (produced with MC Shy D & Michael Sterling)
- 06. "What's All This About" (produced with MC Shy D & Michael Sterling)
- 07. "I Can Make You Dance" (produced with MC Shy D & Michael Sterling)
- 08. "Work It" (produced with MC Shy D & Michael Sterling)
- 09. "G.T.F.O.M.F.B." (produced with MC Shy D & Michael Sterling)

== 1993 ==
=== Parental Advisory (P.A.)- Ghetto Street Funk ===
- 06. "3 B"

== 1994 ==
=== Native Nuttz - The Nativez Are Restless ===
- 01. "Rock Rock On"
- 02. "40 Oz. (Remix)"
- 03. "Skinflower"
- 04. "Pazz Tha Puddin'"
- 05. "Fruit N Slide"
- 06. "All N Da Splendor"
- 07. "Native Luzt"
- 08. "Give A (Shout)"
- 09. "Pissin' On Tha Wallz Of Damnation"
- 10. "Erect From Tha Slumz"
- 11. "40 Oz. (Original)"

== 1997 ==
=== Lil Jon & the East Side Boyz - Get Crunk, Who U Wit: Da Album ===
- 09. "Shawty Freak A Lil Sumtin'"
- 10. "Giddy Up Let's Ride - Giddy Up Let's Ride Outro"
- 13. "Cut Up"

== 1999 ==
=== Jim Crow - Crow's Nest ===
- 02. "Bandits"

== 2001 ==
=== T.I. - I'm Serious ===
- 01. "Intro"
- 03. "Dope Boyz"
- 06. "Why I'm Serious (Interlude)"
- 08. "Do It"
- 15. "Heavy Chevys"
- 17. "Outro"

== 2003 ==
=== T.I. - Trap Muzik ===
- "Trap Muzik" (co produced by San "Chez" Holmes and T.I.)
- "Be Easy"
- "24's"
- "Look What I Got"
- "Bezzle"

== 2004 ==
=== Kavious - Murder Dog - Celebrating 10 Years ===
- "Where You From"

=== Ludacris - The Red Light District ===
- 14. "Two Miles an Hour"

=== T.I. - Urban Legend ===
- 02. "Motivation"
- 03. "U Don't Know Me"

=== Pastor Troy - By Any Means Necessary ===
- 03. "Ridin Big"

== 2005 ==
=== Benzino - Arch Nemesis ===
- 10. "What's Really Good" (featuring Scarface & Young Hardy)

=== Boyz n da Hood - Boyz n da Hood ===
- 07. "Don't Put Your Hands On Me"

=== Disturbing tha Peace - Disturbing tha Peace ===
- 12. "Two Miles an Hour (Remix)" (performed by Ludacris & Playaz Circle)

== 2006 ==
=== Da BackWudz - Wood Work ===
- 04. "Gettin' 2 It" (featuring Killer Mike)

=== Pitbull - El Mariel ===
- 03. "Come See Me"

=== T.I. - King ===
- 03. "What You Know" (co-produced by Wonder)
- 18. "Bankhead" (featuring P$C & Young Dro)

=== Rick Ross - Port of Miami ===
- 12. "White House"

=== Turk - Still a Hot Boy ===
- 01. "Live from the Lab" (featuring Ke'Noe)
- 02. "Get It How I Live" (featuring Ke'Noe & S.S.)
- 05. "I Ain't Never Heard" (featuring Chamillionaire, Ke'Noe & S.S.) (co-produced by Ke'Noe)
- 06. "Calling Out" (featuring Bun B & S.S.)
- 07. "Life is a Gamble 2 (Remix)"

=== Ludacris - Release Therapy ===
- 06. "Mouths to Feed"

=== Young Jeezy - The Inspiration ===
- 05. "I Luv It"
- 15. "I Got Money" (featuring T.I.)

== 2007 ==
=== Jay-Z - American Gangster ===
- 11. "Say Hello"

=== 8Ball & MJG - Ridin High ===
- 15. "Worldwide"

=== Young Buck - Buck the World ===
- 09. "Pocket Full of Paper"

=== Bone Thugs-N-Harmony - Strength & Loyalty ===
- 13. "Sounds The Same"

=== Twisted Black - Street Fame ===
- 12. "I'm a Fool Wit It"

=== Kanye West - Graduation ===
- 05. "Good Life" (featuring T-Pain, co-produced by Kanye West)
- 06. "Can't Tell Me Nothing" (co-produced by Kanye West)
- 13. "Big Brother"

== 2008 ==
=== Mariah Carey - E=MC² ===
- 08. "I'll Be Lovin' U Long Time"

=== Rick Ross - Trilla ===
- 09. "This Me"

=== Nas - Untitled ===
- 09. "N.I.G.G.E.R. (The Slave and the Master)"

Leftover

- 00. "Queens Wolf"

=== The Game - LAX ===
- 10. "House of Pain"

=== Young Jeezy - The Recession ===
- 01. "The Recession (Intro)"

=== Ludacris - Theater of the Mind ===
- 03. "Wish You Would" (featuring T.I.)

=== T.I. - Paper Trail ===
- 01. "56 Barz"
- 12. "Every Chance I Get"

=== San Quinn - From a Boy to a Man ===
- 00. "Bring Game To The Table

== 2009 ==
=== Rick Ross - Deeper Than Rap ===
- 13. "Valley of Death" (co-produced by Khao)

== 2010 ==
=== Game - The Red Room ===
- 06. "Never Stop Hustlin" (featuring Fabolous) (produced with Rico Law)

=== Kanye West - My Beautiful Dark Twisted Fantasy ===
- 12. "Blame Game" (featuring John Legend & Chris Rock) (co-produced by Kanye West)

=== T.I. - Fuck a Mixtape ===
- 06. "Yeah Ya Know (Takers)"
- 13. "Really Living Like That"
- 13. "Got Your Back" (featuring Keri Hilson) (Bonus Track)

=== Rick Ross - The Albert Anastasia EP ===
- 13. "Nasty"

=== T.I. - No Mercy ===
- 07. "Big Picture"

=== Game - Brake Lights ===
- 11. "Phantom of the Opera" (featuring Robin Thicke)

== 2011 ==
=== Glasses Malone - Beach Cruiser ===
- 04. "Certified" (featuring Akon)

=== Wale - The Eleven One Eleven Theory ===
- 07. "Barry Sanders"

=== Wale - Ambition ===
- 04. "Legendary"
- 13. "No Days Off"

=== Alley Boy - Definition of Fuck Shit Pt. 2 ===
- 12. "For Certain"

=== Lil Eazy-E - Prince of Compton ===
- 01. "What We're Claiming"

== 2012 ==
=== T.I. - F*ck da City Up ===
- 11. "Who What When" (featuring Meek Mill & Yung Booke)

=== Pitbull - Original Hits ===
- 11. "Come See Me"

=== DJ Khaled - Kiss the Ring ===
- 12. "Outro (They Don't Want War)" (featuring Ace Hood)

=== T.I. - Trouble Man: Heavy Is the Head ===
- 03. "Trap Back Jumpin'"
- 14. "Who Want Some"

=== Curren$y - Priest Andretti ===
- 02. "Money Machine Pt. 2"

=== Rocko - Wordplay ===
- 11. "Oddz"

== 2013 ==
=== Curren$y - New Jet City ===
- 13. "Drive" (featuring Styles P & Young Roddy)

=== 2 Chainz - B.O.A.T.S. II: Me Time ===
- 13. "Black Unicorn" (featuring Chrisette Michele & Sunni Patterson)

== 2014 ==
=== T.I. - Paperwork ===
- 13. "On Doe, On Phil" (featuring Trae tha Truth)

Leftover

- 00. "Turn It"

=== Rick Ross - Hood Billionaire ===
- 08. "Elvis Presley Blvd." (featuring Project Pat)
- 11. "Quintessential" (featuring Snoop Dogg)

== 2019 ==
=== Nas - The Lost Tapes II ===
- 12. "Queens Wolf"

=== Rick Ross - Port of Miami 2 ===
- 12. "I Still Pray" (featuring YFN Lucci and Ball Greezy)"
