= Ball Greezy =

American rapper

- Born: Kinta Cox; July 26, 1986 (age 40); Miami, Florida U.S.
- Genres: Hip hop; trap; Southern hip-hop; Miami Bass
- Occupations: Rapper; songwriter
- Years active: 2007–present
- Label: Live House Music Group

Kinta Cox (born July 26, 1986), known professionally as Ball Greezy, is an American rapper from Miami, Florida. He and Florida-based rappers Grind Mode and Ice Billion Berg pioneered the hip-hop subgenre Miami jook. His single "Nice & Slow", featuring Lil Dred, was released for his debut studio album Bae Day (2017), which peaked at No. 27 on the Billboard Hot R&B/Hip-Hop Songs chart. He was also featured on Lil Duval and Snoop Dogg’s single "Smile (Living My Best Life), which reached number 1 in October 2018 on the Billboard R&B/Hip-Hop Airplay chart.

His professional career began in 2007. He released his first single "Shone" in 2008, for his debut album All or Nothing (2008). All or Nothing featured guest appearances from Rick Ross and Flo Rida. In 2017 he released the single "Single You Been Away" featuring Ice Billion Berg, for his album, Bae Day (2017).

== Early life ==
Kinta Cox was born on July 26, 1986, in Miami, Florida to the parents of Franklyn Alexander and Shirlene T. Cox. He has two brothers. His family are from The Bahamas and the Turks and Caicos Islands. He grew up in the Liberty City and Overtown neighborhoods of Miami, and attended Miami Edison Senior High School. Cox grew up and raised in a musical family along with his brothers. He was introduced to music at a young age by his father, and his neighbor and older brothers introduced him to rap.
