= Totally Hits 2004, Vol. 2 =

Compilation album by Various Artists
- Released: October 5, 2004
- Genre: Various
- Label: Warner Music Group/BMG

Various Artists chronology
Totally Hits 2004 (2004)	Totally Hits 2004, Vol. 2 (2004)	Totally Hits 2005 (2005)

Professional ratings
Review scores
Source	Rating
Allmusic	2.5/5 stars

Totally Hits 2004, Vol. 2 is an album in the Totally Hits series that was released on October 5, 2004. It peaked at #19 on the Billboard 200 album chart.

== Track listing ==
1. Kevin Lyttle featuring Spragga Benz - "Turn Me On" 3:21
2. Outkast - "Roses" 4:14
3. Twista - "Overnight Celebrity" 3:55
4. Alicia Keys - "If I Ain't Got You" 3:50
5. Ryan Cabrera - "On the Way Down" 3:33
6. Maroon 5 - "This Love" 3:25
7. Avril Lavigne - "Don't Tell Me" 3:23
8. Mis-Teeq - "Scandalous" 3:58
9. T.I. - "Let's Get Away" 4:17
10. Brandy featuring Kanye West - "Talk About Our Love" 3:37
11. Cassidy featuring Mashonda - "Get No Better" 3:59
12. Monica - "U Should've Known Better" 4:18
13. Fantasia - "I Believe" 4:06
14. Kimberley Locke - "8th World Wonder" 4:03
15. Taking Back Sunday - "A Decade Under the Influence" 4:07
16. Jet - "Cold Hard B****" 3:11
17. Alanis Morissette - "Everything" 3:29
18. The Darkness - "I Believe in a Thing Called Love" 3:36
19. Big & Rich - "Save a Horse (Ride a Cowboy)" 3:21
20. Alan Jackson featuring Jimmy Buffett - "It's Five O'Clock Somewhere" 3:51
