= Wish You Would (disambiguation) =

"Wish You Would" is a song by Ludacris

Wish You Would may also refer to:

- "Wish You Would", a single by Black Widow (band) written Billy Boy Arnold 1971
- "Wish You Would", song by Ivy, written Harrison, Cator, Cator, Rolph, Sarah Records discography 1994
- "Wish You Would", song by Tyler Hubbard

== See also ==
I Wish You Would (disambiguation)
