= Lil Duval =

American comedian

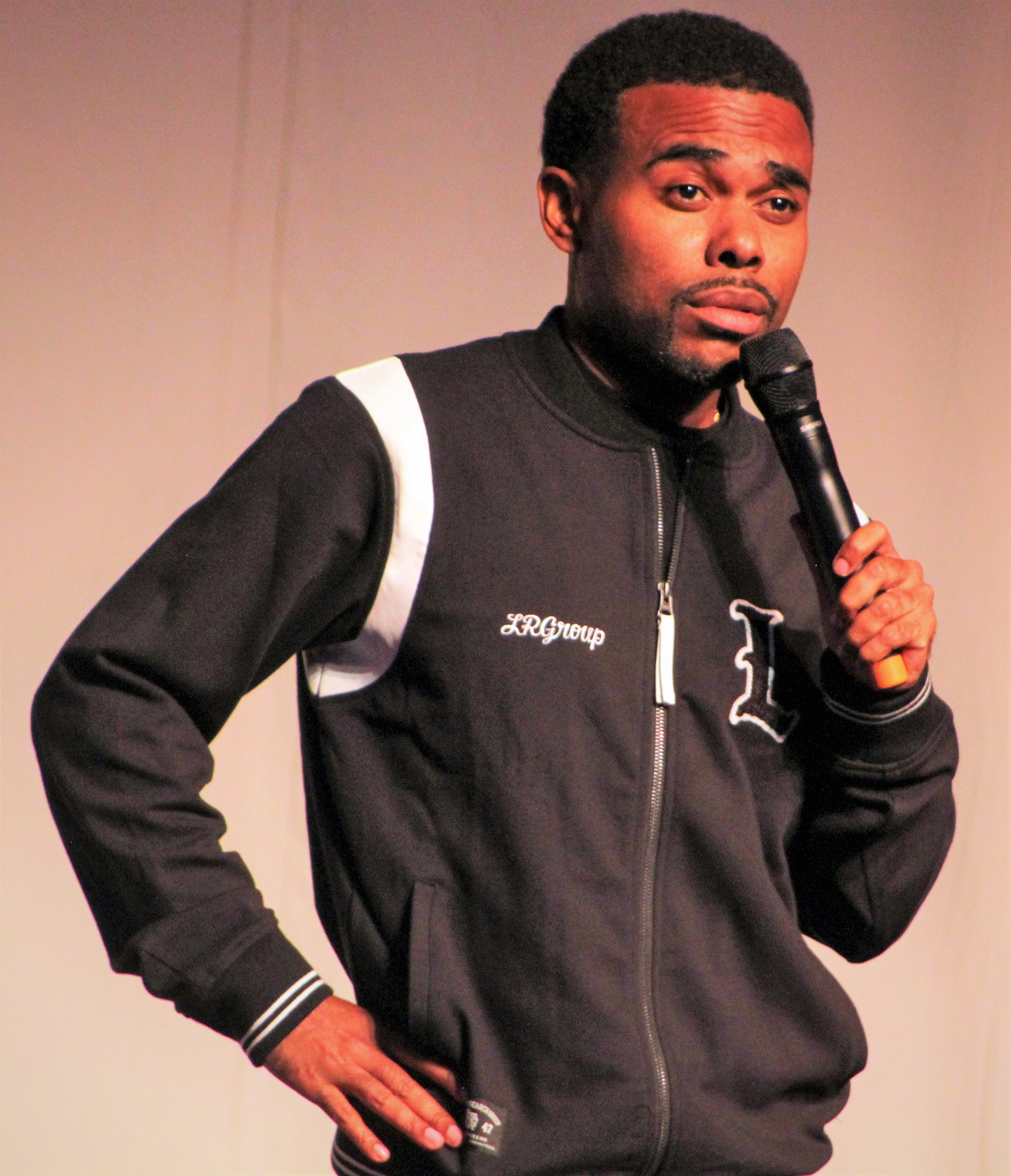
- Powell performs at Frostburg State University in 2015
- Born: Roland Powell; June 12, 1977 (age 49); Jacksonville, Florida, U.S.
- Occupations: Comedian; actor; rapper; singer
- Years active: 2001–present

Comedy career
- Medium: Stand-up; film; television; music industry
- Musical career
- Genres: Hip hop, R&B
- Labels: Grand Hustle; Rich Broke; EMPIRE

Roland Powell (born June 12, 1977), better known by his stage name Lil Duval, is an American stand-up comedian, musician, and actor. In 2005, he was a finalist on BET's comedy competition series Coming to the Stage.

Powell is a series regular to the MTV2 shows Guy Code and Hip Hop Squares. From 2013 to 2014, he hosted the video show Ain't That America on MTV2. In addition to stand-up comedy, Powell also writes for Ozone magazine. He has also appeared in several music videos.

== Early life ==
Roland Powell was born on June 12, 1977 and raised in Jacksonville, Florida. He adopted the stage name "Lil Duval" to pay homage to his birthplace, Duval County, Florida. After graduating from First Coast High School, he relocated to Atlanta, Georgia. He is of Bahamian descent, his mother is a Bahamian. He frequently visits Nassau, Bahamas.

== Career ==
Duval released his first solo single and music video on April 1, 2014, entitled "Wat Dat Mouf Do?" featuring Trae tha Truth. In 2018, he released "Smile Bitch (Living My Best Life)" featuring Snoop Dogg and Ball Greezy, and the single peaked at number 56 on the Billboard Hot 100.

== Filmography ==
- Clean Up Man (2005) – Keith
- Stomp the Yard: Homecoming (2010) – Aaron
- Highway (2012) – Earl
- Scary Movie 5 (2013) – Kendra's Brother
- School Dance (2014) – Bam Bam
- More Money, More Family (2015) – Rudy
- Meet the Blacks (2016) – Cronut
- Grow House (2017) – Darius
- The Trap (2019) – Darryl
- The House Next Door: Meet the Blacks 2 (2021) – Cronut

== Discography ==
=== Singles ===
- "Wat Dat Mouf Do" (2014)
- ''Drop It Off'' (2017)
- "Smile Bitch (Living My Best Life)" featuring Snoop Dogg and Ball Greezy (2018)
- ''Pull Up'' featuring Ty Dolla $ign (2019)
- "Nasty", with Jacquees and Tank (2020)
- "Don't Worry Be Happy" (featuring T.I.) (2020)
- "Big Sexy Thang" with Too Short (2022)

== Music video appearances ==
- "Diamond in tha Back" by Ludacris
- "Smile Bitch" by Lil Duval feat. Snoop Dogg & Ball Greezy
- "Get Low" by Lil Jon & The East Side Boyz
- "Rubber Band Man" by T.I.
- "24's" by T.I.
- "Be Easy" by T.I.
- "Whatever You Like" by T.I.
- "What Up, What's Haapnin' by T.I.
- "No Matter What" by T.I.
- "That's Right" by Big Kuntry King
- "Ain't I" by Yung L.A.
- "Fairytales" by Wale
- "It's Goin' Down" by Yung Joc
- "Coffee Shop" by Yung Joc
- "Shawty" by Plies
- "My President" by Young Jeezy
- "I'm On 2.0" by Trae tha Truth
- "Lookin' Boy" by Hotstylz
- "Ain't No Way Around It (Remix)" by DJ Drama
- "FDB" by Young Dro
- "Choices (Yup)" by E-40
- "Red Cup" By E-40 Feat. T-Pain, Kid Ink And B.o.B
- "Law" by Yo Gotti
- "Kill 'Em Wit The Shoulders" by Snoop Dogg
- "House Party" by Meek Mill
- "Tattoo" by D4L
- "Shoulder Lean" by Young Dro
- "Can't Go For That" by 2 Chainz feat. Ty Dolla Sign & Lil Duval
- "Drankin N Smokin" by Future feat. Lil Uzi Vert
- ”Freek-A-Leek” by Petey Pablo

== Stand up performances ==
- BET ComicView (2005 and 2013)
- All Star Comedy Jam – Live from Orlando (2012)
- Cedric the Entertainer: Starting Lineup (2002)
