= Totally Hits 2004 =

Compilation album by Various Artists
- Released: May 4, 2004
- Label: BMG/Warner Music Group

Various Artists chronology
Totally Hits 2003 (2003)	Totally Hits 2004 (2004)	Totally Hits 2004, Vol. 2 (2004)

Professional ratings
Review scores
Source	Rating
Allmusic	2.5/5 stars

Totally Hits 2004 is an album in the Totally Hits series. This was the third and final album not to contain a Billboard Hot 100 number-one hit.

== Track listing ==
1. Jet – "Are You Gonna Be My Girl" (3:37)
2. Maroon 5 – "Harder to Breathe" (2:55)
3. Jason Mraz – "You and I Both" (3:37)
4. Kelis – "Milkshake" (3:08)
5. Sean Paul featuring Sasha – "I'm Still in Love with You" (3:34)
6. Ying Yang Twins featuring Lil Jon and the East Side Boyz – "Salt Shaker" (4:10)
7. J-Kwon – "Tipsy" (3:58)
8. T.I. – "Rubber Band Man" (4:38)
9. Alicia Keys – "You Don't Know My Name" (4:29)
10. Christina Aguilera – "The Voice Within" (4:26)
11. Ruben Studdard – "Sorry 2004" (4:21)
12. Justin Timberlake – "I'm Lovin' It" (3:40)
13. Kelly Clarkson – "The Trouble with Love Is" (3:41)
14. Dido – "White Flag" (3:37)
15. Clay Aiken – "Invisible" (4:04)
16. Simple Plan – "Perfect" (4:40)
17. Michelle Branch – "Breathe" (3:30)
18. R. Kelly – "Step in the Name of Love" (Remix) (5:10)
19. Joe – "More & More" (3:46)
20. Missy Elliott – "Pass That Dutch" (3:43)

== Certifications ==
Region	Certification	Certified units/sales
United States (RIAA)	Gold	500,000^{^}
^{^} Shipments figures based on certification alone.
