= 24's (T.I. song) =

2003 single by T.I.

Single by T.I.

from the album Trap Muzik
- Released: 15 April 2003
- Recorded: 2002
- Studio: PS West, Atlanta, Georgia
- Genre: Southern hip-hop; gangsta rap; trap
- Length: 4:42 (Explicit version); 4:22 (Clean version)
- Label: Grand Hustle; Atlantic
- Songwriters: Clifford Harris, Jr.; Aldrin Davis
- Producer: DJ Toomp

T.I. singles chronology
"Never Scared" (2003)	"24's" (2003)	"Be Easy" (2003)

"24's" is a song by American rapper T.I., released in 2003 as the lead single from his second studio album Trap Muzik (2003). It is his first song to enter the US Billboard Hot 100, peaking at number 78 on the chart in 2003. It was also featured in the street racing game Need for Speed: Underground.

== Music video ==
The music video was edited for television standards. The video took place in Atlanta, Georgia, at a location which appears to be a parking lot or a condo with a large number of cars with 24-inch rims parked. At the beginning, comedian Lil Duval is presented in front of a car trying to talk to some girls. In another scene, T.I. is shown rapping and driving a Chevy with Philant Johnson on the passenger side. At the end of the video, Duval and another comedian are shown in front of T.I.'s hotel room, which is filled with women who want to come in. Duval starts singing Jodeci's "Forever My Lady", then it shows T.I. hyping the crowd up. The video contains cameo appearances from DJ Toomp, Lil Duval, Douglas "Dolla D.P. Peterson, Mac Boney and AK, DJ Drama, and Jazze Pha.

== Remix ==
The official remix was released later in the year and features DJ Paul and Juicy J of Three 6 Mafia, along with Big Kuntry King. This remix is also known as "Hypnotized 24's". During the summer, 50 Cent and Young Buck did one of their patented song jackings of T.I.'s "24's", on which they made up a new song using the same beat and the melody. The G-Unit duo named their track "44's and Calicos". T.I. himself later jacked "44's and Calicos" and adds new verses from P$C to go along with 50 and Buck. The song was titled "44's and Calicos II". "Jack my shit, nigga, I don't care", T.I. says during the opening notes. "If you like it, I love it." Both remixes were included on the mixtape Gangsta Grillz Meets T.I. & P$C In da Streets (2003).

== Sampling ==
The melody of the hook was interpolated by rappers Drake and 21 Savage for their 2022 song "Rich Flex". This melody was also interpolated by J. Cole on his 2026 song "Old Dog".

== Charts ==
=== Weekly charts ===
Chart (2003)	Peak position
US Billboard Hot 100	78
US Hot R&B/Hip-Hop Songs (Billboard)	27
US Hot Rap Songs (Billboard)	15
US Rhythmic Airplay (Billboard)	23

=== Year-end charts ===
Chart (2003)	Position
US Hot R&B/Hip-Hop Songs (Billboard)	95
