= Trap Muzik =

Studio album by T.I.
- Released: August 19, 2003
- Genres: Southern hip hop; gangsta rap; trap
- Length: 67:30
- Labels: Grand Hustle; Atlantic
- Producers: Clifford "T.I." Harris; DJ Toomp; Benny "Dada" Tillman; Carlos "Los Vegas" Thornton; Cool & Dre; David Banner; Jazze Pha; Kanye West; Nick "Fury" Loftin; San "Chez" Holmes

T.I. chronology
| I'm Serious (2001) | Trap Muzik (2003) | Urban Legend (2004) |

Singles from Trap Muzik
- 1. "24's" Released: April 29, 2003; 2. "Be Easy" Released: October 7, 2003; 3. "Rubber Band Man" Released: December 30, 2003; 4. "Let's Get Away" Released: June 29, 2004

Trap Muzik is the second studio album by American rapper T.I., released on August 19, 2003, by Atlantic Records and his newly founded record label Grand Hustle. Due to the poor sales on T.I.'s first album, I'm Serious (2001), T.I. asked for a joint venture deal with Arista Records or to be released from his contract; he was subsequently dropped from the label. In 2002, T.I. launched Grand Hustle with his longtime business partner Jason Geter and signed a new deal with Atlantic Records.

The album spawned the hit singles "24's", "Be Easy", "Rubber Band Man", and "Let's Get Away". The album features guest appearances from 8Ball & MJG, Jazze Pha, Bun B and Mac Boney. With T.I.'s longtime record producer DJ Toomp as an executive producer for this album. Trap Muzik debuted at number four on the US Billboard 200 and number two on the US Top R&B/Hip-Hop Albums, selling 110,000 copies in the first week. The album was certified platinum by the Recording Industry Association of America (RIAA).

Upon its release, Trap Muzik received generally favorable reviews from most music critics, who generally regarded it as a major improvement from I'm Serious. In 2012, Complex named the album one of the classic albums of the last decade.

== Background ==
Due to the poor commercial reception of his debut album I'm Serious (2001), T.I. asked for a joint venture deal with Arista Records or to be released from his contract; he was subsequently dropped from Arista. He then formed his own record label, Grand Hustle Records, with his longtime business partner Jason Geter, and began releasing mixtapes with the assistance of one of his disc jockeys, DJ Drama. T.I.'s mixtapes eventually earned attention from record labels such as Warner Bros. Records, Universal Records, Epic Records, and Columbia Records. T.I. ultimately signed a joint venture deal with Atlantic Records that year.

== Music ==
=== Context ===
In an interview with Stereogum, he explained that "It's called trap music, so you know it's gonna be dealing with all aspects of the trap. And if you don't know what the trap is, that's basically where drugs are sold. In this country, the majority of us live in a neighborhood where drugs are sold, whether we like it or not. Whether you in the trap selling dope, whether you in the trap buying dope, whether you in the trap trying to get out – whatever the case may be, I'm trying to deal with all aspects of that lifestyle." Speaking on the album, T.I. explained, "It's informative for people who don't know nothing about that side of life and wonder why somebody they know that live on that side of life act the way they do or do the things they do. So it's informative for them and maybe it can help them deal with these people, help them relate to these people, help them understand, help them to see their point of view a little better".

T.I. also said that his second album showed a different insight to the first. "It's another outlook on the trap. Before, trappin' was cool, but now trappin' ain't cool. It's necessary for some, but no, it ain't cool – even if you a hustler. All the hustlers I know – sellin' dope is the last thing they wanna do. If you a real hustler, you gon' move on to bigger and better things."

=== Production ===
Producers for the album include DJ Toomp, Benny "Dada" Tillman, Carlos "Los Vegas" Thornton, David Banner, Jazze Pha, Kanye West, Nick Fury, San "Chez" Holmes and Ryan "LiquidSound" Katz.

== Release and promotion ==
=== Singles ===
"24's" was the first official single to be released from Trap Muzik. It entered the US Billboard Hot 100 at number 78, it charted at number 27 on the Hot R&B/Hip-Hop Songs chart, and at number 15 on the Hot Rap Tracks chart. "Be Easy" was the second official single from the album, peaking at number 55 on the Billboard Hot R&B/Hip-Hop Songs chart. The single was produced by DJ Toomp.

"Rubber Band Man" was the third official single. It charted reasonably well, peaking at number 30 on the US Billboard Hot 100. It charted at number 15 on the Hot R&B/Hip-Hop Songs chart, and at number 11 on the Hot Rap Tracks chart. David Banner's production was noted by music reviewers, particularly the ascending organ riff that has been described as "hypnotic" and "pure halftime show". The song is included in the hits collections Totally Hits 2004, Crunk Hits Volume 1, and Hip Hop Hits Volume 9. T.I. says the song's title is a reference to his habit of wearing rubber bands around his wrist, a habit that dates back to when he was a drug dealer. Publicity efforts for the single were derailed by T.I.'s arrest in August 2003.

"Let's Get Away" was the fourth and final official single from the album. It entered the Billboard Hot 100 at number 35, it charted at number 17 on the Hot R&B/Hip-Hop Songs chart, at number ten on the Hot Rap Songs chart, and at number 16 on the Rhythmic Top 40.

== Critical reception ==
Professional ratings
Review scores
| Source | Rating |
|---|---|
| AllMusic | 4/5 stars |
| Entertainment Weekly | B− |
| HipHopDX | 3.0/5 |
| Pitchfork | 8.7/10 |
| Rolling Stone | 3/5 stars |
| The Source | 4/5 stars |
| Vibe | 3.5/5 stars |

Trap Muzik was well received. The AllMusic editor, Andy Kellman, wrote that with Trap Muzik, the "promise T.I. showed on his flawed debut is almost fully realized". Vibe's Damien Lemon found that the album's best tracks showcase T.I. rapping unaccompanied, citing "Be Easy" and "T.I. vs. T.I.P." as highlights. Jon Caramanica of Rolling Stone described T.I. as "a hustler with a conscience and a heart" and a "limber linguist... at his best when he's dissecting the minutiae of the game." Raymond Fiore of Entertainment Weekly was more critical, finding his flow and lyrics to be ordinary except on tracks where he "breaks from his static Southern comfort zone".

In 2010, Rhapsody included Trap Muzik in its guide to "coke rap" albums.

== Commercial performance ==
Trap Muzik was a commercial success. It debuted and peaked at number four on the US Billboard 200 and number two on the Top R&B/Hip-Hop Albums, selling 110,000 copies on its first week. On June 1, 2007, the album was certified platinum by the Recording Industry Association of America (RIAA), for shipments and sales of over a million copies in the United States.

== Track listing ==
| No. | Title | Writer(s) | Producer(s) | Length |
|---|---|---|---|---|
| 1. | "Trap Muzik" (featuring Mac Boney) | Clifford Harris; Aldrin Davis; Sanchez Holmes; Nathaniel Josey | T.I.P.; San "Chez" Holmes (co.); DJ Toomp (co.) | 4:00 |
| 2. | "I Can't Quit" | Harris; Benny Tillman; Carlos Thornton | Benny "Dada" Tillman; Carlos "Los Vegas" Thornton | 4:17 |
| 3. | "Be Easy" | Harris; Davis; Gary St. Clair; Timothy O'Brien | DJ Toomp | 3:18 |
| 4. | "No More Talk" | Harris; Holmes; Gary Wright | San "Chez" Holmes | 3:53 |
| 5. | "Doin' My Job" | Harris; Kanye West; Michael Smith | Kanye West | 4:13 |
| 6. | "Let's Get Away" (featuring Jazze Pha) | Harris; Phalon Alexander; Aretha Franklin | Jazze Pha | 4:37 |
| 7. | "24's" | Harris; Davis | DJ Toomp | 4:42 |
| 8. | "Rubber Band Man" | Harris; Lavell Crump | David Banner | 5:47 |
| 9. | "Look What I Got" | Harris; Davis | DJ Toomp | 3:05 |
| 10. | "I Still Luv You" | Harris; Nick "Fury" Loftin; Victor Carstarphen; Gene McFadden; John Whitehead | Nick Fury | 4:58 |
| 11. | "Let Me Tell You Something" | Harris; West; Roger Troutman | Kanye West | 3:40 |
| 12. | "T.I. vs. T.I.P." | Harris | T.I.P. | 3:52 |
| 13. | "Bezzle" (featuring 8Ball & MJG & Bun B) | Harris; Premro Smith; Marlon Goodwin; Bernard Freeman | DJ Toomp | 4:54 |
| 14. | "Kingofdasouth" | Harris; Holmes | San "Chez" Holmes | 5:00 |
| 15. | "Be Better Than Me" | Harris; Andre Lyon; Marcello Valenzano | Cool & Dre | 5:00 |
| 16. | "Long Live da Game" | Harris; Holmes | San "Chez" Holmes | 2:14 |

2007 Japan Bonus tracks
| No. | Title | Producer(s) | Length |
|---|---|---|---|
| 17. | "No Sweat" ((featuring JR & Big Kuntry King)) | Keith Mack | 4:40 |
| 18. | "Rubber Band Man" (Remix) (featuring Twista, Trick Daddy & Mack 10) | David Banner | 4:32 |

Sample credits

- "Be Easy" contains samples of "Somebody To Love", written by Gary St. Clair and Timothy O'Brien, and performed by Al Wilson.
- "No More Talk" contains samples of "Can't Find The Judge", written and performed by Gary Wright.
- "Doin' My Job" contains samples of "I'm Just Doing My Job", written by Michael Smith, and performed by Bloodstone.
- "Let's Get Away" contains samples of "Day Dreaming", written and performed by Aretha Franklin.
- "I Still Luv You" contains excerpts from "She Only A Woman", written by Victor Carstarphen, Gene McFadden, and John Whitehead, and performed by The O'Jays.
- "Let Me Tell You Something" contains excerpts from "I Want to Be Your Man", written by Roger Troutman.

== Personnel ==
Credits for Trap Muzik adapted from Allmusic.

- Bosko – talk box
- Leslie Brathwaite – mixing
- Mike Caren – A&R, editing
- Lavell Crump – producer
- Mike Davis – assistant engineer
- Christina Dittmar – art direction
- DJ Toomp – executive producer, producer
- Steve Fisher – engineer, mixing assistant
- Fury – producer
- Brian Gardner – mastering
- Jason Geter – executive producer, management
- Mark "Exit" Goodchild – engineer
- Vance Hornbuckle – assistant engineer
- Jazze Pha – producer, Vocals
- Kevin Knight – photography
- James Lopez – marketing
- Craig Love – guitar
- Mac Boney – performer
- Manny Marraquin – mixing
- Chris Morris – artist co-ordination
- Benjamin Niles – art direction, design
- Charles Pettaway – bass guitar, guitar
- Dale Ramsey – mixing
- Dale "Rambro" Ramsey – mixing
- Daniel Romero – mixing
- T.I. – executive producer
- Guion Thomas – assistant engineer
- Ryan Katz – producer
- Carlos Thornton – producer
- Benny Tillman – producer
- Kanye West – producer
- Howard White – assistant engineer
- Cory Williams – engineer, mixing assistant
- Crystal Williams – mixing assistant
- Mike "Hitman" Wilson – engineer
- Michael Witwer – guitar

== Charts ==
=== Weekly charts ===
Weekly chart performance for Trap Muzik
| Chart (2003) | Peak position |
|---|---|
| US Billboard 200 | 4 |
| US Top R&B/Hip-Hop Albums (Billboard) | 2 |

=== Year-end charts ===
2003 year-end chart performance for Trap Muzik
| Chart (2003) | Position |
|---|---|
| US Billboard 200 | 195 |
| US Top R&B/Hip-Hop Albums (Billboard) | 49 |

2004 year-end chart performance for Trap Muzik
| Chart (2004) | Position |
|---|---|
| US Billboard 200 | 153 |
| US Top R&B/Hip-Hop Albums (Billboard) | 29 |

== Certifications ==
Certifications for Trap Muzik
| Region | Certification | Certified units/sales |
|---|---|---|
| United States (RIAA) | Platinum | 1,000,000^{^} |
^{^} Shipments figures based on certification alone.
