= Rubber Band Man =

Single by T.I.

from the album Trap Muzik
- Released: December 30, 2003
- Recorded: 2003
- Studio: Patchwerk Recordings, Atlanta, Georgia
- Genre: Southern hip-hop; gangsta rap
- Length: 5:48 (album version); 4:35 (clean version); 3:58 (video version)
- Label: Grand Hustle; Atlantic
- Songwriters: Clifford Harris; Lavell Crump
- Producer: David Banner

T.I. singles chronology
"Round Here" (2003)	"Rubber Band Man" (2003)	"Let's Get Away" (2004)

"Rubber Band Man" is a song by American rapper T.I., released December 30, 2003 as the third single from his second studio album Trap Muzik (2003). Production from David Banner was noted by music reviewers, particularly the ascending organ riff that has been described as 'hypnotic' and 'pure halftime show'. Upon release, it charted reasonably well, peaking at number 30 on the US Billboard Hot 100, becoming T.I.'s first top 40 charting single. The song is included in the hits collections Totally Hits 2004, Crunk Hits Volume 1, and Hip Hop Hits Volume 9. It was listed at number 34, on Complex Magazine's "Best Atlanta Rap Songs of all Time" and number 61, on their "Best Songs of the Decade."

== Background ==
T.I. says the song's title is a reference to his habit of wearing rubber bands around his wrist, a habit that dates back to when he was a drug dealer. There is also a previous song by soul group The Spinners with the same title which was made before T.I. was even born. The rubber bands were used to hold large sums of money together because they wouldn't fit into a normal pocket wallet. Publicity efforts for the single were derailed by T.I.'s arrest in August 2003. At the end of the song, there is a skit advertisement for "buster card" and the number is reversed, so if you play that skit in reverse, the number is 404-349-5000, which is the number for a Subway Restaurant in Atlanta, Georgia.

== Music video ==
The song's music video was directed by Darren Grant. David Banner, Lil Duval, Michael Vick, Usher, Bow Wow, Jagged Edge, Steve Rudolph, Atlanta-based comedian Shawty, YoungBloodZ, Big Gipp, P. Diddy and Jazze Pha, all make cameo appearances in the video. The video also features several prominent shots of suburban Atlanta, including Bankhead courts and College Park.

== Remix ==
The song was officially remixed and released in 2004, featuring verses from fellow American rappers Mack 10, Trick Daddy and Twista.

== Charts ==
=== Weekly charts ===
Chart (2004)	Peak position
US Billboard Hot 100	30
US Hot R&B/Hip-Hop Songs (Billboard)	15
US Hot Rap Songs (Billboard)	11
US Rhythmic Airplay (Billboard)	21

=== Year-end charts ===
Chart (2004)	Position
US Hot R&B/Hip-Hop Singles & Tracks (Billboard)	45
US Rhythmic Top 40 (Billboard)	91
