= I Wish You Would =

I Wish You Would may refer to:

- "I Wish You Would" (Billy Boy Arnold song)
- "I Wish You Would" (DJ Khaled song)
- "I Wish You Would" (Taylor Swift song)
- "I Wish You Would, a song by Train from their album Drops of Jupiter
- I Wish You Would (album), a 1979 one-off recording project of John Wetton, Richard Palmer-James, John Hutcheson, and Curt Cress
- "I Wish You Would", a song by Dutch DJ and producer Martijn ten Velden.

== See also ==
- "Wish You Would", a song by Ludacris
