= Smile Bitch =

Single by Lil Duval featuring Snoop Dogg and Ball Greezy
- Released: July 3, 2018
- Recorded: 2018
- Genre: Hip hop; G-funk
- Length: 3:34
- Label: Rich Broke Entertainment; Empire Distribution
- Songwriters: Calvin Broadus; Roland Powell; Kinta Cox; Mitchelle’l
- Producer: Mr. Hanky

Lil Duval singles chronology
"Wat Dat Mouf Do" (2014)	"Smile Bitch" (2018)	"Pull Up" (2019)

Snoop Dogg singles chronology
"Hollywood" (2018)	"Smile (Living My Best Life)" (2018)	"Top of the World" (2018)

"Smile Bitch" (also known as "Smile (Living My Best Life)") is a song by American stand-up comedian Lil Duval, featuring guest vocals by American rappers Snoop Dogg and Ball Greezy, and co-written by Mitchelle’l. It contains a sample of "Curious" by Midnight Star.

== Commercial performance ==
The song debuted at number 83 on the US Billboard Hot 100. Smile serves as both Lil Duval's and Ball Greezy's first Hot 100 entry, Snoop Dogg makes his 41st career visit and adds his first new title since his featured on Kendrick Lamar's "Institutionalized", in April 2015. The single peaked at number 56 on the chart. Smile reached number one on the US R&B/Hip-Hop Airplay, marking Lil Duval's and Ball Greezy's first number-one, and Snoop's second.

== Charts ==
=== Weekly charts ===
Chart (2018)	Peak position
New Zealand Hot Singles (RMNZ)	39
US Billboard Hot 100	56
US Hot R&B/Hip-Hop Songs (Billboard)	1
US Rhythmic Airplay (Billboard)	4

=== Year-end charts ===
Chart (2018)	Position
US Hot R&B/Hip-Hop Songs (Billboard)	90
US Rhythmic (Billboard)	41

== Certifications ==
Region	Certification	Certified units/sales
United States (RIAA)	Platinum	1,000,000^{‡}
^{‡} Sales+streaming figures based on certification alone.
