= A.K.O.O. Clothing =

American clothing brand

- Industry: Apparel
- Founded: 2008
- Headquarters: United States
- Key people: T.I. (Co-Founder); Jason Geter (Co-Founder)
- Products: Clothing, fashion bags, and accessories
- Website: http://www.akoo.com/

A.K.O.O. is a clothing line started in late 2008 and founded by T.I. and Jason Geter, both co-founders of Atlanta-based hip hop recording label Grand Hustle Records. A.K.O.O. is an acronym that stands for "A King Of Oneself."

== Distribution ==
A.K.O.O Clothing is produced and distributed by the RP55 Group based in Virginia Beach, Virginia. Products are sold in numerous stores across the Continental United States and Hawaii. AKOO Clothing items are also distributed nationally and internationally through many different online vendors.

== Products and brand direction ==
A.K.O.O. Clothing is an Americana fashion brand that manufactures urban apparel for men. A.K.O.O. produces a wide array of styles for all seasons that include premium lightweight T-shirts, cardigans, sweaters, embroidered wovens, leather jackets, and quality denim, among a variety of other clothing. In 2010, T.I. discussed his vision for the brand with MTV. "The direction of the clothing line, in my eyes, is upscale urban apparel," he stated. T.I. also mentioned in the same MTV interview that A.K.O.O will develop denim that is made from high-quality fabrics. The line also sells wovens, crew-necks, and V-neck t-shirts. A diverse range of people have worn A.K.O.O apparel including hip-hop star Big Boi. Some prominent fans have even taken it a step further by aligning themselves and their projects with A.K.O.O. such as Hosea Chanchez B.o.B, Curtis Granderson, Carl Crawford, Travis Porter, Tristan Wilds, Meek Mill and Mickey Factz.

In the summer of 2011 B.o.B was announced the new face of T.I.'s clothing line A.K.O.O. He will be featured in AKOO Clothing's upcoming fall 2011 national advertising campaign alongside Curtis Granderson of the New York Yankees, Carl Crawford of the Los Angeles Dodgers, and star of the BET hit sitcom, The Game, Hosea Chanchez. He will be appearing in a graphic novel for A.K.O.O. titled Hide In Plain Sight – Saving the World From Fashion Conspiracy.

== Lawsuit and controversy ==
After the launch of the clothing line, A.K.O.O. faced a lawsuit from Akoo International, a social Music TV Network established years before the clothing line, for trademark infringement. The world's largest online social music television site had been using the trademarked name since 2004 and thought the infringement would mislead, confuse and deceive potential customers and clients.

In March 2010, numerous calls were made to the CBS Outdoor office complaining that the A.K.O.O. billboard in Newark, New Jersey, was too sexually suggestive. The billboard depicted a man having his jeans pulled down by a woman who was squatting in front of him. Owing to the excessive number of complaints, the billboard was later removed from its prominent position in Newark.
