= The Grand Hustle =

American reality game show

- Genre: Reality Competition
- Created by: T.I.
- Country of origin: United States
- Original language: English
- No. of seasons: 1
- No. of episodes: 12

Production
- Executive producers: T.I. Brian Sher; Christian Sarabia; Vinnie Kaufman; Johnny Petillo
- Production locations: Atlanta, GA
- Running time: 41 min
- Production company: 51 Minds Entertainment

Original release
- Network: BET
- Release: July 20 – October 4, 2018

The Grand Hustle is an American reality competition. The show features a group of sixteen men and women who compete for a six-figure salary position working under Clifford "T.I." Harris.

Harris serves both as star and as executive producer on the show, along with fellow executive producers Brian Sher, Christian Sarabia, Vinnie Kaufman and Johnny Petillo. Petillo served as a producer on Donald Trump's former reality show The Apprentice, and on Survivor, which explains the show's similarities to both series.

== History ==
The first season consisted of twelve episodes. The series premiered on BET on July 20, 2018.

== Cast ==
- Yonathan Elias
- Krystal Garner
- Ivan Parker
- George Ray III
- Jennifer 'Ms Fer' Russell

Jo'Vonne "Javi Renee" Collier

== Contestants ==
Name	Age	Hometown	Occupation	Eliminated	Notes
Krystal Garner		Staten Island, NY	Event Planner	Winner	
George Ray III		Fort Lauderdale, FL	Business Consultant/Professor	Runner-Up	
Yonathan Elias		New York, NY	International Television Host	Week 11	
Grace-C		Los Angeles, CA	Teacher	Week 11	
Terron Hall		Baltimore, MD	Media Sales Consultant	Week 10	
Blanca "Ciera" Gabbana		Baltimore, MD	Digital Media CEO	Week 9	
Jillian Miller		Chicago, IL	Brand Ambassador	Week 8	
Troy Woolfolk		Austin, TX	Digital Marketing Specialist	Week 8	
Jo'Vonne "Javi" Renee		Deland, FL	Makeup & Fashion Designer	Week 7	
Jonathan Torres		Queens, NY	Salon Owner	Week 6	
Vanessa Blair		New York, NY	Executive Personal Assistant	Week 5	
Christopher			Mobil Theme Park Owner	Week 4	
Ivan Parker		Mobile, AL	Custom Footwear Designer	Week 3	
Nykyta Arnold		Atlanta, GA	Tech Company Account Executive	Week 2	
Brandon Brice		Detroit, MI	Nonprofit Fundraiser	Week 1	
Akeyla Asuncion		Arlington, VA	Marketing Director	Week 1	

== Episodes ==
=== Season 1 ===
Season 1 began on July 20, 2018 and concluded on October 4, 2018.

No.	Title	Air Date
1	"Hustle 101"	July 18, 2018
2	"Pop Up Shop"	July 25, 2018
3	"Failure To Launch"	August 1, 2018
4	"Us or Else"	August 9, 2018
5	"If The Shoe Fits"	August 15, 2018
6	"The Hustle Never Stops"	August 22, 2018
7	"Lights, Camera, Hustle"	August 29, 2018
8	"Casino Night"	September 6, 2018
9	"No Hollywood Ending"	September 13, 2018
10	"Family Values"	September 20, 2018
11	"Assistant For A Day"	September 27, 2018
12	"What Happens In Vegas"	October 4, 2018
