= Grind Mode =

American hip hop group

- Origin: Miami, Florida, U.S.
- Genres: Southern hip-hop; Miami jook; hip-hop
- Works: Discography
- Years active: 2007-present
- Label: Independent

Grind Mode is an American hip-hop and R&B group from Miami, Florida, formed in 2007 by Chaos, Hunger and McKlezie. Known for pioneering the Miami jook movement and releasing the 2008 breakout hit “I’m So High” reaching national charts, peaking No. 50 on the U.S. Billboard Hot R&B/Hip-Hop Songs. The single laid the foundation for the era and introduced the regional South Florida sound to national radio.
