= Let's Get Away =

Single by T.I. featuring Jazze Pha

from the album Trap Muzik
- B-side: "Doin' My Job"
- Released: June 29, 2004 (U.S.)
- Recorded: 2003
- Genre: Southern hip-hop; R&B; Dirty rap
- Length: 4:37
- Label: Grand Hustle; Atlantic
- Songwriters: Clifford Harris Jr.; Aretha Franklin
- Producer: Jazze Pha

T.I. featuring Jazze Pha singles chronology
"Rubber Band Man" (2003)	"Let's Get Away" (2004)	"Bring Em Out" (2004)

"Let's Get Away" is a song by American rapper T.I., released as the fourth and final single from his second studio album, Trap Muzik (2003). The song features vocals and production from American musician Jazze Pha. It peaked at number 35 on the US Billboard Hot 100 chart. The song interpolates Aretha Franklin's 1972 song "Day Dreaming".

== Music video ==
The music video was directed by Darren Grant, while T.I. was sentenced to three years in prison. He was granted rights to film the video for "Let's Get Away" while in prison. Fellow American rappers, Trina and Juvenile, make cameo appearances throughout the video.

== Track listing ==
=== A-side ===
1. "Let's Get Away [Edited]"
2. "Let's Get Away [Explicit]"
3. "Let's Get Away [Instrumental]"

=== B-side ===
1. "Doin' My Job [Edited]"
2. "Doin' My Job [Explicit]"
3. "Doin' My Job [Instrumental]"

== Charts ==
Chart (2004)	Peak position
US Billboard Hot 100	35
US Hot R&B/Hip-Hop Songs (Billboard)	17
US Hot Rap Songs (Billboard)	10
US Rhythmic Airplay (Billboard)	16

== Release history ==
Region	Date	Format(s)	Label(s)	Ref.
United States	May 17, 2004	Urban contemporary radio	Grand Hustle, Atlantic	
