= Be Easy (T.I. song) =

Single by T.I.

from the album Trap Muzik
- Released: October 7, 2003 (U.S.)
- Recorded: 2003
- Genre: Southern hip-hop
- Length: 3:18
- Label: Grand Hustle; Atlantic
- Songwriters: A. Davis; C. Harris; G. St. Clair; T. O' Brien
- Producer: DJ Toomp

T.I. singles chronology
"24's" (2003)	"Be Easy" (2003)	"Round Here" (2003)

"Be Easy" is the second single from American rapper T.I.'s album Trap Muzik. The song is about the life of a man in the projects. The song peaked at number 55 on the US Hot R&B/Hip-Hop Songs chart.

== Background ==
The song samples Al Wilson's "Somebody to Love", which was originally composed by Gary St. Clair and Tim O'Brien.

== Music video ==
The video is about a man who was shot, and left for dead. The video starts off with the man receiving CPR from paramedics. The video then begins and the whole incident begins in reverse, from the man getting CPR to the man leaving his house.

The beginning of the video is where T.I. was "playing" the piano to the beat of the song and appears to be walking and doing everything backwards.

The second portion of the video "Look What I Got" contained cameo appearances such as Eightball & MJG, Killer Mike, P$C & CeeLo Green. The scene appears to be a parking lot with a crowd of people.

== Track listing ==
=== A-side ===
1. Amended
2. Instrumental

=== B-side ===
1. Explicit
2. Amended a cappella

== Charts ==
=== Weekly charts ===
Chart (2003)	Peak position
US Hot R&B/Hip-Hop Songs (Billboard)	55
