= Ice Billion Berg =

- Also known as: Ice Berg
- Born: Teiron Robinson; March 2, 1989 (age 37); Miami, Florida U.S.
- Genres: Hip hop; trap; Southern hip-hop; Miami Jook
- Occupations: Rapper; songwriter
- Years active: 2003–present
- Label: Live House Music Group

Teiron L. Robinson (born March 2, 1989), better known by his stage name Ice Billion Berg or simply Ice Berg, is an American rapper from Miami, Florida. He broke out in the late 2000s with his signature Miami jook style through popular tracks and street hits like “Stick Drill” (and the Stick Drill Freestyle) as well as “Closer 2 My Dreams Freestyle”, one of his most viral breakout videos. He is noted as a pioneer of Florida hip-hop scene with his fusing of elements of Miami jook music.

Ice Billion Berg’s biggest hit is “I Get so High” which stands as his most streamed and viewed track with over 2.2 million streams.

== Career ==
Rapper Ice Billion berg got his start during his teenage years as a member of Trick Daddy's Dunk Ryders Crew.
