= I'm Serious =

Studio album by T.I.
- Released: October 9, 2001
- Recorded: 1999–2001
- Genres: Southern hip hop; gangsta rap
- Length: 71:06
- Labels: Arista; Ghet-O-Vision
- Producers: Clifford "T.I." Harris (also exec.); DJ Toomp; Craig Love; Maseo; Brian Kidd; The Neptunes; Jazze Pha; Yung D; Lil Jon

T.I. chronology
I'm Serious (2001)	Trap Muzik (2003)

Singles from I’m Serious
- 1. "I’m Serious" Released: June 26, 2001

I'm Serious is the debut studio album by American rapper T.I., released on October 9, 2001 by Arista Records and Ghet-O-Vision Entertainment. It remains his only release with the former label.

The album included guest appearances from Pharrell Williams of the Neptunes (who called T.I. "the Jay-Z of the South"), Jazze Pha, Too Short, Bone Crusher, Lil Jon, Mac Boney, Pastor Troy, P$C and YoungBloodZ, while production was handled by DJ Toomp, Craig Love, Maseo, Brian Kidd, The Neptunes, Jazze Pha, Yung D, Lil Jon and T.I. himself.

I'm Serious underperformed commercially, only peaking at number 98 on the U.S. Billboard 200 chart and selling an estimated 14,000 U.S. copies in its first week. Critical responses were mixed; many reviews pointed to the fact that many of the tracks sounded the same, and a few were blatant rip-offs. Other critics commented saying, "T.I. claims to be the king of the South, but fails to show and prove. He does, however, have potential. If his talent ever matches his confidence, he may just be headed for stardom." The album has since sold 200,000 copies.

== Background ==
In 1999, T.I. was discovered by fellow Atlanta native Kawan "KP" Prather—whose company, Ghet-O-Vision, is frequently mentioned on the album. As Ghet-O-Vision was an imprint of Babyface and L.A. Reid's Atlanta-based record label imprint LaFace Records, to which Prather himself was also signed, T.I. was led to sign with the label in preparation for his own debut album. His original stage name was "Tip", a nickname given to him by his paternal great-grandfather, which was shortened to T.I. out of respect for labelmate Q-Tip. Later in 2001, LaFace was collapsed and sold to its parent label and distributor Arista Records, merging the rosters of both labels. According T.I. himself, the buyout made LaFace cease operations in his Atlanta hometown, thus creating a more strenuous commute as the Arista headquarters was located in New York City.

The album was preceded by its title track as its lead single, "I'm Serious". The song was released commercially to radio on June 26, 2001 and failed to enter the Billboard Hot 100, although it found success locally. It was produced by the Neptunes and features Jamaican singer Beenie Man. The label declined to release a second single.

After the album failed to garner much success beyond regional boundaries, T.I. and manager Jason Geter acknowledged their grassroots marketing in Southern United States, and questioned their need to enter a second album cycle with the label. A bargain proposed by T.I. gave Arista two options: arrange a US$2 million joint-venture deal with T.I. or drop him from the label; Arista ultimately chose the latter. T.I. then signed with Atlantic Records within the next two years, through which he released his second studio album, Trap Muzik (2003), as well as each of his subsequent releases until 2014.

== Content ==
As a teenager, T.I. was a drug dealer; such activity is frequently detailed on the album. By age 14, he had been arrested several times.

== Critical reception ==
Professional ratings
Review scores
Source	Rating
AllMusic	2.5/5 stars
Down-South	4/5 stars
HipHopDX	3.5/5 stars
Rhapsody	(favorable)

Upon its release, I'm Serious received positive reviews from most music critics. Some critics, however, pointed to the fact that many of the tracks sounded the same and that a few were blatant rip-offs. AllMusic writer Jon Azpiri wrote "T.I. claims to be the king of the South, but on I'm Serious he fails to show and prove. He does, however, have potential. If his talent ever matches his confidence, he may be headed for stardom." Down-South gave the album a four out of five stars saying "With his solo finally about to drop, this album should be his gateway into the mainstream arena. Overall, this album is all I expected plus more. I don't seen how anyone couldn't like it because it's comprised of so much diversity. So when you see this album on store shelves, be sure to grab it, you won't be disappointed."

HipHopDX wrote "Lyrically, Atlanta-bred T.I. (TIP to kids around the way) isn't far behind a lot of other gifted young cats tryin' to make it in the rap game. But rather than doing stand-up on the mic or seeing how many words he can rhyme with Versaci, this 20-year-old tells wonderfully-detailed stories on I'm Serious about coming up when all the elements try to keep you down. But T.I.'s at his best when he uses his head and not his, well, head. Similarly, I'm Serious gets it done by talking about familiar hip hop topics (gats, girls and makin' green), but doing it in a way that somehow comes off as fresh and original." Rhapsody writer Sam Chennault wrote "The opening salvo from one of Southern hip-hop's most charismatic emcees, I'm Serious is more introspective and less bombastic than T.I.'s subsequent work. "Still Ain't Forgave Myself" and "What Happened" are surprisingly tender, though "Dope Boyz" and the Neptunes-produced "What's Your Name" set the stage for the emergence of T.I.'s playa/pusha persona."

== Commercial performance ==
I'm Serious was released on October 9, 2001 through Arista Records in the United States. In its first week of release, I'm Serious made its debut on the Billboard 200 albums chart at number 98, and it debuted at number 27 on the Top R&B/Hip-Hop Albums chart. The album has sold at least 163,000 copies in the United States.

== Track listing ==
No.	Title	Writer(s)	Producer(s)	Length
1.	"Intro"	Clifford Harris; Aldrin Davis; Charles Pettaway	DJ Toomp; Charles Pettaway (co.)	1:33
2.	"Still Ain't Forgave Myself"	Craig Love; Harris	Craig Love	5:33
3.	"Dope Boyz"	Harris; Davis	DJ Toomp	4:24
4.	"What Happened?"	Harris; Kawan Prather; James Hollins; Maurice Sinclair	P.A.	3:24
5.	"You Ain't Hard" (featuring Mac Boney)	Brian Kidd; Harris; Nathaniel Josey	Brian "BK" Kidd	4:05
6.	"Why I'm Serious" (Interlude)	Harris; Davis; Pettaway	DJ Toomp; Pettaway (co.)	1:03
7.	"I'm Serious" (featuring Beenie Man)	Harris; Pharrell Williams; Chad Hugo	The Neptunes	3:27
8.	"Do It (Stick It Baby)"	Davis; Harris; Prather	DJ Toomp; T.I. (co.)	3:56
9.	"What's Yo Name" (featuring The Neptunes)	Harris; Williams; Hugo	The Neptunes	3:52
10.	"Hands Up"	Kidd; Harris; Prather	Brian "BK" Kidd	4:31
11.	"Chooz U" (featuring Jazze Pha)	Harris; Phalon Alexander; William Hutchinson	Jazze Pha	3:31
12.	"I Can't Be Your Man"	Harris; Kidd	Brian "BK" Kidd	4:39
13.	"Hotel" (featuring Too $hort)	Harris; Prather; Hollins; Sinclair; Todd Shaw	P.A.	5:04
14.	"At the Bar"	Harris; Kidd	Brian "BK" Kidd	3:49
15.	"Heavy Chevys" (featuring P$C)	Davis; Harris; Sean Merret; Douglas Peterson; Josey; Akeem Lawal	DJ Toomp	4:46
16.	"Grand Royal"	Harris	T.I.	5:11
17.	"Outro"	Harris; Davis; Pettaway	DJ Toomp; Pettaway (co.)	2:45
18.	"I'm Serious" (Remix) (featuring YoungBloodZ, Bone Crusher & Pastor Troy)	Harris; Williams; Hugo	The Neptunes; Lil Jon (remixer)	5:33

Sample credits

- "I Chooz U" contains a sample of "I Can Sho' Give You Love" as performed by Willie Hutch.

== Personnel ==
Credits for I'm Serious adapted from Allmusic.

- Beenie Man – performer
- Josh Butler – engineer
- Andrew Coleman – engineer
- Myrna Crenshaw – vocals (background)
- DJ Toomp – producer
- Jay Goin – mixing
- Robert Hannon – mixing
- Troy Hightower – mixing
- Chad Hugo – arranger
- Dave "DasKyz" Hummel – engineer
- James Humphreys – assistant engineer
- Ken Ifill – mixing
- Jazze Pha – performer
- Craig Love – guitar
- Charles Pettaway – producer
- Matt Still – engineer, mixing
- Too Short – performer
- Pharrell Williams – arranger
- Mike "Hitman" Wilson – engineer

== Charts ==
Weekly chart performance for I'm Serious
Chart (2001)	Peak position
US Billboard 200	98
US Top R&B/Hip-Hop Albums (Billboard)	27
