= Wish You Would =

Single by Ludacris featuring T.I.

from the album Theater of the Mind
- Released: September 2, 2008
- Recorded: 2008
- Genre: Hip hop
- Length: 4:47
- Label: Disturbing tha Peace; Def Jam
- Songwriters: Christopher Bridges; Aldrin Davis; Clifford Harris; Ronald Utley
- Producer: DJ Toomp

Ludacris singles chronology
"Still Standing" (2008)	"Wish You Would" (2008)	"Chopped 'n' Skrewed" (2008)

T.I. singles chronology
"What Up, What's Haapnin'" (2008)	"Wish You Would" (2008)	"Swagga Like Us" (2008)

"Wish You Would" is a song by American hip hop recording artist Ludacris, released September 2, 2008 as the second single from his sixth studio album Theater of the Mind (2008). The song, produced by DJ Toomp, features Ludacris' former rival, fellow Atlanta rapper T.I. At the 2009 Grammy Awards, the song was nominated for an award in the category of Best Rap Performance by a Duo or Group. The song ultimately lost to T.I.'s respective single, "Swagga Like Us".

In October 2008, American hip hop production duo Play-N-Skillz composed a remix, giving it one of their own productions.

== Background ==
After the song was leaked, MTV interviewed both Ludacris and T.I., who were involved in a high-profile dispute for several years. Ludacris said, "I felt like there was no bigger event in hip-hop at this moment than me and T.I. working together." T.I. said, "We had figure if it ain't no problem and we don't have no issues, no beef, then there's no reason we shouldn't be able to get together and make music." Artists from both Disturbing tha Peace and Grand Hustle were as surprised as anyone else. T.I. and Ludacris also collaborated on T.I.'s 2008 studio album Paper Trail, on the song "On Top of the World", also featuring B.o.B.

== Chart positions ==
Chart (2008)	Peak Position
U.S. Billboard Bubbling Under Hot 100 Singles	14
U.S. Billboard Bubbling Under R&B/Hip-Hop Singles	18
