= Miami jook =

Uptempo hip-hop subgenre

Miami Jook
- Other names: South Dade Jook, Jook Music, Jookin’
- Stylistic origins: Southern hip-hop; Miami bass
- Cultural origins: Early 2000s–Mid 2000s, Miami, Florida, United States
- Derivative forms: Electro music; Electronic dance music

Fusion genres
- Miami bass

Miami jook (originally named South Dade jook) is an uptempo hip-hop subgenre and fast-paced street dance tradition that originated in Miami, Florida during the early 2000s and peaked around 2006-2009. Infleucend by the Miami bass from the 1980s, features high tempos typically ranging from 120 to 135 beats per minute (BPM). It became a prominent regional music genre and dance culture in South Florida. It was pioneered by Gorilla Tek, DJ Chipman, Grind Mode, Ice Billion Berg and Deslos Piccalo. Subsequent young rappers and producers pushed for the progression of the style in the late 2000s, bringing it to global attention.

== History ==
=== Origins: 2000–2004 ===
Miami jook emerged in the early 2000s from the underground hip-hop scene, particularly in the South Dade region of Miami-Dade County.At the time Miami’s hip hop scene was heavily street-oriented rap, Miami bass and Southern hip-hop. Jook introduced a different direction: faster, more melodic, dance-oriented music. Producer Tony Castillo played an important role in developing the sound. He incorporated familiar R&B and soul samples into bass-heavy, uptempo hip-hop
