= T.I. =

American rapper (born 1980)

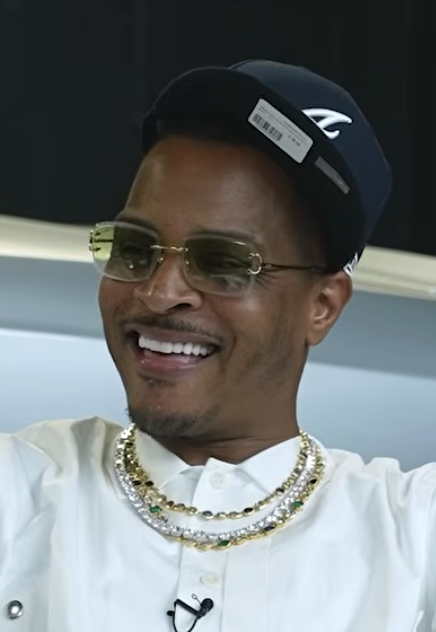
- T.I. in 2026
- Born: Clifford Joseph Harris Jr. September 25, 1980 (age 46); Atlanta, Georgia, U.S.
- Other names: Tip; T.I.P.
- Occupations: Rapper; songwriter; record executive; record producer; actor
- Years active: 1999–present
- Agent: Jason Geter
- Works: Discography; filmography; production; videography
- Title: Co-founder of A.K.O.O. Clothing, Grand Hustle, VisionMob, Club Crucial and V Live
- Spouse: Tameka Cottle (m. 2010)
- Children: 6 including Clifford Joseph Harris III, Heiress Harris
- Awards: Full list
- Musical career
- Genres: Southern hip-hop; trap; gangsta rap
- Labels: Empire; Epic; Grand Hustle; Roc Nation; Columbia; Atlantic (former); LaFace; Arista; Ghet-O-Vision
- Member of: Bankroll Mafia; P$C; Smash Factory; Hustle Gang
- Website: officialti.com

Clifford Joseph Harris Jr. (born September 25, 1980), known professionally as T.I. or Tip, is an American rapper and actor. Born and raised in Atlanta, Georgia, Harris is credited as a pioneer of the hip-hop subgenre trap music, along with fellow Georgia-based rappers Jeezy and Gucci Mane. He met local music executive Kawan "KP" Prather in the late 1990s, joining his company Ghet-O-Vision Entertainment — an imprint of Arista and LaFace Records — by 1999. The lukewarm critical and commercial response of his debut studio album, I'm Serious (2001), led him to part ways the label. He then signed with Atlantic Records and found mainstream success with his subsequent releases, co-founding his record label imprint, Grand Hustle Records, in 2003.

Harris gained recognition following his guest appearance on fellow Atlanta-based rapper Bone Crusher's 2003 single "Never Scared" — his first Billboard Hot 100 entry. His second album, Trap Muzik (2003), peaked at number four on the Billboard 200 chart and spawned the top 40 singles "Rubber Band Man" and "Let's Get Away" (featuring Jazze Pha). The following year, Harris guest appeared alongside Lil Wayne on Destiny's Child's hit single "Soldier", and capitalized on this with the release of his third album, Urban Legend (2004). His next three studio albums each debuted atop the Billboard 200; his fourth and fifth, King (2006) and T.I. vs. T.I.P. (2007), were led by the Billboard Hot 100-top ten singles, "What You Know" and "Big Shit Poppin' (Do It)", respectively.

Harris' sixth album, Paper Trail (2008), yielded his furthest commercial success, receiving gold certification by the Recording Industry Association of America (RIAA) in its first week. It spawned two Billboard Hot 100 number-one singles: "Whatever You Like" and "Live Your Life" (featuring Rihanna); the latter replaced the former atop the chart, and made Harris the first rapper to do so while occupying its top two positions. Following an eleven-month incarceration, his seventh album, No Mercy (2010), witnessed a critical and commercial decline, rebounded by his eighth album, Trouble Man: Heavy Is the Head (2012). Harris also guest appeared alongside Pharrell Williams on Robin Thicke's 2013 single "Blurred Lines", which peaked atop the Billboard Hot 100, and did so in 22 other countries.

The following year, his contract with Atlantic expired; he signed with Columbia Records and enlisted Williams as executive producer for his ninth studio album, Paperwork (2014). As with his previous, it reached number two on the Billboard 200 and saw positive critical reception. The following year, he worked further with album collaborator and then-upcoming hometown native Young Thug to form the short-lived hip-hop collective, Bankroll Mafia. He then signed with Jay-Z's Roc Nation in 2016 to release his political Us or Else (2016–2017) extended play series and compilation album, We Want Smoke (2017); he later signed with Epic Records in 2018 to release his long-delayed tenth album, Dime Trap, in October of that year. His eleventh album, The L.I.B.R.A. (2020) was his first to be released independently. His twelfth and final album, Kill the King, was released in 2026.

Harris, a three-time Grammy Award winner, has been described as a leading figure in hip-hop and Southern hip-hop during the 2000s. He has received 19 nominations for the award, as well as 12 Billboard Music Awards, 3 BET Awards, and 2 American Music Awards. Prominent industry artists have signed to T.I. through his Grand Hustle Records label since its formation, including Travis Scott, B.o.B, and Iggy Azalea. In his acting career, Harris has starred in the films ATL, Takers, Get Hard, Identity Thief, and in the Marvel Cinematic Universe films Ant-Man and its sequel, as well as the reality television series T.I.'s Road to Redemption, T.I. & Tiny: The Family Hustle, and The Grand Hustle. As an author, he has published two novels: Power & Beauty (2011) and Trouble & Triumph (2012). By the end of the decade, Billboard ranked him the 27th best artist of the 2000s.

== Early life ==
Clifford Joseph Harris Jr. was born on September 25, 1980, in Atlanta, Georgia, the son of Clifford "Buddy" Harris Sr. and Violeta Morgan. He was raised by his grandparents in Atlanta's Center Hill neighborhood just off Bankhead Highway and lived in Bankhead. His father lived in New York City, and he often went there to visit. Buddy suffered from Alzheimer's disease and died from the disease in 2002.

Harris began rapping at age eight. His stage name originally came from his childhood nickname "Tip", after his paternal great-grandfather. He was once known as Rubber Band Man, a reference to the custom of wearing rubber bands around the wrist to denote wealth in terms of drugs or money.

== Music career ==
=== 1996–2000: Career beginnings ===
In 1996, T.I. befriended local rapper Big Kuntry King. Together they sold mixtapes out of the trunk of their car. Kawan "KP" Prather, a record executive, discovered T.I. and then signed him to his record label Ghet-O-Vision Entertainment. Upon signing with Arista Records subsidiary LaFace Records in 1999, he shortened his name from Tip to T.I., out of respect for Arista label-mate Q-Tip. T.I. relays the situation as:

"We were both on Arista and we was trying to release my first album. The people who had to market, promote, and, you know, just spread the word on it communicated that it was somewhat difficult or confusing to have two Tips in one building. So out of respect and just the legendary reputation and career that preceded that situation, I definitely conceded. My problem, or conflict, at the time, was now this is what I've been called all my life, what do I change my name to? So, I guess, that began to hold my project up. 'What are we gonna call him?' You know what I'm saying? So at that point we had to come to some sort of a resolution. And KP, who signed me to LaFace, he just said, 'OK, look man, how about T.I.?' Cause on this one record I had, it was like, 'T-I-P.' I was like, 'Wait a minute, wait a minute. No. That was — you left out a letter still!' You know what I'm saying? He was like, "Well, listen man. You got something better?', 'No, I don't have — I don't have anything better.' 'Well, that's what we going with, man.' So it's kinda how it came about."

=== 2001–2002: Atlantic Records deal and I'm Serious ===
T.I. released his debut album, I'm Serious, in October 2001 through Arista Records. The album spawned the single of the same name featuring Jamaican reggae artist Beenie Man on June 26, 2001. The single received little airplay and failed to chart. The album features guest appearances from his Southern hip-hop group P$C, Jazze Pha, Too Short, Bone Crusher, Lil Jon, Pastor Troy and YoungBloodZ, as well as Pharrell Williams of American record production team The Neptunes, who called him "the Jay-Z of the South".

The production for I'm Serious, was handled by The Neptunes, DJ Toomp, Madvac and The Grand Hustle Team. Despite the album's guests appearances and production team, the album peaked at number 98 and only sold 163,000 copies in the United States. Critics pointed to the fact that many of the tracks sounded the same and that a few were blatant rip-offs. Other critics commented saying, "T.I. claims to be the king of the South, but fails to show and prove. He does, however, have potential. If his talent ever matches his confidence, he may be headed for stardom."

Due to the poor commercial reception of the album, T.I. was dropped from Arista Records. He then formed Grand Hustle Entertainment and began releasing several mixtapes with the assistance of DJ Drama. He resurfaced in mid-2003, appearing on fellow Atlanta-based rapper and former label-mate Bone Crusher's hit single, "Never Scared". His mixtapes and mainstream exposure from "Never Scared", eventually recaptured major label attention and T.I. signed a joint venture deal with Atlantic Records.

=== 2003–2004: Trap Muzik and Urban Legend ===
T.I. released his second album Trap Muzik on August 19, 2003, through Grand Hustle Records. It debuted at number four and sold 109,000 copies in its first week. It spawned the singles "24s", "Be Easy", "Rubberband Man" and "Let's Get Away". The album features guest appearances from 8Ball & MJG, Jazze Pha, Bun B and Mac Boney. It was produced by Jazze Pha, Kanye West, David Banner, Madvac and DJ Toomp. Upon its release, Trap Muzik received generally favorable reviews from most music critics, who generally regarded it as a major improvement over his debut album, I'm Serious. This included Complex naming the album one of the classic albums of the last decade in 2012. In February 2013, allhiphop.com placed it as No. 5 as the best southern hip-hop album of all time.

T.I. released his third studio album, Urban Legend, in November 2004. It debuted at number seven on the US Billboard 200, selling 193,000 copies in its first week. The album's lead single, "Bring Em Out", which was produced by Swizz Beatz, was released in January 2005 and became T.I.'s first top ten hit, peaking at number nine on the US Billboard Hot 100. The second single "U Don't Know Me" peaked at number twenty-three on the US Billboard Hot 100. His third single "ASAP" reached number 75 on the US charts, number 18 on the US R&B/Hip-Hop charts and number 14 on the Rap chart. T.I. filmed a dual music video for "ASAP" and "Motivation". "Motivation" only made it to number 62 on the US R&B/Hip-Hop singles chart. In 2004, T.I. was featured on Destiny's Child's hit single "Soldier", alongside New Orleans-bred rapper Lil Wayne, which peaked at number three on the Hot 100 chart.

=== 2005–2006: P$C album, King and ATL ===
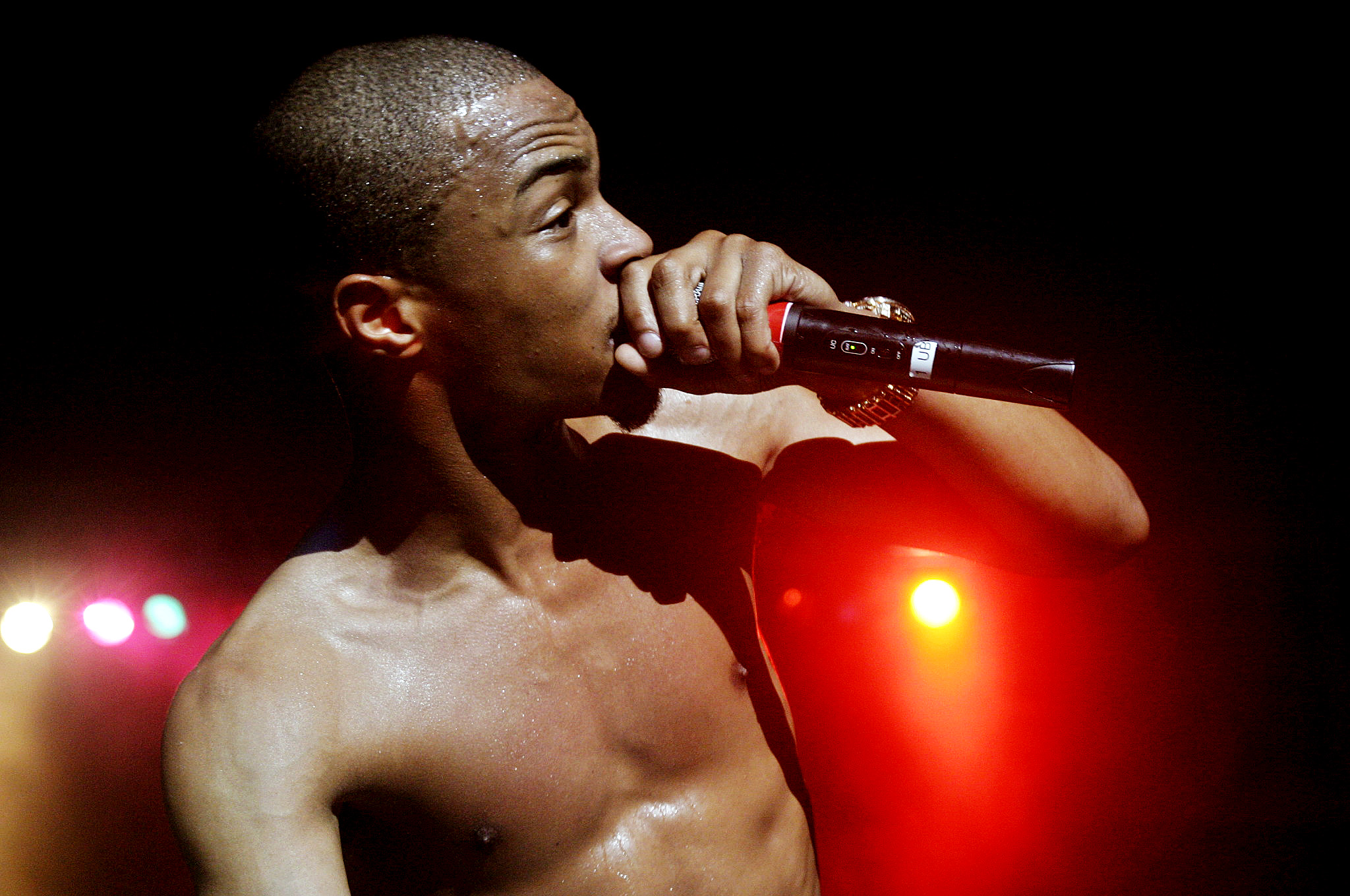
T.I. at the Summer Jam concert in Pittsburgh, Pennsylvania on July 23, 2006.

In September 2005, T.I. teamed up with his Pimp $quad Click (P$C) cohorts, Big Kuntry King, Mac Boney, C-Rod and AK, to release P$C's debut studio album, 25 to Life. The album, which was preceded by several self-released mixtapes by P$C, peaked at No. 10 on the US Billboard 200 chart. The album was supported by the lead single "I'm a King", which was included on the soundtrack to the film Hustle & Flow, a collection released by T.I.'s label imprint Grand Hustle, under the aegis of Atlantic Records.

T.I.'s fourth album, King, debuted at number one on the Billboard 200 chart in the first half of 2006, selling 522,000 copies in its first week. T.I. released "Front Back" and "Ride with Me" as promotional singles prior to the release of the album. The singles garnered little attention. The album's lead single "What You Know" became a hit in the U.S. and helped promote not only the album, but also ATL, the film T.I. starred in, that coincided with the album's release. The album also spawned the singles, "Why You Wanna", "Live in the Sky", and a remix of "Top Back", which was included on the Grand Hustle compilation album Grand Hustle Presents: In da Streetz Volume 4. King earned numerous awards and nominations including a Grammy Award nomination for Best Rap Album. He was featured on newly signed Grand Hustle artist Young Dro's debut single "Shoulder Lean", which reached the top ten on the U.S. Hot 100 and No. 1 on the U.S. Hot R&B/Hip-Hop Songs and Hot Rap Tracks.

"What You Know" won a Grammy Award for Best Rap Solo Performance and was nominated for Best Rap Song at the 49th Grammy Awards. Also in 2006, T.I. collaborated with Justin Timberlake for "My Love", which proved to be a worldwide hit. It won a Grammy Award for Best Rap/Sung Collaboration with Timberlake at the 49th Annual Grammy Awards, and won Best Male Hip-Hop Artist at the BET Awards for the second straight time. He then served as a featured performer on "We Takin' Over" by DJ Khaled, featuring Akon, Fat Joe, Rick Ross, Birdman and Lil Wayne.

In 2006, T.I. received two Grammy Award nominations for Best Song Collaboration ("Soldier" w/ Destiny's Child & Lil Wayne) and Best Rap Solo Performance for "U Don't Know Me" at the 48th Grammy Awards ceremony. In 2006 he won Rap Artist of the Year, Rap Album Of The Year, Rap Album Artist Of The Year, Rap Song Artist of the Year and Video Clip Artist of the Year on the Billboard Music Award and Best Male Hip-Hop Artist on the BET Awards.

=== 2007: T.I. vs. T.I.P. ===
T.I. released his fifth album, T.I. vs. T.I.P., on July 3, 2007. The lead single from the album was "Big Shit Poppin' (Do It)", which was produced by Mannie Fresh and was released to radio stations on April 17, 2007. The second single, "You Know What It Is" featuring Wyclef Jean, was released June 12, 2007. T.I. vs. T.I.P. sold 468,000 copies in the United States, according to Nielsen SoundScan, and debuted at number one on the Billboard 200 and the Top R&B/Hip-Hop Albums chart. It was T.I.'s second chart-topper in a row: King opened at number one on the Billboard 200 with 522,000 copies in late March 2006.

The album included guest performances from Jay-Z, Busta Rhymes, Wyclef Jean, Nelly, and Eminem, and production by Eminem, Jeff Bass, Mannie Fresh, Grand Hustle, The Runners, Just Blaze, Wyclef Jean and Danja. Absent from this album's production lineup was T.I.'s longtime producer DJ Toomp and The Neptunes. In October 2007, T.I. released his third single, "Hurt", featuring Busta Rhymes and Alfamega.

=== 2008–2009: Paper Trail ===
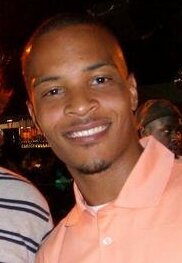
T.I. in 2009.

In early 2008, T.I. collaborated with Mariah Carey on the "I'll Be Lovin' U Long Time" remix, peaking at number 58 on the U.S. Hot 100 and number 36 on the Hot R&B/Hip-Hop Songs.

Whatever You Like (2008)
T.I.'s second single from his sixth studio album Paper Trail.

While under house arrest, T.I. began writing lyrics down on paper for his sixth studio album. The first official single from the album, titled "No Matter What", was released in April 2008. The music video was released in June 2008 on MTV's FN Premieres. The official lead single was "Whatever You Like", released in July 2008, and became the most successful single of his career up until that point, breaking the record for the highest jump to number one on the Billboard Hot 100, jumping from number 71 to number one and becoming T.I.'s first solo number one single on the chart. On YouTube, the video has a combined 333 million views, as of March 2024, split between a copy posted on T.I.'s and Atlantic Records' channels.

The third single was "Swing Ya Rag" which featured vocals and production from Swizz Beatz. T.I. released his sixth album, Paper Trail, in September 2008. The title of the album refers to the lyrics he had written down on paper. Like many other rappers, T.I. abandoned this style of rapping after his debut album I'm Serious by just memorizing lyrics. His representative explained that T.I. wanted to "take more time to really put something down [this time]". The album debuted at number one on the Billboard 200 selling 568,000 copies in the United States.

The second single from the album, "Swagga Like Us", featuring Kanye West, Jay-Z and Lil Wayne, debuted and peaked at number five on the Billboard Hot 100. With the third single "Live Your Life" featuring Rihanna, and produced by Canei Finch and Just Blaze, T.I. broke his own record on the Billboard Hot 100 when it jumped from number 80 to the number one. The fourth single "Dead and Gone", featuring Justin Timberlake, peaked at number two for five weeks on the Billboard Hot 100, eventually going on to be nominated during the 52nd Grammy Awards for both "Best Rap/Sung Collaboration" and "Best Rap Song".

During the 51st Grammy Awards, he was nominated for four Grammy Awards, winning Best Rap Performance by a Duo Or a Group for "Swagga Like Us". "Remember Me", featuring Mary J. Blige, was released digitally on July 7, 2009. It was the planned first single from the re-release of T.I.'s sixth studio album, "Paper Trail", but the re-release was eventually shelved. The single peaked at number 29 on the Billboard Hot 100. On October 6, "Hell of a Life" was released digitally and went on to peak at number 54 on the Billboard Hot 100. In 2009, T.I. appeared as himself on an episode of Kathy Griffin: My Life on the D-List. On the episode, he took the comedian to Roscoe's House of Chicken and Waffles in LA and gave her a lesson on how to "swagger".

On November 21, 2008, T.I. testified in the murder trial of a member of his entourage and a close friend, Philant Johnson (1980–2006), who was murdered in a shooting that occurred after a post-concert party at a club in Cincinnati. T.I. has dedicated several songs to Johnson, from the single version of "Live in the Sky" to "Dead and Gone" where Johnson's grave can be seen in the video.

=== 2010–2011: No Mercy and drug charges ===
On March 26, 2010, T.I. was released from a halfway house where he had been serving the remainder of his prison sentence for weapons possession. Soon after his release he was in the studio working on his seventh studio album titled King Uncaged. Jim Jonsin, the producer who previously worked with him on his single, "Whatever You Like" and R&B singer Trey Songz, were scheduled to work on the project.

T.I. made his first public appearance since prison, stepping out with then fiancée Tameka "Tiny" Cottle in support of her Alzheimer's research fundraiser "For the Love of Our Fathers" at Atlanta's Opera venue. "I am very well, very happy to be seen," said T.I., who joined Cottle onstage at the end of the benefit. T.I. released a new promotional single titled "I'm Back" on March 8, 2010. The single peaked at No. 44 on the Billboard Hot 100 charts. Around this time, he made a featured guest appearance on Diddy-Dirty Money's single "Hello Good Morning", the single peaked at No. 27 in US and charted internationally in eight other countries.

He made a guest appearance on Larry King Live on May 13, to discuss with Larry King about his nine-month prison term on federal gun charges and other topics. T.I. released a promotional soundtrack single entitled, "Yeah Ya Know (Takers)" on May 24. It peaked at number forty-four on the Billboard Hot 100 and number sixty-eight on the Canadian Hot 100. T.I. released another promotional single entitled "Got Your Back" which featured American R&B singer Keri Hilson and peaked at number thirty-eight in the US. Later, T.I. made more featured single appearances such as Jamie Foxx's single "Winner", featuring Justin Timberlake, and Drake's single "Fancy", featuring Swizz Beatz. Both singles charted on the Billboard charts, peaking at the top 50.

Prior to the album's release, T.I. decided to release a mixtape titled Fuck a Mixtape. The move was somewhat controversial due to its title, with many feeling he was insulting the Mixtape format. T.I. has addressed the issue by stating that it was a response to all the people who told him to just focus on an album and not on a mixtape. T.I. further defended his decision to release a mixtape by saying: "I already have 60, 70 songs. A lot of these songs are period pieces that speak volumes to what's going on right now. If I hold onto them next year or the year after, they'll be dated, because my life will be in another direction. If I'm not gonna put it on the album — and they all can't make the album — then they might as well have another platform to present it to the world".

On September 1, T.I. and his wife Tiny were arrested for drug charges. On October 15, 2010, T.I. was sentenced to 11 months in prison for violating the terms of his probation. Following his arrest, T.I. scrapped King Uncaged as the title for his seventh studio album and renamed it No Mercy, due to his new prison sentencing. He then released the lead single from the newly titled album, "Get Back Up" featuring Chris Brown, on the same day that he was sentenced back to prison for violating the terms of his probation. "Get Back Up" peaked at number seventy in the US. T.I. began serving his sentence in November 2010 and his date of release was set to be September 29, 2011.

No Mercy was released on December 7, 2010. The album peaked at number four in the US and it sold over 159,000 copies in its first week. RIAA certified No Mercy Gold with over 500,000 copies sold. His second and final single from the album was "That's All She Wrote" his second collaboration with Eminem, and was released on December 19, peaking at number eighteen in the US.

T.I. was nominated for two Grammy Awards for Best Rap Solo Performance for "I'm Back" and Grammy Award for Best Rap Performance by a Duo or Group (Fancy with Drake and Swizz Beatz) at the 53rd Grammy Awards. He was nominated for a Soul Train Music Award for Best Hip Hop Song of the Year, for "Got Your Back" and he earned three BET Hip Hop Awards nominations for Hustler of the Year, Made You Look Award, and Best Club Banger for "Hello Good Morning".

In early June 2011, T.I. said in a letter: "I'll be releasing a record in the near future (couple of weeks tops) to hold y'all over til I get back in action." On June 30, 2011, a new song was released onto T.I.'s official website and on his official YouTube channel – titled "We Don't Get Down Like Y'all", which features fellow Grand Hustle rapper B.o.B on the hook. While commenting on the song, T.I. said in another letter; "It's a song that I did soon after my release last time. What inspired me to write this record was the differences in how we do us and how they do them suddenly became incredibly evident in just a very short period of time." It was originally only available on Atlantic Records's online store. The song was available on iTunes and other vendors, such as Spotify on August 9 and it peaked at No. 78 in the US.

After being released from prison in August 2011, T.I. signed a deal with VH1 for a new reality show that will follow him as he re-adjusts to life as a free man after the incarceration. He announced that he was working on a novel entitled, Power & Beauty, which was set to be released in October 2011.

=== 2011–2013: Trouble Man: Heavy Is the Head ===
On September 30, 2011, T.I. released "I'm Flexin'", the first promotional single from his upcoming eighth studio album. The song features vocals and production from Big K.R.I.T. T.I. reunited with Young Jeezy on "F.A.M.E." for Jeezy's album TM103. "I'm Flexin" peaked at number sixty-six on the Billboard Hot 100, while "F.A.M.E." peaked at number sixty-seven on the Billboard Hip Hop/R&B chart. On October 18, T.I. made appearances on The Howard Stern Show and The View to promote his new novel, Power & Beauty: A Love Story of Life on the Streets and discuss other issues involving his time in prison. Later that day, he released the second promotional single, "Here Ye, Hear Ye" featuring Pharrell Williams under the alias Sk8brd.

After his release from prison, T.I. appeared on several remixes including; "Spend It" by 2 Chainz, "Sleazy" by Kesha, "Niggas in Paris" with Jay-Z and Kanye West, "Hard White (Up in the Club)" by Yelawolf also featuring Slaughterhouse, "Ima Boss" by Meek Mill alongside a freestyle over Drake's "Headlines", and Lil Wayne's "She Will". He was also featured on southern rapper Future's second single "Magic", taken from his debut studio album Pluto, which was the first song he hopped on after his release from prison according to Future.

T.I. revealed the title of his eighth studio album to be Trouble Man. The title was partly inspired by Marvin Gaye's 1972 song of the same name, he revealed on Billboard. In a previous interview with Rolling Stone; he said he was debating between two titles, Trouble Man and Kill the King. The third promotional single "Pyro", was released on November 21.

In preparation for the album, T.I. released a mixtape entitled, Fuck da City Up on New Year's Day. Two songs off the mixtape charted on the Billboard Hot R&B/Hip-Hop Songs, "Popped Off", featuring vocals and production from Dr. Dre and "This Time of Night" featuring Nelly, respectively.

While on set for the "Strange Clouds" music video, MTV interviewed B.o.B and confronted him of a rumor that he and T.I. are working on a collaborative album. B.o.B responded: "The joint album, it actually started as a joke. Tip would always refer to me as 'the Martian', and in one of his lyrics, he said, 'It's the man and the Martian,' and we said, 'Man that could be an album title.' We kinda just played around with it. But it seems to be taking form in a very organic way." On December 1, 2011, B.o.B appeared on New York City's Hot 97 radio station and confirmed that he and T.I. are indeed working on a collaborative album titled The Man and the Martian.

On March 1, 2012, T.I. announced his signing of Iggy Azalea, Chipmunk and Trae Tha Truth to Grand Hustle Records. He served as executive producer for Azalea's debut extended play, Glory (2012), and guest appeared on its lead single "Murda Bizness", which premiered March 26, 2012. On March 30, T.I. released a snippet of "Love This Life", Trouble Man's promotional single, produced by Mars of 1500 or Nothin'. The song was released on April 2, and peaked at number 81 on the Billboard Hot 100.

T.I. guest appeared on Jamaican singer Sean Kingston's 2012 single "Back 2 Life (Live It Up)". The song sampled Soul II Soul's 1989 hit "Back to Life (However Do You Want Me)". The song peaked at number 52 on the Canadian Hot 100. During his visit to Angie Martinez's radio show, he revealed that the album will be released on September 4. He recorded collaborations with Trey Songz and Usher. "It's just a dope, dope collabo". "Usher and Tip, two Atlanta natives," Rico Love told Rap-Up.com. "This time I finally feel like they got a record that's gonna be a humongous hit." T.I.'s VH1 reality show T.I. and Tiny: The Family Hustle was renewed for a second season, which aired on September 3. T.I. released another promotional song off Trouble Man on May 15, entitled "Like That". T.I. appeared on Trey Songz's second single off his album Chapter V titled "2 Reasons". The song peaked at number forty-three in the US. Another promotional single off Trouble Man, entitled "Go Get It" was released on July 17. The song peaked at number seventy-seven and number eighty-six in Canada.

In September, T.I. appeared on 106 & Park to promote his book "Trouble & Triumph", a sequel to his previous novel "Power & Beauty". During his visit, he announced a new release date for his album set for December 18. He revealed that the album will feature collaborations from Pharrell, André 3000, CeeLo Green, R. Kelly, Lil Wayne, and ASAP Rocky. He also stated that he's working on a women's clothing line from A.K.O.O. He later released a new song "Trap Back Jumpin'", which he premiered during his visit on Angie Martinez's radio show. On October 9, 2012, T.I. was featured on the annual BET Hip Hop Awards cypher, alongside his Grand Hustle artists Iggy Azalea, B.o.B, Chip and Trae tha Truth.

A song titled "Ball" was released on October 16 as the lead single from his upcoming eighth studio album. The song featured fellow American rapper Lil Wayne and was produced by American record producer Rico Love, alongside Earl & E. The song peaked at number fifty in the US and number fifty-eight in Canada. On October 23, he previewed twelve tracks from the album at its listening party in New York City, and also revealed their titles. The tracks previewed feature artists such as Kendrick Lamar.

In the following month, T.I. leaked the illustrated cover art from his newly named album entitled, Trouble Man: Heavy is the Head along with the track list and a few newly added features from the album. T.I. explained, "I think it's a lot more urban than Paper Trail, and less apologetic than No Mercy. I think it's more diversified than T.I. vs. T.I.P. though. It's got a lotta heart, it's got a lotta edge. It's a creative album. It's probably harder than most of the shit that's coming out right now." "Sorry" featuring Andre 3000 was released as the fifth promotional single via iTunes on November 27. "Sorry" peaked at number 36 on the Hot R&B/Hip-Hop Songs. Then "Hello" featuring CeeLo Green was released to iTunes on December 11 as the sixth promotional single. The album debuted at number two on the US Billboard 200, with first-week sales of 179,000 copies in the United States. As of September 2, 2013, it has sold 502,000 copies.

Shortly before Trouble Man: Heavy Is the Head was released, T.I. announced he would release the sequel as his next album, titled Trouble Man II: He Who Wears the Crown. The sequel is due to T.I. recording more material than needed, being cited by T.I. as much as 120 songs. In early January 2013, B.o.B announced an upcoming Grand Hustle compilation album titled Hustle Gang. On January 18, 2013, it was announced T.I. drew a close to his 10-year contract with Atlantic records the month before, after releasing Trouble Man: Heavy Is the Head. It was reported he proposed a $75 million deal for any label that wants to provide a home for him and his imprint. TMZ reported that T.I. has drawn up the details, which include "3 albums, 10–20 percent of publishing, touring, merchandise, film and TV rights, corporate endorsement deals, as well as exclusive signing of all Grand Hustle artists". T.I. was also allegedly being coaxed by some of the biggest names in the industry. There were reports that Jay-Z was looking to sign T.I., hoping to add him to the Roc Nation roster. T.I. also had an exclusive dinner at Katana with Dr. Dre, who is thought to have proposed an Interscope signing the rapper. T.I. had also met with Sony, who offered him $50 million, and spoke with Universal later that week.

In February 2013, T.I. revealed he chose "Hello", as the third official single from Trouble Man: Heavy Is the Head. According to T.I., the CeeLo Green-featured song was selected due to its heavy radio play. On March 8, 2013, T.I. told Rap-Up that he was already 60–70% completed with Trouble Man II: He Who Wears the Crown. He also spoke on the Grand Hustle compilation, Hustle Gang, which B.o.B announced earlier in January. In March 2013, T.I. revealed he would soon be filming the music video for "Hello". On March 19, 2013, T.I. performed "Hello" on Jimmy Kimmel Live!. In March, T.I. and B.o.B filmed the music video for "Memories Back Then", a song featuring Kendrick Lamar and Kris Stephens. The song, which was recorded for Trouble Man: Heavy Is the Head, originally sampled "Somebody That I Used to Know", as performed by Gotye. T.I. said to Rap-Up. Although the track failed to appear on Trouble Man, due to sample-clearance issues, it was released as the lead single from the Hustle Gang compilation album.

=== 2013–2016: Post Atlantic and Bankroll Mafia ===
On March 26, 2013, T.I. appeared alongside Pharrell, on Robin Thicke's lead single "Blurred Lines" from his album of the same name. The song quickly became a worldwide hit and peaked at number one on the Billboard Hot 100, making it T.I.'s fourth number one Hot 100 single. The song has also reached number one in 13+ countries, including the United Kingdom and Germany. In March 2013, Lil Wayne announced T.I. would be co-headlining the second America's Most Wanted Tour. T.I. explained that the tour would begin on July 5 and go through September 1, 2013. American rappers French Montana and 2 Chainz, were later confirmed to join the tour, among others. The first America's Most Wanted Tour, had taken place five years prior and featured Young Jeezy, Soulja Boy, Pleasure P, Jeremih and Young Money. On May 21, 2013, T.I. released a single titled "Wit Me" featuring Lil Wayne. The song was released in promotion for the tour and peaked at number 80 on the Hot 100 chart.

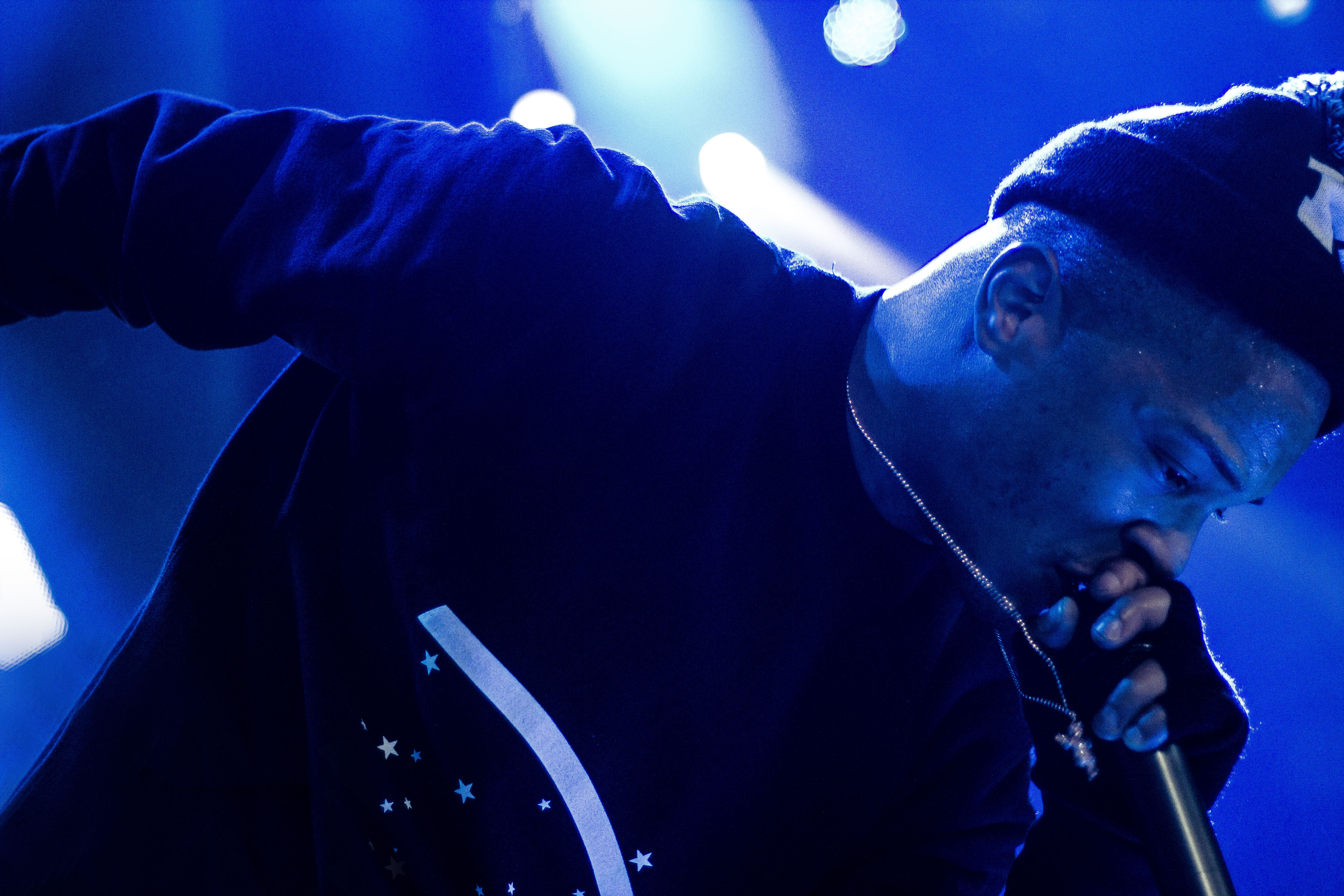
T.I. performing in 2014.

In a July 2013 interview, with Power 98 FM, T.I. spoke on his then-upcoming album, Trouble Man II: He Who Wears the Crown. While he didn't reveal many album specifics, he did promise a project that would make whoever decides to distribute the album very "happy": "I've been working on this one since the last one dropped. I haven't decided exactly where I'm going to take [the new album] yet as far as a company for distribution, but wherever I take it, there's going to be some happy people in that building." In September 2013, T.I. was featured throughout Lil Wayne's twelfth solo mixtape Dedication 5. On September 1, 2013, it was revealed that T.I. would be featured on American pop star Lady Gaga's album ARTPOP, on the song "Jewels n' Drugs", alongside fellow American rappers Too Short and Twista. Another pop star, Britney Spears, later announced T.I. would appear on her song "Tik Tik Boom", from her eighth studio album Britney Jean (2013). T.I. was also featured on British singer Cher Lloyd's single "I Wish", which was released in September 2013.

On November 22, 2013, T.I. announced that he had signed a deal with Columbia Records, to release his upcoming ninth studio album. T.I. later clarified the deal is solely for his ninth album. T.I. revealed he recruited Pharrell Williams, who was influential in his move to Columbia, to executive produce the LP, with plans to release the album in early 2014. In December 2013, T.I. revealed although he had originally planned to release Trouble Man II, since getting into the studio with the album's executive producer, Pharrell Williams, he had a change of heart. He stated: "Since we started working on the project and the project started has taken a different shape, I think we're going to postpone that title. We're gonna rework that. I got a couple of things in mind." He still plans to release the sequel to Trouble Man, however, he said: "All I'ma say is, it's gonna be a motion picture, it's gonna be a theatrical-worthy title. Something that will definitely seem instant classic. I'm thinking something like 'Trap Champion', 'Paperwork,' but whatever it is the subtitle will be 'The Motion Picture'." On December 16, 2013, it was reported that T.I. decided to name it Paperwork.

On May 9, 2014, T.I. released a music video for a song titled "Turn It", in promotion for Paperwork. On June 3, 2014, T.I. released a song titled "About the Money", via digital distribution. The song, which serves as the first single from Paperwork, features up-and-coming Atlanta-based rapper Young Thug. The music video for "About the Money", directed by T.I. and Kennedy Rothchild, was released on June 2, 2014. On June 17, 2014, T.I. release the second single from Paperwork, a song titled No Mediocre, which was produced by West Coast hip-hop producer DJ Mustard and features a guest verse from his then protege Iggy Azalea. Since its release "No Mediocre" reached number 33 on the Hot 100 chart and was certified platinum by the RIAA.

On August 20, 2014, one day after speaking out on America in his online treatise about Ferguson, Missouri, in the wake of the fatal police shooting of Michael Brown, T.I. released a new song titled "New National Anthem". The song, which features vocals from American singer-songwriter Skylar Grey, includes socially conscious lyrics centered on racism and injustice. On September 23, 2014, Paperwork was made available for pre-order with "New National Anthem" as the "instant gratification track". Also on September 23, the official audio for "New National Anthem" was released via T.I.'s official Vevo account.

T.I.'s ninth album, Paperwork, was released on October 21, 2014,. Upon its release, the album debuted at number two on the US Billboard 200, with first-week sales of 80,000 copies in the United States. Paperwork received generally positive reviews from music critics. At Metacritic, which assigns a normalized rating out of 100 to reviews from critics, the album received an average score of 69, which indicates "generally favorable reviews", based on ten reviews.

On March 11, 2015, T.I. released a single titled "Project Steps". On March 24, 2015, T.I. announced his tenth album would be titled Trap's Open. In a June 2015 interview, T.I. revealed his tenth studio album was completed and awaiting release. He also announced he was working on a project as part of the hip-hop collective Bankroll Mafia, alongside Shad da God and Young Thug, among others. On June 26, 2015, T.I. released the music video for the single "Project Steps" and announced his tenth album's new title would be The Dime Trap. In July 2015, T.I. revealed The Dime Trap was being mixed and mastered; he also added that "It is a lot more urban, a lot more edgy, a lot more unapologetically ghetto than Paperwork".

In promotion for the album, T.I. unexpectedly released an extended play (EP) titled Da' Nic, on September 11, 2015. The EP contains five songs, including the singles "Project Steps" and "Check, Run It". The five-track project, which includes features from Young Thug and Young Dro, as well as production from Jazz Feezy, Sho Nuff, League of Starz, London on da Track and Mars, was launched independently. It was released through San Francisco's Empire Distribution and T.I.'s King Inc. imprint, marking T.I.'s first ever independent release. During this period, T.I. reverted to his previous pseudonym, Tip.

On September 18, 2015, T.I. announced his departure from Columbia Records. In an interview with HitsDailyDouble.com, he addressed his situation: "Having just exited my deal at Columbia, I was a rogue artist, busting creativity, just waiting to put music in the marketplace, so while I'm sorting out my next situation, I'm blessed enough to be able to control my destiny and put music out as quickly as I want to, and was able to release a Tip album, which I had wanted to do for a long time."

In October 2015, in an interview with MTV News, T.I. said: "This is a perfect time to be able to call myself what I've always been known as [Tip]. Being called T.I. is very weird. It's kinda awkward to be famous for a name that you've never been called before in your life. If you want me to know that you don't know me, call me T.I. It's the weirdest most awkward thing." During the interview he also spoke on the benefit of not having to deal with a major label and how he couldn't have released Da' Nic if he wasn't independent.

On February 22, 2016, before his "pop-up performance" at Greenbriar Mall in his hometown of Atlanta, T.I. announced he signed a distribution deal with Jay Z's Roc Nation for The Dime Trap. T.I. also revealed he is one of the new co-owners of online streaming service, TIDAL.

T.I., in collaboration with a number of southern rappers, who are collectively known as Bankroll Mafia, released an eponymous album on April 22, 2016. On May 16, 2016, T.I. released a single titled "Dope" which was produced by West Coast hip-hop record producer Dr. Dre. On May 26, 2016, four people were shot before T.I. took the stage at Irving Plaza at his scheduled concert in New York City. One of the victims died later at a hospital. In early July 2016, T.I. reiterated that he would like to be known as Tip, moving forward in his career: "We made a conscious decision to have a lot more faith in the [label] operations of our art early on. But right now, just to be able to [go by Tip] and have it be significant and have people still care about the music being released, it's incredibly flattering. I'm humbled, I appreciate all the love."

=== 2016–2019: Us or Else and Dime Trap ===
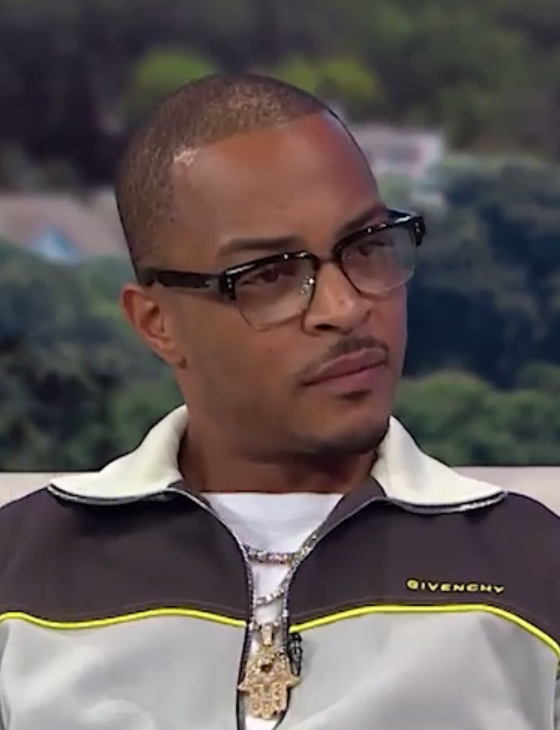
T.I. in a 2019 interview

On July 22, 2016, during an interview with Ebro in the Morning on Hot 97, T.I. announced an EP titled Us or Else. The EP "will be aimed at supporting the #BlackLivesMatter movement, and will speak explicitly about the twisted road race relations took in America to arrive at its current precarious state." On August 6, 2016, T.I. released the first single for Us or Else, a song titled "We Will Not", in response to the turmoil caused by the injustices going on in America, namely police brutality following the deaths of Philando Castile and Alton Sterling. On August 31, 2016, T.I. released a new song off Us or Else, titled "War Zone", exclusively through TIDAL. Us or Else was released exclusively through TIDAL on September 23, 2016, by Grand Hustle Records and Roc Nation. The EP, which was T.I.s first project under Roc Nation, reached number 175 on the US Billboard 200 chart.

On December 16, 2016, without prior announcement or promotion, T.I. released Us or Else: Letter to the System. The project, which was also initially released exclusively through TIDAL, features guest appearances from Quavo, Meek Mill, RaRa, Big K.R.I.T. and Killer Mike, as well as production handled by Nottz, Mars of 1500 or Nothin' and Mike & Keys, among others. In January 2017, it was announced T.I. would host the fifth annual Global Spin Awards. In an October 2017 interview with HipHopDX, when asked about Grand Hustle Records' upcoming albums, T.I. answered with: "We Want Smoke is out, and then Translee is coming out on November 27, and Booke is October 27, and you can wait until December 18 for mine. Just know that whenever you see The Chief [logo] on the project, it's gonna be absolute pandemonium."

In February 2017, during an interview with The Breakfast Club radio show, T.I. revealed he would retire from making music after three more solo albums: "I'm ready to get the hell outta here, though. I got, like, two, I got, this next album and two, I got three more albums in my head, conceptualized. Once I get them out, I'm done. [Jeezy album?] We're still doing it. … [The next albums?] The next one is more like trap music. It's Trap Muzik 2017. And the one after that, it's gonna be more like a, uh, love as it pertains to a dope boy. And the one after that, that's my final album. It's called Kill the King. The last album is Kill the King. Simply because ever since my first album, I've put the title of 'King of the South' on me and to make yourself the king is to make you a target. And in chess, the object is to kill the king. So Kill the King is the title of my last album. Will they kill him or will he ride into the sunset happily ever after?"

In May 2017, in an interview with XXL, when asked about collaborative albums, T.I. answered "Man, I actually have a few of them. Me and Jeezy, we were supposed been did this a while ago. The project was gonna be called, Dope Boy Academy, and we did like three or four songs, but we just gotta get back in and put it together. We just want to present it correctly. Also, me and [Young] Dro was talking about doing one. I think we was gonna call it Sophisticated Excellence or something like that…something he came up with. Me and B.o.B was supposed to do one called The Man and the Martian. I'm open to all collaborations. Me and Trey Songz were supposed to do one too called The Lady Killers. All those of these projects could very well come into fruition."

=== Since 2020: The L.I.B.R.A. and Kill the King ===
On October 16, 2020, T.I. released his eleventh studio album, The L.I.B.R.A.. The album marked his first not to be released by a major label and peaked at number 18 on the Billboard 200.

On June 9, 2021, T.I. announced on social media that he was working on his next album, Kill the King, which will be his final album. On May 10, 2024, T.I. released a single entitled "LLOGCLAY," with rapper YoungBoy Never Broke Again.

On February 22, 2026, T.I. released a 1-minute preview titled "War", amidst his online feud with rapper 50 Cent. This was followed by the release of two diss tracks targeting 50 Cent, "Right One" and "What Bully", both released in the course of two days.

== Feuds ==
=== Ludacris ===
A dispute with Ludacris started when T.I. saw Disturbing tha Peace rapper I-20's video. In the video, a man wearing a shirt which said "Trap House" was being beaten. T.I. mistook the logo to refer to "Trap Muzik". G-Unit artist Young Buck asked fellow Southern rappers T.I. and Ludacris to appear on his new record on the track "Stomp". T.I. recorded a verse which contained a line that Young Buck considered to be an underhanded snub towards Ludacris: "Me gettin' beat down? / That's ludicrous." Young Buck spoke to Ludacris about the verse, to maintain his neutrality in the controversy. Ludacris then recorded the verse that can be found on the album. T.I's record company wanted Ludacris to change his verse before they sanctioned it but Ludacris refused and T.I. was therefore replaced by The Game on the album version.

On June 24, 2007, at the Sunset Tower Hotel in West Hollywood, California, T.I. was involved in a brawl during a luncheon held by Kevin Liles of Warner Music Group (parent company of T.I.'s label, Atlantic Records) with Ludacris' manager Chaka Zulu. According to witnesses, T.I. punched Zulu in the face and choked him and a brief melee ensued. While accepting the award for Best Hip-Hop Artist at the 2007 BET Awards T.I. apologized for the incident, saying "they say it's a fine line between brilliance and insanity," in an apparent reference to his troublesome alter ego, T.I.P. During the broadcast, cameras showed Ludacris smiling in the audience. The audience stood up and applauded T.I.

The two rappers have since resolved their dispute and have collaborated on two songs, "Wish You Would" on Ludacris' sixth studio album, Theater of the Mind, and "On Top of the World" on T.I.'s sixth studio album, Paper Trail. The original version of the latter featured Kanye West.

=== Lil' Flip ===
While T.I. was incarcerated in 2004, another popular southern rapper, Lil Flip, took issue with him over his "King of the South" claims which launched a much publicized feud. In an October 26, 2004 interview with HipHopDX.com, T.I. said he'd heard comments about Flip's "lyrical ability" for a long time but told music journalist Bayer Mack he didn't speak on it because he "wasn't raised like that". T.I. said he was also upset Lil' Flip waited until his incarceration to criticize him. According to AllHipHop, T.I. and Lil' Flip had an altercation in Lil' Flip's neighborhood, the Cloverland section of Houston. It has been said that T.I. went there to create a DVD exposing Lil' Flip to be a fraud. When T.I. went to Cloverland with his entourage, he was met by Flip and his people. Then it was said a fight broke out with one of the members of Lil Flip's entourage started swinging at T.I. until one of T.I.'s bodyguards started shooting. The same day T.I. went on a Houston, Texas radio station talking about the altercation. He revealed that he had the tape and he was going to release it with an upcoming mixtape, but that did not happen because James Prince stopped him from distributing the tape. It is unknown whether T.I. still has the tape or not. The feud was squashed by Rap-a-Lot's Prince after having them sit down and resolve their feud. The feud was documented by the Houston Press, and extensively in the 2005 rap music doco Beef 3.

=== Shawty Lo ===
In 2008, T.I. was involved in a highly publicized feud with Shawty Lo. The feud was characterized by Shawty Lo's track "Dunn Dunn", and T.I.'s reply in "What Up, What's Haapnin". The song "Dunn Dunn" appears to question T.I.'s roots in Bankhead. The music video for "What Up, What's Haapnin" was shot in Shawty Lo's housing project Bowen Homes, an apparent insult towards Shawty Lo. In an interview, T.I. insisted that his song "No Matter What" was only partially aimed at Shawty Lo.

The feud reached its climax at the November 2008 Dirty Awards where the entourages of both artists clashed during the ceremony, forcing it to be shut down. Two incidents forced police to use pepper-spray and evacuate the audience.

The feud was publicly squashed on March 7, 2009, when Shawty Lo and T.I. appeared on-stage together at Club Crucial in Bankhead, for T.I.'s farewell concert. After this performance, T.I. gave an interview to MTV, in which he stated that the feud with Shawty Lo was exaggerated by the media, and was not a 'beef'.

== Other ventures ==
=== Acting career ===
In 2006, T.I. starred in his first film, ATL, which was loosely based on his life growing up in Atlanta and attending a skating rink called "Cascade". The other cast members included Lauren London, Antwan Patton, Evan Ross, Mykelti Williamson, Jason Weaver and Keith David. ATL, which was written by Tina Gordon Chism and Antwone Fisher, was produced by Timothy M. Bourne, Tionne Watkins and Will Smith, and was directed by Christopher Robinson. T.I. played the character Rashad Swann, an orphaned 17-year-old senior in high school. In its opening weekend, the film grossed a total of $11.5 million, ranking third in the United States box office, and went on to gross $21.2 million. In 2007, T.I. appeared in his second feature-film, the biographical crime film American Gangster, as Stevie Lucas, the nephew of drug kingpin Frank Lucas.

In 2010, T.I. starred in the crime action thriller film Takers as Delonte "Ghost" Rivers. The film, directed by John Luessenhop, was produced by William Packer, Michael Ealy, Tom Lassally, Jason Geter, Gary Gilbert and T.I. himself. The film was released on August 27, 2010, through Grand Hustle Films and Rainforest Films, distributed by Screen Gems. The cast includes Chris Brown, Idris Elba, Matt Dillon, Paul Walker, Hayden Christensen and Zoe Saldaña. Takers debuted at number one at the American box office at $20.5 million in its opening weekend. T.I. starred in the 2013 crime comedy film Identity Thief, appearing as a criminal named Julian, alongside actress Genesis Rodriguez.

In 2015, T.I. starred in Get Hard alongside Will Ferrell and Kevin Hart, and appeared as himself in the Entourage movie. He co-starred in Marvel's film Ant-Man, starring Paul Rudd, and its sequel, Ant-Man and the Wasp (2018). In October 2015, it was reported T.I. signed a talent holding/development deal with Warner Bros. Television.

=== Television career ===
In 2009, T.I. created a reality show, which aired on MTV, titled T.I.'s Road to Redemption. The series, focusing on the 45 days before rapper T.I.'s March sentencing, hoped to encourage teenagers to avoid spending a life of crime by showing seven teenagers that there is another way.

On December 5, 2011, T.I.'s new reality show T.I. & Tiny: The Family Hustle premiered on Vh1, after the first full episodes were leaked onto the internet.

On July 19, 2018 BET premiered a show titled The Grand Hustle featuring T.I. BET described the show as "Grammy-winning recording artist/entrepreneur Tip 'T.I.' Harris is looking to expand his Grand Hustle business empire, so he is on the hunt for a highly skilled executive to join the team. Set in Atlanta, this reality competition series features 16 men and women competing in various challenges for the coveted position, with a six-figure salary, within Tip's multimillion-dollar company, which he built from the ground up. The hopefuls serve up big deals and even bigger doses of drama each week, en route to one being crowned the Grand Hustler."

T.I., alongside Chance the Rapper and Cardi B, appeared as a judge for Netflix's Rhythm + Flow, a 10-part hip-hop talent search that aired in 2019.

=== Music and film producing ===
T.I. has served as an executive producer for several projects other than his own, including New Orleans–based rapper B.G.'s tenth album Too Hood 2 Be Hollywood (2009), Atlanta-based rapper B.o.B's debut album The Adventures of Bobby Ray (2010) and Australian rapper Iggy Azalea's debut EP Glory (2012), among others. In 2005, T.I. executive produced the soundtrack to the film Hustle & Flow, releasing the collection through his record label, Grand Hustle. T.I. has produced several song recordings, including for Mariah Carey, Cassidy, Rick Ross, Maino, B.o.B, Yung Joc, Young Dro and himself.

T.I. served as a ghostwriter and assisting songwriter for several artists, such as Bow Wow, Sean "Diddy" Combs, Dr. Dre, Bun B and Keyshia Cole. In 2009, T.I. formed a record production team called The Smash Factory, composed of T.I., Lil' C and Mars. The Grand Hustle label has signed artists that T.I. has collaborated with, like Azelea and B.o.B., as well as other artists, like Travis Scott.

In 2006, T.I. launched his own film company, Grand Hustle Films. In late 2007, T.I. linked up with Los Angeles–based production company 828 Entertainment, to executive produce a reality show titled Life on Mars, which chronicles the life of young prodigy music producer LaMar "MARS" Edwards, of production team 1500 or Nothin'. T.I. partnered 828 Entertainment with his company Grand Hustle, to produce a slate of both television and film projects.

As of June 2014, T.I. is confirmed as an executive producer for the Oxygen docu-series, Sisterhood of Hip Hop.

=== Community work ===
In addition to helping with Hurricane Katrina relief efforts, T.I. worked with troubled youths at Paulding Detention Center in Atlanta, provided scholarships for single parent families at Boys and Girls Clubs, and headlined the Boost Mobile Rockcorps concert at New York's Radio City Music Hall, which featured such performers as Fat Joe, Slim Thug, and Kanye West, and was held exclusively for community service volunteers. As part of his community service time, T.I. visited a number of middle-grade and high schools in Georgia, where he speaks with the students in an assembly, holding a positive message, while maintaining a philanthropic view about morals and growing up in the same areas as himself.

In June 2005, The Lisa "Left Eye" Lopes Foundation, named for the deceased member of multi-platinum female group TLC, and Atlanta's V-103, honored T.I. with the 2005 Lisa Lopes Award for groundbreaking achievements in music and community service which was court ordered. With this steady list of growing accomplishments T.I. was recognized as the "Jay-Z of the South", according to Pharrell Williams of multi-platinum production team The Neptunes.

T.I.'s nightclub, Club Crucial, hosted a giveaway of 200 bicycles to neighborhood children in the Boys and Girls Club with V-103 announcer Greg Street. Upon being asked his opinion on Obama supporting gay marriage, he responded that people should be free to do what they want to do.

=== Business ventures ===
Forbes Magazine announced its first ever Hip-Hop Cash Kings list in early 2007, listing the top 20 hip-hop earning artists for the previous business year. T.I. was listed on their list four times. As in 2015, the rapper was again included in Forbes' annual list after earning $6 million.

T.I. opened his own nightclub, called Club Crucial, in Bankhead, Atlanta. It is considered one of the most popular clubs in Atlanta and features full entertainment centers with large flat-screen TVs, pool rooms, VIP rooms and food. Celebrities such as Monica, Big Boi, Mike Epps and Shawty Lo have made appearances there. The club hosts weekly events such as Monday night Open Mic Night, Free Fridays, and Celebrity Saturdays, where local hip-hop artists perform their songs at the club.

After the release of his hit single "Top Back", Chevrolet secured an endorsement deal with T.I. earlier in 2007, to promote their line of cars, with a focus on the new Impala. Due to his arrest for federal gun charges, he was on the verge of losing his deal with the company.

T.I. had an endorsement with a social networking website focusing on the hip-hop culture named StreetCred.com. The website was founded in 2007 by investment banker Rocky D. Williform. Celebrities such as Diddy, Lil' Kim and Young Jeezy had accounts on the website. As of 2008, the website was temporarily shut down until further notice.

In 2008, T.I. announced the launch of his clothing company A.K.O.O., an acronym for "A King Of Oneself", focusing on urban apparel such as lightweight T-shirts, cardigans, sweaters, embroidered wovens, leather jackets and quality denim among a variety of other clothing.

In June 2010, T.I. was named Global Creative Consultant of Rémy Martin Cognac. XXL Magazine revealed that the partnership will include collaborative projects and a focus on continuing the philanthropic works of his K.I.N.G. Foundation. He announced on Chelsea Lately, that he would be releasing his own signature brand of the liquor.

T.I. lost his endorsement deal with Axe body spray, following his arrest for drug possession.

In May 2012, T.I. revealed he has invested money in a social marketing app called Yopima.

In February 2016, T.I. announced he joined subscription-based music streaming service TIDAL, as an artist-owner, making him the 19th of his kind, and in company with artists such as J. Cole, Beyoncé, Kanye West, Nicki Minaj, Rihanna, Lil Wayne, Daft Punk, Madonna and of course, Jay Z.

In June 2016, T.I. opened a strip club called V Live, in Atlanta.

== Personal life ==
=== Family ===
In 2001, T.I. began a relationship with Xscape member Tameka "Tiny" Cottle. The couple married on July 30, 2010, in Miami Beach, Florida. Together, they have two sons and one daughter. His daughter from that marriage, Heiress, performs under the name Heiress Harris. In June 2024, Heiress performed at the BET Awards 2024 with collaborator Savannah McConneaughey, who performs under the stage name VanVan. In addition, T.I. has two sons with Lashon Dixon, and a daughter from a relationship with R&B singer Ms. Niko. Through his marriage to Cottle, T.I. has one stepdaughter. In December 2016, Tiny filed for divorce from T.I. The couple have been working on a reconciliation. On February 22, 2019, T.I. lost his older sister, Precious Harris, to a car accident that put her on life support a week earlier.

In November 2019, T.I. was widely criticized after telling the Ladies Like Us podcast that he annually accompanied his 18-year-old daughter Deyjah Harris to have her hymen gynaecologically checked to confirm her virginity, despite the fact that such tests are viewed as unreliable as the hymen can be broken by other causes. Such tests were condemned in 2018 by the World Health Organization (WHO), UN Human Rights and UN Women, as "medically unnecessary, and often times painful, humiliating and traumatic". T.I. initially responded by claiming he was never in the exam room during the procedure, although he later admitted he had been when his daughter was younger. In June 2020, Deyjah addressed the controversy in an episode of T.I. & Tiny: Friends and Family Hustle, saying that the experience was "traumatising", had negatively impacted her relationship with her father and that she wanted to be a better parent than he was. In a 2025 Instagram post celebrating his birthday, his daughter wrote that he had "redefined what fatherhood looks like in this bloodline" and that, because of him, she and her siblings could "start from love instead of lack."

=== Suicide interventions ===
In 2006, T.I. was at the scene of singer Scott Stapp's suicide attempt. Stapp explained on VH1's Big Morning Buzz Live that he had attempted suicide in Miami by jumping off a balcony and T.I. "took care of the situation". Stapp said, "I laid out there for two and a half hours and my guardian angel showed up. He immediately took care of the situation and saved my life." T.I. and Stapp met while recording songs for the Passion of the Christ soundtrack in 2004, and bonded over their shared love of the Alabama Crimson Tide. Stapp stated "I found out later it was the only room left in the hotel and he came in off the street and came out, and as I'm laying on the ledge, blood fell to his feet and he looked up and he had an Alabama hat on. I said, 'roll tide,' and then he looked at me and put two and two together and really saved my life."

On October 13, 2010, T.I. convinced Joshua Starks, a 24-year-old suicidal man in Atlanta, not to jump from a 22-story building. After hearing of the situation on the radio, he drove to the scene at the 400 Colony Square Building and asked police if he could help. T.I. then talked to the man, and convinced him not to jump. Afterwards, T.I. stated "For one, I'm not taking any credit. I didn't do it ... I could've just as well came down there and it could have been resolved in another way. The fact of the matter is that God put me in a position to help, and I can't take any credit for that."

=== Female president comments ===
In October 2015, T.I. received backlash when he was speaking on 2016 presidential candidate Hillary Clinton: "Not to be sexist but, I can't vote for the leader of the free world to be a woman. Just because, every other position that exists, I think a woman could do well. But the president? It's kinda like, I just know that women make rash decisions emotionally – they make very permanent, cemented decisions – and then later, it's kind of like it didn't happen, or they didn't mean for it to happen. And I sure would hate to just set off a nuke. [Other leaders] will not be able to negotiate the right kinds of foreign policy; the world ain't ready yet. I think you might be able to [get] the Loch Ness Monster elected before you could [get a woman]." Following the reaction from social media, T.I. publicly apologized on Twitter.

=== Sexual abuse allegations ===
On January 26, 2021, Sabrina Peterson, who was associated with T.I. and his family, alleged on social media that T.I. put a gun to her head and threatened to kill her in 2009. Following the post, allegations of sexual abuse by Harris and his wife Tiny appeared underneath the post. In January 2021, Harris released a video on Instagram denying the allegations, claiming that all of his sexual encounters had been consensual. As a result of the allegations, production of T.I. & Tiny: Friends & Family Hustle was suspended. In March 2021, Peterson filed a lawsuit against T.I. and his wife Tiny, alleging defamation and invasion of privacy after the couple publicly denied Peterson's claims that T.I. had previously threatened her with a gun and faced allegations of sexual assault. In 2023, an appeals court ruled that five of Peterson's seven claims were frivolous and ordered her to pay more than $96,000 in attorneys' fees to the defendants. In March 2025, a Los Angeles County judge dismissed the case after Peterson failed to comply with court orders requiring payment of the legal fees and failed to prosecute the case. Peterson avoided jail during a related contempt hearing, but the dismissal ended the lawsuit. In December 2024, T.I. filed a federal defamation lawsuit against Peterson, alleging that she had falsely claimed on social media that he was under federal investigation for sex trafficking.

By March 2021, more than 30 women and at least one man accused Harris, his wife Tiny, and their associates of "forced drugging, kidnapping, rape, and intimidation" in at least two states, including California and Georgia, which allegedly occurred since at least 2005. An attorney for the accusers has sent letters to the state attorneys general of California and Georgia asking them to open an investigation. The accusers allege that "prior to or upon immediately entering T&T's home, hotel, or tour bus [they] were coerced by Tiny to ingest drugs or [were] unknowingly administered drugs to impair the victims' ability to consent to subsequent vile sexual acts."

== Legal issues ==
=== 1994–2006: Drugs, weapons and assault ===
==== 1994: First arrest ====
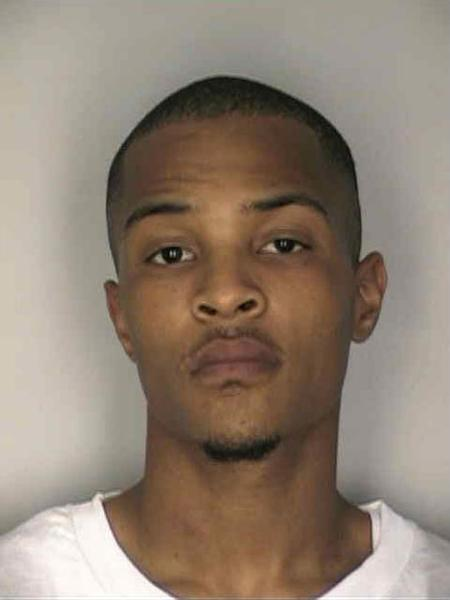
Mug shot of T.I. in September 2003

Harris first began dealing drugs as a teenager, and by the age of 14, he had already been arrested several times.

==== 1997–2004: Felony drug conviction and probation violations ====
In March 2004, a warrant was issued for T.I.'s arrest after he violated his probation of a 1997 drug conviction, as well as a 1998 conviction for violating a state controlled substances act and for giving false information. He was sentenced to three years in prison. While imprisoned in Cobb County, Georgia, he filmed an unauthorized music video. In May 2004, he was released on probation. After being released, he earned a litany of probation violations in several counties around Georgia for offenses ranging from possession of a firearm to possession of marijuana.

==== 2006: Strip club threat and Florida battery of sheriff deputy; community service ====
In 2006, after appearing in an Atlanta court on May 10 and having charges that he threatened a man outside a strip club the previous year dropped for lack of evidence, Harris was arrested on an outstanding probation violation warrant from Florida. The warrant claimed that Harris did not fulfill the required number of community service hours he was sentenced to complete for a 2003 battery of a female sheriff deputy at University Mall in Tampa. Harris was detained by several mall Security Guards at the time of the incident.

According to WSB-TV in Atlanta, the rapper's attorney said that the problem was nothing more than a "technical matter" between Georgia and Florida. The confusion arose because T.I. was also sentenced to community service in Georgia for driving with a suspended license, for which he completed 75 hours of community service in his home state. He was released on bail shortly after being arrested, and was expected to surrender to Florida state authorities the following week to resolve the matter.

=== 2007–2009: Federal weapons conviction ===
On October 13, 2007, federal authorities arrested Harris four hours before the BET Hip Hop Awards in Atlanta. He was charged with two felonies, possession of three unregistered machine guns and two silencers, and possession of firearms by a convicted felon. The arrest was made in the parking lot of a downtown shopping center, which a witness identified as the Walgreens drug store at the corner of North and Piedmont Avenues. Harris was arrested after allegedly trying to purchase the guns from a "cooperating witness" with the Bureau of Alcohol, Tobacco, Firearms and Explosives. According to federal officials, the witness had been cooperating with authorities a few days prior to the arrest, when the cooperating witness was arrested on charges of trying to purchase guns from a federal agent. The witness had been working as Harris' bodyguard since July, authorities said.

On October 26, 2007, Harris walked out of the United States District Court in Atlanta after appearing before U.S. Magistrate Judge Alan J. Baverman and posting a three million dollar bond, two million cash plus equity on his property. Harris was required to remain at home except for medical appointments and court appearances. The only people allowed to live with him were his girlfriend and children. Visitors were required to be approved by the court.

Harris' suppression hearing was scheduled for February 19, 2008. He later pled guilty to U.S. federal weapons charges, and was sentenced to an undefined prison sentence, a year of house arrest and 1,500 hours of community service. In an interview with MTV about serving prison time, Harris said "Presumably, while I'm there, I'll be able to strategize my comeback." He went on to say that he would not "just be sitting still doing nothing". On March 27, 2009, U.S. District Judge Charles A. Pannell Jr. sentenced Harris to one year and one day in prison and ordered him to pay $100,300 in fines. Harris had his sentence reduced from an original maximum ten years and a $250,000 fine with a plea bargain.

On May 26, 2009, Harris began serving his sentence in Forrest City, Arkansas. Two days prior to being imprisoned, he performed a farewell concert at the Philips Arena in Atlanta. Harris was released from FCI Forrest City on December 22, 2009 and transferred to a halfway house in Atlanta. Harris had the Federal Bureau of Prisons ID 59458-019 and was released from CCM Atlanta on March 26, 2010. After his release from prison, he was subjected to an audit of his finances, drug counseling, DNA testing, and random searches of his property.

=== 2010–2011: Probation violation and eleven-month sentence ===
On September 1, 2010, T.I. and his wife Tiny were arrested for drug charges. The arrest for drug charges led to T.I. being sentenced on October 15, 2010, to 11 months in prison for violating the terms of his probation, specifically for possessing ecstasy, testing positive for opiates and associating with a convicted felon, namely his P$C cohort C-Rod. On October 25, the drug charges against T.I. were dropped. On November 1, T.I. reported back to the Forrest City Federal Facility to serve his 11-month sentence. His date of release was set to be September 29, 2011. On August 31, 2011, T.I. was released from Forrest City at 7:29 a.m. and sent to a community living facility to serve out the rest of his 11-month sentence. He then released a statement on Twitter saying: "The storm is over & da sun back out. IT'S OUR TIME TO SHINE SHAWTY!!!!! Welcome to the beginning of our Happy Ending!!!!"

==== 2011: Re-arrest over transportation dispute ====
He was sent back to federal custody on September 1, less than 48 hours after his release, due to a dispute involving T.I. taking a luxury bus from a prison in Arkansas to a halfway house facility in Atlanta. T.I.'s attorney, Steven Sadow, told the Associated Press that the Federal Bureau of Prisons moved T.I. to a different facility and clarified that the dispute was not drug related. T.I. was later released from prison and was sent back to the halfway house, where he was released on September 29, at midnight.

=== 2014: Standoff with Los Angeles police officers ===
On April 30, 2014, T.I. and Compton rapper The Game were involved in a verbally confrontational standoff with officers of the Los Angeles Police Department. According to Billboard, it was believed to have been disconcerted as a response to officers misconducting a group of bystanders afar from a nightclub the two artists were attending. In a video leaked by TMZ, T.I. and Game were forced out of the club which they nicknamed the "Supercut Club", or "Supperclub", by LAPD officials, due to an investigation of a drug and gambling ring. The club's security guards were present at the scene and refused the rappers' re-entries into the property to avoid more legal troubles.

T.I. and Game were forced to stand back, with T.I. yelling "Y'all got a lot of people beat up. We got good lawyers." One of the bystanders was forced to lay down with his hands over his head without warning and security kicked him repeatedly to try to get him back up in opposition. Another guard yelled, "He goes to jail tonight!". T.I. and Game were rumored to have been arrested for simple assault on a police officer and disturbing the peace. They were later released with charges dropped. This was later denied by LAPD team members.

=== 2015: Tax issues ===
In August 2015, the IRS filed liens totaling more than $4.5 million on T.I.'s property for unpaid taxes from 2012 and 2013.

=== 2018: Public disorder arrest ===
On May 16, 2018, Harris was arrested outside of the gated community where he lives, for misdemeanor charges of simple assault, disorderly conduct and public drunkenness in Henry County, Georgia, after a guard allegedly refused to let Harris into the complex without a key. Harris posted bond and was released later that day.

=== 2020: Crypto fraud charges ===
In September 2020, Harris was charged by the SEC for his involvement in two fraudulent initial coin offerings.

=== 2024: Sexual assault lawsuit ===
In January 2024, Harris and his wife were sued for sexual assault. The alleged incident involved them drugging and sexually assaulting a woman in a Los Angeles hotel room in 2005. According to Variety, "The suit describes the plaintiff as being in her early twenties when the assault happened and asserts she was serving in the U.S. Air Force at the time. After allegedly being introduced to the couple by an associate named 'Caviar', whom she had met at the house of the rapper Coolio the night before the assault." In August 2024, the lawsuit was dismissed, due to the statute of limitations expiring.

== Discography ==
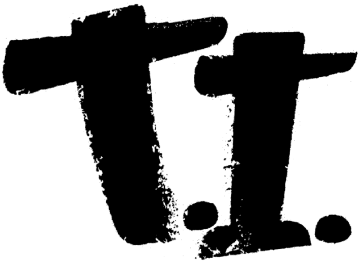
T.I.'s general marketing logo, used since 2004

Studio albums

- I'm Serious (2001)
- Trap Muzik (2003)
- Urban Legend (2004)
- King (2006)
- T.I. vs. T.I.P. (2007)
- Paper Trail (2008)
- No Mercy (2010)
- Trouble Man: Heavy Is the Head (2012)
- Paperwork (2014)
- Dime Trap (2018)
- The L.I.B.R.A. (2020)
- Kill the King (2026)

Collaborative albums

- 25 to Life (with P$C) (2005)
- Bankroll Mafia (with Bankroll Mafia) (2016)

== Filmography ==
=== Film ===
Year	Title	Role	Notes
2006	ATL	Rashad Swann	
2007	American Gangster	Stevie Lucas	
2010	Takers	Ghost	
2013	Identity Thief	Julian	
2015	The Corner Man	Narration	
2015	Get Hard	Russell	
2015	Entourage	Himself	
2015	Ant-Man	Dave	
2016	Popstar: Never Stop Never Stopping	Himself	
2016	Ride Along 2	Tony David	
2017	Sleepless	Sean Cass/Derrick Griffin	
2017	Tom Clancy's Ghost Recon Wildlands: War Within The Cartel	Marcus Johnson	TV movie
2017	Krystal	Willie	
2018	Ant-Man and the Wasp	Dave	
2019	The Trap	Sonny	
2019	Dolemite Is My Name	Walter Crane	
2020	Cut Throat City	Lorenzo 'Cousin' Bass	
2020	Monster Hunter	Link	
2023	Fear	Lou	
2023	Da 'Partments	Da 'Partments (voice)	Executive producer/director
2026	Da 'Partments 2	Da 'Partments (voice)	

=== Television ===
Year	Title	Role	Notes
2003–07	It's Showtime at the Apollo	Himself	Recurring Guest
2005	The O.C.	Himself	Episode: "The Return of the Nana"
2005	Diary	Himself	Episode: "Fat Joe and Friends"
2005	Punk'd	Himself	Episode: "Episode 5.4"
2005–06	Soul Train	Himself	Episode: "Episode 34.23" & "Episode 35.14"
2005–08	Access Granted	Himself	Recurring Guest
2006	House Band	Himself	Episode: "T.I."
2006	Making the Video	Himself	Episode: "Why You Wanna"
2008	Saturday Night Live	Himself	Episode: "John Malkovich/T.I."
2008	Entourage	Himself	Episode: "The All Out Fall Out"
2008	Andrew Young Presents	Himself	Episode: "Walking with Guns"
2009	T.I.'s Road to Redemption	Himself	Main Cast
2009	Kathy Griffin: My Life on the D-List	Himself	Episode: "Kathy at the Apollo"
2009	Behind the Music	Himself	Episode: "T.I."
2009	Connect with the Stars	Himself	Episode: "Episode 1.2"
2010	VH1 Storytellers	Himself	Episode: "T.I."
2011–17	T.I. & Tiny: The Family Hustle	Himself	Main Cast
2012	Boss	Trey	Main Cast: Season 2
2012	Hawaii Five-0	Ray	Episode: "I Ka Wa Mamua"
2012–14	Single Ladies	Luke	Guest: Season 2, Recurring Cast: Season 3
2013	Marked Up	Himself	Episode: "Episode 1.2"
2013	Andrew Young Presents	Himself	Episode: "Walking Without Guns"
2014	Oprah: Where Are They Now?	Himself	Episode: "Meredith Baxter, Rapper T.I. & Downtown Julie Brown"
2014	Amp'd Up	Himself	Episode: "Beat Poetry"
2014	House of Lies	Lukas Frye	Recurring Cast: Season 3
2015	Backstage Diaries	Himself	Episode: "G-Eazy, T.I."
2016	One Shot	Himself/Judge	Episode: "The Atlanta Auditions"
2016	Roots	Cyrus	Episode: "Part 4"
2017	The Timeline	Himself	Episode: "The '91 Falcons"
2017	The Breaks	Paul Anders	Recurring Cast: Season 1
2018	The Grand Hustle	Himself/Host	Main Host
2018–20	T.I. & Tiny: Friends & Family Hustle	Himself	Main Cast
2021	Rhythm + Flow	Himself/Judge	Main Judge
2021	Genius	Ken Cunningham	Recurring Cast: Season 3
2023	The Real Housewives of Atlanta	Himself	Episode: "Art Imitates Life"

=== Video games ===
Year	Title	Role	Notes
2007	Def Jam: Icon	Himself	Voice role and likeness
2017	Tom Clancy's Ghost Recon Wildlands	Marcus Jenssen	Voice role

=== Documentary ===
Year	Title
2005	Beef III

== See also ==
- Pharrell Williams v. Bridgeport Music
- List of artists who reached number one in the United States
- List of artists who reached number one on the U.S. Rhythmic chart
- List of hip-hop musicians
- List of people from Atlanta
- Music of Atlanta
