= DJ Toomp =

American record producer (born 1969)

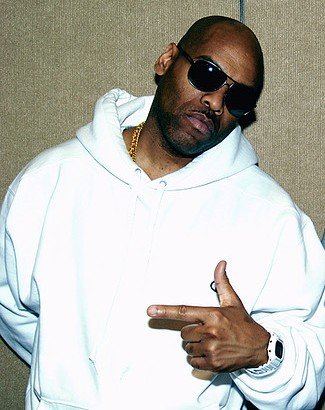
- Davis in March 2008

Background information
- Also known as: Toomp; Zas
- Born: Aldrin Davis; August 2, 1969 (age 57)
- Origin: Atlanta, Georgia, U.S.
- Genre: Southern hip-hop
- Occupations: Record producer; disc jockey; songwriter
- Instruments: Keyboards; turntables; sampler; Roland TR-808; E-mu SP-1200; Akai MPC
- Years active: 1985–present
- Labels: Zone Boy; NZone; Grand Hustle
- Website: www.djtoomp.com

Aldrin Davis (born August 2, 1969), known professionally as DJ Toomp, is an American Grammy Award winning, multi-platinum producer based in Atlanta, Georgia.

DJ Toomp's career began in 1985, when he produced fellow Southern rapper Raheem the Dream's self-titled debut album at the age of 16 years old. In the late 1980s, he moved to Miami and worked in the Miami Bass scene, producing tracks for MC Shy D, an artist signed to Luke Records and touring as his DJ on the road with 2 Live Crew, as they performed at various venues across the country with other hip hop acts such as N.W.A. and Ice-T. Toomp produced MC Shy D's first two albums. After MC Shy-D left Luke Records, Toomp went on to DJ for JT Money and his Poison Clan.

In the early 1990s, when the 2 Live Crew disbanded, Davis teamed up with former group member Mark Ross (Brother Marquis), to form the duo 2 Nasty.

Davis saw greater recognition for his collaborations with Southern rapper T.I.. Davis produced for T.I.'s first four albums—I'm Serious (2001), Trap Muzik (2003), Urban Legend (2004), and King (2006)—as well as the latter's single "What You Know", which peaked at number 3 on the U.S. Billboard Hot 100. The song earned both Davis and T.I. their first Grammy Award.

In 2007, Davis was recruited by rapper and fellow record producer Kanye West, to contribute production on his third album Graduation. Davis and West co-produced the singles "Can't Tell Me Nothing" and "Good Life", as well as the album's outro "Big Brother".

== Career ==
In 1993, 2 Nazty and released the album Indecent Exposure. When discussing the album, Ross explained his intention to showcase diversity while staying true to the style that had made him famous. Greg Baker of Miami New Times praised the album, acknowledging that while some of the content might be offensive, he appreciated its diversity. About the production and rap, Baker commented, "clever story lines and double-dope rhyme schemes are laid over skirt-flipping, ass-bumping beats as strong as any on the hip-hop market today."

In 2006, Davis co-founded the record label NZone Entertainment.
