= Young Dro discography =

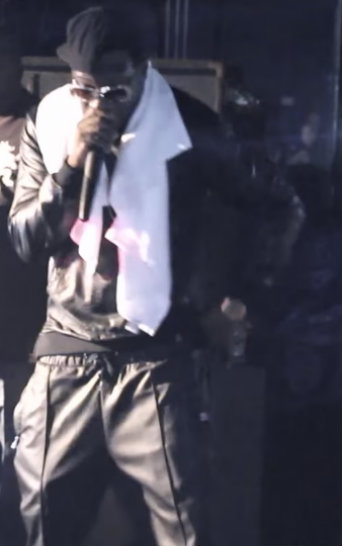
- Dro performing in 2014
- Studio albums: 6
- Singles: 27
- Mixtapes: 21
- Compilation albums: 3

The discography of American rapper Young Dro consists of six studio albums, 21 mixtapes 3 compilation albums and 27 singles (including 17 as a featured artist).

== Albums ==
=== Studio albums ===
List of albums, with selected chart positions
Title	Album details	Peak chart positions		
Title	Album details	US	US R&B	US Rap
I Got That Dro	Released: November 26, 2001; Label: Tight 4 Life; Format: CD	—	—	—
Best Thang Smokin'	Released: August 29, 2006; Label: Grand Hustle, Atlantic; Formats: CD, LP, digital download	3	1	1
High Times	Released: October 15, 2013; Label: Grand Hustle, eOne Music; Formats: CD, digital download	57	13	9
Da Reality Show	Released: September 18, 2015; Label: Grand Hustle, eOne Music; Formats: CD, digital download	—	25	—
Da' Real Atlanta	Released: October 27, 2017; Label: Real Talk; Format: Digital download	—	35	42
HyDROponic	Released: September 20, 2019; Label: Real Talk; Format: Digital download	—	—	—
"—" denotes a recording that did not chart.

=== Compilation albums ===
List of compilation albums with selected details
Title	Album details
We Want Smoke	Released: October 13, 2017; Label: Grand Hustle Records; Format: Digital download
Lost Tapes (with Zaytoven)	Released: February 12, 2021; Label: Zaytoven Global, LLC; Format: Digital doenload
Da Real Atlanta & HyDROponic (Deluxe Edition)	Released: April 8, 2022; Label: Real Talk; Format: Digital download

== Mixtapes ==
List of mixtapes, with year released
Title	Album details
Day One	Released: April 30, 2006; Label: Self-released; Format: Digital download
I Am Legend	Released: February 26, 2008; Label: Grand Hustle; Format: Digital download
R.I.P. (I Killed That Shit)	Released: February 9, 2009; Label: Grand Hustle; Format: Digital download
Black Boy Swag, White Boy Tags (with Yung L.A.)	Released: January 10, 2009; Label: Grand Hustle; Format: Digital download
Dro Street	Released: September 20, 2010; Label: Grand Hustle; Format: Digital download
Equestrian Dro	Released: February 23, 2011; Label: Grand Hustle; Format: Digital download
I Co-Sign Myself	Released: March 17, 2011; Label: Grand Hustle; Format: Digital download
Drocabulary	Released: July 8, 2011; Label: Grand Hustle; Format: Digital download
We Outchea	Released: January 16, 2012; Label: Grand Hustle; Format: Digital download
R.I.P. 2 (I Killed That Shit)	Released: July 24, 2012; Label: Grand Hustle; Format: Digital download
Ralph Lauren Reefa	Released: September 26, 2012; Label: Grand Hustle; Format: Digital download
Day Two	Released: June 17, 2013; Label: Grand Hustle; Format: Digital download
Purple Label	Released: April 20, 2014; Label: Grand Hustle; Format: Digital download
Black Label	Released: April 20, 2014; Label: Grand Hustle; Format: Digital download
Hell Cat (with Zaytoven)	Released: August 5, 2015; Label: Grand Hustle; Format: Digital download
Boot Me Up (with Zaytoven)	Released: May 15, 2016; Label: Grand Hustle; Format: Digital download
Phoenix	Released: May 27, 2016; Label: Grand Hustle; Format: Digital download
Day 3	Released: November 24, 2017; Label: HGGH, Grand Hustle; Format: Digital download
Adderall Flow	Released: October 31, 2018; Label: HGGH, Grand Hustle; Format: Digital download
I Am Legend 2	Released: September 30, 2019; Hosted by DJ Scream; Label: HGGH, Grand Hussle; Format: Digital download
D.P.W.H.	Released: February 11, 2022; Label: HGGH, Grand Hussle; Format: Digital download

== Singles ==
=== As lead artist ===
List of singles, with selected chart positions, showing year released and album name
Title	Year	Peak chart positions			Certifications	Album
Title	Year	US	US R&B	US Rap	Certifications	Album
"Shoulder Lean" (featuring T.I.)	2006	10	1	1	RIAA: 2× Platinum (mastertone)	Best Thang Smokin'
"Rubberband Banks"	2006	— (Note: "Rubberband Banks" did not enter the Billboard Hot 100, but peaked at number 2 on the Bubbling Under Hot 100 Singles chart.)	44	23		Best Thang Smokin'
"Take Off" (featuring Yung L.A.)	2009	—	71	—		non-album singles
"Racked Up"	2011	—	—	—		non-album singles
"FDB"	2013	— (Note: "FDB" did not enter the Billboard Hot 100, but peaked at number 2 on the Bubbling Under Hot 100 Singles chart.)	30	23		High Times
"Strong"	2013	—	—	—		High Times
"We in da City"	2015	—	52	—		Da Reality Show
"Ugh"	2015	—	—	—		Da Reality Show
"Dirty Money"	2017	—	—	—		Da' Real Atlanta
"Hell Is You Doin"	2017	—	—	—		Da' Real Atlanta
"Thank God" (with T.I. and Kirk Franklin featuring Sunday Service Choir)	2024	— (Note: "Thank God" did not enter the Billboard Hot 100 chart, but peaked at number 6 on the Hot Gospel Songs chart and number 1 on the Gospel Airplay chart.)	—	—		Kill the King
"—" denotes a recording that did not chart or was not released in that territory.

=== As featured artist ===
List of singles, with selected chart positions, showing year released and album name
Title	Year	Peak chart positions			Album
Title	Year	US	US R&B	US Rap	Album
"Top Back" (Remix) (T.I. featuring Young Jeezy, Young Dro, Big Kuntry King and B.G.)	2006	—	—	—	Grand Hustle Presents: In da Streetz Volume 4
"Tell 'Em What They Wanna Hear" (Rashad featuring T.I. and Young Dro)	2006	—	76	—	Grand Hustle Presents: In da Streetz Volume 4
"I'm a G" (Yung Joc featuring Young Dro and Bun B)	2007	—	—	—	Hustlenomics
"Ain't I" (Yung L.A. featuring Young Dro and T.I.)	2008	47	7	4	non-album single
"Checkin' My Fresh" (Kia Shine featuring Young Dro and Maino)	2009	—	—	—	2000Shine
"Aint Chu You" (Mike Epps featuring Young Dro and Dorrough)	2009	—	—	—	Funny Bidness: Da Album
"Bring It Back" (8Ball & MJG featuring Young Dro)	2010	—	45	23	Ten Toes Down
"Everything Custom" (LB featuring Young Dro)	2010	—	—	—	non-album singles
"Whatever Man" (Q Machette featuring Gucci Mane and Young Dro)	2010	—	—	—	non-album singles
"She Like It" (Bread Brothers featuring Young Dro and Wingo)	2012	—	—	—	non-album singles
"Loco" (A.Greene featuring Young Dro)	2012	—	—	—	non-album singles
"D.G.D.B." (The Prince of Weed featuring Young Dro)	2012	—	—	—	non-album singles
"10 Racks @ Saks" (XO featuring Young Dro and Ace Boogie)	2013	—	—	—	non-album singles
"Krazy" (Gunplay featuring Young Dro)	2014	—	—	—	MMG Priorities Vol. 3
"Nasty" (Bandit Gang Marco featuring Dro)	2014	41	12	7	Nasty the Album
"Do No Wrong" (Hustle Gang featuring GFMBRYYCE, T.I. and Young Dro)	2017	—	—	—	We Want Smoke
"Friends" (Hustle Gang featuring T.I., RaRa, Brandon Rossi, Tokyo Jetz, Trae tha Truth and Young Dro)	2017	—	—	—	We Want Smoke
"—" denotes a recording that did not chart or was not released in that territory.

== Guest appearances ==
List of non-single guest appearances, with other performing artists, showing year released and album name
Title	Year	Other artist(s)	Album
"Do Ya Thing"	2005	P$C	25 to Life
"Still I Luv Her"	2005	P$C	25 to Life
"Mess It Up"	2005	P$C	25 to Life
"Undertaker"	2006	T.I., Young Buck	King
"Bankhead"	2006	T.I., P$C	King
"Pump Yo Brakes"	2006	AK the Razorman	Xpand & Conquer
"Dip, Slide, Rideout"	2006	DJ Khaled, Big Kuntry King, T.I.	Listennn... the Album
"We Fly High" (Remix)	2006	Jim Jones, Diddy, Birdman, T.I., Jermaine Dupri	A Dipset X-Mas
"Grand Hustle Mafia"	2006	—N/a	Grand Hustle Presents: In da Streetz Volume 4
"My Girl"	2006	T.I.	Grand Hustle Presents: In da Streetz Volume 4
"Aye"	2007	DJ Drama, Big Kuntry King	Gangsta Grillz: The Album
"Let It Go" (Remix)	2007	Keyshia Cole, Missy Elliott, T.I.	Just like You
"Focus"	2008	Big Kuntry King	My Turn to Eat
"A-Town"	2009	DJ Drama, T.I., Sean P, Lonnie Mac	Gangsta Grillz: The Album (Vol. 2)
"Show Off"	2009	T.I.	A Year and a Day
"Mr. Lenox"	2009	Fast Life Yungstaz	Jamboree
"Zone 3"	2009	Mac Boney	—N/a
"They Holla Ayo"	2010	Cam'ron & Vado	Boss of All Bosses 2
"Polo" (Remix)	2010	Vado	—N/a
"Our Time"	2011	P$C	—N/a
"Hot Wheels"	2012	T.I., Travis Porter	Fuck da City Up
"Another Round (Remix)"	2012	Slice 9, Future, B.o.B	—N/a
"Too Cool (Remix)"	2012	Scotty, Playboy Tre, SL Jones	—N/a
"We Still in This Bitch (Remix)"	2013	B.o.B, Young Jeezy, Yo Gotti	—N/a
"Err-Body"	2013	T.I., B.o.B, Trae tha Truth, Chip, Shad da God	G.D.O.D. (Get Dough or Die)
"2 Fucks"	2013	T.I., Chip, Travi$ Scott, Trae tha Truth, B.o.B	G.D.O.D. (Get Dough or Die)
"Poppin for Some"	2013	B.o.B, Yung Booke	G.D.O.D. (Get Dough or Die)
"Kemosabe"	2013	Doe B, B.o.B, T.I.	G.D.O.D. (Get Dough or Die)
"Blocka"	2013	French Montana, Meek Mill, T.I.	G.D.O.D. (Get Dough or Die)
"Problems"	2013	T.I., Mac Boney, Problem, Trae tha Truth, B.o.B	G.D.O.D. (Get Dough or Die)
"Here I Go"	2013	Shad da God, T.I., Spodee, Mystikal	G.D.O.D. (Get Dough or Die)
"Yeap!"	2013	T.I., B.o.B	G.D.O.D. (Get Dough or Die)
"Different Life"	2013	T.I., B.o.B	G.D.O.D. (Get Dough or Die)
"Man Down"	2013	Young Booke, T.I.	G.D.O.D. (Get Dough or Die)
"Chasin Me"	2013	Iggy Azalea, T.I., Kris Stephens	G.D.O.D. (Get Dough or Die)
"211"	2013	FKi	Transformers n the Hood 2
"Freeze Up"	2013	Shad da God, T.I.	Gas Life
"Ball Out"	2013	Shad da God, T.I., Chip	Gas Life
"Shit Like That"	2013	E-40, Spodee	The Block Brochure: Welcome to the Soil 4
"Hell You Sayin'"	2014	Iggy Azalea, T.I., Travi$ Scott	SXEW (South by East West)
"Got Damn	2014	Doe B, Trae Tha Truth	D.O.A.T. 3 (Definition of a Trapper)
"Who We Is (OG)"	2014	Doe B, T.I., Spodee, Trae tha Truth	G.D.O.D. II
"Brand New Choppa"	2014	Travi$ Scott, Meek Mill, T.I., Yung Booke	G.D.O.D. II
"Aint Both (MLK)"	2014	Trae tha Truth, T.I., Spodee, Doe B	G.D.O.D. II
"I Do the Most"	2014	Yung Booke, T.I., Spodee, Shad da God	G.D.O.D. II
"Make Me Something"	2014	Rich Homie Quan, T.I., Spodee, Shad da God	G.D.O.D. II
"Troubled"	2014	Watch The Duck, B.o.B, T.I.	G.D.O.D. II
"Puttin In Work"	2014	Mitchelle'l, Trae tha Truth, T.I., Doe B, 5Mics, Yung Booke	G.D.O.D. II
"Check"	2014	Problem, T.I., Trae tha Truth	G.D.O.D. II
"Bullshit"	2015	Shad da God	2000 and God
"Cash"	2016	Bankroll Mafia	Bankroll Mafia
"Got Damn"	2016	Spodee	The B.I.D., Vol. 2 (The New Testament)
"Grind Mode"	2016	Spodee	The B.I.D., Vol. 2 (The New Testament)
"Tweakin"	2017	B.o.B, London Jae	Ether
"Come Here Lil Bih (Remix)"	2017	Gorilla Zoe	Don't Feed da Animals 2

== See also ==
- Grand Hustle Records discography
