= Dime Trap =

Studio album by T.I.
- Released: October 5, 2018
- Recorded: 2015–2018
- Genres: Hip-hop; trap
- Length: 60:42
- Labels: Grand Hustle; Epic
- Producers: Avedon; Bangladesh; Cardiak; CxMeesen; David Banner; Dave-O; Eric G; FVCES; G.Bliz; Jazzfeezy; JohnnyBoy; Just Blaze; King Vay; London on da Track; VZNARE; Messiah; Mike & Keys; MyGuyMars; Pyro da God; Scott Storch; Shawty Redd; Swizz Beatz; TBHits; THX

T.I. chronology
| Us or Else: Letter to the System (2016) | Dime Trap (2018) | The L.I.B.R.A. (2020) |

Singles from Dime Trap
- 1. "Jefe" Released: September 9, 2018; 2. "Wraith" Released: September 9, 2018; 3. "The Weekend" Released: September 27, 2018

Dime Trap is the tenth studio album by American rapper T.I. It was released on October 5, 2018, by Grand Hustle Records and Epic Records. The album was initially announced in 2014 and underwent several working titles, namely The Return and Trap's Open. It serves as the second installment in a trilogy that was preceded by his ninth album Paperwork, and was later followed by his eleventh The L.I.B.R.A. Throughout the album's production, T.I. worked on several other projects as well, including Da' Nic (2015), Bankroll Mafia (2016), Us or Else: Letter to the System (2016) and We Want Smoke (2017).

The album features guest appearances from Yo Gotti, Teyana Taylor, Jeezy, Meek Mill, Young Thug, YFN Lucci, Anderson .Paak, Victoria Monét, Watch the Duck, Sam Hook and London Jae. Dime Trap also contains narration from American comedian Dave Chappelle. The production was handled by high-profile record producers such as Swizz Beatz, Scott Storch, Bangladesh, Cardiak and David Banner, among others. The album was supported by three singles "Jefe", "Wraith" and "The Weekend".

== Background ==
Upon signing a recording contract with Columbia Records and releasing his ninth album Paperwork in October 2014, T.I. revealed that Paperwork is part of a trilogy and would be followed up with The Return and Love & Liability. During an interview with Life+Times, T.I. said the next album, or rather, "second act" is The Return, and following that, the "third act" is called Love & Liability. According to T.I. the former is going to be reminiscent of his second album Trap Muzik (2003), while the latter is going to be "like a gangster version of 808s & Heartbreak".

T.I. had stated: "I kind of divided them into concepts," referring to the over 200 songs he recorded during the Paperwork sessions. "Conceptually, if you listen to Paperwork all the way down, sonically it's cohesive. You can tell it goes together. It has a theme, a feel, a vibe. I got a whole album full of the [ trap music sound ] coming up next called The Return. That album is already done." On March 16, 2015, T.I. confirmed The Return had been completed. On March 24, 2015, T.I. announced he re-titled the sequel to Paperwork, from The Return to Trap's Open. When pressed for an explanation of the title's meaning, T.I. explained that the album will be "unapologetically gangsta" and boast a "trap sound".

T.I. would later give the album a new title in June 2015, when he rechristened it The Dime Trap. During an interview with MovieWeb, T.I. was asked about his music career and his upcoming album: "My tenth album, The Dime Trap, I'm working on it. I just released the first teaser from it yesterday and it's going to be an extension or a continuation of the vibe from Trap Muzik. I feel like, when you've done hits like "Whatever You Like" and "Dead and Gone," when you do those mainstream kind of "Blurred Lines"-ish kind of records, you don't go and try to top "Blurred Lines." You just come to a whole new element, bring it back down and build the process back over again. I'm breaking it all down, back to the element of where my music first began to interest people, and build it all over again" He also added that "It is a lot more urban, a lot more edgy, a lot more unapologetically ghetto than Paperwork". On September 11, 2015, T.I. revealed Dime Trap would contain 10 songs.

The first record Trap Muzik, it was about the experiences I endured and the lifestyle before I made it in the music industry. With Dime Trap, this is the evolution of trap music and what I learned and some of the epiphanies along the way. I'll talk about the things that really matter to me now.

— T.I. in a September 2018 interview with Billboard.

On September 18, 2015, T.I. announced his departure from Columbia Records. In an interview with HitsDailyDouble.com, he addressed his situation: "Having just exited my deal at Columbia, I was a rogue artist, busting creativity, just waiting to put music in the marketplace, so while I'm sorting out my next situation, I'm blessed enough to be able to control my destiny and put music out as quickly as I want to, and was able to release a Tip album, which I had wanted to do for a long time." On September 22, 2015, in an interview with HotNewHipHop.com, T.I. explained the reasoning behind releasing the project under his alternative pseudonym, saying although it's the second installment to his trilogy, it will be his first TIP album.

On February 22, 2016, before his "pop-up performance" at Greenbriar Mall in his hometown of Atlanta, T.I. announced he signed a distribution deal with fellow American rapper Jay-Z's Roc Nation for Dime Trap. T.I. also revealed he is one of the new co-owners of online streaming service, Tidal. After announcing he was a shareholder of Tidal, there was speculation T.I. would release the album exclusively through Tidal, such as fellow shareholders Beyonce, Kanye West and Rihanna, who all at one point made their newest albums exclusively available on the platform, later releasing it to be heard on Spotify, Apple Music and other services. T.I. however denied theses claims, saying: "This is an album that's dedicated to my core fans. The people who went out there the first week Trap Muzik came out, so I'm basically dedicating this album to them and making the music that I know they want to hear me make. So I know those people all of them can't necessarily afford Tidal. So we will have some exclusive content and exclusive components."

On July 22, 2016, during an interview with Ebro in the Morning on Hot 97, T.I. spoke on the album: "[My new album is] called The Dime Trap. It's my tenth project and it's dedicated to my day one fans. In my eyes it's the second coming of trap music" In May 2017, T.I. told The Associated Press in an interview that he expects to release an album revolving around "trap music" this year. He went on to say he has "two or three albums left in him", adding "it's definitely time to transition."

== Recording and production ==
In July 2015, T.I. revealed Dime Trap was being mixed and mastered. In August 2015, T.I. posted a photo of him in a recording studio with West Coast hip hop music producers, Dr. Dre and DJ Pooh. The photo hinted at a collaboration of some kind, with T.I. using the album's title as the hashtag. In a September 2015 interview with Rolling Stone, T.I. confirmed he had a few recording sessions with Dr. Dre for Dime Trap. In September 2015, T.I. posted a picture of him posing with Jay-Z on Instagram, writing "The 3 young Kings seen in this photo came together for 1reason. Can u guess? Go head,Guess.... CLUE: 3words 10letters. I'll wait.... Answer: "Da Dime Trap."

It's a conversation of where trap music began and the growth and evolution to where it is now, especially what I've learned and what the people have learned from that journey. I try to treat it like a TED talk for trap niggas. If anyone cares about the orders of operation, here it is for you.

— T.I. in a September 2018 interview with Vibe, discussing the concept of Dime Trap.

In July 2016, on Big Boy's Neighborhood radio show, T.I. revealed that he had recorded over 100 songs: "I think the most difficult thing is figuring out which record to put out. You know, which records to put in sequence which will actually make the album. Cause you know after making so many records... We probably have 100 and some change." T.I. also shared that he didn't know which direction he planned on taking the Roc Nation release yet: "I have to pick... Let's say 12 to 16 records out of that. I think that's the most difficult cause you have to figure out what's the tone. What's the tone of the project? What's the message? And how you want to present that energy. And they all like my kids."

In a May 2017 interview with XXL, when asked about Dime Trap's delay, T.I. responded with: "It's been ready for a while. The thing about music is that the things that go on in my life, like it's so much going on, that I make so many different types of records and I'm just dying to see what kind of record this is going to be, you know what I mean? Is it going to be like the way I intended it to be? Like gutter and grimy like Trap Muzik, or is it going to be a culmination of radio records and trap records that make up kind of like a King album was or Paper Trail was? I'm gonna see what collection of songs come out of this. Usually, the newest ones kind of make their way up to the top, but there's some records that I have done that I think are gonna move like people been waiting for.

In September 2017, T.I. previewed two new songs via social media, one of which HotNewHipHop called "an uptempo number that was produced by Zaytoven." In April 2018, T.I. previewed a song featuring YFN Lucci, which Trevor Smith of HotNewHipHop wrote "features a characteristically emotional rap-sung performance by Lucci, while T.I. delivers dexterous triplet flows over sentimental piano chords." In an interview with Vibe, T.I. revealed "Jefe" was originally intended for Meek Mill's album Wins & Losses (2017), however it ultimately found placement on Dime Trap.

== Release and promotion ==
On March 11, 2015, T.I. released a single titled "Project Steps". The song was produced by T.I.'s frequent collaborator, Mars of production team 1500 or Nothin'. On March 24, 2015, T.I. announced his tenth album would be titled Trap's Open. In a June 2015 interview, T.I. revealed his tenth studio album was completed and awaiting release. On June 26, 2015, T.I. released the music video for the single "Project Steps" and announced his tenth album's new title would be The Dime Trap. On September 4, 2015, T.I. released a song titled "Check, Run It", as a single via digital distribution. The song was produced by League of Starz. In promotion for the album, T.I. unexpectedly released an extended play (EP) titled Da' Nic, on September 11, 2015. The EP contains five songs, including the singles "Project Steps" and "Check, Run It". T.I. launched the EP independently, through San Francisco's Empire Distribution. On September 11, T.I. also released the music video for "Check, Run It" and projected a November release date for the album.

On January 20, 2016, T.I. unveiled the album's original cover art via Instagram. On February 16, 2016, T.I. released a new single titled "Money Talk", which was rumored to be the first single for his tenth album. On February 22, after announcing his new distribution deal with Jay-Z's Roc Nation, T.I. released the music video for "Money Talk". Also on February 22, T.I. put together a special "pop up concert" at the Greenbriar Mall in Atlanta, GA. The concert was to both celebrate/promote the release of the single and album, and was made available to stream via Tidal. On May 16, 2016, T.I. released another single, titled "Dope", which was produced by Dr. Dre and features vocals from Marsha Ambrosius. T.I. called "Dope" the "official first single". He premiered the song, alongside its music video, which features cameo appearances from André 3000, Killer Mike, Big Sean, Travis Scott, DJ Drama and Nelly, by way of Tidal.

On July 22, 2016, during an interview with Ebro in the Morning on Hot 97, T.I. announced an EP titled Us or Else, which would be released prior to the album. The EP "will be aimed at supporting the #BlackLivesMatter movement, and will speak explicitly about the twisted road race relations took in America to arrive at its current precarious state." On August 6, 2016, T.I. released the first song for Us or Else, a song titled "We Will Not", in response to the turmoil caused by the injustices going on in America, namely police brutality following the deaths of Philando Castile and Alton Sterling. A compilation followed in December 2016, titled Us or Else: Letter to the System.

On September 7, 2017, T.I. previewed snippets of songs he recorded for the album, including one tentatively titled "Welcome Back to da Trap", produced by Zaytoven. In an October 2017 interview with HipHopDX, when asked about Grand Hustle Records' upcoming albums, T.I. answered with: We Want Smoke is out, and then Translee is coming out on November 27, and Booke is October 27th, and you can wait until December 18 for mine. Just know that whenever you see The Chief [logo] on the project, it's gonna be absolute pandemonium. It gonna go hamburger.

On September 7, 2018, it was announced T.I. signed a distribution deal with Epic Records (Sony Music Entertainment). To commemorate the deal T.I. and Epic released "Jefe" and "Wraith" as dual singles. On September 26, 2018, T.I. released a trailer in promotion for the album which features American comedian Dave Chappelle "moderating as the voice in his head". Additional promotion included T.I. opening a pop-up TrapMusic Museum: "We curated it from conception. The purpose of it was to acknowledge the most significant contributors to the culture. Secondly, inform those who may be least knowledgeable about the genre. And inspire those who are in the environment that inspires the genre." The museum also includes an escape room entitled 'Escape the Trap'.

On September 27, 2018, a song titled "The Weekend" was released as the instant gratification track to those who per-ordered the album. On September 27, 2018, T.I. appeared on Jimmy Kimmel Live!, where he performed a medley of the singles "Jefe" and "The Weekend". On October 4, 2018, T.I. hosted a listening event for the album at the TrapMusic Museum.

On October 12, T.I. shared a promotional video for the album. In the clip, the President of the United States Donald Trump is seen leaving the White House grounds in his helicopter. T.I. is then shown in the Oval Office, followed by a look-alike of First Lady Melania Trump accompanying him and she proceeds to do a strip tease. T.I. shared the video via social media with a caption that takes aim at one of his musical contemporaries: "Dear 45, I ain't Kanye." The video caused controversy, with the First Lady's spokeswoman calling for a boycott of T.I., after labeling the visual "disgusting". The woman who portrayed Melania Trump in the video, Melanie Marden, revealed she's received death threats as she addressed the backlash from T.I.'s promo video in an Instagram post.

On October 24, 2018, T.I. released a preview for a behind-the-scenes documentary of Dime Trap. The Making Of Dime Trap Documentary would be released in collaboration with Rolling Stone.

On September 17, 2019, T.I. released a long-form video for the songs "You" and "Be There", which featured himself and Teyana Taylor as a duo who take violent revenge against sexual predators and a corrupt police officer. The video also highlights Atlanta as a major center of child trafficking in the United States. Taylor is credited as director (under the name "Teyana 'Spike Tee' Taylor"), and T.I. is credited as a writer alongside Taylor's The Aunties Inc.

== Critical reception ==
Professional ratings
Aggregate scores
| Source | Rating |
|---|---|
| Metacritic | 81/100 |
Review scores
| Source | Rating |
| Allmusic | 3.5/5 stars |
| HipHopDX | 4.7/5 stars |
| Pitchfork | 7.4/10 |
| XXL | 4/5 stars |

Dime Trap was released to critical acclaim. At Metacritic, which assigns a normalized rating out of 100 to reviews from critics, the album received an average score of 81, which indicates "universal acclaim", based on 5 reviews. Aaron McKrell of HipHopDX gave the album a 4.7 out of 5 rating. McKrell wrote "Tip's latest sets an example for matured vets who still like to get their hands dirty. Dime Trap is dually nostalgic and relevant, and cements T.I. amongst rap's all-time elite." Stephen Kearse of Pitchfork gave the album a 7.4 out of 10 rating. Kearse praised the album's production, writing: "A murderers' row of both new and seasoned producers match his breezy rapping with zesty beats. For "Jefe," Mr. Bangladesh blends mariachi horns and marching-band percussion into a spirited thump, landing between Nola bounce and Latin trap. Shawty Redd and Pyro da God's "Big Ol Drip" beat is a slow, bluesy burner with bold drops and ragtime riffs. Scott Storch's sparse arrangement on "Wraith" steadily expands and contracts, creating strange little pockets of dead air that T.I. punctures with his newly husky pitch. T.I has dabbled in a range of sounds since his debut, but that range resonates as renewal here." Chris Gibbons of XXL gave the album a 4 out of 5 rating. Gibbons ended the review with "T.I. has always been a chameleon who can do personal tracks, pop singles and hard-nosed street raps just as easily, but with a newfound maturity and vulnerability, this might is his best effort after a string of uneven post-Paper Trail albums. It's probably not as much of an evolution of T.I.'s style as he claims, but it's a more-than-worthy addition to the rapper's canon."

== Commercial performance ==
Dime Trap debuted at number 13 on the US Billboard 200 with 32,000 album-equivalent units, which included 11,000 pure album sales.

== Track listing ==
Dime Trap
| No. | Title | Writer(s) | Producer(s) | Length |
|---|---|---|---|---|
| 1. | "Seasons" (featuring Sam Hook) | Clifford Harris, Jr.; Samuel Jean; Lamar Edwards; Gabrielle "Goldie" Nowee | MyGuyMars; King Vay^{[a]} | 4:35 |
| 2. | "Laugh at Em" | Harris, Jr.; Justin Smith; Carl McCormick | Just Blaze; Cardiak | 3:22 |
| 3. | "Big Ol' Drip" (featuring Watch the Duck) | Harris, Jr.; Jesse Rankins; Demetrius Stewart | Shawty Redd; Pyro da God^{[a]} | 3:18 |
| 4. | "Wraith" (featuring Yo Gotti) | Harris, Jr.; Mario Mims; Scott Spencer Storch | Scott Storch; Avedon^{[a]} | 4:34 |
| 5. | "The Weekend" (featuring Young Thug and Swizz Beatz) | Harris, Jr.; Jeffery Williams; Kasseem Dean | Swizz Beatz | 4:47 |
| 6. | "The Amazing Mr. Fuck Up" (featuring Victoria Monét) | Harris, Jr.; Eric Gabouer; Sade Adu; Janusz Podrazik | Eric G | 3:48 |
| 7. | "At Least I Know" (featuring Anderson .Paak) | Harris, Jr.; Brandon Paak Anderson; London Holmes; LeToya Luckett; Beyoncé Knowles; Kelendria Rowland; Rodney Jerkins; LaShawn Daniels; Latavia Robertson; Freddie Jerkins | London on da Track | 5:23 |
| 8. | "What Can I Say" | Harris, Jr.; Edwards; Lonnie Kimble | MyGuyMars; Mike & Keys^{[a]} | 3:43 |
| 9. | "Jefe" (featuring Meek Mill) | Harris, Jr.; Robert Williams; Shondrae Crawford; Dwight Sonti Brown | Mr. Bangladesh | 3:24 |
| 10. | "More & More" (featuring Jeezy) | Harris, Jr.; Jay Jenkins; Jaswinder Singh; Christopher Meesen | Jazzfeezy; CxMeesen | 4:26 |
| 11. | "Pray for Me" (featuring YFN Lucci) | Harris, Jr.; Rayshawn Bennett; David Grear; Matthew Amis Bell | Dave-O; MB13 Beatz | 3:33 |
| 12. | "Looking Back" | Harris, Jr.; Levell Crump; Chris Goodman | David Banner; THX | 3:31 |
| 13. | "Light Day" | Harris, Jr.; Messiah Harris | Messiah | 3:23 |
| 14. | "You" (featuring Teyana Taylor) | Harris, Jr.; Tommy Brown; Steven Franks; Bianca Atterberry; Charles Anderson | TBHits | 3:50 |
| 15. | "Be There" (featuring London Jae) | Harris, Jr.; London Jae | G.Bliz; johnnyboy; FVCES | 5:05 |
| Total length: | | | | 60:42 |

Notes

- ^{^[a]} signifies an uncredited co-producer
- "Seasons", "What Can I Say", "Jefe", "Pray for Me", and "Looking Back" feature vocals by Dave Chappelle

== Personnel ==
Credits for Dime Trap adapted from AllMusic.

- Sade Adu – Composer
- Ye Ali – Mixing
- Charles Anderson – Composer
- Derek Anderson – Engineer
- Bianca Atterberry – Composer
- Bangladesh – Producer
- David Banner – Producer
- MB13 Beatz – Producer
- Matthew Amis Bell – Composer
- Anita Marisa Boriboon – Creative Director
- Taylor Boudreax – Design
- Dwight Brown – Composer
- Tommy Brown – Composer, Producer
- Cardiak – Producer
- Elliot Carter – Engineer, Mixing
- Bekah Connolly – A&R
- Micky Coyne – Art Direction, Creative Producer
- Shondrae Crawford – Composer
- Lavell Crump – Composer
- CxMeesen – Producer
- LaShawn Daniels – Composer
- Kevin KD Davis – Mixing
- Kasseem Dean – Composer
- DJ Toomp – Executive Producer
- Lamar Edwards – Composer
- Lamar "Myguymars" Edwards – Associate Producer, Producer
- Steven Franks – Composer
- Fvces – Producer
- Eric G – Producer
- G.Bliz – Producer
- Eric Gabouer – Composer
- Chris Goodman – Composer
- David Grear – Composer
- Clifford Harris – Composer
- Messiah Harris – Composer, Producer
- Pete Harvey – Creative Producer
- Nessim Higson – Design
- London Holmes – Composer
- Sam Hook – Featured Artist
- Mark Jackson – A&R
- London Jae – Composer, Featured Artist
- Jazzfeezy – Producer
- Samuel Jean – Composer
- Jeezy – Featured Artist
- Jay Jenkins – Composer
- Freddie Jerkins – Composer
- Rodney Jerkins – Composer
- The Johnny Boy – Producer
- Just Blaze – Engineer, Producer
- Lonnie Kimble – Composer
- Beyoncé Knowles – Composer
- Kris Kuksi – Design
- Ezekiel Lewis – A&R
- London on Da Track – Producer
- LeToya Luckett – Composer
- Fabian Marasciullo – Mixing
- Dina Marto – Product Manager
- Carl McCormick – Composer
- McCoy Socalgargoyle – Assistant
- Meek Mill – Featured Artist
- Christopher Meesen – Composer
- Roc Da Mike – Engineer
- Mario Mims – Composer
- Victoria Monet – Featured Artist
- Gabrielle Nowee – Composer
- Dave O. – Producer
- Matt Olmon – Digital Producer
- Anderson .Paak – Composer, Featured Artist
- Jermaine Pegues – A&R
- Doug Peterson – A&R, Executive Producer, Management
- Janusz Podrazik – Composer
- Jesse Rankins – Composer, Featured Artist
- LaTavia Roberson – Composer
- Kelendria Rowland – Composer
- Shawty Redd – Producer
- Brian Sher – Management
- Jaswinder Singh – Composer
- Justin Smith – Composer
- Demetrius Stewart – Composer
- Scott Storch – Composer, Producer
- Swizz Beatz – Producer
- T.I. – Executive Producer, Primary Artist
- Teyana Taylor – Featured Artist
- THX – Producer
- Jeffery Williams – Composer
- Robert Williams – Composer
- YFN Lucci – Composer, Featured Artist
- Yo Gotti – Featured Artist
- Vivian Yohannes – A&R
- Young Thug – Featured Artist

== Charts ==
| Chart (2018) | Peak position |
|---|---|
| Canadian Albums (Billboard) | 63 |
| US Billboard 200 | 13 |
| US Top R&B/Hip-Hop Albums (Billboard) | 8 |
