= The L.I.B.R.A. =

Studio album by T.I.
- Released: October 16, 2020
- Recorded: 2018–2020
- Studios: Means Street Studios; MakaSound Studio
- Genres: Hip-hop; trap
- Length: 68:12
- Labels: Grand Hustle; Empire
- Producers: Hitmaka; 9th Wonder; Alec Beretz; Antwan "Amadeus" Thompson; Aye YB; Ayo; Ben Harvey; Benjamin Lasiner; Cardiak; Chopsquad DJ; Cubeatz; David Banner; DiMuro; DJ Sidereal; DY Krazy; Elliott Stroud; Foreign Teck; Forest Factory; Halfademic; JazzFeezy; Jonathan Wells; Juicy J; June James; Keyz; Koda Dixon; Lil' C; LukasBL; MyGuyMars; Messiah Harris; MXV; OgTha3; Paul Cabbin; Tariq Beats; Thaddeus Dixon; Thomas Nielsen

T.I. chronology
Dime Trap (2018)	The L.I.B.R.A. (2020)	Kill the King (2026)

Singles from The L.I.B.R.A.
- 1. "Ring" Released: September 11, 2020; 2. "Pardon" Released: October 14, 2020

The L.I.B.R.A. is the eleventh studio album by American rapper T.I. It was released on October 16, 2020, via Grand Hustle Records and Empire Distribution. The title, which references T.I.'s zodiac sign, Libra, also doubles as an acronym for "Legend Is Back Running Atlanta". The album, which was initially titled Love & Liability, serves as the final installment of a trilogy, that was preceded by Paperwork (2014) and Dime Trap (2018).

Production on the album was handled by record producers such as Hitmaka, 9th Wonder, June Jenius, Cardiak, Juicy J, David Banner, Lil' C, Thaddeus Dixon. The album features guest appearances from 21 Savage, 42 Dugg, Benny the Butcher, Conway the Machine, Eric Bellinger, Jadakiss, Jeremih, John Legend, Killer Mike, Lil Baby, London Jae, Mozzy, Rapsody, Rick Ross, Snoop Dogg, Young Thug, and comedian Ms. Pat, among others.

Preceded by two singles, "Ring" and "Pardon", the album peaked at number 18 on the Billboard 200 chart and number nine on the Top R&B/Hip-Hop Albums chart in the United States.

== Background ==
Upon signing a recording contract with Columbia Records and releasing his ninth album Paperwork in October 2014, T.I. revealed that Paperwork is part of a trilogy and would be followed up with The Return and Love & Liability. During an interview with Life+Times, T.I. said the next album, or rather, "second act" is The Return, and following that, the "third act" is called Love & Liability. According to T.I. the former is going to be reminiscent of his second album Trap Muzik (2003), while the latter is going to be "like a gangster version of 808s & Heartbreak". In a 2017 interview on The Breakfast Club radio show, T.I. spoke on his trilogy of albums: "I got, like, two, I got, this next album and two, I got three more albums in my head, conceptualized. […] The next one is more like trap music. It’s Trap Muzik 2017. And the one after that, it’s gonna be more like a, uh, love as it pertains to a dope boy." When speaking on Love & Liability, which ultimately became The L.I.B.R.A., T.I. said “Love & Liability is the story of a young man, who is a solid cat, but his heart finds him in relationships with people who he probably shouldn’t be in relationships with, because of the people they’re in relationships with.

== Release and promotion ==
In October 2020, T.I. revealed that he teamed up with AllHipHop for a stimulus package giveaway: "Since [Donald Trump] said he ain't giving them stimuluses out until after the election, alright...cool. I'm just gon' pick up a little bit, man," he said in the video clip. "We got y'all. Don't even trip." All interested fans had to do was vote on their favorite songs from each of T.I.'s previous studio albums in the lead-up to the release of The L.I.B.R.A. In total, $12,000 was on the line as one fan was randomly selected to win $1,200 each day.

== Critical reception ==
Professional ratings
Aggregate scores
Source	Rating
Metacritic	70/100
Review scores
Source	Rating
AllMusic	3.5/5 stars
Beats Per Minute	76%
HipHopDX	4.1/5
Pitchfork	5.4/10

The L.I.B.R.A. was met with generally favorable reviews from music critics. At Metacritic, which assigns a normalized rating out of 100 to reviews from mainstream publications, the album received an average score of 70 based on four reviews.

Riley Wallace of HipHopDX found the album "could have benefitted from a few snips here and there, but overall it's a reasonably satisfying listen and a tangible reminder that the self-proclaimed King Of The South hasn't lost his edge". Chase McMullen of Beats Per Minute wrote that the project is "a generous, compulsively enjoyable statement, unburdened of commercial pressure in a way that's all too rare in this numbers game". AllMusic's Fred Thomas wrote: "The entire record is a victorious display of self-celebration, but the impact of T.I.'s years in the rap game are felt most directly on tracks where he's matching wit and lyrical dexterity with rappers from the generation that directly followed him". In a mixed review, Trey Alston of Pitchfork resumed: "these songs introduce nothing new to T.I.'s story or sound, but they're exactly what you'd expect to find 13 tracks deep into a curated rap playlist on a streaming service".

== Commercial performance ==
The L.I.B.R.A. debuted at number 18 on the Billboard 200 with first week sales of 23,500 album units.

== Track listing ==
The L.I.B.R.A. track listing
No.	Title	Writer(s)	Producer(s)	Length
1.	"The L.I.B.R.A. Introduction" (featuring Ms. Pat)	Clifford Harris, Jr.; Patricia Williams; Ryan Golden; Jaswinder Singh	JazzFeezy; Halfademic	3:08
2.	"Hit Dogs Holla" (featuring Tokyo Jetz)	C. Harris; Shauntrell Pender; Christan Ward; Aye YB	Hitmaka; Aye YB	2:01
3.	"Ring" (featuring Young Thug)	C. Harris; Jeffery Williams; Dwan Avery; Darrell Jackson	DY Krazy; Chopsquad DJ	2:54
4.	"Pardon" (featuring Lil Baby)	C. Harris; Dominique Jones; Ace Redd; Ward; June James; Barry White	Hitmaka; June James	4:19
5.	"On the Hood" (featuring 42 Dugg and Mozzy)	C. Harris; Dion Hayes; Timothy Patterson; Antwan Thompson; Michael DiMuro; Benjamin Lasnier; Lukas Benjamin Kroll Leth	Amadeus; DiMuro; Benjamin Lasnier; Lukas BL	4:04
6.	"Moon Juice" (with Snoop Dogg featuring Jeremih)	C. Harris; Calvin Broadus Jr.; Jeremy Felton; Carl McCormick; Ward; Lerron Carson; Tracy Davis; Keiwan Spillman; Danny Means; Kevin Gilliam	Cardiak; Hitmaka; Paul Cabbin	3:35
7.	"Air & Water Interlude" (featuring Rapsody)	Marlanna Evans; Jonathan Wells; Koda Dixon	Wells; Koda Dixon	1:39
8.	"Hypno" (featuring Rahky)	C. Harris; Racquelle Anteola; Jordan Houston; Christopher Wallace; Deric Angelettie; Andy Armer; Randy Alpert; Todd Gaither; Kim Jones	Juicy J	2:20
9.	"1/2 Ticket" (featuring London Jae and Conway the Machine)	C. Harris; Jaucquez Lowe; Demond Price; Ward; James	Hitmaka; June Jenius; Cubeatz	3:28
10.	"Respect the Code" (with Rick Ross featuring Kes Kross)	C. Harris; William Roberts II; Lamar Edwards	MyGuyMars	3:35
11.	"Put Some on It"	C. Harris; Edwards; Altari Crapps	Foreign Teck; MyGuyMars; Tariq Beats	2:24
12.	"Family Connect" (featuring Domani)	C. Harris; Domani Harris; Messiah Harris; Carnegie Clapp; James Maia; Ron Maia	Messiah	3:27
13.	"Make Amends" (featuring Benny the Butcher and Jadakiss)	C. Harris; Jeremie Pennick; Jason Phillips; Ray Robinson; Thaddeus Dixon	Thaddeus Dixon	3:44
14.	"Fire & Earth Interlude" (featuring Ernestine Johnson Morrison)	Ernestine Johnson Morrison; Wells; K. Dixon	Wells; K. Dixon	2:00
15.	"Pantone Blue" (featuring Alec Beretz)	C. Harris; Alec Beretz; Samuel Matthew; Thomas Nielsen	Alec Beretz; DJ Sidereal; Thomas Nielsen	4:20
16.	"Horizons"	C. Harris; Patrick Douthit; MaryLynn Gillaspie; Stanley Turrentine	9th Wonder	4:04
17.	"How I Feel" (featuring Eric Bellinger and Killer Mike)	C. Harris; Eric Bellinger; Michael Render; Lavell Crump; Forest Factory; Monte Moir	David Banner; Forest Factory	5:22
18.	"We Did It Big" (with John Legend)	C. Harris; John Stephens; Oliver Grose III; Kassim Washington; Darwin Quinn; Adrian McKinnon; Ben Harvey	Lil' C; MXV; Ben Harvey; OgTha3	5:19
19.	"Thank God" (featuring 21 Savage)	C. Harris; Shayaa Bin Abraham-Joseph; Austin Owens; James Foye III; Ward	Ayo; Keyz; Hitmaka	4:38
20.	"Deyjah's Conclusion"	Deyjah Harris; M. Harris; Elliott Stroud	Messiah; Stroud	1:40

== Personnel ==
Credits for The L.I.B.R.A. adapted from AllMusic.

- 21 Savage – Featured Artist
- 42 Dugg – Featured Artist
- Eric Bellinger – Featured Artist
- Benny the Butcher – Featured Artist
- Alec Beretz – Featured Artist
- Conway the Machine – Featured Artist
- Domani – Featured Artist
- Jadakiss – Featured Artist
- London Jae – Featured Artist
- Jeremih – Featured Artist
- Killer Mike – Featured Artist
- John Legend – Primary Artist
- Lil Baby – Featured Artist
- Ernestine Johnson Morrison – Featured Artist
- Mozzy – Featured Artist
- Ms. Pat – Featured Artist
- Rahky – Featured Artist
- Rapsody – Featured Artist
- Rick Ross – Primary Artist
- Snoop Dogg – Primary Artist
- T.I. – Primary Artist
- Tokyo Jetz – Featured Artist
- Young Thug – Featured Artist

== Charts ==
Chart performance for The L.I.B.R.A.
Chart (2020)	Peak position
US Billboard 200	18
US Top R&B/Hip-Hop Albums (Billboard)	9
US Independent Albums (Billboard)	3
