= Da Drought 3 =

Mixtape by Lil Wayne
- Released: April 13, 2007
- Recorded: 2006–2007
- Genre: Hip-hop
- Length: 108:06
- Label: Young Money * Cash Money
- Producers: Various: AllDay; The Beatstaz; Beyoncé; Black Elvis; Blackout Movement; Butta; Cameron Wallace; Danger Mouse; Danja; Digga; DJ Khaled; DJ Toomp; Dr. Dre; Edward Hinson; Havoc; Jeff Page; Just Blaze; Kanye West; L.E.S.; Lil' C; Lil Jon; Mannie Fresh; Mike Moosh; Mouse; Myke Diesel; Nealante; Polow da Don; Pro J; Rashad Smith; Robin Thicke; Rodney O & Joe Cooley; The Runners; Scott Storch; Sean Garrett; Ski; Swizz Beatz; Terry Allen; T-Mix; Trackmasters; Unk; Wyldfyer

Lil Wayne chronology
| Like Father, Like Son (2006) | Da Drought 3 (2007) | The Leak (2007) |

Da Drought 3 is the seventh mixtape by Lil Wayne, released on April 13, 2007.

== Background ==
This is the third in the trilogy of mixtapes in Da Drought series. Released in 2007, the mixtape was delayed slightly as a result of Wayne's last-minute decision to add songs to the album's second disc. The album is available as a free legal download. It only contains remixes of other songs. It is noted for Lil Wayne's use of similes, liquid non sequiturs, and metaphors.

When speaking to MTV about the double mixtape, Lil Wayne stated that he did not plan on two discs being released until he found how many songs he had recorded. He also stated he did not have a preconceived plan on how to choose the songs:

The radio be on and whatever song comes on, add that instrumental to it.

On August 5, 2025, the mixtape, along with Da Drought and Da Drought 2, all became available on streaming services for the first time since their initial releases. However, later that same week, the latter two were removed from streaming for unknown reasons, leaving only Da Drought 3 available.

== Reception ==
Professional ratings
Review scores
| Source | Rating |
|---|---|
| AllMusic | 4/5 stars |
| MSN Music (Consumer Guide) | A |
| Pitchfork | 8.5/10 |
| Sputnikmusic | 4.5/5 |
| Stylus Magazine | B+ |
| URB | 4.5/5 stars |

Da Drought 3 received acclaim from critics and was hailed as the best mixtape of 2007 by MTV News. Lil Wayne was officially named the "Hottest MC" by their hip-hop brain trust. It was also nominated for mixtape of the year at the Ozone Awards but lost to Killer Mike's I Pledge Allegiance to the Grind. The album was #27 on Rolling Stone's list of the Top 50 Albums of 2007. Online music magazine Pitchfork placed Da Drought 3 at number 99 on their list of the Top 200 albums of the 2000s and in 2016 they listed it number one on their list of the 50 Best Rap Mixtapes of the Millennium.

== Track listing ==
=== Disc one ===
| # | Title | Length | Samples |
|---|---|---|---|
| 1 | "Intro" | 2:19 | "This Is Why I'm Hot" by Mims; "Jesus Walks" by Kanye West; "Shook Ones, Part II" by Mobb Deep; "Nuthin' but a 'G' Thang" by Dr. Dre featuring Snoop Dogg; "Tell Me When to Go" by E-40 featuring Keak Da Sneak |
| 2 | "Black Republicans" (feat. Juelz Santana) | 3:13 | "Black Republican" by Nas featuring Jay-Z |
| 3 | "Upgrade" | 4:12 | "Upgrade U" by Beyoncé featuring Jay-Z |
| 4 | "Put Some Keys on That" | 3:58 | "Throw Some D's" by Rich Boy |
| 5 | "Ride 4 My Niggas (Sky's the Limit)" | 5:20 | "Mr. Jones" by Mike Jones; "Off wit His Head "by Big Pun |
| 6 | "Can't Stop, Won't Stop" (feat. Nicki Minaj) | 2:31 | "Can't Stop, Won't Stop" by Young Gunz; "Stuntin' Like My Daddy" by Birdman & Lil Wayne |
| 7 | "We Takin' Over" (Remix) | 2:22 | "We Takin' Over" by DJ Khaled featuring Akon, T.I., Rick Ross, Fat Joe, Birdman and Lil Wayne |
| 8 | "Get High, Rule the World" | 3:49 | "If I Ruled the World (Imagine That)" by Nas featuring Lauryn Hill |
| 9 | "I Can't Feel My Face" | 3:42 | "Everlasting Bass" by Rodney O & Joe Cooley |
| 10 | "Dough Is What I Got" | 3:49 | "Show Me What You Got" by Jay-Z |
| 11 | "Seat Down Low" | 3:12 | "Top Back" by T.I. |
| 12 | "New Cash Money" (feat. Brisco) | 4:17 | "Down and Out" by Cam'ron featuring Kanye West |
| 13 | "Promise" | 4:31 | "Promise" by Ciara |
| 14 | "Outro" | 0:30 | |

=== Disc two ===
| # | Title | Length | Samples |
|---|---|---|---|
| 1 | "Intro" | 0:33 | |
| 2 | "Blooded" | 4:04 | "I Luv It" by Young Jeezy |
| 3 | "Live From 504" | 2:21 | "Shoulder Lean" by Young Dro featuring T.I. |
| 4 | "King Kong" | 4:11 | "King Kong" by Jibbs featuring Chamillionaire |
| 5 | "Dipset" | 4:07 | "Reppin' Time" by Jim Jones |
| 6 | "Forever" | 2:14 | "Dipset Forever" by Cam'ron |
| 7 | "Walk It Out" | 3:02 | "Walk It Out" by Unk |
| 8 | "Swizzy" (Remix) | 2:21 | "It's Me Bitches" by Swizz Beatz |
| 9 | "Boom" | 3:22 | "Zoom" by Lil' Boosie featuring Yung Joc |
| 10 | "N.O. Nigga" | 2:49 | "Go Getta" by Young Jeezy featuring R. Kelly |
| 11 | "Back on My Grizzy" | 4:12 | "Chop Chop" by YoungBloodZ |
| 12 | "Dipset 2" | 4:00 | "Dipset (Santana's Town)" by Juelz Santana |
| 13 | "President" (feat. Curren$y) | 3:38 | "Dead Presidents" by Jay-Z |
| 14 | "Crazy" | 4:30 | "Crazy" by Gnarls Barkley |
| 15 | "Outro" | 10:00 | "Lost Without U" by Robin Thicke |
