= Top Back =

2006 single by T.I.

"Top Back (Remix)"

Single by T.I. featuring Young Jeezy, Young Dro, Big Kuntry King and B.G.

from the album Grand Hustle Presents: In da Streetz Volume 4 and King
- Released: December 12, 2006 (U.S.)
- Genre: Southern hip hop
- Length: 4:42 (King version); 4:37 (Remix version)
- Label: Grand Hustle; Atlantic
- Songwriters: C. Harris; J. Jenkins; D. Hart; S. Merrett; C. Dorsey; B. Thomas
- Producer: Mannie Fresh

Grand Hustle singles chronology
"Top Back (Remix)" (2006)	"Memories Back Then" (2013)

T.I. singles chronology
"Pac's Life" (2006)	"Top Back (Remix)" (2006)	"We Fly High (Remix)" (2006)

Young Jeezy singles chronology
"I Luv It" (2006)	"Top Back (Remix)" (2006)	"Go Getta" (2007)

Young Dro singles chronology
"Rubberband Banks" (2006)	"Top Back (Remix)" (2006)	"We Fly High (Remix)" (2006)

Big Kuntry King singles chronology
"Do Ya Thang" (2006)	"Top Back (Remix)" (2006)	"That's Right" (2007)

B.G. singles chronology
"Move Around" (2006)	"Top Back (Remix)" (2006)	"For a Minute" (2007)

Music video
- "Top Back (Remix)" on YouTube

"Top Back" is a song by American rapper T.I., taken from his fourth studio album King (2006). The song, produced by Mannie Fresh, was released December 12, 2006.

== Remix ==
The remix features fellow American rappers Young Jeezy, Young Dro, Big Kuntry King and B.G. T.I. performed the remix at the BET Hip Hop Awards on November 15, 2006.

The song was also remixed in 2007, by American rapper Lil Wayne, freestyling over the song's beat for his mixtape Da Drought 3. The freestyle was titled "Seat Down Low".

== Other versions ==
- "Top Back" (Amended Mix)
- "Top Back" (Remix Instrumental)
- "Top Back" (Explicit Mix Version)

== Charts ==
=== Weekly charts ===
Chart (2006–2007)	Peak position
US Billboard Hot 100	29
US Hot R&B/Hip-Hop Songs (Billboard)	13
US Hot Rap Songs (Billboard)	8
US Pop Airplay (Billboard)	39
US Rhythmic Airplay (Billboard)	39

=== Year-end charts ===
Chart (2007)	Position
US Hot R&B/Hip-Hop Songs (Billboard)	48

== Certifications ==
Region	Certification	Certified units/sales
United States (RIAA) Mastertone	Gold	500,000^{*}
^{*} Sales figures based on certification alone.

== Release history ==
Region	Date	Format(s)	Label(s)	Ref.
United States	October 30, 2006	Rhythmic contemporary radio	Atlantic	
