= Shoulder Lean =

Single by Young Dro featuring T.I.

from the album Best Thang Smokin'
- Released: March 3, 2006
- Recorded: 2005
- Genre: Southern hip hop
- Length: 4:20
- Label: Atlantic; Grand Hustle
- Songwriters: Clifford Harris; D'Juan Hart; Cordale Quinn
- Producer: Lil' C

Young Dro singles chronology
"Shoulder Lean" (2006)	"Rubberband Banks" (2006)

T.I. singles chronology
"Why You Wanna" (2006)	"Shoulder Lean" (2006)	"My Love" (2006)

"Shoulder Lean" is a song by American rapper Young Dro, released on March 3, 2006, as his debut single and the lead single from his first album Best Thang Smokin'. The song features fellow rapper T.I. on the hook. The production was handled by Grand Hustle in-house producer Cordale "Lil' C" Quinn. The song was a hit in the United States, reaching the Top 10 on the Billboard Hot 100 and number one on the Hot R&B/Hip Hop Songs chart. This was Young Dro's only hit single as a lead artist, and T.I.'s fourth Top 10 single.

A freestyle over the song's production, entitled "Live from the 504" by Lil Wayne, is featured on his mixtape Da Drought 3 (2007).

== Music video ==
The music video for "Shoulder Lean", directed by President Thomas Forbes, makes references to the respective video of the Dr. Dre and Snoop Dogg song "Nuthin But A "G" Thang". The video includes cameo appearances from Lil C, DJ Drama, DJ Khaled, Slim Thug, Big Gipp, Shay "Buckeey" Johnson, Gotti, Shawty Hughley Young, Dallas Austin, Lil Duval, Big Kuntry King, AK Parlae, and Grand Hustle vice president Claybourne "Clay" Evans Jr., who died in March 2023.

== Charts ==
=== Weekly charts ===
Chart (2006)	Peak position
US Billboard Hot 100	10
US Hot R&B/Hip-Hop Songs (Billboard)	1
US Pop 100 (Billboard)	33
US Hot Rap Songs (Billboard)	1
US Rhythmic Airplay (Billboard)	6

=== Year-end charts ===
Chart (2006)	Position
US Billboard Hot 100	59
US Hot R&B/Hip-Hop Songs (Billboard)	13
US Rhythmic (Billboard)	27

=== Certifications ===
Region	Certification	Certified units/sales
Canada (Music Canada) Ringtone	Gold	20,000^{*}
United States (RIAA) Mastertone	2× Platinum	2,000,000^{*}
^{*} Sales figures based on certification alone.

== Radio and release history ==
Country	Date	Format	Label
United States	May 2, 2006	Rhythmic contemporary radio	Grand Hustle Records, Atlantic Records
United States	May 9, 2006	Urban contemporary radio	Grand Hustle Records, Atlantic Records
United States	June 27, 2006	Digital download	Grand Hustle Records, Atlantic Records
United States	September 5, 2006	Contemporary hit radio	Grand Hustle Records, Atlantic Records

== See also ==
- List of number-one R&B hits
- T.I. discography
- Young Dro discography
