= Spot (rapper) =

American rapper

SPOT
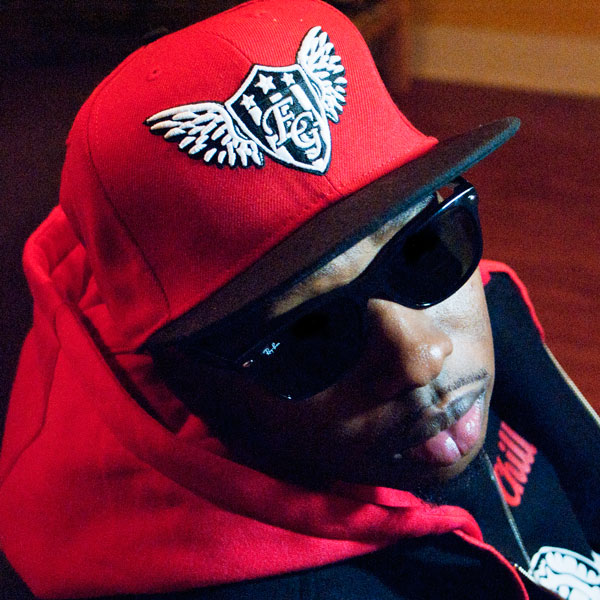
- SPOT on the Set of "That's Just Me"

Background information
- Born: August 8, 1987 (age 37)
- Origin: Brooklyn, New York / Atlanta, Georgia, U.S.
- Genres: Rap, hip hop
- Occupation: Rapper
- Years active: 2006–present
- Website: beingspot.com

SPOT or BeingSpot is an American rapper from Brooklyn. He became known in Atlanta, Georgia for his album, The Good Son.

== Background ==
The eldest son of Jamaican and Guyanese parents, SPOT initially lived in many different parts of the United States. As a child Hargett and his family relocated to Coney Island, a neighborhood in Brooklyn, New York. His childhood was spent between Brooklyn, Harlem, New York and Atlanta, GA. A talented yet troublesome child, Spot traveled the country playing basketball with top AAU clubs during his preteen years. Spot has described growing up in the projects as "vicious."

== Career ==
Spot first came into the public view in 2004, when he teamed with Jimmy Henchman and Bryce Wilson to kick-start newly formed music company Czar Entertainment. With Czar signing a distribution deal with Sony Music Group, Spot seemed primed to release an album, although he had just begun rapping and producing. A fast learner in the studio, Spot began working with major label artist of various genres, including Mario Winans, Miri Bin-Ari, Foxy Brown, Swizz Beatz, Black Rob, and El Debarge, and working on a posthumous Notorious B.I.G. album.

He then released the mixtape The Good Son. Alongside former DJ and Def Jam Records exec Sickamore, The Good Son featured collaborations with Jim Jones, Papoose and production from Just Blaze, the SupaSonics and SPOT himself. Moving over 25,000 copies, this mixtape established Spot as one of top newcomers on the indie circuit.

After touring the country with the likes of Akon and David Banner and performing at various infamous NY prisons including Rikers Island and Arthur Kills Maximum Penitentiary, Spot made history becoming the first rapper to promote a mixtape on MTV when he appeared on Sucka Free (formerly Direct Effects) to promote his second foray into the mixtape game, A Dollar & A Dream.

Packaged as a street album, A Dollar & A Dream was a success worldwide, even garnering the best album ratings of the year by one French publication. Spot has produced the score for a platinum DVD series (The Infamous Times) and a syndicated television show (Hip Hop Hold 'Em) and contributed music to both MTV, BET and VH1 (various programming).

SPOT is managed by Grand Hustle/Rubicon Brand Management (Grand Hustle Records) and released a Gangsta Grillz mixtape with DJ Drama titled The Price Iz Right. Spot was named one of AOL Music's 10 Rising Rappers.

== Mixtape albums ==
Album	Released
A Dollar & A Dream	2008
The Good Son	2006
The Price Iz Right w/ DJ Drama	2012
