= Wit' Me =

"Wit Me"

Single by T.I. featuring Lil Wayne
- Released: May 21, 2013
- Recorded: 2013
- Genre: Southern hip hop
- Length: 5:05
- Label: Grand Hustle
- Songwriters: Clifford Harris, Jr.; Dwayne Carter; Cordale Quinn
- Producer: Lil' C

T.I. singles chronology
| "Memories Back Then" (2013) | "Wit Me" (2013) | "I Wish" (2013) |

Lil Wayne singles chronology
| "No New Friends" (2013) | "Wit Me" (2013) | "We Outchea" (2013) |

Music video
- "Wit Me" on YouTube

"Wit Me" is a song by American hip hop recording artist T.I., released on May 21, 2013, as a single to promote his 2013 America's Most Wanted concert tour, with fellow American rapper Lil Wayne. The song, which features Lil Wayne, was produced by Grand Hustle in-house producer Cordale "Lil' C" Quinn. The song has since peaked at number 80 on the US Billboard Hot 100 chart.

== Music video ==
The music video, directed by Philly Fly Boy, was released on May 21, 2013. As of March 2021 it has over 40 million views.

== Track listing ==
Digital single

| No. | Title | Writer(s) | Producer(s) | Length |
|---|---|---|---|---|
| 1. | "Wit Me" (featuring Lil Wayne) | Clifford Harris, Jr., Dwayne Carter, Cordale Quinn | Lil' C | 5:05 |

== Charts ==
| Chart (2013) | Peak position |
|---|---|
| US Billboard Hot 100 | 80 |
| US Hot R&B/Hip-Hop Songs (Billboard) | 27 |

== Release history ==
| Country | Date | Format | Label |
|---|---|---|---|
| United States | May 21, 2013 | Digital download | Grand Hustle |
