= Lil' C (music producer) =

- Also known as: C-Gutta
- Born: Darwin Cordale Quinn; October 7, 1987 (age 38); Jackson, Mississippi, U.S.
- Origin: Atlanta, Georgia, U.S.
- Genres: Hip hop; R&B; pop
- Occupations: Record producer; songwriter; rapper
- Instruments: Keyboards; drums
- Years active: 2001–present
- Labels: Gutta Muzik; Kobalt Music Group; Grand Hustle; One Life Productions LLC.

Darwin Cordale Quinn (born October 7, 1987), known professionally as Lil' C (also known as C-Gutta), is an American hip hop record producer, songwriter, and rapper. He is perhaps best known for producing Atlanta-based rapper Young Dro's 2006 debut single, "Shoulder Lean", which led to a deal with Grand Hustle Records. Quinn is also part of the record production team Smash Factory, alongside frequent collaborator Mars and Grand Hustle label-boss T.I.

== Musical career ==
Quinn began producing hip hop beats as a means to make money and pay his bills. He embarked on this path at a young age, selling beats to classmates at the high school he attended. At fifteen, he was working in a studio that was housed under Hot 97.7 in Jackson, Mississippi, which is how he made a lot of connections in the music industry early on.

At the age 17, Quinn produced the song "My Hood", for Young Jeezy, which was the third single from his debut album Let's Get It: Thug Motivation 101 (2005). He would later meet Jason Geter, the chief executive officer (CEO) of American rapper T.I.'s Grand Hustle Records. Geter flew Quinn out to Atlanta, Georgia on the day of the "I'm A King", music video shoot. Quinn took his keyboard with and went on to impress Geter with his skills, leading to a deal as an in-house producer for Grand Hustle. He gained major recognition in 2006, after producing "Shoulder Lean", from Grand Hustle artist Young Dro’s debut album Best Thang Smokin' (2006). It sold over 2 million ringtones and was a top 10 hit on the Billboard Hot 100, which led him to his first co-publishing deal with Warner Chappell Music at the age of 18. In 2007, Quinn and T.I. formed a record production and songwriting team called The Smash Factory, alongside Lamar "Mars" Edwards of 1500 or Nothin'.

In late 2014, Quinn produced the remix of "Heaven Knows" for the fifth season winner of The Voice, Tessanne Chin. "Heaven Knows (Remix)" was released as a single by Republic Records in November 2014. In early 2015, Quinn signed with Kobalt Music Group on a new Administration deal. Also in 2015, Quinn produced "Offset" for T.I. and Young Thug, which is included on the soundtrack to the film Furious 7.

== Production discography ==
=== Singles produced ===
List of singles as either producer or co-producer, with selected chart positions and certifications, showing year released, performing artists and album name
Title	Year	Peak chart positions				Certifications	Album
Title	Year	US	US R&B	US Rap	US Pop	Certifications	Album
"My Hood" (Young Jeezy)	2005	70	30	19	93		Let's Get It: Thug Motivation 101
"Shoulder Lean" (Young Dro featuring T.I.)	2006	10	1	1	—	RIAA: 2× Platinum	Best Thang Smokin'
"Rubberband Banks" (Young Dro)	2006	102	44	23	—		Best Thang Smokin'
"Checkin My Fresh" (Kia Shine featuring Young Dro and Maino)	2009	—	—	—	—		2000Shine
"Don't Do It" (Spodee)	2010	—	—	—	—		Spodee
"Like That" (T.I.)	2012	—	—	—	—		Trouble Man: Heavy Is the Head
"For the Road" (Tyga featuring Chris Brown)	2013	115	39	—	—		Hotel California
"Wit' Me" (T.I. featuring Lil Wayne)	2013	80	27	—	—		non-album single
"Krazy" (Gunplay featuring Young Dro)	2014	—	—	—	—		MMG Priorities Vol. 3
"Heaven Knows (Remix)" (Tessanne Chin)	2014	—	—	—	—		non-album single
"Love Suicide" (Tessanne Chin)	2016	—	—	—	—		non-album single
"I Think She Like Me" (Rick Ross featuring Ty Dolla $ign)	2017	—	—	—	—		Rather You Than Me
"Tribe" (Jidenna)	2019	—	—	—	—		85 to Africa
"—" denotes a recording that did not chart or was not released in that territory.

=== Other songs ===
List of non-single songs produced, co-produced and remixed by title, with performing artists and other credited producers, showing year released and album name
Title	Year	Artist(s)	Album	Co-producer(s)	
"Gangsta"	2006	Young Dro	Best Thang Smokin'	none	
"Who You Callin' A Bitch"	2006	Xtaci	Grand Hustle Presents: In da Streetz Volume 4	none	
"My Girl"	2006	Young Dro, T.I.	Grand Hustle Presents: In da Streetz Volume 4	none	
"Ready 4 War"	2006	Z-Ro, Lil' C, Archie Lee, Trae, Dougie, Lil B, Jay'Ton, 3–2, Dyno	Slow, Loud and Bangin', Volume 3	none	
"Raw"	2007	T.I.	T.I. vs. T.I.P.	none	
"On That Purp"	2007	Big Kuntry King	The Corporate Hustle	none	
"Gone"	2008	Ricco Barrino	Respect the Hustle, Vol. 2	none	
"In the Shower"	2008	Young Dro, Ricco Barrino	Respect the Hustle, Vol. 2	none	
"Porn Star"	2008	T.I., Ricco Barrino	Paper Trail	none	
"Boo"	2009	8Ball & MJG, T.I.	—N/a	none	
"A-Town"	2009	DJ Drama, T.I., Young Dro, Sean P, Lonnie Mac	Gangsta Grillz: The Album (Vol. 2)	none	
"King on Set"	2009	T.I., Young Dro	Music Inspired by More than a Game	1500 or Nothin'	
"I Don't Know Y'all"	2009	Young Dro, Yung L.A.	R.I.P. (I Killed That Shit)	none	
"What They Do"	2010	8Ball & MJG, T.I.	Ten Toes Down	1500 or Nothin'	
"5th Dimension"	2010	B.o.B, Ricco Barrino	B.o.B Presents: The Adventures of Bobby Ray	B.o.B, T.I.	
"Yeah"	2010	T.I., Lil Wayne	Fuck a Mixtape	none	
"Yeah Ya Know"	2010	T.I.	Fuck a Mixtape	DJ Toomp	
"Like So"	2010	T.I.	Fuck a Mixtape	none	
"Bitch Who"	2010	T.I., Mac Boney	Fuck a Mixtape	none	
"How Life Changed"	2010	T.I., Mitchelle'l, Scareface	No Mercy	Emaydee	
"Strip"	2010	T.I., Young Dro, Trey Songz	No Mercy	none	
"Like So"	2010	T.I.	No Mercy	none	
"Much More"	2011	Future	Dirty Sprite	none	
"Follow Me Home"	2011	Big Kuntry King, C-Gutta, Mitchelle'l	Everything Big	none	
"I Might Have to Go"	2011	T-Pain	Prevolver	none	T-Pain
"At the Top"	2011	Killer Mike	Bang x3	none	
"Pay Up"	2011	Killer Mike	Bang x3	none	
"Cash Out"	2011	Killer Mike	Bang x3	none	
"Soundtrack"	2011	Spodee	No Pressure	none	
"Fire (Go Head)"	2011	Spodee	No Pressure	none	
"Hard or Soft"	2011	Spodee	No Pressure	none	
"Sunlight"	2011	Spodee, Mitchelle'l, B.o.B	No Pressure	B.o.B	
"Higher Learning"	2011	Young Jeezy, Snoop Dogg, Devin the Dude, Mitchelle'l	TM:103 Hustlerz Ambition	Emaydee	
"Epic"	2011	B.o.B, Meek Mill, Playboy Tre	E.P.I.C. (Every Play Is Crucial)	none	
"Good Luvin"	2011	Rashad Morgan	Special Delivery	none	
"Make You Say I"	2011	2012	Ricco Barrino	none	Twenty 12 Play
"How It Looks"	D.O.P.E.	2012	D.O.P.E.	none	
"La Folie Des Grandeurs"	Gizo Evoracci, Mitchelle'l	2012	Overdose	none	
"Me, Myself, My Money"	Iggy Azalea	2012	Glory	none	
"Heart of a King"	Dee 1, Rapper Big Pooh	2012	The Focus Tape	none	
"MJ"	B.o.B, Nelly	2012	Strange Clouds	Unik	
"Cruisin'"	T.I.	2012	Trouble Man: Heavy Is the Head	none	
"Whatever I Want"	Cash Out, French Montana	2012	Keisha	none	
"Take 'Em Out"	2013	Young Dro	Day Two	none	
"Nope"	2013	Young Dro, T.I.	Day Two	6 Mile JP, OG Whitehouse	
"Got Damn"	2014	Doe B, Trae tha Truth, Young Dro	D.O.A.T. 3 (Definition of a Trapper)	6 Mile JP, OG Whitehouse	
"Quintana, Pt. 2"	2014	Travi$ Scott, T.I.	Days Before Rodeo	Mike Dean, Southside, AudioKlique	
"Complicated"	2014	Young Dro	Black Label	Mike Dupree	
"I Know"	2014	Young Dro	Purple Label	AudioKlique	
"Get to It"	2014	Young Dro, Yung Booke	Purple Label	AudioKlique	
"Can't Stay"	2014	Ty Dolla $ign, T.I.	Sign Language	Mars	
"I Need War"	2014	T.I., Young Thug	G.D.O.D. II	AudioKlique	
"Real Nigga's Only"	2014	Doe B, B.o.B, T.I.	G.D.O.D. II	none	
"Make Me Somethin'"	2014	Rich Homie Quan, T.I., Young Dro, Spodee, Shad da God	G.D.O.D. II	AudioKlique	
"Puttin' In Work"	2014	Mitchelle'l, Trae, Young Dro, Doe B, 5Mics, Yung Booke	G.D.O.D. II	none	
"Check"	2014	T.I., Problem, Young Dro, Trae	G.D.O.D. II	none	
"Money Money Money"	2014	Kap G	LA Leakers & LRG Presents: Leaks of the Industry '14	none	
"Nothing to Lose"	2014	Spodee, Doe B, Yung Booke, Shad da God	The B.I.D.	Mars	
"Off-Set"	2015	T.I., Young Thug	Furious 7 (Original Motion Picture Soundtrack)	none	
"Spillin Drank"	2015	Mitchelle'l	—N/a	none	
"I Know"	2015	DJ Frank White, Young Dro	Cold World	AudioKlique	
"Black History"	2015	Young Dro	Da Reality Show	AudioKlique	
"Coupe"	2015	Young Dro	Da Reality Show	AudioKlique	
"Power"	2015	Young Dro, Hollywood Luck	Da Reality Show	AudioKlique	
"Rolls Royce Weather Everyday"	2016	2 Chainz, Lil Wayne	ColleGrove		
"I Want Her"	2016	Bankroll Mafia, Shad da God, T.I., 21 Savage, Young Thug, Duke	Bankroll Mafia	Mars	
"Light Show"	2016	5ive Mics	MMC		
"Can I"	2016	DJ Drama, Young Thug, T.I.	Quality Street Music 2		
"When the Going Gets Tough"	2017	T.I.	SpongeBob SquarePants: Original Cast Recording		
"Lesson Learned"	2020	Yung Baby Tate	After the Rain		
"Cold"	2020	Yung Baby Tate	After the Rain		
"Dos Mil 16"	2022	Bad Bunny	Un Verano Sin Ti	MAG, La Paciencia, MXV	
"Double R Dreamin"	2023	Lecrae, Urstrulyxyz	Church Clothes 4: Dry Clean Only	Luke Crowder, Cody Hao Duan, Heath Jackson	
"Can You Hear Me Now?"	2023	Lecrae, D Smoke	Church Clothes 4: Dry Clean Only	Luke Crowder, Mike & Keys, Classified Alias	
