= G.D.O.D. (Get Dough or Die) =

Mixtape series by Grand Hustle Records

G.D.O.D. (Get Dough or Die) is a series of compilation mixtapes released by American hip-hop and R&B record label Grand Hustle Records, under the namesake Hustle Gang. The first installment in the series was released on May 7, 2013.

== G.D.O.D. (Get Dough or Die) ==
G.D.O.D. (Get Dough Or Die)

Compilation album / mixtape by Hustle Gang
- Released: May 7, 2013
- Recorded: 2012–2013
- Genre: Hip-hop
- Label: Grand Hustle Records
- Producers: Stroud; The Superiors; Sarah J; B.o.B; FKi; DJ Spinz; K.E. on the Track; Young Chop; Lil' C; Cardo; Chuck Diesel; The Smash Factory; Certified Trunk Bangers; Nard & B; Travis Scott; Osinachi; Tommy Brown; Trap Beats; David Banner

Hustle Gang chronology
Grand Hustle Presents: In da Streetz Volume 4 (2006)	G.D.O.D. (Get Dough Or Die) (2013)	G.D.O.D. II (2014)

Singles from G.D.O.D. (Get Dough or Die)
- 1. "Problems" Released: July 11, 2013; 2. "Poppin' 4 Sum" Released: July 11, 2013; 3. "Kemosabe" Released: August 11, 2013; 4. "Here I Go" Released: September 10, 2013

G.D.O.D. (Get Dough or Die) is the debut mixtape by American record label Grand Hustle Records under the group name Hustle Gang. The mixtape was released as a free digital download on May 7, 2013 on mixtape hosting websites. The mixtape features contributions from Grand Hustle artists T.I., Mitchelle'l, B.o.B, Young Dro, Iggy Azalea, Doe B, Big Kuntry King, Trae tha Truth, D.O.P.E., Travi$ Scott, Chip, Kris Stephens, Mac Boney, and Shad da God. It also features guest appearances from Lil Duval, Juicy J, Meek Mill, Mystikal, French Montana, and Young Jeezy.

=== Background ===
In January 2013, B.o.B announced an upcoming Grand Hustle compilation album titled Hustle Gang. On April 4, T.I. revealed the label would release a mixtape titled, G.D.O.D (Get Dough or Die), during the first week of May 2013, preceding the compilation album. On April 19, 2013, T.I. formally introduced GOOD Music producer Travis Scott and Grammy Award winning songwriter Kris Stephens, as Grand Hustle signees. On April 28, a release date for the mixtape would later be announced to be May 7, 2013. As promised the mixtape was released on May 7, featuring 20 tracks and contributions from Grand Hustle artists T.I., Mitchelle'l, B.o.B, Young Dro, Big Kuntry King, Trae tha Truth, D.O.P.E., Travi$ Scott, Chip, Kris Stephens, Mac Boney, Doe B and Shad da God. It also featured guest appearances from Lil Duval, Juicy J, Iggy Azalea, Meek Mill, Mystikal, French Montana, and Young Jeezy.

=== Release and promotion ===
On May 4, 2013, T.I. appeared on BET's 106 & Park, alongside B.o.B, Young Dro, Trae tha Truth, and Kris Stephens, to promote the mixtape and premiere the "Memories Back Then" music video. On July 11, 2013, two songs from G.D.O.D. (Get Dough Or Die) were released to iTunes; "Problems" featuring T.I., B.o.B, Problem, Trae tha Truth, Mac Boney and Young Dro, along with "Poppin' 4 Sum", featuring Young Dro, B.o.B and Yung Brooke. On August 11, "Kemosabe", another song from the mixtape, featuring Doe B, T.I., B.o.B, Birdman and Young Dro, was released to iTunes. On August 29, 2013, the mixtape was released for retail sale on iTunes. On September 10, 2013, "Here I Go" by Spodee featuring T.I., Mystikal, Young Dro and Shad Da God, was released as the mixtape's fourth single.

=== Critical reception ===
Professional ratings
Review scores
Source	Rating
BET	3/5 stars
XXL	4/5 (XL)

G.D.O.D. (Get Dough Or Die) was met with generally positive reviews from music critics. Jesse Fairfax of HipHopDX deemed the mixtape a "free album", their highest praise for mixtapes. He also said, "Throwing his hat in the ring to compete with compilations from well received rosters such as G.O.O.D. Music and Rick Ross' MMG brand, T.I.'s Hustle Gang sets themselves apart from the run of the mill mixape mob with G.D.O.D. The squad proves to be generally captivating, making fully developed songs despite predictable mentions of the fashionable drug molly and the project's countless boasts of materialistic wealth. Responding to the urgency of their motto's acronym, most of the heavy lifting is handled by T.I., B.o.B. who cuts loose as a tough spitter outside of his pop lane, and the still razor sharp one hit wonder Young Dro."

NMB of XXL also gave a very positive review saying, " The sheer volume of verses squeezed into this mixtape keeps G.D.O.D. from ever really getting boring and it's exciting to see everyone seize their spots. Altogether it's a project that not only bodes well for Tip as an artist, but as a cultivator of talent as well." Calvin Stovall of BET stated, "by his own admission, money has clearly clouded T.I.'s artistic vision, watering down the trap sound he helped pioneer. At times Get Dough or Die is reminiscent of the glory days of his Pimp Squad Clique, with Tip occasionally kicking up and hitting his stride with one of his trademark accelerated flows. But for the most part, the tape is merely a disappointing reminder that money stacks does not a throne make."

=== Track listing ===
No.	Title	Producer(s)	Length
1.	"Intro" (Mitchelle'l & T.I.)	Stroud	1:31
2.	"Err-Body" (T.I., Young Dro, Trae Tha Truth, Chip, B.o.B & Shad da God)	The Superiors; Sarah J	6:25
3.	"LiL Duval Speaks"		1:02
4.	"2 Fucks" (T.I., Chip, B.o.B, Travi$ Scott, Trae Tha Truth & Young Dro)	FKi	5:15
5.	"Poppin 4 Sum" (Young Dro, Yung Booke & B.o.B)	DJ Spinz	3:49
6.	"Kemosabe" (Doe B, Young Dro, B.o.B & T.I.)	K.E. on the Track	4:45
7.	"Blocka" (Young Dro, T.I., Meek Mill & French Montana)	Young Chop	5:09
8.	"G.D.O.D." (T.I., Yung Booke, Doe B & Big Kuntry King)	Chuck Diesel	4:17
9.	"Problems" (B.o.B, T.I., Mac Boney, Problem, Trae Tha Truth & Young Dro)	B.o.B	7:39
10.	"Here I Go" (Young Dro, Shad Da God, T.I., Spodee & Mystikal)	Lil' C; FKi	5:10
11.	"Only N Atlanta" (Young Jeezy, Shad Da God & T.I.)	Cardo	4:18
12.	"Real Niggas" (Doe B, Shad Da God, Yung Booke & Big Kuntry King)	Stroud	4:57
13.	"Yeap!" (T.I., B.o.B, Young Dro & Trae Tha Truth)	The Smash Factory	4:41
14.	"Different Life" (B.o.B, T.I. & Young Dro)	Osinachi	3:46
15.	"Spodee Live From Rice Street"		3:41
16.	"Away" (Spodee, Trae Tha Truth & T.I.)	Nard & B	4:26
17.	"Animal" (Travi$ Scott, B.o.B & T.I.)	Tommy Brown; Travi$ Scott	4:14
18.	"Let Me Find Out (Remix)" (Doe B, T.I. & Juicy J)	Trap Beats	4:49
19.	"Man Down" (Yung Booke, T.I. & Young Dro)	Stroud	4:47
20.	"Chasin Me" (Iggy Azalea, T.I., Young Dro & Kris Stephens)	David Banner	3:56

== G.D.O.D. II ==
G.D.O.D II

Compilation album / mixtape by Hustle Gang
- Released: September 19, 2014
- Recorded: 2014
- Genre: Hip-hop
- Label: Grand Hustle Records
- Producers: Polow da Don; The Democratz; The MeKanics; DJ Dahi; StreetRunner; Watch The Duck; Dun Deal; Painkillers; The Superiors; Diplo; JMIKE; Tommy Brown; Zaytoven; B.o.B; K.E. on the Track; Lil' C; AudioKlique

Hustle Gang chronology
G.D.O.D. (Get Dough or Die) (2013)	G.D.O.D II (2014)	We Want Smoke (2017)

G.D.O.D. II is the second mixtape by American record label Grand Hustle Records under the group name Hustle Gang. The mixtape was released as a free digital download on September 19, 2014, via mixtape hosting websites. The mixtape features contributions from Grand Hustle artists T.I., Mitchelle'l, B.o.B, Young Dro, Doe B, Big Kuntry King, Trae tha Truth, D.O.P.E., Travi$ Scott, Chip, Kris Stephens, Mac Boney, Shad da God and Troy Ave. It also features guest appearances from Iggy Azalea, Meek Mill, Rich Homie Quan, Young Thug, Trey Songz, Watch The Duck and Yo Gotti among others.

=== Background ===
In August 2014, in an interview with MTV, T.I. revealed plans to release the Grand Hustle compilation, which is tentatively due in December, following his ninth album Paperwork: "What's holding up the Hustle Gang project is that we have some new additions to the mix, and we didn't wanna put out the project out without including or allowing those new additions to be part of it. Maybe we'll do a stroke of midnight release on New Years. We did that with F**k Da City Up and it did well, so maybe we'll try that again." On September 19, 2014, the label released the second installment to the G.D.O.D. (Get Dough or Die) series.

=== Track listing ===
No.	Title	Producer(s)	Length
1.	"Welcome To My City" (T.I., Doe B, Shad Da God & Spodee)	Polow Da Don	4:22
2.	"Who We Is (OG)" (Doe B, T.I., Spodee, Trae Tha Truth & Dro)	The Democratz	5:33
3.	"Brand New Choppa" (Travis Scott, Meek Mill, T.I., Booke & Dro)	The MeKanics	4:41
4.	"I Need War" (T.I. & Young Thug)	Lil' C; AudioKlique	3:22
5.	"Money On My Mind" (Troy Ave, Spodee, Booke & T.I.)	DJ Dahi; StreetRunner	5:18
6.	"By Any Means (God Damnt)" (Watch The Duck, T.I., Shad Da God & Spodee)	Watch The Duck	4:32
7.	"UM HMM" (Spodee, T.I. & Yo Gotti)	The Democratz	4:54
8.	"Real Nigga's Only" (Doe B, B.o.B & T.I.)	Lil' C	3:45
9.	"What You Gon' Do Bout It" (Zuse, T.I., Trae Tha Truth & Spodee)	Dun Deal; Lil' C; AudioKlique	4:39
10.	"Ain't Both (MLK)" (T.I., Trae Tha Truth, Dro, Spodee & Doe B)	Painkillers	5:43
11.	"I Do The Most" (Booke, T.I., Dro, Spodee & Shad Da God)	The Superiors	4:41
12.	"We Go Hard" (Iggy Azalea, T.I. & Spodee)	Diplo; JMIKE	3:20
13.	"Champagne Room" (Trey Songz, B.o.B, T.I., Big Kuntry King & Spodee)	B.o.B	5:12
14.	"Ya Digg" (Shad Da God, Travis Scott, Spodee & T.I.)	Tommy Brown	4:26
15.	"Make Me Somethin" (Rich Homie Quan, T.I., Dro, Spodee & Shad Da God)	Lil' C; AudioKlique	4:38
16.	"I Don't Fuck Wit You" (B.o.B, T.I., Spodee, Booke, Shad Da God & Big Kuntry King)	Zaytoven; Dun Deal	3:42
17.	"Troubled" (B.o.B, Watch The Duck, T.I. & Dro)	B.o.B	3:46
18.	"You Don't Know Nothin About Me" (Doe B, Trae Tha Truth & T.I.)	K.E. on the Track	3:47
19.	"Puttin' in Work" (Mitchelle'l, Trae Tha Truth, Dro, Doe B, 5Mics & Booke)	Lil' C	4:30
20.	"Check" (T.I., Problem, Dro & Trae Tha Truth)	Lil' C	3:45
