= Grand Hustle Presents: In da Streetz Volume 4 =

Compilation album by Grand Hustle
- Released: December 19, 2006
- Recorded: 2005–2006
- Genre: Hip-hop
- Length: 57:21
- Label: Grand Hustle, Atlantic
- Producer: Clifford "T.I." Harris Jr. (exec.), Jason Geter (exec.), Khao, Lil' C, Keith Mack, Marvelous J, Mannie Fresh, Scott Storch, Cyber Sapp, Nitti, Rashad Morgan, Dirty Bird

Grand Hustle chronology
Grand Hustle Presents: In da Streetz Volume 4 (2006)	G.D.O.D. (Get Dough or Die) (2013)

Singles from Grand Hustle Presents: In da Streetz Volume 4
- 1. "Tell 'Em What They Wanna Hear" Released: May 23, 2006; 2. "Top Back (Remix)" Released: December 12, 2006

Professional ratings
Review scores
Source	Rating
Allmusic	3/5 stars
Rolling Stone	3/5 stars

Grand Hustle Presents: In da Streetz Volume 4 is a hip-hop compilation album by recording artists of American record label Grand Hustle, founded by rapper T.I. The album was released on December 19, 2006, under Grand Hustle and Atlantic Records.

The album features contributions from several Grand Hustle recording artists, including Big Kuntry King, P$C, Young Dro, Governor, Rashad Morgan and Xtaci, as well as guest appearances from southern rappers B.G., Young Jeezy and Yung Joc. The album's production was mainly handled by Grand Hustle in-house producers such as Khao, Lil' C and Keith Mack, with contributions also coming from high-profile producers Mannie Fresh, Scott Storch, Cyber Sapp and Nitti.

The Grand Hustle compilation album, which is the first of the In da Streets series to be officially released to music retailers (as the previous three installments were only mixtapes), produced two singles. The first single released was "Tell 'Em What They Wanna Hear", a song by American singer-songwriter and record producer Rashad Morgan, featuring T.I. and Young Dro. The compilation's second single is the remix to T.I.'s King album cut, "Top Back". The song, produced by Mannie Fresh, features T.I. rapping alongside Young Jeezy, Young Dro, B.G. and Big Kuntry King.

== Track listing ==
No.	Title	Producer(s)	Length
1.	"Top Back (Remix)" (T.I. featuring Young Jeezy, Young Dro, Big Kuntry King and B.G.)	Mannie Fresh	4:32
2.	"Grand Hustle Mafia" (Young Dro)	Khao	4:41
3.	"Work" (Mac Boney)	Cyber Sapp	4:04
4.	"Yeah (Remix)" (Big Kuntry King featuring Yung Joc and T.I.)	Marvelous J	4:35
5.	"Take Me to the Mall" (Xtaci)	Marvelous J	3:32
6.	"Da One" (Alfamega)	Brandon "Dirty Bird" Parriot	2:47
7.	"Where They At" (T.I.)	Nitti	3:15
8.	"Fuck Being Famous" (Big Kuntry King featuring B.G.)	Keith Mack	4:31
9.	"I'm Out Here" (B.G.)	Keith Mack	4:06
10.	"Who You Callin' a Bitch" (Xtaci)	Lil' C	3:50
11.	"My Girl" (Young Dro featuring T.I.)	Lil' C	5:22
12.	"Grand Hustle Beatmaker"	Khao	4:07
13.	"Tell 'Em What They Wanna Hear" (Rashad Morgan featuring T.I. and Young Dro)	Rashad Morgan	3:34
14.	"Destiny" (Governor)	Scott Storch	4:25
