= Rubberband Banks =

Single by Young Dro

from the album Best Thang Smokin'
- Released: August 11, 2006
- Genre: Hip hop
- Length: 4:49
- Label: Grand Hustle; Atlantic Records
- Songwriter(s): D'Juan Hart; Cordale Quinn
- Producer(s): Lil' C

Young Dro singles chronology
"Shoulder Lean" (2006)	"Rubberband Banks" (2006)	"Top Back Remix" (2006)

"Rubberband Banks" is a song by American hip hop recording artist Young Dro, released as the second single from his debut studio album Best Thang Smokin' (2006). The song, like its predecessor, was produced by Grand Hustle in-house producer Cordale "Lil' C" Quinn. The song's title refers to the act of storing large quantities of banknotes using rubber bands.

== Reception ==
Andres Tardio of HipHopDX considered "Rubberband Banks" too similar to "Rubber Band Man" by Young Dro's mentor T.I., highlighting the song as an example of what he perceived to be Young Dro's lack of musical identity on Best Thang Smokin': "...in the end, he doesn’t differentiate himself from the pack". Steve Juon of RapReviews wrote critically of the song's lyrics and Young Dro's writing abilities, arguing that "normally criticizing a rapper's punchlines one would note that they are either far too commonly used or lazy in execution, but in Young Dro's case it's almost like he's trying too hard. "Shorty say she want Dro, I think she want an ounce of me." C'mon, that's not even funny." In contrast, David Jeffries of AllMusic praised "Rubberband Banks" as "snide and loopy like the Grand Hustle team almost always nails"; in an otherwise mixed review of Best Thang Smokin', Clover Hope of Billboard wrote that Young Dro "flexes his creativity" on "Rubberband Banks", singling out the lyric "Diamonds look like passion fruit" as showing how Young Dro's "originality lies more in his odd food-obsessed rhymes... than in his lyrical content or flow, which he rarely alters".

== Charts ==
Chart (2006)	Peak position
US Bubbling Under Hot 100 Singles (Billboard)	2
US Hot R&B/Hip-Hop Songs (Billboard)	44
US Hot Rap Songs (Billboard)	23

== Release history ==
Region	Date	Format(s)	Label(s)	Ref.
United States	August 15, 2006	12-inch vinyl	Atlantic	
United States	October 16, 2006	Rhythmic contemporary radio	Atlantic	
