= Best Thang Smokin' =

Studio album by Young Dro
- Released: August 29, 2006
- Genre: Hip-hop
- Length: 60:07
- Labels: Grand Hustle; Atlantic
- Producers: T.I. (exec.); Lil' C; Nitti; Khao; Jazze Pha; Keith Mack; Big Reese; Develop; Chad West; P-No

Young Dro chronology
I Got That Dro (2001)	Best Thang Smokin' (2006)	High Times (2013)

Singles from Best Thang Smokin'
- 1. "Shoulder Lean" Released: May 2, 2006; 2. "Rubberband Banks" Released: 2006

Best Thang Smokin' is the commercial debut and second studio album by American rapper Young Dro. It was released on August 29, 2006, by Grand Hustle Records and Atlantic Records. Best Thang Smokin' serves as Dro's commercial debut, following his independent album, I Got That Dro (2001).

The album's production was handled by several high-profile record producers, such as Jazze Pha, Nitti and Develop, as well as Grand Hustle in-house producers Lil' C, Khao and Keith Mack. The Atlantic debut also features guest appearances from Slim Thug, T.I. and Xtaci. The album was supported by two singles, "Shoulder Lean" and "Rubberband Banks", the former of which went on to become a hit single.

He dropped a music video to his song "Gangsta" on October 20th, 2026. A little over 20 years after the initial album release.

A music video to "Presidential" was released on October 29th, 2026.

== Track listing ==
No.	Title	Writer(s)	Producer(s)	Length
1.	"Shoulder Lean" (featuring T.I.)	Hart; Clifford Harris; Cordale Quinn	Lil' C	4:20
2.	"Man in the Trunk"	Hart; Chadron Moore	Nitti	4:28
3.	"Presidential"	Hart; Cates	Khao	4:05
4.	"They Don't Really Know Bout Dro"	D'Juan Hart; Kevin Cates	Kevin "Khao" Cates	4:09
5.	"U Don't See Me" (featuring Slim Thug)	Hart; Phalon Alexander; Stayve Thomas	Jazze Pha	4:38
6.	"Rubberband Banks"	Hart; Quinn	Lil' C	4:49
7.	"We Lied"	Hart; Keith McMasters	Keith Mack	4:14
8.	"My Girl" (featuring T.I.)	Hart; Quinn; Harris	Lil' C	5:22
9.	"100 Yard Dash" (featuring Xtaci)	Hart; Jennifer Willis; Bola Akanni; Bigram Zayas	Develop	2:59
10.	"Hear Me Cry"	Hart; Chad Hamilton; Rick James	Chad West	4:04
11.	"Gangsta"	Hart; Quinn	Lil' C	4:53
12.	"High Five"	Hart; Delarmon Harold	P-No	3:52
13.	"Fresh"	Hart; Alexander	Jazze Pha	4:22
14.	"What It Is"	Hart; Alexander	Jazze Pha	3:47
15.	"It Ain't Over"	Hart; Maurice Sinclair	Big Reese	4:47

iTunes bonus track
No.	Title	Producer(s)	Length
16.	"Cartoon"	P-No	3:51

Sample credits

- "Hear Me Cry" contains samples of "Hollywood", performed and written by Rick James.

== Chart positions ==
=== Weekly charts ===
Chart (2006)	Peak position
US Billboard 200	3
US Top R&B/Hip-Hop Albums (Billboard)	1

=== Year-end charts ===
Chart (2006)	Position
US Top R&B/Hip-Hop Albums (Billboard)	61
