= We Want Smoke =

Compilation album by Hustle Gang
- Released: October 13, 2017
- Recorded: 2015–17
- Genre: Hip-hop
- Length: 63:47
- Labels: Grand Hustle; Roc Nation
- Producers: Tip "T.I." Harris (exec.); Doug Peterson (exec.); 30 Roc; AdoTheGod; Ben Wagu; Brandon Rossi; Dave O; DJ Money; Stroud; J Cash; J. Wells; Lex Luger; Mitch Mula; Nottz; RaRa; SKUFL; S Dot; Sho Nuff; The Supersonics; Trev Case; Turbo; Wheezy

Hustle Gang chronology
G.D.O.D. II (2014)	We Want Smoke (2017)

Singles from We Want Smoke
- 1. "Game 7" Released: June 28, 2017; 2. "Do No Wrong" Released: July 21, 2017; 3. "Friends" Released: September 8, 2017

Back cover

Professional ratings
Review scores
Source	Rating
HipHopDX	3.8/5 stars

Hustle Gang Presents We Want Smoke, commonly referred to as We Want Smoke, is a compilation album by recording artists of American record label Grand Hustle Records, released under the namesake Hustle Gang. The compilation was issued on October 13, 2017, by the label, under exclusive license to Roc Nation. American rapper T.I., head of the label, first revealed plans for a label collaborative album in 2013. The compilation produced three singles—"Game 7", "Do No Wrong" and "Friends".

The album features appearances from T.I. himself, along Grand Hustle signees B.o.B, London Jae, Tokyo Jetz, Translee, Yung Booke, RaRa, Young Dro, Trae tha Truth, Brandon Rossi, 5ive Mics and GFMBRYYCE. The production on the album was handled by 30 Roc, Stroud, J. Wells, Lex Luger, Nottz, Sho Nuff, Trev Case and Wheezy, among others. The album is dedicated to T.I.'s deceased friends and associates Big Phil, Peanut da Don and Doe B.

== Background ==
In March 2013, T.I. revealed plans to release a compilation album showcasing the artists on his Grand Hustle label. In April 2013, Grand Hustle released the intended first single for the album; the song, titled "Memories Back Then", features T.I. and B.o.B alongside Kendrick Lamar and Kris Stephens. On April 4, 2013, T.I. revealed the label would release a mixtape titled G.D.O.D. (Get Dough or Die), during the first week of May 2013, which would precede the compilation album. The mixtape was released on May 7, featuring 20 tracks and contributions from Grand Hustle artists T.I., Mitchelle'l, B.o.B, Young Dro, Big Kuntry King, Trae tha Truth, D.O.P.E., Travis Scott, Chip, Kris Stephens, Mac Boney, Doe B and Shad da God.

In an August 2014 interview with MTV, T.I. revealed plans to release the Grand Hustle compilation in December, following his ninth solo album Paperwork: "What's holding up the Hustle Gang project is that we have some new additions to the mix, and we didn't wanna put out the project out without including or allowing those new additions to be part of it. Maybe we'll do a stroke of midnight release on New Years. We did that with Fuck da City Up and it did well, so maybe we'll try that again." On September 19, 2014, the label released the second installment to their G.D.O.D. (Get Dough or Die) series, titled G.D.O.D. II. Aside from Grand Hustle recording artists, the mixtape features additional appearances from Iggy Azalea, Meek Mill, Young Thug, Troy Ave, Watch The Duck, Yo Gotti, Trey Songz and Rich Homie Quan, among others. On September 19, 2016, Grand Hustle released the mixtape H.G.O.E. (Hustle Gang Over Errrrythang), featuring guest appearances from Young Thug, Chocolate Droppa, Future, Migos, Lotto Savage, Shad da God, Kap G and more.

In April 2017, American rappers 5ive Mics, Tokyo Jetz, RaRa, Translee and London Jae, were all revealed to be new members of the Grand Hustle roster.

== Release and promotion ==
On March 15, 2017, T.I. announced the Hustle Gang concert tour. The Grand Hustle tour began on April 26 in Mobile, Alabama, going through 36 shows across the country before they wrapped up on June 11 in Jacksonville, Florida. In late March, Hustle Gang hosted an after-hours brunch and vibe event, at South by Southwest (SXSW), titled The Hustle Gang Experience, powered by Beer N Tacos & Chariot. Headed by T.I. and Trae Tha Truth, the showcase gave a platform for the new Hustle Gang roster to show their skills. The night kicked off with a performance by T.I.'s son, Domani Harris, with music from his recently released project Constellation, followed by RaRa with songs such as "FWM" off his debut project I Am What I Am. Tokyo Jetz went on to perform her viral hit "DM", Yung Booke and London Jae performed "H.I.T.V." and finishing with Trae Tha Truth performing records like "Swangin" and new music from T.I.'s forthcoming album.

On June 27, 2017, HotNewHipHop interviewed Grand Hustle artists, where they discussed their compilation project and how they all met T.I. On June 28, 2017, a song titled "Game 7" was released as the first single from Grand Hustle's compilation album We Want Smoke. The song features verses from T.I., RaRa and Rossi. The album's second single "Do No Wrong", was released in July and features verses from GFMBRYYCE, Young Dro and T.I. The album's third single "Friends", was released with an accompanying music video, on September 8. "Friends" features Hustle Gang rappers T.I., RaRa, Brandon Rossi, Tokyo Jetz, Trae tha Truth and Young Dro. On September 27, Hustle Gang appeared on the 107 Jamz radio show with Big Boy Chill, where they spoke on the compilation album. On September 29, 2017, T.I. unveiled the compilation's album cover art and revealed the track-listing. The album was also made available for pre-order the same day.

== Track listing ==
We Want Smoke
No.	Title	Writer(s)	Producer(s)	Length
1.	"Want Smoke" (featuring London Jae, Yung Booke, Young Dro and T.I.)	Clifford Harris; Jacquez Lowe; Kedral Long; Djuan Hart; Dominique Mitchell	Mitch Mula	4:22
2.	"Friends" (featuring T.I., RaRa, Brandon Rossi, Tokyo Jetz, Trae tha Truth and Young Dro)	C. Harris; Rodriqueiz Smith; Brandon Rossi; Shauntrell Pender; Hart; Frazier Thompson; Lowe; Widnick Prevalon	RaRa; SKUFL	4:05
3.	"Game 7" (featuring T.I., Brandon Rossi and RaRa)	Rossi; Smith; Albert Brown III; D. De Grate; C. Harris	RaRa; Brandon Rossi; The Supersonics	3:31
4.	"That Bag" (featuring Young Thug, T.I., Young Dro and Trev Case)	C. Harris; Hart; Trevor Case; Jeffery Williams	Trev Case	3:50
5.	"Trappin' on Forgis" (featuring T.I., Lex, Trae tha Truth and London Jae)	C. Harris; Alexander Contreras; Thompson; Lowe; Alexander Lipinski; David Grear	Dave O; AdoTheGod	4:04
6.	"Go Off" (featuring B.o.B, T.I., Yung Booke, Tokyo Jetz, Trae tha Truth and Young Dro)	C. Harris; Bobby Simmons; Long; Pender; Thompson; Lowe; Shomari Wilson	Sho Nuff	3:40
7.	"So High" (featuring Peanut da Don, London Jae, Young Dro and T.I.)	C. Harris; Hart; Lowe; Adam Williams; Dominic Lamb; Thomas Brenneck; Lee Fields; Leon Michels; Toby Pazner; Jeffrey Silverman; Homer Steinweiss	Nottz	3:28
8.	"Gateway" (featuring Translee, Yung Booke, Tokyo Jetz and Ink)	Translee Macklin; Hart; Pender; Long; Atia Boggs; Chandler Durham; Wesley Glass	Turbo; Wheezy	3:32
9.	"My Block" (featuring T.I., London Jae, Young Dro, B.o.B and 5ive Mics)	C. Harris; Hart; Simmons; Lowe; Anthony Strong; Samuel Gloade	30 Roc	3:14
10.	"Do No Wrong" (featuring GFMBRYYCE, Young Dro and T.I.)	C. Harris; Hart; Bryce Harris; J. Wells; James Sayles; Stephon Wimberly; Antonio Amabili; Lupicínio Rodrigues	J. Wells; J Cash; S Dot	4:05
11.	"Still Young" (featuring B.o.B, Translee and T.I.)	C. Harris; Simmons; Macklin; Durham	Turbo	3:38
12.	"Talk My Shit" (featuring Peanut da Don, Trae tha Truth and Young Dro)	Hart; Thompson; A. Williams; Elliot Stroud	Stroud	2:58
13.	"Who Gone Check Me" (featuring GFMBRYYCE, Translee, Yung Booke, Young Dro and T.I.)	C. Harris; Macklin; Hart; B. Harris; Long; Durham	Turbo	4:06
14.	"Sometimes" (featuring T.I. and Young Dro)	C. Harris; Hart; Smith	RaRa	3:37
15.	"Weight" (featuring Translee, Trae tha Truth, Kim Minnis, Tokyo Jetz and Young Dro)	Thompson; Macklin; Kim Minnis; Pender; Hart; Benjamin Wogu; Eliza Hull; Tim Gordine	Ben Wogu	4:08
16.	"Roll the Dice" (featuring RaRa, GFMBRYYCE, Translee and Brandon Rossi)	Macklin; Smith; B. Harris; Rossi; Lexus Lewis	Lex Luger	2:43
17.	"Trenches Reloaded" (featuring Peanut da Don and T.I.)	C. Harris; A. Williams; Courtney Green	DJ Money	4:46
Total length:				63:47

Sample credits

- "Game 7" contains elements from "Forever My Lady" performed by Jodeci, written by Albert Joseph Brown III and Donald DeGrate.
- "So High" contains elements from "Ladies" performed by Lee Fields.
- "My Block" contains a sample from "Have You Been Tried In The Fire" performed by Florida Mass Choir, written by Milton Biggham.
- "Do No Wrong" contains elements from "Cevando o Amargo" written by Lupicínio Rodrigues and performed by Adriana Calcanhotto.
- "Weight" contains elements from "Christopher" performed by Eliza Hull, written by Tim Gordine and Eliza Hull.
