= Bankroll Mafia (album) =

Studio album by Bankroll Mafia
- Released: April 22, 2016
- Recorded: 2015–16
- Genre: Hip hop
- Length: 70:00
- Label: Grand Hustle; Empire
- Producer: Brackz; D. Rich; Dave Kuncio; Goose; Isaac Flame; Jazzfeezy; Lil' C; London on da Track; Mars; Scena; Steve Samson; Turbo; Wheezy

Singles from Bankroll Mafia
- 1. "Bankrolls on Deck" Released: July 20, 2015; 2. "Out My Face" Released: January 2, 2016

Professional ratings
Review scores
Source	Rating
HipHopDX	3.8 stars on a 5 point scale
HotNewHipHop	8/10 stars
XXL	3/5 stars

Bankroll Mafia is the eponymously titled debut studio album by American hip hop collective Bankroll Mafia, composed of American rappers T.I., Young Thug, Shad da God, PeeWee Roscoe, Lil Duke and London Jae. The album was issued on April 22, 2016, via Grand Hustle Records and Empire Distribution. The album features guest appearances from fellow Atlanta-based rappers Bankroll Fresh, Young Dro, Lil Yachty, 21 Savage and Yung Booke, as well as Quavo and Offset. The album was supported by two singles, "Bankrolls on Deck" and "Out My Face".

== Singles ==
"Bankrolls on Deck", which features verses from T.I.P., Young Thug, Shad da God and PeeWee Roscoe, was released July 20, 2015 as the album's first single. The official music video for "Bankrolls on Deck", directed by Kennedy Rothchild, was released prior on July 18. The album's second single, "Out My Face", showcasing members T.I.P., Shad da God, Young Thug and London Jae, was released January 2, 2016. The music video for "Out My Face" was released on April 18, 2016.

== Track listing ==
No.	Title	Producer(s)	Length
1.	"Hyenas" (featuring Young Thug, T.I.P., Shad da God, Lil Yachty and Lil Duke)	Jazzfeezy; Steve Samson	3:40
2.	"Fuck This Shit Up" (featuring Bankroll Fresh, PeeWee Roscoe, Shad da God and T.I.P.)	D. Rich	5:16
3.	"Out My Face" (featuring London Jae, Shad da God, T.I.P. and Young Thug)	Isaac Flame; Goose	3:28
4.	"I Want Her" (featuring 21 Savage, Young Thug, Lil Duke, Shad da God and T.I.P.)	Lil' C; Mars; Dave Kuncio	4:00
5.	"What Money About" (featuring Chi Chi, MoneyBag and Shad da God)	Turbo	3:56
6.	"Neg 4 Degrees" (featuring Young Thug, Lil Duke and Shad da God)	Wheezy	3:42
7.	"Trenches" (featuring T.I.P., London Jae and Shad da God)	Brackz	3:31
8.	"My Bros" (featuring Lil Duke, Shad da God and Yung Booke)	Wheezy	3:14
9.	"Up One" (featuring Shad da God, Offset and Quavo)	Wheezy	4:59
10.	"No Color" (featuring T.I.P., PeeWee Roscoe and Shad da God)	Jazzfeezy; Steve Samson	4:52
11.	"Screwed It Up" (featuring London Jae, Shad da God and T.I.P.)	London on da Track	4:07
12.	"Cash" (featuring London Jae, T.I.P., Young Thug and Young Dro)	Mars	4:47
13.	"Smoke Tree" (featuring T.I.P., Shad da God and London Jae)	Wheezy	3:53
14.	"WCW" (featuring T.I.P., Young Thug, Shad da God and Lil Duke)	Wheezy	4:35
15.	"Hundreds on 'Em" (featuring Yung Booke, PeeWee Roscoe and Shad da God)	Jazzfeezy; Scena	4:15
16.	"Mafia, Mafia" (featuring T.I.P., Shad da God and PeeWee Roscoe)	Jazzfeezy; Steve Samson	2:38
17.	"Bankrolls on Deck" (featuring T.I.P., Young Thug, Shad da God and PeeWee Roscoe)	Wheezy	5:07
Total length:			70:00

== Charts ==
Chart (2016)	Peak position
US Heatseekers Albums (Billboard)	16
