= Bankroll Mafia =

American hip hop collective

- Origin: Bankhead, Atlanta, Georgia, U.S.
- Genres: Hip hop; trap
- Years active: 2015–present
- Labels: Bankroll Mafia LLC; EMPIRE; Grand Hustle
- Members: T.I.; Young Thug; Shad da God; Lil Duke; Peewee Roscoe; London Jae
- Website: www.bankrollmafia.life

Bankroll Mafia is an American hip hop collective from Atlanta, Georgia. The collective was formed in 2015, after American rappers T.I., Young Thug and Shad da God began frequently working together. Other Atlanta-based rappers also joined the collective, including Label No Genre’s London Jae, and Young Thug's close affiliates Peewee Roscoe and Lil Duke. In an interview with Billboard, T.I. described the group's dynamic as "a collective that includes a lot of personal and professional constituents throughout the industry, in and out of our elements." The collective released their self-titled debut album in April 2016.

== History ==
=== Background and formation ===
In 2009, T.I. signed Georgia-based hip hop group Rich Kids, to his label, Grand Hustle Records. After the group left the label in 2011, Rich Kids member Rich Kid Shawty stayed with the Grand Hustle imprint, subsequently appearing on T.I.'s mixtapes, Fuck a Mixtape (2010) and Fuck da City Up (2012). In 2012, Rich Kid Shawty changed his moniker to Rich Kid Shad and later Shad da God.

In 2014, T.I. began collaborating with up-and-coming Atlanta-based rapper Young Thug, who released his breakout single "Stoner", in February of that year. In June, the two released their first collaboration, "About the Money" from T.I.'s Paperwork (2014), which reached number 42 on the US Billboard Hot 100 chart. The two later went on to collaborate on several songs, namely "Off-Set" from Furious 7 (Original Motion Picture Soundtrack) (2015), "Can't Tell" from Barter 6 (2015) and "Can I" from Quality Street Music 2 (2016).

In 2009, Peewee Roscoe had appeared on T.I.'s MTV reality show, Road to Redemption, where T.I. hoped to encourage teenagers to avoid spending a life of crime by showing seven teenagers that there is another way. With help from T.I., Roscoe broke into the hip hop industry, eventually working with fellow Atlanta-based rapper Young Thug and becoming his road manager. In May 2015, Thug and Roscoe revealed they were no longer affiliated with Birdman's Rich Gang.

Lil Duke, also known as MPA Duke or simply Duke, is a former member of Peewee Longway's MPA BandCamp (Money Pounds Ammunition) and is also a part of Quality Control Music's roster, along with Migos and OG Maco, among others.

In June 2015, T.I. announced he was working on a project as part of the hip hop collective Bankroll Mafia, alongside Shad da God and Young Thug, among others. "It was kind of a natural progression,” T.I. said of the group's formation, noting that all the rappers had known each other for a while and had an abundance of material together already. “It was only right that we share this lifestyle with the rest of the world."

In November 2015, Peewee Roscoe was sentenced to 20 years in prison for allegedly shooting up New Orleans rapper Lil Wayne's tour bus. During a February 2016 interview with DJ Drama's Streetz Is Watchin’ Shade 45 radio show, T.I. proclaimed Roscoe's innocence, saying "I know, for one, [Roscoe] didn't do that."

The group independently released their self-titled debut studio album, Bankroll Mafia, on April 22, 2016 through Tidal and iTunes. The album was preceded by two singles and includes production from Jazzfeezy, D Rich, Issac Flame, Mars, Lil' C, Turbo, Wheezy, B Rackz, and London on da Track. Additionally, the album features guest appearances from Lil Yachty, Offset, Quavo, Bankroll Fresh, 21 Savage, and more. The album was met with generally positive reviews from critics.

== Discography ==
=== Studio albums ===
List of albums, with selected chart positions
| Title | Album details | Peak chart positions | | |
| Title | Album details | US | US R&B | US Rap |
|---|---|---|---|---|
| Bankroll Mafia | Released: April 22, 2016; Label: Bankroll Mafia LLC., Grand Hustle Records, Empire Distribution; Format: CD, digital download | — | — | — |
"—" denotes a title that did not chart, or was not released in that territory.

=== Singles ===
List of singles, showing year released with selected chart positions and album name
| Title | Year | Peak chart positions | | | Album |
| Title | Year | US | US R&B | US Rap | Album |
|---|---|---|---|---|---|
| "Bankrolls on Deck" (featuring T.I., Young Thug, Shad da God and Peewee Roscoe) | 2015 | — | — | — | Bankroll Mafia |
| "Out My Face" (featuring T.I., Shad da God, Young Thug and London Jae) | 2016 | — | — | — | Bankroll Mafia |
| "—" denotes a recording that did not chart or was not released in that territory. | | | | | Bankroll Mafia |

== Bankroll Mafia LLC. ==
=== Releases ===
- Shad da God - Gas Life (2013)
- Shad da God - 2000 and God (2015)
- Bankroll Mafia - Bankroll Mafia (2016)
- Shad da God - Free the Goat (2016)
- Shad da God - God Gang (2017)
- Shad Da God - City of God (2018)
