= Big Kuntry King =

American rapper (born 1978)

- Born: Sean Merrett; November 1, 1978 (age 47); Charleston, South Carolina, U.S.
- Origin: Atlanta, Georgia, U.S.
- Genres: Southern hip-hop
- Occupation: Rapper
- Years active: 1999–present
- Labels: Bread Box Cartel; Grand Hustle; Atlantic (former); Ghet-O-Vision (former)
- Website: www.bigkuntryking.com

Sean Merrett (born November 1, 1978), better known by his stage name Big Kuntry King, is an American rapper from Atlanta, Georgia. He is perhaps best known as a member of Southern hip hop group Pimp $quad Click, along with longtime friend and fellow Atlanta-based rapper T.I. After signing to T.I.'s Grand Hustle imprint, Big Kuntry King secured a recording contract with Atlantic Records. His debut studio album, My Turn to Eat, was released September 30, 2008.

Big Kuntry King is also the founder of his own record label imprint, Bread Box Muzic.

== Life and career ==
=== 1978–2007: Early life and career beginnings ===
Born in Charleston, South Carolina, Big Kuntry King was raised in a house that held his mother, sister, and close to ten members of his extended family. When he reached the fifth grade, Kuntry moved to Atlanta with his mother, who sought a better life for her kids. While his mom worked two jobs and pursued a community college degree, Kuntry gravitated to street life, where his family had a notorious history. "I was born in the game," says Kuntry. "My Grand Momma was in it before she died. My Auntie was in it; everybody was in it."

A couple of years after his father was released from a seven-year stint in federal prison, Kuntry started rapping as a way to earn extra money. In 1996, Kuntry befriended local up-and-coming rapper T.I., who was already known around Atlanta as a skilled lyricist, and together they sold mixtapes out the trunk of their car. "The raps, that was our dope," Kuntry says. "We was rapping because we knew we could make us enough money to buy something and get out. And it made us look good in our neighborhood and every other neighborhood in the A."

Big Kuntry King's first major feature spot came on T.I.'s debut studio album, I'm Serious (2001), on the song "Heavy Chevys." In between appearing on subsequent T.I. albums like Trap Muzik (2003) and Urban Legend (2004), Big Kuntry recorded and released several songs on his own, including "Still Country" and "Throwback." As a member of P$C, the Grand Hustle-signed five-man group released their debut album, 25 to Life, in 2005, which spawned the lead single, "I'm a King" featuring Lil' Scrappy. With the release of the P$C album, Big Kuntry was suddenly introduced to a nationwide audience but unfortunately for him, it wasn't his star that T.I. and Grand Hustle focused on making the brightest: "They had just signed Young Dro, and Tip made this song 'Shoulder Lean' for him, he threw some verses on it and it was a smash song. We was like damn, we've been here since day one killing it and you're going to come out with Young Dro? That's when I said man, I have to step this up."

In 2006, he was featured on the remix to T.I.'s "Top Back", also featuring Young Jeezy, Young Dro and B.G. The remix was included on the Grand Hustle compilation album Grand Hustle Presents: In da Streetz Volume 4 (2006).

=== 2008–present: My Turn to Eat ===
While T.I. and the rest of the camp were overseas playing shows in Japan, Kuntry was in the studio by himself recording solo material. It didn't take long for Kuntry to craft the catchy tracks, "Yeah I'm On It" and "That's Right," which both featured Kuntry's drawn out signature adlib, You know who this is man, Big Kuntry King!. "I took all of my money and pressed up the 'Yeah I'm On It' record," he says. "And by the time they came back from Japan, I had two records on the radio and playing in the clubs." Determined to succeed, Kuntry was signed as a solo artist to Atlantic Records, where he released his solo debut studio album, My Turn to Eat: "I always thought it was my turn to eat cause I'm hungry. All these people are eating more around me, so either I have to take some food off their plate."

After recording for close to a year, Kuntry's debut was a solid collection of songs produced by some of Atlanta's trend-setting track masters, including Shawty Redd and Marvelous J. On the song "Pots and Pans," Kuntry breaks down the difference between the music he was raised on Down South as opposed to what people up North were accustomed to hearing. On the Nard & B produced cut "Soul of a Man," Kuntry talks about the heavy expectations that are placed on men everyday, and the common struggle to always do the right thing. Kuntry's track "Posse" is all about repping where he's from and the company that he keeps: "If you listen to my album you're going to be rockin' the whole time," he says. "I hand-picked all of my beats and I'm very picky. A lot of people tell me I got an ear and I appreciate it 'cause this ear is going to get me paid." Cha-ching!". "I think my music is like Dr. Jekyll and Mr. Hyde," he says. "It's like, he's funny, he's cracking jokes but he's serious ain't he? It's a psychological thing; I don't think a lot of rappers are like that." The album, released September 30, 2008, debuted at #98 on the Billboard 200.

On February 27, 2012, Big Kuntry King released a mixtape titled 100% (KANE), including production from Zaytoven, Nard & B and Two Band Geeks and features a guest appearance from T.I. On December 12, 2012 Big Kuntry King released another mixtape, Dope & Champagne.

== Discography ==
=== Studio albums ===
List of albums, with selected chart positions
Title	Album details	Peak chart positions		
Title	Album details	US	US R&B	US Rap
My Turn to Eat	Release date: September 30, 2008; Label: Grand Hustle Records, Atlantic Records; Format: CD, digital download	98	13	7
TBA	Release date: TBA; Label: Bread Box Cartel, Grand Hustle Records, Entertainment One Music; Format: CD, digital download	TBR	TBR	TBR
"—" denotes a title that did not chart, or was not released in that territory.

=== Compilation albums ===
List of compilation albums, with selected chart positions
Title	Album details	Peak chart positions	
Title	Album details	US R&B	US Rap
Grand Hustle Presents: In da Streetz Volume 4 (with Grand Hustle)	Released: December 19, 2006; Label: Grand Hustle, Atlantic; Formats: CD, digital download	—	—
"—" denotes a title that did not chart, or was not released in that territory.

=== Mixtapes ===
List of mixtapes, with year released
Title	Album details
Cocaine	Released: February 10, 2006; Label: Grand Hustle; Format: Digital download
The Corporate Hustle (with Slick Pulla)	Released: February 9, 2007; Hosted by DJ Burn One; Label: Grand Hustle; Format: Digital download
Cocaine Kuntry: The Underboss (with DJ Scream)	Released: June 17, 2008; Label: Marki Entertainment; Format: Digital download
Everything Big	Released: July 5, 2011; Hosted by DJ MLK & DJ Scream; Label: Grand Hustle; Format: Digital download
100% Kane	Released: February 27, 2012; Label: Bread Box Cartel; Format: Digital download
Still Kuntry	Released: September 26, 2012; Hosted by DJ MLK; Label: Bread Box Cartel; Format: Digital download
Dope & Champagne	Released: December 12, 2012; Hosted by DJ Holiday; Label: Bread Box Muzik; Format: Digital download
G.D.O.D. (Get Dough Or Die) (with Grand Hustle)	Released: May 7, 2013; Label: Grand Hustle; Format: Digital download
Blu Cheeze	Released: August 7, 2014; Label: Bread Box Cartel; Format: Digital download
G.D.O.D. II (with Hustle Gang)	Released: September 19, 2014; Label: Grand Hustle; Format: Digital download
Lil Dope Boy Kane	Released: 2016; Label: Bread Box Cartel; Format: Digital download
Perignon Don	Released: August 11, 2017; Label: Bread Box Cartel; Format: Digital download

=== Singles ===
==== As lead artist ====
List of songs, with selected chart positions, showing year released and album name
Title	Year	Peak chart positions			Album
Title	Year	US	US R&B	US Rap	Album
"That's Right" (featuring T.I.)	2008	—	105	—	My Turn to Eat
"Da Baddest" (featuring Trey Songz)	2008	—	101	—	My Turn to Eat
"Kickin' Flav" (featuring T.I.)	2013	—	—	—	Dope & Champagne
"Trap Mode" (featuring Young Dolph)	2015	—	—	—	Lil Dope Boy Kane
"Bobby Womack" (featuring T.I. and Young Thug)	2016	—	—	—	Lil Dope Boy Kane
"—" denotes a title that did not chart, or was not released in that territory.

==== As featured artist ====
List of songs, with selected chart positions, showing year released and album name
Title	Year	Peak chart positions			Album
Title	Year	US	US R&B	US Rap	Album
"Imma Fool Wit It" (Killer Mike featuring Big Kuntry King	2009	—	—	—	Underground Atlanta
"'Bout Dat Life" (Daddy O featuring Big Kuntry King)	2014	—	—	—	100% Cartel Money
"—" denotes a title that did not chart, or was not released in that territory.

=== Guest appearances ===
List of non-single guest appearances, with other performing artists, showing year released and album name
Title	Year	Other artist(s)	Album
"Throwback"	2004	Freddie Gibbs, T.I.	Full Metal Jackit: The Mixtape Volume II
"Limelight"	2004	T.I.	Urban Legend
"Dip, Slide, Rideout"	2006	DJ Khaled, T.I., Young Dro	Listennn... the Album
"Aye"	2007	DJ Drama, Young Dro	Gangsta Grillz: The Album
"Big Shit Poppin' (Grand Hustle Remix)"	2007	T.I., Mac Boney, Alfamega, JR Get Money	—N/a
"Haters"|rowspan="2"|2008	B.o.B, Rick Ross, Juvenile	Hi! My Name Is B.o.B.	
"5000 Ones"|Young Dro, T.I.	I Am Legend		
"One"|rowspan="2"|2009	B.o.B, Mac Boney	B.o.B vs. Bobby Ray	
"Got To Know"|Young Dro	Lo Life		
"Regardless"|2013	Shad da God	Gas Life	
"Love to Hate Me"	2014	Doe B, T.I., Mitchelle'l	DOAT 3 (Definition of a Trapper)
