= Grand Hustle Records =

American record label

- Founded: February 28, 2003; 23 years ago
- Founder: Jason Geter; T.I.
- Status: Active
- Distributors: Atlantic (2003 – December 2012); EMPIRE
- Genre: Hip-hop; R&B
- Country of origin: United States
- Location: 1425 Ellsworth Industrial, Atlanta, Georgia, U.S.
- Official website: hstlgng32.com

Grand Hustle Records (formerly Grand Hustle Entertainment), also known as Hustle Gang Music, is an American hip-hop record label, founded in 2003, by American rapper and record executive T.I. and his manager Jason Geter. The label was distributed by Atlantic Records until December 2012, and has since operated as an independent record label.

The label has released 33 studio albums, with 14 having received Gold certification.

== History ==
=== 2003–11: Beginnings and various signings ===
Due to the poor commercial reception of his debut album, I'm Serious, T.I. was released from his Arista Records contract. He then formed Grand Hustle Entertainment and began releasing several mixtapes, with the assistance of DJ Drama. He resurfaced in the summer of 2003, alongside fellow Atlanta rapper and former label-mate Bone Crusher, on the song "Never Scared", and he signed a $2.3 million joint venture deal with Atlantic Records, under the leadership of Craig Kallman. T.I. released his second album Trap Muzik on August 19, 2003, through Grand Hustle; it debuted at number four on the Billboard 200 and sold 110,000 copies in its first week. It spawned the singles "24s", "Be Easy", "Rubberband Man", and "Let's Get Away". Executive produced by Jason Geter and T.I., the album featured T.I.'s friend and Grand Hustle artist, Mac Boney. The album was a critical and commercial success, with the album being seen as a major improvement over I'm Serious and was certified platinum in America. In March 2004, a warrant was issued for T.I.'s arrest after he violated his probation of a 1997 drug conviction. He was sentenced to three years in prison.

In 2005, T.I. signed fellow Bankhead-based rappers Alfamega and his childhood friend Young Dro to a deal with Grand Hustle. In July 2005, the label released the soundtrack to the film Hustle & Flow. The soundtrack included the song "It's Hard out Here for a Pimp", which won an Academy Award for Best Original Song. Also in 2005, T.I. added American soul singer-songwriter Governor to the Grand Hustle roster, after Atlantic Records chose T.I. to act as his mentor. Atlantic Records' plan for Governor, who joined Atlantic's roster almost four years prior, was to market him a devotee, or a card-carrying member of T.I.'s "camp". Atlantic first tried to pair him with record producer Dr. Dre, and then with gangsta rapper 50 Cent. Both plans fell through. In search of quick street credibility, the label brokered a deal for the singer to join T.I.'s imprint. After appearing on several of DJ Drama's Gangsta Grillz mixtapes, Governor later released his Grand Hustle debut Son of Pain, in September 2006.

Young Dro released his debut single, "Shoulder Lean", in the summer of 2006. With heavy rotation on BET And MTV2, the single reached the top 10 on the Billboard Hot 100, and it sold over 2 million ringtones. The single led Dro's major-label debut Best Thang Smokin', released in late August the same year. The album debuted and peaked in the top 3 on the Billboard 200. In December 2006, the label released Grand Hustle Presents: In da Streetz Volume 4, a compilation album featuring contributions from several Grand Hustle artists including aforementioned newcomers Alfamega, Young Dro and Governor. The compilation's title comes from a mixtape series entitled In da Streetz, that T.I. and his hip hop ensemble Pimp Squad Click (PSC), released in their early careers.

On October 13, 2007, federal authorities arrested T.I. four hours before the BET Hip Hop Awards in Atlanta. He was charged with two felonies – possession of three unregistered machine guns and two silencers, and possession of firearms by a convicted felon. The arrest was made in the parking lot of a downtown shopping center. T.I. was arrested after allegedly trying to purchase the guns from a "cooperating witness" with the Bureau of Alcohol, Tobacco, Firearms and Explosives. According to federal officials, the witness had been cooperating with authorities a few days prior to the T.I. arrest. The witness had been working as T.I.'s bodyguard since July, authorities said.

In May 2008, T.I. signed up-and-coming Atlanta-based musician B.o.B, who signed a joint partnership deal with Grand Hustle and super producer Jim Jonsin's Rebel Rock Entertainment, under Atlantic Records. B.o.B was later featured on T.I.'s album Paper Trail (2008) on the track "On Top of the World", which also featured Ludacris. In June 2008, T.I. announced the signing of Southern hip hop duo 8Ball & MJG to Grand Hustle, during his Hot 107-9 Birthday Bash. In December 2008, Killer Mike, whom T.I. previously collaborated with on the 2003 hit single "Never Scared", confirmed he signed a recording contract with Grand Hustle.

In 2008, T.I. also signed Philadelphia-based rapper Meek Mill to Grand Hustle. Shortly after, Mill was arrested, charged with a crime and ordered to serve seven months in jail. Mill was released during the early portion of 2009. Due to T.I.'s and Mill's respective legal troubles, Mill was never able to release an album under Grand Hustle and they parted ways in 2010.

In 2008, PSC member AK, also known as AK the Razorman, began to express his discontent with the label and his longtime friend T.I.: In a 2011 interview with Inday, a Grand Hustle marketing promoter, he confirmed AK and Yung L.A. were no longer a part of the label. In May 2009, T.I. dropped rapper Alfamega, who signed in 2005, after reports surfaced of his past as a DEA informant. A short-lived feud between the two later embroiled, with Alfamega releasing a diss track titled "Greenlight", in March 2010.

On September 1, 2010, T.I. and his wife Tameka "Tiny" Cottle, were arrested on drug charges in Los Angeles. The arrest for drug charges led to T.I. being sentenced on October 15, 2010, to 11 months in prison for violating the terms of his probation, specifically for possessing ecstasy, testing positive for opiates and associating with convicted felon C-Rod. However, on October 25, the drug charges against T.I. were dropped. On November 1, T.I. reported back to the Forrest City Federal Facility to serve his 11-month sentence. His date of release was set to be September 29, 2011. His seventh album No Mercy, was released on December 7, 2010, during his imprisonment. The album peaked at number four in the US and it sold over 159,000 copies in its first week. RIAA certified No Mercy Gold, with over 500,000 copies sold.

=== 2011–2016: Get Dough or Die series ===
In 2011, T.I. signed his youngest brother Bryce Harris, better known by his stage name GFM Bryyce. In December 2011 the OMG Girlz were signed to Interscope Records via Grand Hustle/Pretty Hustle. On March 1, 2012, T.I. revealed he signed rappers Iggy Azalea, Chip and Trae tha Truth, to Grand Hustle Records. T.I. was executive producer on Azalea's debut EP, Glory and was featured on the lead single "Murda Bizness", which premiered March 26, 2012. The EP was released on July 30, 2012. On October 9, 2012, T.I., Iggy Azalea, B.o.B, Chip and Trae tha Truth, were all featured on the annual BET Hip Hop Awards cypher. In 2012, Chip, formerly known as Chipmunk, also released his first project with Grand Hustle, a mixtape entitled London Boy. The mixtape, which features several appearances from Grand Hustle artists, including Iggy Azalea and T.I on the posse cut "Hustle Gang", was released on December 25, 2012. In early January 2013, B.o.B announced an upcoming Grand Hustle compilation album titled Hustle Gang.

On January 18, 2013, it was announced T.I. drew a close to his 10-year contract with Atlantic Records the month before, after releasing Trouble Man: Heavy Is the Head. It was reported he proposed a $75 million deal for any label that wanted to provide a home for him and his imprint. TMZ reported that T.I. had drawn up the details, which included exclusive signing of all Grand Hustle artists. T.I. allegedly negotiated with several big names in the industry: there were reports that Jay-Z was looking to sign T.I., hoping to add him to the Roc Nation roster; T.I. had dinner with Dr. Dre, who is thought to have proposed an Interscope signing to the rapper; Sony reportedly offered T.I. $50 Million, and spoke with Universal later that week.

In March 2013, T.I. and B.o.B filmed the music video for "Memories Back Then", a song featuring Kendrick Lamar and Kris Stephens. The song, which was recorded for Trouble Man: Heavy Is the Head, failed to appear on Trouble Man due to sample-clearance issues, it was announced to be being released as the lead single from the upcoming Grand Hustle Presents: Hustle Gang compilation album. The music video for "Memories Back Then", directed by Philly Fly Boy, was released April 22, 2013. The song was then officially released via iTunes the next day. The song has since debuted at #88 on the Billboard Hot 100.

On April 4, T.I. revealed the label would release a mixtape titled, G.D.O.D. (Get Dough or Die), during the first week of May 2013, preceding the compilation album. On April 19, 2013, T.I. formally introduced GOOD Music producer Travis Scott and Grammy Award winning songwriter Kris Stephens, as Grand Hustle signees. On April 28, a release date for the mixtape would later be announced to be May 7, 2013. As promised the mixtape was released on May 7, featuring 20 tracks and contributions from Grand Hustle artists T.I., Mitchelle'l, B.o.B, Young Dro, Big Kuntry King, Trae tha Truth, D.O.P.E., Travis Scott, Chip, Kris Stephens, Mac Boney, Doe B and Shad da God (formerly Rich Kid Shawty). "Problems", "Poppin' 4 Sum", "Kemosabe", and "Here I Go" were released as singles from the mixtape over the following months. In a May 8, 2013, interview, T.I. said that he was in talks of possibly signing American recording artists Yo Gotti, Problem, Jeremih and Kirko Bangz to Grand Hustle.

On December 28, 2013, Glenn Thomas, better known by his stage name Doe B, died after being shot in his home state of Alabama with Mike Feez. His manager DJ Frank White confirmed Doe B's death via Twitter. In February 2014, Grand Hustle collaborated with DJ Whoo Kid, DJ Skee and DJ MLK, to release the compilation mixtape SXEW Vol. 1: The Grand Hustle, the trio's annual SXSW inspired mixtape. The mixtape features appearances from T.I., Young Dro, Trae Tha Truth, Iggy Azalea and Doe B, the latter of which is featured on a song with T.I. and American rapper Raekwon, titled "I Wanna Know".

In an August 2014 interview with MTV, T.I. revealed plans to release the Grand Hustle compilation, which is tentatively due in December, following Paperwork: "What's holding up the Hustle Gang project is that we have some new additions to the mix, and we didn't wanna put out the project out without including or allowing those new additions to be part of it. Maybe we'll do a stroke of midnight release on New Years. We did that with F**k Da City Up and it did well, so maybe we'll try that again." On September 19, 2014, the label released the second installment to the G.D.O.D. (Get Dough or Die) series. Aside from Grand Hustle recording artists, the mixtape features additional appearances from Iggy Azalea, Meek Mill, Young Thug, Troy Ave, Watch The Duck, Yo Gotti, Trey Songz and Rich Homie Quan, among others.

In March 2015, it was announced the OMG Girlz, the musical trio that included T.I.'s stepdaughter Zonnique, was officially disestablished. In August 2015, D.O.P.E. member Spodee, announced he was no longer under Grand Hustle; during an interview he stated "Everybody know I was a loyal guy with Grand Hustle and Tip. And, you know, it's no bad blood. I'm not mad at Tip or anything like that, but I have the potential to be bigger than Tip or if not, just as big. So it was time, man. I outgrew that. [I was with Grand Hustle] for too long. Six years."

In September 2015, Travis Scott released his debut studio album Rodeo, under Grand Hustle and Epic Records. The album was supported by two singles, "3500" and "Antidote", the latter of which reached number 16 on the US Billboard Hot 100 chart and was certified platinum by the RIAA for sales over 1,000,000 digital downloads. In July 2016, Grand Hustle released a song under the namesake Hustle Gang, titled "40 Acres", featuring T.I. alongside fellow Atlanta-based rappers RaRa and Rossi.

On September 19, 2016, Grand Hustle released the compilation H.G.O.E. (Hustle Gang Over Errrrythang), featuring guest appearances from Young Thug, Chocolate Droppa, Future, Migos, B.o.B, London Jae, Young Dro, Trae tha Truth, Lotto Savage, Shad da God, Kap G and more.

=== 2017–present: We Want Smoke ===
On March 15, 2017, T.I. announced the Hustle Gang concert tour. The tour began on April 26 in Mobile, Alabama, going through 36 shows across the country before they wrapped up on June 11 in Jacksonville, Florida.

On June 28, 2017, a song titled "Game 7" was released as the first single from Grand Hustle's compilation album We Want Smoke. The song features verses from T.I., RaRa and Rossi. The album's second single "Do No Wrong", was released in July and features verses from GFMBRYYCE, Young Dro and T.I. The album's third single "Friends", was released with an accompanying music video, on September 8. "Friends" features Hustle Gang rappers T.I., RaRa, Brandon Rossi, Tokyo Jetz, Trae tha Truth and Young Dro.

On March 24, 2023, former vice president of Grand Hustle Claybourne "Clay" Evans Jr. died of a stroke.

== Notable artists ==
=== Current ===
Act	Year signed	Releases under the label	Notes
T.I. (Grand Hustle)	2003	15	Founder CEO member of PSC, member of Bankroll Mafia
Big Kuntry King (Grand Hustle, Bread Box Muzik)	2003	1	Member of P$C
DJ MLK	2010		
Joe Green (APE, Grand Hustle)	2026		Member of Them Green Guys
Mac Boney	2003		Member of P$C
Mitchelle'l	2007	—	
PSC	2003	1	
Shad Da God	2009		Member of Bankroll Mafia
T.O. Green (YBM, Grand Hustle)	2025		Member of Them Green Guys
Tokyo Jetz	2016	3	
Translee	2017	2	
Trae tha Truth (Grand Hustle, ABN, Empire)	2012	5	Vice president
Young Dro (Grand Hustle, Entertainment One)	2004	3	Member of P$C

=== Former ===
Act	Years on the label	Releases under the label	Notes
5ive Mics	2008–2020		
8Ball & MJG	2008–2010	1	
Alfamega	2005–2010		
B.G.	2007–2009	—	
B.o.B	2008–2019	5	
Chip	2012–2014	1	
D.G. Yola	2006–2007	—	
DJ Drama	2006–2011	2	Former in-house disc jockey
Iggy Azalea	2012–2015		
Governor	2005–2008	1	
Killer Mike	2008–2012	1	
London Jae (No Genre)	2016–2020		
Meek Mill	2008–2012	—	
OMG	2010–2015	—	
Rich Kids	2009–2011	—	
Ricco Barrino	2007–2015	—	
Spodee	2009–2015		
Travis Scott	2013–2020	4	
Yung Booke	2011–2019		
Yung L.A.	2007–2011	—	

== Publishing deals ==
Throughout the years, Grand Hustle Records has signed multiple artists (often in their respective early careers) to publishing deals. The following list documents notable artists who had signed such a contract at one point or another.

- Iggy Azalea
- Kris Stephens
- Spot

== Branches ==
=== Hustle Gang ===
Hustle Gang
- Years active: 2013–present
- Labels: Roc Nation; Defiant; Grand Hustle
- Members: 5ive Mics; B.o.B.; Bryyce; London Jae; Shad da God; Transee; T.I.; Tokyo Jetz; Trae tha Truth; Young Dro; Yung Booke
- Past members: Iggy Azalea; Kris Stephens; Spodee; Doe B (deceased); Peanut Da Don (deceased); RaRa (deceased)
- Website: www.hstlgng32.com

Hustle Gang is an American hip hop collective composed of signees of Grand Hustle, introduced in 2013. The group's debut LP, GDOD: Get Dough or Die was released the same year and co-released by record label Be Music. The group's 2017 releases were distributed by Roc Nation.

=== Smash Factory ===
Smash Factory
- Years active: 2009–present
- Label: Grand Hustle
- Members: T.I. Lamar "Mars" Edwards; C Gutta

Smash Factory was a production team composed of T.I., and Grand Hustle in-house producers, Lamar Edwards (known as Mars or MyGuyMars) and C Gutta (also known as Lil' C). The group has produced for the likes of Nelly and Young Dro.

== In-house producers ==
Grand Hustle Records has a production wing, which serves as a group of in-house producers for the label.

=== Current ===
- Aldrin "DJ Toomp" Davis – known for producing T.I.'s hit singles "24's", "Be Easy", "U Don't Know Me" and "What You Know".
- Cordale "Lil' C" Quinn – known for producing Young Dro's "Shoulder Lean" and "Rubberband Banks", Young Jeezy's "My Hood" and T.I.'s "Wit Me".
- Lamar "Mars" Edwards – a member of production team 1500 or Nothin', known for producing Asher Roth's "G.R.I.N.D (Get Ready It's a New Day)" and T.I.'s "Love This Life", among other songs from prominent artists.

=== Former ===
- DJ Drama (2006–2011) – former resident disc jockey for the label
- Nard & B (2007–2016) – production duo composed of Bernard "Nard" Rosser and Brandon "B" Rackley. Known for producing several songs, including Yung L.A.'s "Futuristic Love (Elroy)", Slim Thug's "So High", and co-producing Maino's "All the Above", with high-profile producer Just Blaze.

== Notable personnel ==
=== Current ===
- Clifford "Tip" Harris, Jr. – chief executive officer (CEO)

=== Former ===
- Trae tha Truth – vice president (VP)

== Discography ==
- All releases distributed by Atlantic Records until December 2012, unless otherwise noted.

=== Studio albums ===
Artist	Album	Details
T.I.	Trap Muzik	Released: August 19, 2003; Chart position: 4 U.S.; RIAA certification: Platinum
T.I.	Urban Legend	Released: November 30, 2004; Chart position: 7 U.S.; RIAA certification: Platinum
PSC	25 to Life	Released: September 20, 2005; Chart position: 10 U.S.; RIAA certification:
T.I.	King	Released: March 28, 2006; Chart position: 1 U.S.; RIAA certification: 2× Platinum
Young Dro	Best Thang Smokin'	Released: August 29, 2006; Chart position: 3 U.S.; RIAA certification: Gold
Governor	Son of Pain	Released: September 12, 2006; Chart position: –; RIAA certification: –
T.I.	T.I. vs. T.I.P.	Released: July 3, 2007; Chart position: 1 U.S.; RIAA certification: 2× Platinum
DJ Drama	Gangsta Grillz: The Album	Released: December 4, 2007; Chart position: 26 U.S.; RIAA certification: –
T.I.	Paper Trail	Released: September 30, 2008; Chart position: 1 U.S.; RIAA certification: 4× Platinum
Big Kuntry King	My Turn to Eat	Released: September 30, 2008; Chart position: 98 U.S.; RIAA certification: –
DJ Drama	Gangsta Grillz: The Album (Vol. 2)	Released: May 19, 2009; Chart position: 26 U.S.; RIAA certification: –
B.o.B	B.o.B Presents: The Adventures of Bobby Ray (released with Rebel Rock)	Released: April 27, 2010; Chart position: 1 U.S.; RIAA certification: 2× Platinum
8Ball & MJG	Ten Toes Down (released with E1)	Released: May 4, 2010; Chart position: 36 U.S.; RIAA certification: –
T.I.	No Mercy	Released: December 7, 2010; Chart position: 4 U.S.; RIAA certification: Platinum
Killer Mike	PL3DGE (released with SMC)	Released: May 17, 2011; Chart position: 115 U.S.; RIAA certification: –
B.o.B	Strange Clouds (released with Rebel Rock)	Released: May 1, 2012; Chart position: 5 U.S.; RIAA certification: Platinum
T.I.	Trouble Man: Heavy Is the Head	Released: December 18, 2012; Chart position: 2 U.S.; RIAA certification: Platinum
Young Dro	High Times (released with eOne and Atlantic)	Released: October 15, 2013; Chart position: 57 U.S.; RIAA certification: –
B.o.B	Underground Luxury (released with Rebel Rock and Atlantic)	Released: December 17, 2013; Chart position: 22 U.S.; RIAA certification: Gold
T.I.	Paperwork (released with Columbia)	Released: October 21, 2014; Chart position: 2 U.S.; RIAA certification: Platinum
Trae tha Truth	Tha Truth (released with ABN and Empire)	Released: July 24, 2015; Chart position: 165 U.S.; RIAA certification: –
Travis Scott	Rodeo (released with Epic)	Released: September 4, 2015; Chart position: 3 U.S.; RIAA certification: Platinum
Young Dro	Da Reality Show (released with eOne)	Released: September 18, 2015; Chart position: –; RIAA certification: –
Trae tha Truth	Tha Truth, Pt. 2 (released with ABN and Empire)	Released: February 5, 2016; Chart position: –; RIAA certification: –
Travis Scott	Birds in the Trap Sing McKnight (released with Epic)	Released: September 2, 2016; Chart position: 1 U.S.; RIAA certification: Platinum
Trae tha Truth	Tha Truth, Pt. 3 (released with ABN and Empire)	Released: July 21, 2017; Chart position: –; RIAA certification: –
Huncho Jack (Travis Scott & Quavo)	Huncho Jack, Jack Huncho (released with Epic, Cactus Jack, Quality Control, Capitol and Motown)	Released: December 21, 2017; Chart position: 3 U.S.; RIAA certification:
Travis Scott	Astroworld (released with Epic and Cactus Jack)	Released: August 5, 2018; Chart position: 1 U.S.; RIAA certification: 3× Platinum
Tokyo Jetz	Bonafide (released with Empire)	Released: September 30, 2018; Chart position: RIAA certification:
T.I.	Dime Trap (released with Epic)	Released: October 5, 2018; Chart position: 13 U.S.; RIAA certification:
T.I.	The L.I.B.R.A. (released with Empire)	Released: October 16, 2020; Chart position: 18 U.S.; RIAA certification:
Tokyo Jetz	Cancel Culture (released with Empire)	Released: March 19, 2021; Chart position: RIAA certification:
T.I.	Kill the King (releasing with Empire)	Releasing: June 26, 2026

=== Compilation albums ===
Artist	Album	Details
Various artists	Music from and Inspired by the Motion Picture Hustle & Flow	Released: July 12, 2005; Soundtrack; Chart position: 30 U.S.; RIAA certification: –
Various artists	Grand Hustle Presents: In da Streetz Volume 4	Released: December 19, 2006; Compilation; RIAA certification: –
Various artists	SXEW Vol. 1: The Grand Hustle	Released: February 11, 2014; Compilation/mixtape; Format: Free download
Various artists	G.D.O.D. (Get Dough or Die)	Released: May 7, 2013; Compilation/mixtape; Format: Free download
Various artists	G.D.O.D. II	Released: September 19, 2014; Compilation/mixtape; Format: Free download
B.o.B	Psycadelik Thoughtz (released with Rebel Rock and Atlantic)	Released: August 14, 2015; Chart position: 97 U.S.; RIAA certification: –
Various artists	H.G.O.E. (Hustle Gang Over Errrrythang)	Released: September 19, 2016; Compilation/mixtape; Format: Free download
T.I.	Us or Else: Letter to the System (released with Roc Nation)	Released: December 16, 2016; Chart position: RIAA certification:
Various artists	We Want Smoke (released with Roc Nation)	Released: October 13, 2017; Compilation; Chart position: –; RIAA certification: –

=== EPs ===
Artist	Album	Details
T.I.	A King of Oneself	Released: September 30, 2008; Chart position: 128 U.S.
T.I.	Paper Trail: Case Closed	Released: August 28, 2009 (UK); Chart position: 150 U.S.
Iggy Azalea	Glory	Released: July 30, 2012
T.I.	Da' Nic (released with Kings Inc. and Empire)	Released: September 11, 2015; Chart position: 22 U.S.; RIAA certification:
T.I.	Us or Else (released with Roc Nation)	Released: September 23, 2016; Chart position: 175 U.S.; RIAA certification:
RaRa	I Am What I Am (released with Empire)	Released: March 10, 2017; Chart position: RIAA certification:
Yung Booke	Heartbreak 6.0 (released with Unos / Hustle Gang)	Released: May 23, 2018; Chart position: RIAA certification:
Translee	Freedom Summer (released with Digital Native Culture)	Released: August 28, 2018; Chart position: RIAA certification:
