= Kevo =

Kevo may refer to:

== People ==
- Kevo Muney (born c. 2001), American rapper and singer
- Claudio Kevo Cavallini (1952–2015), Italian sculptor
- Mirko Norac Kevo (born 1967), Croatian former general

== Other uses ==
- 2291 Kevo, a minor planet
- Kevo Strict Nature Reserve, a nature reserve in Utsjoki, Finland
- KQSL, rebroadcast as KEVO-LD, a TV station licensed to Fort Bragg, California, U.S.
