= Yellow Tape =

Yellow Tape may refer to:

- Barenaked Ladies (EP), commonly known as The Yellow Tape
- The Yellow Tape, a street album by 40 Cal.
- Yellow Tape (Key Glock album), an album by Key Glock
  - Yellow Tape 2, a 2021 sequel album by Key Glock
- "Yellow Tape", a song by Chris Brown from Heartbreak on a Full Moon
- Yellow Tape, a mixtape by Zayn Malik

== See also ==
- Barricade tape
