= Glockoma 2 =

Studio album by Key Glock
- Released: February 24, 2023
- Recorded: 2022–2023
- Genre: Hip hop; trap
- Length: 40:29
- Label: Paper Route Empire
- Producer: Aim on My Neck; Bandplay; Bankroll Got It; Blondobeats; DY; JohnnyTurnItUp; The MarTian SMG (credited as Marvin E. Haskins); Mannie IL; Norman A. Harris; Teddy Walton; Nemo

Key Glock chronology
Yellow Tape 2 (2021)	Glockoma 2 (2023)	Glockaveli (2025)

Singles from Glockoma 2
- 1. "From Nothing" Released: August 17, 2022; 2. "Work" Released: February 17, 2023; 3. "Dirt" Released: February 22, 2023

Glockoma 2 is the third studio album by American rapper Key Glock. It was released on February 24, 2023, through Paper Route Empire. The album peaked at number 13 on the US Billboard 200.

== Background and promotion ==
The album serves as the sequel to Key Glock's 2018 mixtape Glockoma. According to producer Bandplay, most of the album was recorded during the European leg of Key Glock's summer 2022 tour.

On December 7, 2022, Key Glock announced a supporting tour for the album, which included dates from March 5 to April 28, 2023. Three days prior to the album's release, Key Glock revealed the album's track listing on social media. The album cover took inspiration from When the Pawn... by Fiona Apple.

On June 23, 2023, Key Glock released the deluxe version of the album, featuring 8 additional songs.

=== Singles ===
The album's lead single, "From Nothing", was released on August 17, 2022. The album's second single, "Work", was released on February 17, 2023. The album's third single, "Dirt", was released on February 22, 2023. The lead single for the deluxe version of the album, "Presidential Rolex", was released on June 19, 2023.

== Critical reception ==
Professional ratings
Review scores
Source	Rating
AllMusic	3/5 stars
HipHopDX	3.7/5
Pitchfork	7.0/10
RapReviews	7/10

Reviewing for AllMusic, Paul Simpson wrote, "Most of the subject matter on Glockoma 2 is nothing new for the rapper -- the lyrics are generally focused on hustling hard to make as much money as possible, with detailed verses about sex, gun violence, and drugs. However, he maintains a skillful, seemingly effortless rhyming style, and some of the production is highly inventive" Eric Diep of HipHopDX wrote, "While Glock's sequel tape doesn't quite capture the spontaneous energy of his breakout predecessors, there's plenty of flex raps, pimp energy and Memphis rap signatures to get Huey's and Gus's jumping."

== Track listing ==
All tracks are written by Markeyvius LaShun Cathey.

Glockoma 2 track listing
No.	Title	Producer(s)	Length
1.	"Dirt"	The MarTian SMG (credited as Marvin E. Haskins)	3:19
2.	"Work"	Bandplay	2:23
3.	"Randy Orton"	Aim On My Neck	2:53
4.	"Chromosomes"	Bandplay	2:31
5.	"2 for 1"	JohnnyTurnItUp; Teddy Walton	2:59
6.	"Pop My Shit"	Hitkidd; Norman A. Harris	2:31
7.	"Designer Down"	Bankroll Got It	2:28
8.	"From Nothing"	Blondobeats	2:49
9.	"Key Rex"	Bandplay	2:13
10.	"In & Outta Town"	Hitkidd	2:22
11.	"Fuck Dat Shit"	Bandplay	3:17
12.	"Money Over Hoes"	Bandplay, Nemo Odysseus	2:37
13.	"Ratchet"	Bandplay	2:35
14.	"Homicide Gvng"	Mannie IL	2:52
15.	"Fuck a Feature"	DY	2:40
Total length:			40:29

All tracks are written by Markeyvius LaShun Cathey.

Deluxe edition track listing
No.	Title	Producer(s)	Length
1.	"Sucker Free"	Mannie IL; KXVI	2:03
2.	"Let's Go"	KingWonka; Hadouken!	2:20
3.	"No Hook"	OhRoss; RamyontheBeat; Swamiq	2:11
4.	"Penny"	Mannie IL; Swaeze	2:13
5.	"MaMa Said"	Twisted Genius; DOT	2:29
6.	"Presidential Rolex"	Grayson Beats; Tay Keith	2:28
7.	"Lean Habits"	OhRoss; RamyontheBeat	2:33
8.	"Last Man Standing"	Splitedstupid; Pirate	2:35
Total length:			59:24

== Charts ==
Chart performance for Glockoma 2
Chart (2023)	Peak position
US Billboard 200	13
US Top R&B/Hip-Hop Albums (Billboard)	8

== Certifications ==
Region	Certification	Certified units/sales
United States (RIAA)	Gold	500,000^{‡}
^{‡} Sales+streaming figures based on certification alone.
