= Tay Keith discography =

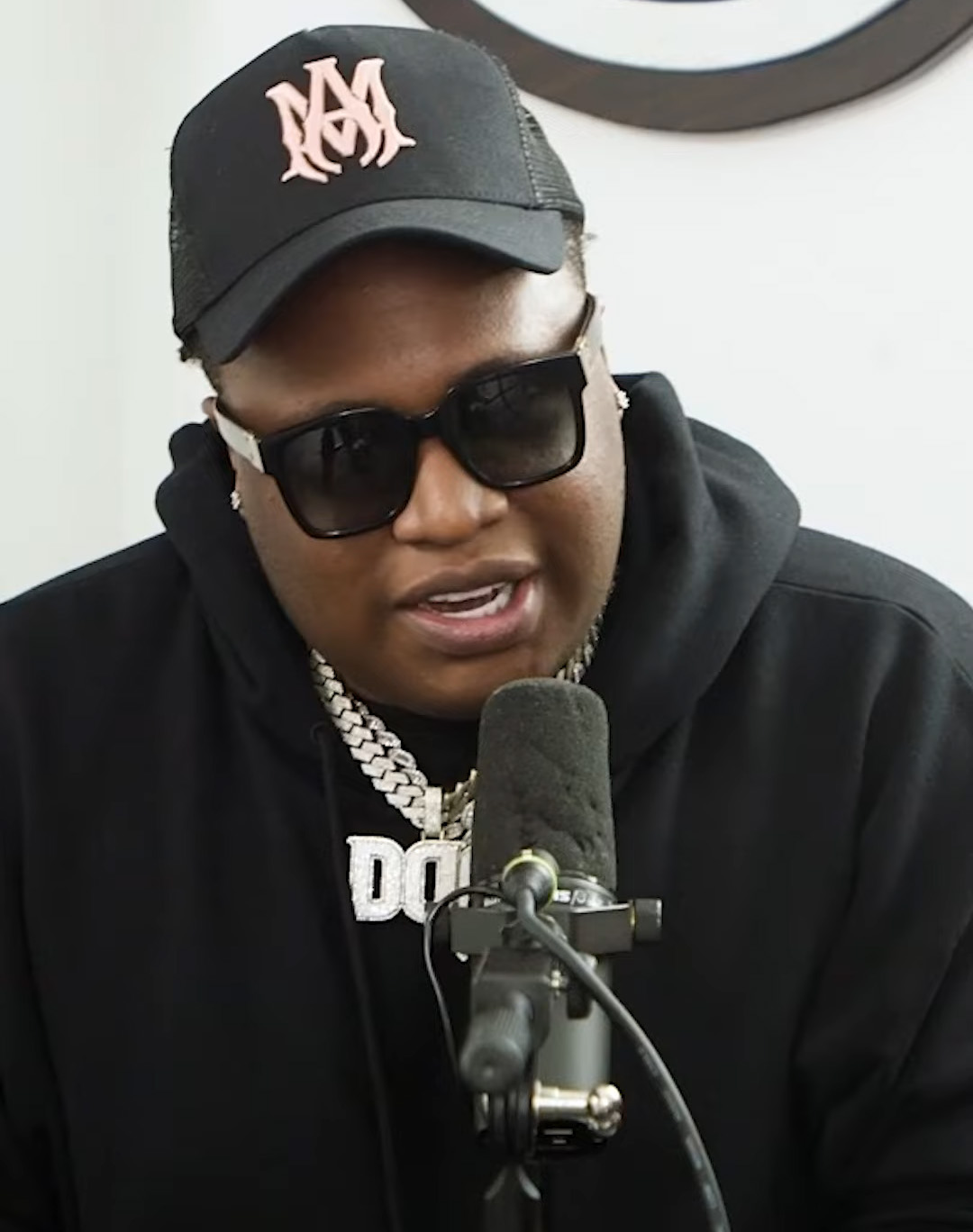
- Tay Kieth in 2023
- Studio albums: 1
- Mixtapes: 4
- Extended plays: 1

American record producer Tay Keith released one studio album, four mixtapes, and one extended play before his death in 2026.

== Collaborative albums ==
Title	Album details
Fxck the Cash Up (with Fast Cash Boyz)	Released: May 21, 2020; Label: Fast Cash, DOA, Empire; Format: Digital download, streaming

== Mixtapes ==
Title	Album details
Foolhardy (with Co Cash)	Released: May 18, 2018; Label: Committed; Format: Digital download, streaming
Fuxk These Niggas Up 2 (with Lil Juice)	Released: November 7, 2019; Label: 700 Klan; Format: Digital download, streaming
Warning Shots (with Lil Juice)	Released: November 17, 2020; Label: 700 Klan; Format: Digital download, streaming
Yung n Turnt (with Lil Darius)	Released: November 7, 2023; Label: Encore; Format: Digital download, streaming

== Extended plays ==
Title	EP details
Fuxk These Niggas Up (with Lil Juice)	Released: September 24, 2018; Label: 700 Klan; Format: Digital download, streaming

== Singles ==
=== As lead artist ===
Title	Year	Peak chart positions				Certifications	Album
Title	Year	US	US R&B/HH	US Rap	US Rhy.	Certifications	Album
"Winter" (with Money Man)	2018	—	—	—	—		Winter
"Nothin To Me" (with Hardo and Peewee Longway featuring Doe Boy)	2020	—	—	—	—		Days Inn
"Bad Habits" (with Fast Cash Boyz featuring Murda Beatz)	2020	—	—	—	—		Fxck the Cash Up
"Cash Talk" (with Fast Cash Boyz featuring Co Cash)	2020	—	—	—	—		Fxck the Cash Up
"Day Day N Craig" (with BlocBoy JB)	2021	—	—	—	—		Bacc 2 Da Bloc
"Lights Off" (featuring Gunna and Lil Durk)	2022	—	—	—	—		Non-album single
"Pound Town" (with Sexyy Red or remix also with Nicki Minaj)	2023	66	21	14	19	RIAA: Platinum	Hood Hottest Princess
"Teamo" (with FTO Sett)	2023	—	—	—	—		Life of a SlimeCrook
"Lamborghini Boys" (with Lil Darius and Nardo Wick)	2023	—	—	—	—		Yung n Turnt
"About Us" (with Lil Darius)	2023	—	—	—	—		Yung n Turnt
"Scat Music" (with Baby Kia)	2024	—	—	—	—		Kia Boyz
"Love Latto" (with Bfb Da Packman)	2025	—	—	—	—		Non-album singles
"The Forum" (with Drumatized featuring BlocBoy JB)	2025	—	—	—	—		Non-album singles

=== As featured artist ===
Title	Year	Peak chart positions				Certifications	Album
Title	Year	IRE	NZ Hot	SCO	UK	Certifications	Album
"Rain" (Aitch and AJ Tracey featuring Tay Keith)	2020	10	14	23	3	ARIA: Platinum; BPI: 2× Platinum; IFPI DEN: Gold; RMNZ: Platinum	Polaris
"No Chorus, Pt. 12" (BlocBoy JB featuring Tay Keith)	2020	—	—	—	—		FatBoy
"Main Slime Remix" (Pooh Shiesty featuring Moneybagg Yo and Tay Keith)	2020	—	—	—	—		So Icy Summer
"Hollup" (3ohblack featuring Moneybagg Yo and Tay Keith)	2020	—	—	—	—		Who Want It
"SoIcyBoyz 3" (Big Scarr featuring Gucci Mane, Pooh Shiesty, Foogiano and Tay Keith)	2021	—	—	—	—		Big Grim Reaper
"Wrong One" (GloRilla, Gloss Up and Slimeroni featuring K Carbon, Aleza and Tay Keith)	2023	—	—	—	—		Gangsta Art 2
"Cry No More" (Headie One and Stormzy featuring Tay Keith)	2024	59	13	—	33		The Last One

== Other charted and certified songs ==
Title	Year	Peak chart positions	Certifications	Album
Title	Year	NZ Hot	Certifications	Album
"Automatic" (Denzel Curry featuring Tay Keith)	2019	25		Zuu
"SoIcyBoyz 2" (Big Scarr featuring Pooh Shiesty, Foogiano and Tay Keith)	2020	—	RIAA: Gold	So Icy Gang Vol. 1 and Big Grim Reaper

== Guest appearances ==
Title	Year	Other artist(s)	Album
"Grab A..."	2019	Quality Control, Duke Deuce	Control the Streets, Volume 2
"Intro"	2019	BenDaDonnn, DJ Drama	Lunch Table Legend
"Always Talking To God"	2019	Kevo Muney	Baby G.O.A.T.
"Moncler"	2020	Bankroll Freddie	From Trap to Rap
"Piccolo"	2020	10k.Caash	Left Alone
"Opp Boy"	2020	Skooly	Nobody Likes Me
