= Glockaveli =

- Standard cover. The re-release features a colorized cover.

Studio album by Key Glock
- Released: May 2, 2025
- Studio: Barron (Atlanta); Twin Studios (Paris); Blue Room (Atlanta); Studio P (Atlanta); Street Execs (Atlanta)
- Genre: Hip hop; trap
- Length: 45:47
- Label: Paper Route Empire; Republic
- Producer: AyJay089; Bankroll Got It; Big Boyy Fresh; Luc Charlier; DJ Paul; Grayson Beats; He Flappy; Immaculate1; Key Pushaz; King Wonka; Lo Beats; Tom Levesque; Magni; Mannie II; Mike Mixer; Oh Ross; Pilgrim; Quisgothitz; RamyontheBeat; Maxwell Scott; Tay Keith; Twhyxclusive

Key Glock chronology
Glockoma 2 (2023)	Glockaveli (2025)	Project X (2026)

Glockaveli: All Eyez on Key cover art

Singles from Glockaveli
- 1. "3am in Tokeyo" Released: February 7, 2025; 2. "No Sweat" Released: March 13, 2025; 3. "The Grinch" Released: April 18, 2025; 4. "She Ready" Released: May 27, 2025

Glockaveli is the fourth studio album by American rapper Key Glock. It was released on May 2, 2025, through Paper Route Empire and Republic Records, as his major-label debut album.

== Background and promotion ==
First announced in August 2024, Glockaveli experienced several delays. It was initially set for release on September 13, 2024, coinciding with the anniversary of 2Pac's death, but was postponed to February 12, 2025. Less than two weeks before that date, it was delayed again to March 14. After further reworking of the album, its official release date was finalized as May 2, 2025.

The rollout began on February 7, 2025, with the lead single "3AM in ToKEYo". On March 13, Key Glock followed up with the second single, "No Sweat", which launched the album's pre-order phase and came with a major announcement: his signing to Republic Records. Despite this, Key Glock remains associated with Young Dolph's label, Paper Route Empire.

The album's third single, "The Grinch", was released on April 18, 2025. On April 25, Key Glock unveiled the official tracklist via Instagram, which later appeared on the album's pre-save page on Apple Music. It confirmed that one of his most anticipated songs, the title track "Glockaveli" - featuring a sample of 2Pac's "Hail Mary" - will appear as track two on the 18-song project. The track was first teased in August 2022 during his Yellow Tape 2 International Tour vlog. "She Ready" was released to urban contemporary radio as the album's fourth single on May 27, 2025.

On May 5, 2025, Key Glock released an extended version of the album titled Glockaveli: The Don, featuring three additional bonus tracks. The deluxe edition of the album, titled Glockaveli: All Eyez on Key, was released on August 29, 2025.

== Critical reception ==
Professional ratings
Review scores
Source	Rating
AllMusic	3/5 stars

HotNewHipHop listed the album as the 10th best of 2025.

== Track listing ==
Glockaveli standard edition digital track listing
No.	Title	Writer(s)	Producer(s)	Length
1.	"Hallelujah"	Markeyvius Cathey; Kai Fleming; Ramiro Morales; Cole Wainwright	King Wonka; Oh Ross; RamyontheBeat	2:37
2.	"Glockaveli"	Cathey; Emmanuel Iledare; Michael McWhite; Craig Morsell Jr.; Marquis Smith	Immaculate1; Mannie II; Mike Mixer; Quisgothitz	2:21
3.	"Blue Devil"	Cathey; Joseph Bates; Iledare	Big Boyy Fresh; Mannie II	2:19
4.	"Made a Way"	Cathey; Beck Norling; Cole Wainwright	Oh Ross; Pilgrim	2:20
5.	"Watch Da Throne"	Cathey; Brytavious Chambers; Grayson Serio	Grayson Beats; Tay Keith	2:36
6.	"Badu"	Cathey; Fleming	King Wonka	2:36
7.	"She Ready"	Cathey; Shane Jessen; Wainwright	Lo Beats; Oh Ross	2:59
8.	"No Sweat"	Cathey; Fleming	King Wonka	2:35
9.	"The Grinch"	Cathey; Wainwright	Oh Ross	2:35
10.	"Sunny Dayz"	Cathey; Joel Banks; Taylor Banks	Bankroll Got It	2:39
11.	"Papercutz"	Cathey; Fleming	King Wonka	2:47
12.	"Kill My Vibe"	Cathey; Fleming; Alexander Tsygankov; Artem Yarullin	Key Pushaz; King Wonka	2:02
13.	"I'm Getting It"	Cathey; Tom Levesque; Morales; Wainwright	Luc Charlier; Maxwell Scott; Oh Ross; RamyontheBeat; Levesque	2:42
14.	"Again"	Cathey; Fleming	King Wonka	2:27
15.	"Cream Soda"	Cathey; Fleming	King Wonka	2:45
16.	"Don Dada"	Cathey; Fleming	King Wonka	2:33
17.	"World Is Ourz"	Cathey; Vyacheslav Klyuchnikov; Mavdryk Petrovich	Magni; He Flappy	2:40
18.	"3am in Tokeyo"	Cathey; Phillip Albinger; Paul Beauregard; Tim Moore	AyJay089; DJ Paul; Twhyxclusive	2:26
Total length:				45:47

Glockaveli: The Don bonus track listing
No.	Title	Writer(s)	Producer(s)	Length
19.	"Money Habits"	Cathey; Ramiro Morales; Wainwright; Vladimir Vlasilav; Bxndzgotjunts; Duprie Monroe	RamyOnTheBeat; Oh Ross; Blazerfxme; Bxndzgotjunts; Broadday	3:02
20.	"Going Hard"	Cathey; Fleming	King Wonka	2:23
21.	"All Dogs Go to Heaven"	Cathey; Juvy Catcher; Dwan Avery; Jeffrey LaCroix	Juvy Catcher; DY Krazy; TrePounds	2:22
Total length:				53:34

Glockaveli: All Eyez on Key: disc 1 track listing
No.	Title	Writer(s)	Producer(s)	Length
1.	"Set in Stone"	Cathey; Wainwright	Oh Ross	2:28
2.	"South Memphis Patriot"	Cathey; Fleming	King Wonka	2:40
3.	"Fashion Killa"	Cathey; Wainwright	Oh Ross	2:21
4.	"Bottega Bag"	Cathey; Abelardo Tamez; Wainwright; Morales	Oh Ross; RamyontheBeat; AJ	2:57
5.	"Daddy's Little Girl"	Cathey; Jacob Canady; Oriel Bitton; Ofer Ishai	ATL Jacob; Bitton; Kuji	2:33
6.	"Can't Feel My Face"	Cathey; Wainwright; Thomas Herrick; Vadim Novystkyi	Oh Ross; Toom; Ozi	2:16
7.	"Fabo"	Cathey; Devon Cline; Jamichael Benson	Denaro Love; Yeti on the Beat	2:42
8.	"Trust Myself"	Cathey; Wainwright; Beck Noring	Oh Ross; Pilgrim	2:20
9.	"Red Shirt"	Cathey; Wainwright; Ben Poret; Josh Taylor	Oh Ross; Dover; Taylor	2:22
10.	"Fell in Luv"	Cathey; Wainwright; Morales	Oh Ross; RamyontheBeat	2:59
Total length:				79:12

Glockaveli – Physical release
No.	Title	Writer(s)	Producer(s)	Length
1.	"Hallelujah"	Markeyvius Cathey; Kai Fleming; Ramiro Morales; Cole Wainwright	King Wonka; Oh Ross; RamyontheBeat	2:37
2.	"Glockaveli"	Cathey; Emmanuel Iledare; Michael McWhite; Craig Morsell Jr.; Marquis Smith	Immaculate1; Mannie II; Mike Mixer; Quisgothitz	2:21
3.	"Watch Da Throne"	Cathey; Brytavious Chambers; Grayson Serio	Grayson Beats; Tay Keith	2:36
4.	"No Sweat"	Cathey; Fleming	King Wonka	2:35
5.	"Sunny Dayz"	Cathey; Joel Banks; Taylor Banks	Bankroll Got It	2:39
6.	"Blue Devil"	Cathey; Joseph Bates; Iledare	Big Boyy Fresh; Mannie II	2:19
7.	"Cream Soda"	Cathey; Fleming	King Wonka	2:45
8.	"3am in Tokeyo"	Cathey; Phillip Albinger; Paul Beauregard; Tim Moore	AyJay089; DJ Paul; Twhyxclusive	2:26
9.	"The Grinch"	Cathey; Wainwright	Oh Ross	2:35
10.	"Papercutz"	Cathey; Fleming	King Wonka	2:47
Total length:				25:40

Notes

- Physical releases only include "Hallelujah", "Glockaveli", "Watch Da Throne", "No Sweat", "Sunny Dayz", "Blue Devil", "Cream Soda", "3am in Tokeyo", "The Grinch" and "Papercutz".
- "3am in Tokeyo" is stylized as "3AM in ToKEYo".

== Personnel ==
Credits adapted from Tidal.

- Key Glock – vocals
- Glenn Schick – mastering
- Ari Morris – mixing
- Logan Schmitz – mixing assistance
- Emmanuel Iledare – engineering on "Blue Devil"
- Peezymane – engineering on "Watch Da Throne"
- Nathan Doutt – engineering on "No Sweat"
- Sammy Aonah Hanano – engineering on "Again" and "Cream Soda"

== Charts ==
=== Weekly charts ===
Weekly Chart performance for Glockaveli
Chart (2025)	Peak position
US Billboard 200	8
US Top R&B/Hip-Hop Albums (Billboard)	4

=== Year-end charts ===
Year-end chart performance for Glockaveli
Chart (2025)	Position
US Top R&B/Hip-Hop Albums (Billboard)	71
