= Dum and Dummer 2 (mixtape) =

Mixtape by Young Dolph and Key Glock
- Released: March 26, 2021
- Genre: Hip hop; trap
- Length: 62:00
- Label: Paper Route Empire
- Producer: BandPlay; Beatmonster Marc; Sledgren; Yung Lan

Young Dolph chronology
Rich Slave (2020)	Dum and Dummer 2 (2021)	Paper Route iLLUMINATi (2021)

Key Glock chronology
Yellow Tape (2020)	Dum and Dummer 2 (2021)	Paper Route iLLUMINATi (2021)

Dum and Dummer 2 is the second collaborative mixtape by American rappers Young Dolph and Key Glock, and the sequel to their 2019 mixtape Dum and Dummer. It was released on March 26, 2021, through Young Dolph's label Paper Route Empire. The production on album was primarily handled by BandPlay.

Dum and Dummer 2 was preceded by five singles: "Aspen", "Case Closed", "I'm the Type", " Sleep with the Roaches", and "Penguins". The album received generally positive reviews from music critics and was a moderate commercial success.

== Track listing ==
Credits were adapted from Genius. All songs are written by Markeyvius LaShun Cathe and Adolph Robert Thornton Jr.

Dum and Dummer 2 track listing
No.	Title	Length
1.	"Penguins"	3:59
2.	"What U See Is What U Get"	2:49
3.	"Aspen"	2:47
4.	"In Glock We Trust" (performed by Key Glock)	2:28
5.	"Cheat Code"	4:39
6.	"Coordinate" (performed by Young Dolph)	3:19
7.	"I'm the Type" (performed by Key Glock)	2:29
8.	"Case Closed"	3:48
9.	"I Can Show You" (performed by Key Glock)	2:53
10.	"Rain Rain"	3:32
11.	"Somethin' Else"	3:40
12.	"Yeeh Yeeh" (performed by Young Dolph)	2:09
13.	"Buddy Love"	2:24
14.	"Nintendo" (performed by Key Glock)	2:46
15.	"Sleep with The Roaches"	3:05
16.	"Move Around" (performed by Key Glock)	2:50
17.	"Hashtag" (performed by Young Dolph)	3:39
18.	"Pot of Gold"	3:10
19.	"A Goat & A Dolphin"	2:30
20.	"Dummest & the Dummest"	3:06
Total length:		62:00

Notes

- "What U See Is What U Get" is stylized as "What u see is what u get"
- "In Glock We Trust" is stylized as "In GLOCK we trust"
- "Rain Rain" is stylized in uppercase letters as "RAIN RAIN"
