= Serial Killers (song) =

2022 single by Gucci Mane

Single by Gucci Mane

from the album So Icy Gang: The ReUp
- Released: April 15, 2022
- Length: 3:08
- Label: Atlantic; 1017
- Songwriters: Radric Davis; Krishon Gaines; Indyah; Malikov Radikovich; Liam McAlister
- Producers: BandPlay; Carter; LMC

Gucci Mane singles chronology
"Blood All on It" (2022)	"Serial Killers" (2022)	"Mrs. Davis" (2022)

Music video
- "Serial Killers" on YouTube

"Serial Killers" is a song by American rapper Gucci Mane, released on April 15, 2022, as the fourth single from his 2022 deluxe compilation album So Icy Gang: The ReUp. It was produced by BandPlay.

== Composition ==
Described as reminiscent of Gucci Mane's music in his early career, the song features "haunting" production. Lyrically, Mane criticizes rappers that pretend to have lived in the streets, while also detailing his own experiences of the lifestyle as proof of how he can tell if someone is lying about having lived it as well.

== Music video ==
The music video was released alongside the single. Directed by Omar the Director, it shows Gucci Mane rapping in a plastic-covered room, and wearing a pair of hoodies that are emblazoned with messages, which call for the release of 1017 Records rappers Pooh Shiesty and Foogiano.

== Charts ==
Chart performance for "Serial Killers"
Chart (2022)	Peak position
US Bubbling Under Hot 100 (Billboard)	5
US Hot R&B/Hip-Hop Songs (Billboard)	37
