= She Ready =

2025 single by Key Glock

Single by Key Glock

from the album Glockaveli
- Released: May 27, 2025
- Genre: Hip hop; trap
- Length: 2:59
- Label: Paper Route Empire; Republic
- Songwriters: Markevius Cathey; Shane Jessen; Cole Wainwright
- Producers: Lo Beats; Oh Ross

Key Glock singles chronology
"The Grinch" (2025)	"She Ready" (2025)	"Playaz Circle" (2025)

Music video
- "She Ready" on YouTube

"She Ready" is a song by American rapper Key Glock from his fourth studio album, Glockaveli (2025). Produced by Lo Beats and Oh Ross, it contains a sample of "Yes, I'm Ready" by Barbara Mason.

== Background ==
Key Glock described the song as "just me getting out of my comfort zone. Showing people that I can make different types of music." He explained that he first heard the phrase "Ready Spaghetti", which he uses in the song, when he was a kid. He considered it "just catchy and a good fit for this song."

== Music video ==
The music video was directed by Hidji and released on August 29, 2025. It stars reality television personality JaNa Craig, beginning with her having an exchange with her mother about what she should wear on her date. Key Glock drives to her house, a brownstone in New York City, and takes her on a romantic day with activities he has planned for her.

According to Glock, he wanted to "bring that early 2000s vibe back", with video vixens. He explained that the video slightly references the film Queen & Slim and added, "At first, I was thinking 70s, 80s vibe, but I was like, Man, I’m a 90s baby. I might as well go 90s, 2000s."

== Charts ==
=== Weekly charts ===
Weekly chart performance for "She Ready"
Chart (2025)	Peak position
US Billboard Hot 100	91
US Hot R&B/Hip-Hop Songs (Billboard)	17
US Rhythmic Airplay (Billboard)	5

=== Year-end charts ===
Year-end chart performance for "She Ready"
Chart (2025)	Position
US Hot R&B/Hip-Hop Songs (Billboard)	89
US Rhythmic Airplay (Billboard)	40
