= Proud (Key Glock song) =

2022 single by Paper Route Empire and Key Glock

Single by Paper Route Empire and Key Glock

from the album Long Live Young Dolph & Yellow Tape 2
- Released: January 18, 2022
- Genre: Hip hop; trap
- Length: 3:04
- Label: Paper Route Empire
- Songwriter: Markeyvius Cathey
- Producer: BandPlay

Key Glock singles chronology
| "Da Truth" (2021) | "Proud" (2022) | "Pain Killers" (2022) |

Music video
- "Proud" on YouTube

"Proud" is a song by American record label Paper Route Empire and American rapper Key Glock, released on January 18, 2022. It is a single from Paper Route Empire's compilation album Long Live Young Dolph (2022). Produced by BandPlay, the song sees Glock rapping about his grief over the death of rapper Young Dolph.

== Background and composition ==
Young Dolph, a cousin and mentor of Key Glock, was shot and killed in November 2021. The song finds Glock reflecting on it. Over trap production with piano keys, he opens with Dolph's signature ad-lib "ayyeee" and raps, "I lost my dog, I lost my mind, no lie, I'm really lost inside / I can get it back in blood, but still, I can't get back the time". Glock then lyrically expresses his feelings of vengeance and despair related to his loss, dealing with it by drinking, and his recent state of mind. The central theme of the song is his commitment to honor Dolph by working harder, as it would have made Dolph proud.

== Music video ==
The accompanying music video sees Key Glock rapping in front of a memorial at Memphis, Tennessee's Makeda's Homemade Butter Cookies, where Dolph frequented and died. Footage of Dolph also appears in intervals of the video.

== Charts ==
| Chart (2022) | Peak position |
|---|---|
| US Billboard Hot 100 | 73 |
