= Dirt (Key Glock song) =

2023 single by Key Glock

Single by Key Glock

from the album Glockoma 2
- Released: February 22, 2023
- Recorded: 2023
- Genre: Trap
- Label: Paper Route Empire
- Songwriters: Key Glock; Marvin E. Haskins
- Producer: The MarTian SMG (Marvin E. Haskins)

Key Glock singles chronology
"Randy Orton" (2023)	"Dirt" (2023)	"Work" (2023)

"Dirt" is a song by American rapper Key Glock, released on February 22, 2023, as the third single from his fifth studio album Glockoma 2 (2023). The track was produced and composed by Marvin E. Haskins, professionally known as The MarTian SMG. It was released through Paper Route Empire and distributed by Empire Distribution. The single peaked at number 88 on the Billboard charts and helped promote Glockoma 2, which debuted at number 13 on the Billboard 200 and number 8 on the Top R&B/Hip-Hop Albums chart.

== Background and release ==
"Dirt" was previewed by Key Glock in early 2023 and officially released on February 22 through Paper Route Empire with distribution by Empire Distribution as the album's third single.

== Composition and production ==
The beat for "Dirt" was produced, composed, and arranged by Marvin E. Haskins, known professionally as The MarTian SMG.

== Chart performance ==
"Dirt" debuted and peaked at number 88 on a U.S. Billboard chart. The parent album Glockoma 2 reached number 13 on the Billboard 200 and number 8 on the Top R&B/Hip-Hop Albums chart.

== Credits and personnel ==
Credits adapted from Muso.AI, Discogs, AllMusic, and MusicBrainz.

- Key Glock – performer, lyricist
- Marvin E. Haskins (The MarTian SMG) – executive producer, co-writer, composer, arranger, producer, programmer, sound design
- Paper Route Empire – label
- Empire Distribution – distributor
