= Let's Go (Key Glock song) =

2023 song by Key Glock

Single by Key Glock

from the album Glockoma 2
- Released: January 16, 2024
- Recorded: 2023
- Length: 2:20
- Label: Paper Route Empire
- Songwriters: Markevius Cathey; Kai Fleming; Hadouken Beats
- Producers: King Wonka; Hadouken Beats

Key Glock singles chronology
| "Bonecrusher" (2023) | "Let's Go" (2024) | "Money & Glocks" (2024) |

Music video
- "Let's Go" on YouTube

"Let's Go" is a song by American rapper Key Glock from the deluxe edition of his third studio album Glockoma 2 (2023). Produced by King Wonka and Hadouken Beats, it contains a sample of "Zoriuszka" by Werchowyna.

== Composition ==
The instrumental of the song features "chopped-up" choirs and heavy bassline, while the lyrics are about earning money by any means.

== Critical reception ==
Tallie Spencer of HotNewHipHop gave a positive review, writing "what sets 'Let's Go' apart is his ability to balance street narratives with catchy hooks, creating a track that resonates with a broad audience." In addition, she stated the production "serves as a perfect backdrop for Key Glock's assertive flow."

== Music video ==
An official music video was directed by Chris Villa. A teaser trailer for the clip was released on January 10, 2024, before the visual was released on January 16, 2024. The video co-stars actress Alix Lapri and sees Key Glock executing daring, violent heists alongside her. It incorporates scenes of "John Wick-style gun fu", which Key Glock learned from a stunt coordinator for the film, as well as flashy cars and lavish settings. After winning a game of poker with a straight flush, Glock engages in a fistfight in the back of a kitchen. He and Lapri kill the security through martial arts. As the building blows up behind them, the duo begins their crime spree across Miami, which involves them disguising their identities, robbing a convenience store and bank, stealing a car, a highway police chase and resulting shootout. When the police close in on them, Key Glock carries out an unexpected escape plan.

== Remix ==
An official remix by Brazilian DJ Alok was released on March 29, 2024. A second official remix featuring late American rapper Young Dolph was released on April 12, 2024.

== Charts ==
=== Weekly charts ===
Weekly chart performance for "Let's Go"
| Chart (2024) | Peak position |
|---|---|
| US Billboard Hot 100 | 59 |
| US Hot R&B/Hip-Hop Songs (Billboard) | 23 |
| US Rhythmic (Billboard) | 25 |

=== Year-end charts ===
2024 year-end chart performance for "Let's Go"
| Chart (2024) | Position |
|---|---|
| US Hot R&B/Hip-Hop Songs (Billboard) | 54 |

== Certifications ==
| Region | Certification | Certified units/sales |
|---|---|---|
| United States (RIAA) | Platinum | 1,000,000^{‡} |
^{‡} Sales+streaming figures based on certification alone.
