= RNB (song) =

2020 single by Young Dolph

Single by Young Dolph featuring Megan Thee Stallion

from the album Rich Slave
- Released: May 29, 2020
- Genre: Hip hop
- Length: 3:31
- Label: Paper Route Empire
- Songwriters: Adolph Thornton, Jr.; Megan Pete; Jordan Houston; Willie Hutch
- Producers: Juicy J; Sosa 808

Young Dolph singles chronology
"Sunshine" (2020)	"RNB" (2020)	"Blue Diamonds" (2020)

Megan Thee Stallion singles chronology
"Savage (Remix)" (2020)	"RNB" (2020)	"Girls in the Hood" (2020)

"RNB" is a song by American rapper Young Dolph featuring fellow American rapper-songwriter Megan Thee Stallion, released on May 29, 2020, as the lead single from Dolph's fifth solo studio album, Rich Slave. The song was produced by Juicy J and Sosa 808.

== Background ==
In March 2020, Young Dolph announced his retirement from music, citing wanting to spend time with family as the reason. However, he later backtracked on his statement, announcing that he was going to put out an album on March 20 that month. Although the album was not released that night, he released the single "Sunshine" a month later, and released "RNB" in May 2020. The album was later released on August 14, 2020, under the title Rich Slave.

== Critical reception ==
Wongo Okon of Uproxx complimented the track's "Southern magic" and "crisp one-liners".

== Charts ==
Chart performance for "RNB"
Chart (2020)	Peak position
US Bubbling Under Hot 100 (Billboard)	1
US Hot R&B/Hip-Hop Songs (Billboard)	46
US Rhythmic Airplay (Billboard)	17

== Certification ==
Region	Certification	Certified units/sales
United States (RIAA)	Gold	500,000^{‡}
^{‡} Sales+streaming figures based on certification alone.
