= Project X (Key Glock album) =

Studio album by Key Glock
- Released: June 19, 2026
- Genres: Hip hop; trap; chopped and screwed; Miami bass
- Length: 46:48
- Labels: Paper Route Empire; Republic
- Producers: Ari Morris; Bankroll Got It; Blazerfxme; Brandon Manley; Cubeatz; Grayson Beats; Honorable C.N.O.T.E.; Iulescu; KiCookedIt; Kid Hazel; King Wonka; LO; Mannie Il; Mike Wavvs; Oh Ross; Plu2o Nash; Sucuki; Tay Keith; Thankutimmy; Truckee Street

Key Glock chronology
Glockaveli (2025)	Project X (2026)

Singles from Project X
- 1. "Loco" Released: April 23, 2026; 2. "Go" Released: May 8, 2026

Project X (stylized in all caps) is the fifth studio album by American rapper Key Glock. It was released on June 19, 2026, through Paper Route Empire and Republic Records. Production was handled by a variety of producers, including Cubeatz, Honorable C.N.O.T.E., and Tay Keith, who died less than 24 hours before the album's release. The album has no features.

== Critical reception ==
Project X received generally positive reviews from critics. RatingsGameMusic wrote, "When it's all said and done, though, Project X doesn't offer much that longtime Key Glock fans haven’t already heard before. It's solid, familiar, and well-executed, but it doesn't do much to push his sound forward."

== Track listing ==
Project X track listing
No.	Title	Writer(s)	Producer(s)	Length
1.	"Mannish"	Markeyvius Cathey; Brytavious Lakeith Chambers; Grayson Serio; Miklos Rozsa	Grayson Beats; Tay Keith	2:28
2.	"50 Hoes"	Cathey; Ari Morris; Emmanuel Iledare; Kiyan N Vaughan; Timothy Adie	Ari Morris; KiCookedIt; Mannie Il; Thankutimmy	1:40
3.	"Hardknock"	Cathey; Algernod Washington; Kay Fleming; LaDamon Douglas; Radric Davis	King Wonka	1:53
4.	"Face Down"	Cathey; Alan Huang; Chambers; Chris Murdaugh; Daney Parker; June James; Quincy Earl Dukes	Tay Keith	2:21
5.	"Big 5"	Cathey; Cole Wainwright; Vladimir Vasilev	Oh Ross; Blazerfxme	2:04
6.	"6AM"	Cathey; Wainwright; Malcolm Stribling; Michael Washington Jr.; Tim Sinan Friedrich	Mike Wavvs; Oh Ross; Plu2o Nash; Sucuki	2:23
7.	"Dummy"	Cathey; Chambers; Kevin Gomringer; Tom Gomringer	Cubeatz; Tay Keith	2:36
8.	"Drug Luv"	Alexander Sekula; Chambers; Kevin Gomringer; Tom Gomringer	Cubeatz; Tay Keith; Iulescu	1:54
9.	"Work It"	Cathey; Wainwright; DJ Frye	Oh Ross	2:10
10.	"Faded"	Cathey; Wainwright; Joel Banks; Taylor Banks; Trevin Clay; Walden Wesley	Bankroll Got It; Oh Ross; Truckee Street	2:17
11.	"Sick"	Cathey; Carlton Mays Jr.	Honorable C.N.O.T.E.	2:26
12.	"Srt Muzik"	Cathey; Ahmar Bailey	Kid Hazel	2:26
13.	"Benzo"	Cathey; Brandon Manley; Chambers; Fleming	Brandon Manley; King Wonka; Tay Keith	2:44
14.	"Mannie Fresh"	Cathey; Bryan Williams; Byron O. Thomas; Fleming	King Wonka	2:31
15.	"Cherry on Top"	Cathey; Fleming	King Wonka	2:22
16.	"Loco"	Cathey; Fleming	King Wonka	2:34
17.	"Go"	Cathey; Wainwright; Fleming; Shane Jessen	King Wonka; LO; Oh Ross	2:25
18.	"Seeing Red"	Cathey; Fleming	King Wonka	2:11
19.	"Houston Flow"	Cathey; Wainwright; Donna Weiss; Fleming	King Wonka; Oh Ross	2:38
20.	"Reminiscing"	Cathey; Fleming	King Wonka	2:45
Total length:				46:48

Notes

- All track titles are stylized in all caps.
- The whole album has no features.

== Charts ==
Chart performance for Project X
Chart (2026)	Peak position
US Billboard 200	29
US Top Rap Albums (Billboard)	6
US Top R&B/Hip-Hop Albums (Billboard)	11
