= Hang wit a Bad Bitch =

2026 single by Sexyy Red featuring Key Glock

Single by Sexyy Red featuring Key Glock

from the album Yo Favorite Trappa Favorite Rappa
- Released: February 8, 2026
- Genre: Hip-hop
- Length: 2:34
- Label: Rebel; Gamma
- Songwriters: Janae Wherry; Markeyvius Cathey
- Producers: Sexyy Red; Key Glock; Tay Keith; Vladimir Laurent; Luh Ron Maybe Dis; Blackjack

Sexyy Red singles chronology
"If You Want It" (2025)	"Hang wit a Bad Bitch" (2026)

Key Glock singles chronology
"Down South" (2026)	"Hang wit a Bad Bitch" (2026)	"Out the Mud" (2026)

Music video
- "Hang wit a Bad Bitch" on YouTube

"Hang wit a Bad Bitch" is a single by American rapper Sexyy Red featuring fellow American rapper Key Glock. It was released on February 8, 2026 and produced by the artists alongside Tay Keith, Vladimir Laurent, Luh Ron Maybe Dis and Blackjack. The song appears on her fourth mixtape, Yo Favorite Trappa Favorite Rappa (2026).

== Critical reception ==
Alexander Cole of HotNewHipHop called the song a "banger" and commented "These are two artists who are consistent with their work, so it only makes sense that they sound good on a song together. This track is going to get some play this week, and rightfully so."

== Charts ==
Chart performance for "Hang wit a Bad Bitch"
Chart (2026)	Peak position
US Bubbling Under Hot 100 (Billboard)	6
US Hot R&B/Hip-Hop Songs (Billboard)	23
US Rhythmic Airplay (Billboard)	22
