= Dum and Dummer =

Studio album by Young Dolph and Key Glock
- Released: July 26, 2019
- Genre: Hip hop; trap
- Length: 60:20
- Label: Paper Route Empire
- Producer: BandPlay; Beatmonster Marc; Sledgren; Yung Lan

Young Dolph chronology
Role Model (2018)	Dum and Dummer (2019)	Rich Slave (2020)

Key Glock chronology
Glockoma (2018)	Dum and Dummer (2019)	Yellow Tape (2020)

Singles from Dum and Dummer
- 1. "Baby Joker" Released: July 18, 2019; 2. "Ill" Released: July 26, 2019

Professional ratings
Review scores
Source	Rating
AllMusic	3.5/5 stars
HipHopDX	3.5/5
Pitchfork	7.1/10

Dum and Dummer is a collaborative mixtape by American rappers Young Dolph and Key Glock. It was released on July 26, 2019, through Young Dolph's label Paper Route Empire. The production on album was primarily handled by Bandplay.

Dum and Dummer was preceded by two singles: "Baby Joker" and "Ill". The mixtape received generally positive reviews from music critics and was a moderate commercial success. It debuted at number eight on the US Billboard 200 chart, earning 36,000 album-equivalent units in its first week. The mixtape later spawned a sequel, Dum and Dummer 2, released on March 26, 2021.

== Background ==
Young Dolph and Key Glock announced the mixtape's release on July 22, 2019, which happened four days later. The music videos "Ill" and "Baby Joker", the singles from the mixtape, were released prior to that.

== Commercial performance ==
Dum and Dummer debuted at number eight on the US Billboard 200 chart, earning 36,000 album-equivalent units (including 2,000 copies in pure album sales) in its first week. This became the first US top-ten debut on the chart for both Young Dolph and Key Glock. The mixtape also accumulated a total of 43.7 million on-demand audio streams for the mixtape's songs.

== Track listing ==
Credits were adapted from Genius.

Dum and Dummer track listing
No.	Title	Writer(s)	Producer(s)	Length
1.	"III"	Markeyvius LaShun Cathey; Adolph Thornton, Jr.	Bandplay	3:16
2.	"If I Ever"	Cathey; Thornton, Jr.	Bandplay	3:09
3.	"1 Hell of a Life"	Cathey; Thornton, Jr.	Bandplay	2:39
4.	"Summo'"	Thornton, Jr.	Bandplay	2:36
5.	"Blac Loccs"	Cathey; Thornton, Jr.	Bandplay	2:19
6.	"Like Key"	Cathey	Bandplay	2:22
7.	"Back to Back"	Cathey; Thornton, Jr.	Bandplay	2:33
8.	"It Feel Different"	Thornton, Jr.; Bandplay; John Bradbury; Mike Lohmeier	Cigvicious; 1Mind; Bandplay	2:46
9.	"Baby Joker"	Cathey; Thornton, Jr.	Bandplay	2:38
10.	"Juicy"	Thornton, Jr.	Yung Lan; Beatmonster Marc	3:12
11.	"Water on Water on Water"	Cathey; Thornton, Jr.	Bandplay	3:43
12.	"Guess What?"	Cathey	Mannie iL; Bandplay	2:31
13.	"Reflection"	Cathey; Thornton, Jr.	Bandplay	3:24
14.	"Chill"	Thornton, Jr.	Bandplay	2:54
15.	"Everybody Know"	Cathey; Thornton, Jr.	Bandplay	2:27
16.	"Pride"	Cathey	Bandplay	2:43
17.	"Monster"	Cathey	Bandplay	2:08
18.	"Back at It"	Cathey	Bandplay	2:39
19.	"Cutthroat Committee"	Cathey; Thornton, Jr.	Bandplay	2:58
20.	"What's Wrong"	Cathey	Sledgren	2:23
21.	"Crashin' Out"	Thornton, Jr.	Bandplay	2:54
22.	"Dum & Dummer"	Cathey; Thornton, Jr.	Bandplay	2:06
Total length:				60:20

== Charts ==
Chart performance for Dum and Dummer
Chart (2019)	Peak position
US Billboard 200	8
US Top R&B/Hip-Hop Albums (Billboard)	4
