= Russian Cream =

2018 single by Key Glock

Single by Key Glock

from the album Glock Bond
- Released: January 24, 2018
- Genre: Hip hop; trap
- Length: 2:22
- Label: Paper Route Empire
- Songwriters: Markevius Cathey; Brytavious Chambers
- Producer: Tay Keith

Key Glock singles chronology
"Ball Like a Bitch" (2018)	"Russian Cream" (2018)	"Cocky" (2018)

Music video
- "Russian Cream" on YouTube

"Russian Cream" is a song by American rapper Key Glock, released on January 24, 2018, as the lead single from his mixtape Glock Bond (2018). It was produced by Tay Keith. Named after a Backwoods cigar flavor, the song finds Key Glock rapping about his lavish lifestyle.

It is known as his breakout single and remains one of his most popular songs to date. It was certified triple platinum by the Recording Industry Association of America (RIAA) on December 4, 2024.

== Background ==
In October 2018, Key Glock broke down the lyrics of the song on Genius's Verified, where he said:

Russian cream is my favorite Backwood, the best Backwood, the smoothest Backwood. And the reason behind the song, there really wasn't a reason. It was so addicting, I was just on one when I was in the studio. This song really was a freestyle, know what I'm sayin'? I had about four Russian creams, just pre-rolled right there beside me, and I was just in my zone and I just went with it, named it "Russian Cream."

== Critical reception ==
Gavin Godfrey of The Fader commented on the song, "What might easily be dismissed as a weed anthem is actually a full-on display of Glock's underrated lyrical prowess: 'Feel like Tarzan, all these trees / I get so high I can't breathe / Like LeBron, bitch I'm a king / But I never leave my heat.'"

== Music video ==
The music video was released in March 2018. Directed by Shot By Spencer, it shows Key Glock sitting on a throne in a "wintery palace". He is seen smoking, wearing jewelry and in the company of women.

== Certifications ==
Region	Certification	Certified units/sales
United States (RIAA)	3× Platinum	3,000,000^{‡}
^{‡} Sales+streaming figures based on certification alone.
