= Blood All on It =

2022 single by Gucci Mane

Single by Gucci Mane featuring Key Glock and Young Dolph

from the album So Icy Gang: The ReUp
- Released: April 1, 2022
- Label: Atlantic; 1017
- Songwriters: Radric Davis; Markeyvius Cathey; Adolph Thornton, Jr.; Krishon Gaines; Brandon Bradley
- Producers: BandPlay; Doughboy Beatz

Gucci Mane singles chronology
"Publicity Stunt" (2022)	"Blood All on It" (2022)	"Serial Killers" (2022)

Key Glock singles chronology
"Faygo" (2021)	"Blood All on It" (2022)	"Walkin (Remix)" (2022)

Young Dolph singles chronology
"Love the Hate" (2022)	"Blood All on It" (2022)	"Weekend" (2022)

Music video
- "Blood All on It" on YouTube

"Blood All on It" is a song by American rapper Gucci Mane, featuring vocals from fellow American rappers Key Glock and Young Dolph. It was released through Atlantic Records and 1017 Records as the third single from his deluxe compilation album So Icy Gang: The ReUp, on April 1, 2022. The song serves as Dolph's first posthumous feature. It debuted at number 98 on the US Billboard Hot 100 and number 32 on the Hot R&B/Hip-Hop Songs chart.

== Background ==
Mane paid tribute to Dolph on his 2021 track, "Long Live Dolph", from his compilation album, So Icy Christmas, rapping: "R.I.P. to Dolph, long, long live the legend / From Memphis to the 6, they felt you in the bricks / The day you died, it broke my heart, a day I won't forget / One thing you know, you're missed, one thing you know, we pissed".

== Critical reception ==
Dolph's appearance on the track was heavily praised by several music critics, including Tom Breihan of Stereogum, who felt that "all three rappers on the song find the pocket and sound confident as all hell" and "the Dolph on this track is the kind of Dolph that I want to remember". Writing for Revolt, Jon Powell felt that Dolph makes the song a "bittersweet" collaboration that sees the three artists rap about their riches, their choice in women, and take shots at their haters.

== Music video ==
The official music video for "Blood All on It" premiered alongside the release of the song on April 1, 2022. It sees the three artists rapping and dancing.

It includes cameo appearances from artists who are signed to Dolphs record label, Paper Route Entertainment, including Kenny Muney and Snupe Bandz.

== Credits and personnel ==
- Gucci Mane – lead vocals, songwriting
- Key Glock – featured vocals, songwriting
- Young Dolph – featured vocals, songwriting
- BandPlay – production, songwriting
- Doughboy Beatz – production, songwriting
- Eddie "eMIX" Hernandez – mixing
- Amani "A $" Hernandez – mixing assistance
- Colin Leonard – mastering

== Charts ==
Chart performance for "Blood All on It"
Chart (2022)	Peak position
US Billboard Hot 100	98
US Hot R&B/Hip-Hop Songs (Billboard)	32
