= Never Recover =

Song by Lil Baby and Gunna featuring Drake

from the album Drip Harder
- Released: October 5, 2018
- Genre: Trap
- Length: 3:14
- Label: YSL; Quality Control; Motown; Capitol
- Songwriters: Dominique Armani Jones; Sergio Kitchens; Aubrey Graham; Brytavious Chambers; Chandler Durham
- Producers: Tay Keith; Turbo

"Never Recover" is a song by American rappers Lil Baby and Gunna with Canadian rapper Drake. The track was released on October 5, 2018, as the final track on the former two's collaborative album, Drip Harder.

== Background ==
The song is the second collaboration from Lil Baby and Drake, following their May 2018 single "Yes Indeed".

== Critical reception ==
Peter A. Berry of XXL commented on Drake going "full Toronto boss mode" on the track, and complimented Lil Baby's verse as "hard".

== Charts ==
Chart (2018)	Peak position
Canada (Canadian Hot 100)	16
Ireland (IRMA)	89
New Zealand Hot Singles (RMNZ)	13
UK Singles (OCC)	46
US Billboard Hot 100	15
US Hot R&B/Hip-Hop Songs (Billboard)	9
US Hot Rap Songs (Billboard)	9

== Certifications ==
Region	Certification	Certified units/sales
Brazil (Pro-Música Brasil)	Gold	20,000^{‡}
Canada (Music Canada)	Platinum	80,000^{‡}
New Zealand (RMNZ)	Gold	15,000^{‡}
United Kingdom (BPI)	Silver	200,000^{‡}
United States (RIAA)	2× Platinum	2,000,000^{‡}
^{‡} Sales+streaming figures based on certification alone.
