= Sicko Mode =

2018 single by Travis Scott featuring Drake

- Skrillex remix cover art. Cover on streaming services replaces "I went to Astroworld" with "I went on [platform name]".

Single by Travis Scott featuring Drake (Note: Apple Music credited Drake, Swae Lee, and Big Hawk as featured artists for a brief period. The music video on YouTube continues to credit Drake as a featured artist.)

from the album Astroworld
- Released: August 21, 2018
- Recorded: 2017–2018
- Studio: Cactus (Honolulu); Westlake (Los Angeles); Henson (Hollywood)
- Genre: Progressive rap; trap
- Length: 5:12
- Label: Cactus Jack; Grand Hustle; Epic
- Songwriters: Jacques Webster II; Aubrey Graham; Khalif Brown; John Hawkins; Chauncey Hollis; Ozan Yildirim; Cydel Young; Tim Gomringer; Kevin Gomringer; Mirsad Dervić; Rogét Chahayed; Brytavious Chambers; Mike Dean; Luther Campbell; Harry Wayne Casey; Richard Finch; Christopher Wallace; Osten Harvey; Bryan Higgins; Trevor Smith; James Jackson; Malik Taylor; Keith Elam; Christopher Martin; Kamaal Fareed; Ali Shaheed Muhammad; Tyrone Taylor; Fred Scruggs; Kirk Jones; Chylow Parker; O'Shea Jackson
- Producers: Chahayed; Hit-Boy; Oz; Cubeatz; Tay Keith; Mike Dean

Travis Scott singles chronology
"Dangerous World" (2018)	"Sicko Mode" (2018)	"Neighbor" (2018)

Drake singles chronology
"Nonstop" (2018)	"Sicko Mode" (2018)	"No Stylist" (2018)

Music video
- "Sicko Mode" on YouTube

Audio sample
- file; help

"Sicko Mode" (stylized in all caps) is a song by American rapper Travis Scott featuring Canadian rapper Drake, with additional vocals from fellow American rappers Swae Lee and the late Big Hawk. The song is co-produced by the American record producer Tay Keith It was originally released by Epic Records on August 3, 2018, as the third track from Astroworld (2018), before being released as the second single on August 21.

"Sicko Mode" was Scott's first number one single on the US Billboard Hot 100 (although Drake is not credited on the Billboard charts), as well as the first hip-hop song in history to spend at least 30 weeks in the chart's top ten region. It was universally acclaimed by critics, and received nominations for Best Rap Performance and Best Rap Song at the 61st Annual Grammy Awards.

The song contains a sample from "Gimme the Loot", written by the Notorious B.I.G. and Easy Mo Bee, as performed by the former and an interpolation from "I Wanna Rock", written and performed by Uncle Luke. On December 9, 2020, the song was certified Diamond by the Recording Industry Association of America (RIAA).

== Composition ==
The song is in three distinct movements. There is the first movement, which starts from the beginning of the song to the one-minute mark. It features introductory vocals from Drake. The second movement starts at the one minute mark and ends before the three minute mark, featuring lead vocals from Scott. The third movement starts at the three-minute mark to the end of the song with lead vocals from both Scott and Drake. The first movement is written in the key of B♭ major, the second movement is written in the key of C♯ Phrygian (the relative minor of which is F♯ minor), and the third movement is composed in the key of E♭ minor. The first movement reminisces about a time with friends in winter. The second movement reminisces about past relationships with women. The third movement reminisces about the rappers' high school years, but now enjoys the luxury of flying out of a fixed base operator. The overall theme of the song is about reminiscing about past events in the rappers' lives and where they are now.

== Critical reception ==
"Sicko Mode" received critical acclaim, with some critics considering it the highlight of Astroworld. Writing for Rolling Stone, Christopher R. Weingarten deemed the "hard-knocking" track the "album highlight", while Brendan Klinkenberg from the same magazine described it as "the apex of Scott's synthetic instincts". Brian Josephs of Entertainment Weekly called it a "mini-suite of bangers". Roisin O'Connor of The Independent felt Drake "sounds more important on this record than he did at any point on his own recent release, Scorpion, with a ballsy, confident flow". Pitchfork ranked it the 19th best song of 2018.

== Chart performance ==
"Sicko Mode" debuted at number four on the US Billboard Hot 100, It reached number two following the release of its music video, originally behind "Girls Like You" by Maroon 5 featuring Cardi B, and then behind "Thank U, Next" by Ariana Grande. It later became his first number one on the issue dated December 8, 2018, after seventeen weeks in the top 10, aided in part by the Skrillex remix; had Drake been credited, it would have been his 7th number-one hit. The single also became Scott's first top 10 on the Radio Songs chart. It finished 3rd in Triple J's Hottest 100 2018. Reflecting on its commercial impact, Billboard magazine's Andrew Unterberger called the song "a three-part prog-rap odyssey that would've been unimaginable as a radio single years earlier, but which got audiences so hyped with its unexpected beat switches and back-and-forth hooks that the pop world had no choice but to meet it halfway".

"Sicko Mode" was the only number-one hit during the 2010s decade to feature a key change.

== Music video ==
The music video for "Sicko Mode" was directed by Dave Meyers and Travis Scott. It was released on October 19, 2018. The video starts with Scott's red head on a building while a camera zooms into it, and cuts to the next scene of people getting back into some multi-colored houses. The following scenes show Drake walking a dog while being burned by an eclipse and Scott riding a horse. The video ends with Drake and Scott walking away. As of May 2022, the video has over a billion views.

== Live performances ==
Travis Scott performed the song at the 2018 MTV Video Music Awards and the Super Bowl LIII halftime show.

== Remixes and covers ==
On November 28, 2018, an electronic remix by American record producer Skrillex was released. The remix's accompanying audio and lyric videos were released to Scott's and Skrillex's YouTube channels on the same day. Skrillex would later release a previously unfinished version of his remix as "Baby Royal" on his fourth studio album, Fuck U Skrillex You Think Ur Andy Warhol but Ur Not!! <3, on April 1, 2025.

On February 28, 2020, Swae Lee released the single "Someone Said", based on his line from the song.

== Personnel ==
Credits adapted from Tidal and liner notes.

Performance

- Travis Scott – vocals, songwriting
- Drake – vocals, songwriting
- Swae Lee – additional vocals, songwriting
- Big Hawk – additional vocals, songwriting

Production

- Rogét Chahayed – production, songwriting (Part I)
- Hit-Boy – production, songwriting (Part I)
- OZ – production, songwriting (Part II)
- Cubeatz – production, songwriting (Part II)
- Tay Keith – production, songwriting (Part III)
- Mike Dean – production assistance, songwriting
- Mirsad Dervić – programming, songwriting
- Cydel Young – songwriting

Technical

- Travis Scott – recording engineer, mixing
- Ben Sedano – assistant engineer
- Jimmy Cash – assistant engineer
- Jon Scher – assistant engineer
- Sean Solymor – assistant engineer
- Mike Dean – mixing, mastering

Additional songwriting credits as on the samples: "I Wanna Rock" as performed by Luke, written by Luther Campbell, Harry Wayne Casey and Richard Finch; and "Gimme the Loot" as performed by the Notorious B.I.G., written by Christopher Wallace, Osten Harvey, Bryan Higgins, Trevor Smith, James Jackson, Malik Taylor, Keith Elam, Christopher Martin, Kamaal Fareed, Ali Shaheed Jones-Muhammad, Tyrone Taylor, Fred Scruggs, Kirk Jones and Chylow Parker.

== Track listing ==
=== A-side ===
1. "Sicko Mode" – 5:12

=== B-side ===
1. "Sicko Mode" (Skrillex Remix) – 5:05

== Charts ==
=== Weekly charts ===
Chart (2018–2021)	Peak position
Argentina (Argentina Hot 100)	87
Australia (ARIA)	6
Austria (Ö3 Austria Top 40)	29
Belgium (Ultratip Bubbling Under Flanders)	4
Belgium (Ultratop 50 Wallonia)	39
Canada Hot 100 (Billboard)	3
Czech Republic Singles Digital (ČNS IFPI)	20
Denmark (Tracklisten)	19
France (SNEP)	20
Germany (GfK)	43
Global 200 (Billboard)	70 (Note: The Global 200 launched in September 2020, well after the song's prime 2018–2019 charting period.)
Hungary (Single Top 40)	40
Hungary (Stream Top 40)	11
Ireland (IRMA)	11
Italy (FIMI)	10
Netherlands (Single Top 100)	35
New Zealand (Recorded Music NZ)	7
Norway (VG-lista)	22
Portugal (AFP)	8
Scottish Singles Sales (Official Charts)	52
Spain (Promusicae)	38
Sweden (Sverigetopplistan)	29
Switzerland (Schweizer Hitparade)	17
UK Singles (Official Charts)	9
UK Hip Hop/R&B (Official Charts)	2
US Billboard Hot 100	1
US Dance Club Songs (Billboard)	54
US Dance Airplay (Billboard)	10
US Hot R&B/Hip-Hop Songs (Billboard)	1
US Pop Airplay (Billboard)	10
US Rhythmic Airplay (Billboard)	1
US Rolling Stone Top 100	47

=== Year-end charts ===
Chart (2018)	Position
Australia (ARIA)	48
Canada (Canadian Hot 100)	51
Estonia (IFPI)	91
Portugal (AFP)	77
UK Singles (OCC)	94
US Billboard Hot 100	42
US Hot R&B/Hip-Hop Songs (Billboard)	21
US Rhythmic (Billboard)	27
Chart (2019)	Position
Australia (ARIA)	25
Canada (Canadian Hot 100)	13
Denmark (Tracklisten)	97
New Zealand (Recorded Music NZ)	27
Portugal (AFP)	75
UK Singles (OCC)	75
US Billboard Hot 100	9
US Dance/Mix Show Airplay (Billboard)	43
US Hot R&B/Hip-Hop Songs (Billboard)	6
US Mainstream Top 40 (Billboard)	32
US Rhythmic (Billboard)	7
US Rolling Stone Top 100	17
Chart (2020)	Position
Australia (ARIA)	86
Chart (2021)	Position
Global 200 (Billboard)	166
Portugal (AFP)	165

=== Decade-end charts ===
Chart (2010–2019)	Position
US Billboard Hot 100	16
US Hot R&B/Hip-Hop Songs (Billboard)	8

== Certifications ==
Region	Certification	Certified units/sales
Australia (ARIA)	9× Platinum	630,000^{‡}
Austria (IFPI Austria)	Platinum	30,000^{‡}
Brazil (Pro-Música Brasil)	3× Diamond	480,000^{‡}
Canada (Music Canada)	Diamond	800,000^{‡}
Denmark (IFPI Danmark)	2× Platinum	180,000^{‡}
France (SNEP)	Diamond	333,333^{‡}
Germany (BVMI)	Platinum	400,000^{‡}
Italy (FIMI)	2× Platinum	140,000^{‡}
Mexico (AMPROFON)	Diamond+3× Platinum	480,000^{‡}
New Zealand (RMNZ)	7× Platinum	210,000^{‡}
Poland (ZPAV)	4× Platinum	200,000^{‡}
Portugal (AFP)	5× Platinum	50,000^{‡}
Spain (Promusicae)	Platinum	40,000^{‡}
United Kingdom (BPI)	3× Platinum	1,800,000^{‡}
United States (RIAA)	16× Platinum	16,000,000^{‡}
Streaming
Greece (IFPI Greece)	2× Platinum	4,000,000^{†}
Sweden (GLF)	Gold	4,000,000^{†}
^{‡} Sales+streaming figures based on certification alone.^{†} Streaming-only figures based on certification alone.

== Release history ==
Region	Date	Format	Version	Label	Ref.
United States	August 21, 2018	Rhythmic contemporary radio	Original	Grand Hustle; Epic; Cactus Jack	
United States	August 21, 2018	Urban contemporary radio	Original	Grand Hustle; Epic; Cactus Jack	
Various	November 28, 2018	Digital download	Skrillex remix	Grand Hustle; Epic; Cactus Jack	

== See also ==
- List of highest-certified digital singles in the United States
