= Rich Slave =

- Standard cover art. Deluxe edition features a black and white cover.

Studio album by Young Dolph
- Released: August 14, 2020
- Length: 49:32
- Label: Paper Route Empire
- Producers: Bandplay; Beatmonster Marc; Cassius Jay; DJ Cyreen; Drumma Boy; Dunk Rock; Hunnit Band Yung; Juicy J; Montana Corleone; OG Ron C; Sosa808; Supah Mario; Trauma Tone; Yung Hurricane

Young Dolph chronology
Dum and Dummer (2019)	Rich Slave (2020)	Dum and Dummer 2 (2021)

Singles from Rich Slave
- 1. "RNB" Released: May 29, 2020; 2. "Blue Diamonds" Released: June 26, 2020; 3. "Death Row" Released: August 7, 2020; 4. "Large Amounts" Released: January 19, 2021

Rich Slave is the fifth solo studio album by American rapper Young Dolph and his last studio album to be released during his lifetime. It was released on August 14, 2020, through his label Paper Route Empire. The production on the album was primarily handled by Bandplay with additional production by Juicy J, Supah Mario, Cassius Jay, King MugZi and others. The album features guest appearances from G Herbo, Key Glock and Megan Thee Stallion. Dolph explained the album's title, stating "It's the reality of being Black in this country".

Rich Slave was preceded by four singles: "RNB" featuring Megan Thee Stallion, "Blue Diamonds", "Death Row" and "Large Amounts". The album received generally positive reviews from music critics and was a commercial success. It debuted at number four on the US Billboard 200, earning 65,000 album-equivalent units in its first week, marking Dolph's highest-charting project. It also charted at number 84 on the Canadian Albums Chart.

== Promotion ==
On August 2, 2020, Young Dolph announced that he would be releasing his fifth studio album, Rich Slave on August 14, 2020. He also made the album available for pre-order on all platforms including his website. Dolph also announced that he would be giving away his blue and tangerine coloured Lamborghini Aventador to a lucky fan who pre-ordered the album. He stated, "Last week I walked in the garage to get on my 4wheeler and I looked at my Lambo and said to myself 'Dolph u should give someone your aventador and let them enjoy it, u not doin nothin wit it'." The car's retail price was approximately valued at $417,826.

== Critical reception ==
Professional ratings
Review scores
Source	Rating
AllMusic	4/5 stars

The album Rich Slave was met with Critical Acclaim and has grown into a cult classic and is generally considered the Magnum Opus of Young Dolph Albums. Tom Breihan of Stereogum praised Young Dolph, labelling him as a "cult hero". Breihan also spoke on the album's political aspects and Dolph's use of the term "slave", saying "anytime a Black artist uses 'slave' in a title, a whole lot of history goes into it." Breihan described the album as incidentally political but not overstated, saying that "Dolph hints at that history all through the album." Breihan also praised the production, saying that "the beats on Rich Slave are big and warm and solid." Ultimately, Breihan said it "works because it's a strong rapper talking strong shit over strong beats." He also regarded it as "one of the most purely enjoyable rap records I've heard this year."

== Commercial performance ==
Rich Slave debuted at number four on the US Billboard 200 chart, earning 65,000 album-equivalent units (including 32,000 copies in pure album sales) in its first week. This became Young Dolph's second US top-ten debut on the chart and his highest first-week sales to date. Physical sales for the album were boosted by offering merchandise/album bundles via his website. The album also accumulated a total of 44.31 million on-demand streams of the set's songs.

== Track listing ==
No.	Title	Writer(s)	Producer(s)	Length
1.	"Hold Up Hold Up Hold Up"	Adolph Thornton Jr.	Bandplay	4:01
2.	"Black Friday"	Thornton Jr.	Young Dolph	2:01
3.	"To Be Honest"	Thornton Jr.	Juicy J	2:39
4.	"I See $'s"	Thornton Jr.	Bandplay; DJ Cyreen
5.	"Corduroy Houseshoes" (Skit)	Thornton Jr.	Young Dolph	2:22
6.	"What's da Bizness"	Thornton Jr.	Sosa 808	2:21
7.	"The Land"	Thornton Jr.	Sosa 808; Hunnit Band Yung	2:37
8.	"Death Row"	Thornton Jr.	Bandplay	3:12
9.	"Cray Cray"	Thornton Jr.	Bandplay	2:25
10.	"RNB" (featuring Megan Thee Stallion)	Thornton Jr.; Megan Pete; Jordan Houston; Willie Hutch	Juicy J; Sosa 808	3:31
11.	"Rich Slave"	Thornton Jr.	Drumma Boy	2:06
12.	"Until It Rot"	Thornton Jr.	Bandplay	2:53
13.	"Blue Diamonds"	Thornton Jr.	Sosa808	3:12
14.	"No Sense" (featuring Key Glock)	Thornton Jr.; Markeyvius Cathey	Supah Mario; Cassius Jay	2:20
15.	"Benz"	Thornton Jr.	Montana Corleone; Sosa 808	3:28
16.	"1 Scale" (featuring G Herbo)	Thornton Jr.; Herbert Wright III	Bandplay	2:56
Total length:				49:32

Rich Slave (Deluxe)
No.	Title	Writer(s)	Producer(s)	Length
17.	"Large Amounts"	Thornton Jr.	Bandplay	3:25
18.	"Fast"	Thornton Jr.	Bandplay; Yung Hurricane	3:46
19.	"Gimme My Bag"	Thornton Jr.	Bandplay; Dunk Rock	2:46
20.	"Green Light" (featuring Key Glock)	Thornton Jr.; Cathey	Bandplay	2:43
21.	"Scotch"	Thornton Jr.	Bandplay	3:21
22.	"Obey Your Thirst"	Thornton Jr.	Trauma Tone; OG Ron C; Beatmonster Marc	4:08
23.	"No Regrets" (featuring Kenny Muney)	Thornton Jr.; Kenny Muney	Bandplay	3:21
24.	"Buy My Way in Heaven"	Thornton Jr.		3:18
Total length:				1:11:40

== Charts ==
=== Weekly charts ===
Chart (2020)	Peak position
Canadian Albums (Billboard)	84
US Billboard 200	4
US Independent Albums (Billboard)	1
US Top R&B/Hip-Hop Albums (Billboard)	3

=== Year-end charts ===
Chart (2020)	Position
US Top R&B/Hip-Hop Albums (Billboard)	86
US Independent Albums (Billboard)	35
US Current Albums (Billboard)	119

== Certifications ==
Region	Certification	Certified units/sales
United States (RIAA)	Gold	500,000^{‡}
^{‡} Sales+streaming figures based on certification alone.
