= Ambition for Cash =

2021 single by Key Glock

Single by Key Glock

from the album Yellow Tape 2
- Released: October 1, 2021
- Genre: Southern hip-hop; trap
- Length: 2:23
- Label: Paper Route Empire
- Songwriters: Markevius Cathey; Brytavious Chambers; Kevin Gomringer; Tim Gomringer
- Producers: Tay Keith; Cubeatz

Key Glock singles chronology
"West Bank" (2021)	"Ambition for Cash" (2021)	"Da Truth" (2021)

Music video
- "Ambition for Cash" on YouTube

"Ambition for Cash" is a song by American rapper Key Glock, released on October 1, 2021 as the lead single from his second studio album Yellow Tape 2 (2021). It was produced by Tay Keith and Cubeatz.

== Composition ==
The song contains a flute instrumental with thumping 808s, over which Key Glock raps about his ambition to continue accumulating wealth for his family and never stop working hard. He also compares himself to NBA players James Harden and Larry Bird.

== Music video ==
An official music video was released on October 7, 2021. It sees Key Glock committing a bank robbery with his associates, including Paper Route Empire signee and rapper Snupe Bandz, first posing as customers at the financial institution. Masked and armed with automatic firearms, Key Glock and his crew arrive outside the building at Peachtree Street in a Chevrolet Impala convertible. They shoot into the ceiling and take the security guards and employees hostage, as a bank clerk takes them to the safe at gunpoint and empties the vault for them. In the end, they escape from the police and destroy their car by fire.

== Acoustic version ==
On April 27, 2022, Key Glock released a visual of a live acoustic performance, which shows him performing the song on Doyers Street in Chinatown, Manhattan as he is backed by seven flute players.

== Charts ==
Chart performance for "Ambition for Cash"
Chart (2021)	Peak position
US Bubbling Under Hot 100 Singles (Billboard)	11

== Certifications ==
Region	Certification	Certified units/sales
United States (RIAA)	2× Platinum	2,000,000^{‡}
^{‡} Sales+streaming figures based on certification alone.
