= Nonstop (song) =

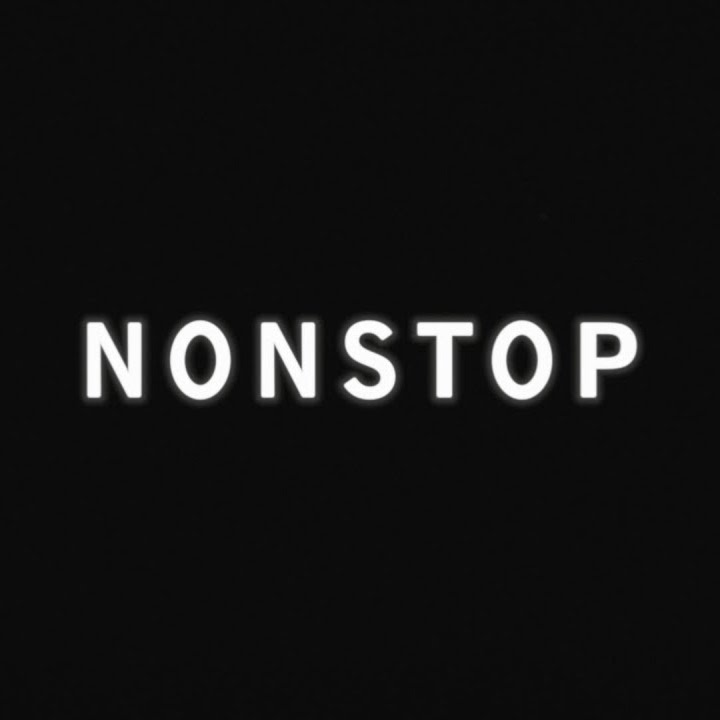

Single by Drake

from the album Scorpion
- Released: July 31, 2018
- Studio: Ritz Carlton, Toronto, ON
- Genre: Hip hop; trap
- Length: 3:58
- Label: Young Money; Cash Money; Republic
- Songwriters: Aubrey Graham; Brytavious Chambers; Dion Wilson
- Producer: Tay Keith

Drake singles chronology
| "In My Feelings" (2018) | "Nonstop" (2018) | "Sicko Mode" (2018) |

Music video
- "Nonstop" on YouTube

"Nonstop" is a song by Canadian musician Drake from his fifth studio album, Scorpion (2018). It was released as the sixth single from the album on July 31, 2018. The song was produced by Tay Keith, with co-production handled by No I.D. and additional production by Noel Cadastre.

"Nonstop" was critically well-received, being labeled one of Scorpion's best tracks by several critics, even cynics of the album. Commercially, it has reached number one in Canada as well as the top ten in Australia, Greece, Ireland, New Zealand, Portugal, Switzerland, and the United Kingdom; along with reaching top 5 in the United States, prior to being released as a single. Additionally, "Nonstop" was the most streamed song in the US during the first week of Scorpion's release. The song gained renewed popularity in 2020, after being used in viral TikTok videos.

== Background ==
On July 13, 2018, BlocBoy JB released his own remix of "Nonstop" on YouTube.

== Production and composition ==
"Nonstop," recorded by Drake near the end of Scorpion's production, is a trap rap song with the chorus line "My head is spinnin', from smokin' the chicken, the bass is kickin" sampled from DJ Squeeky and Mack Daddy Ju's song "My Head Is Spinning" (1995). Due to the sample being by artists from Memphis, Tennessee, multiple journalists have categorized the use of the sample as a reference to Drake's Memphis influences. He references LeBron James going back and forth wearing "6" and "23" shirts to symbolize his sudden rise to stardom. Journalist Dee Lockett suggested the line "Yeah I'm light skinned, but I'm still a dark nigga" referenced a photo of Drake in blackface used by Pusha-T on the cover of his diss track "The Story of Adidon."

== Critical reception ==
Some reviewers of Scorpion, including its detractors, mentioned "Nonstop" as one of its top tracks. Caitlin White Uproxx wrote its upbeat nature made it one of the best parts of a record of mostly "joyless, moody songs," describing it as "almost a banger" and noting its many "hilarious lines." A top-five track list from Business Insider described it as "the sharpest possible version of his uniquely corny bravado." The Ringer in 2018 ranked "Nonstop" the 105th all-time Drake song, listing it in the field of "Songs That You Would Not Quote on Your Instagram." In 2020, Billboard, ranking "Nonstop" the 47th best of Drake's 209 Hot 100 hits, called it "one of the nastiest tracks the rapper's ever put out," elaborating that "it breathes an air of invincibility into you the second the bass starts rolling." Some reviewers noted Tay Keith's "infectious" instrumental, especially its bass line, and Drake's versatility, noting his attempt at replicating flows from contemporaneous rappers. Patrick Lyons and Craig Jenkins, however, was critical of his tries to copy current trends, with Jenkins categorizing "Nonstop" as "a Playboi Carti song on a Klonopin" and Lyons panning "his use of a young producer and somewhat lazy 21 Savage flows."

== Commercial performance ==
When first released on Spotify as part of Scorpion, "Nonstop" was the most streamed song from the album on its first day, racking 9,298,297 streams (5,749,019 in the United States alone); it broke a record set by "Look What You Made Me Do" by Taylor Swift which garnered around eight million in a day.

"Nonstop" entered the US Billboard Hot 100 chart dated July 14, 2018 at number 2, tying as Drake's third number two-charting single as a lead act with "Best I Ever Had" and "Hotline Bling" which reached number two in 2009 and 2015, respectively. The song debuted and peaked at number two for one week, behind Drake's own single "Nice for What". "Nonstop" remained in the top ten of this chart for one week before dropping out on July 21, 2018.

In Drake's native Canada, "Nonstop" debuted at number 1 on the Canadian Hot 100, becoming Drake's fifth number-one single on the chart and tying as his third number one single from his Scorpion album, along with "God's Plan" and "Nice for What". It was later unseated from the top spot on the issue dated July 21, 2018 by Drake's follow-up single "In My Feelings".

In the United Kingdom, "Nonstop" peaked at number 4 on the UK Singles Chart. On September 14, 2018, "Nonstop" received a silver certification by the British Phonographic Industry.

== Music video ==
The music video for "Nonstop" was released on July 27, 2018, exclusively on Apple Music before being uploaded to Drake's YouTube channel on August 3; while previous videos for Scorpion tracks ("God's Plan," "Nice For What" and "I'm Upset") were directed by Karena Evans and high-concept, "Nonstop" is a much more realistic video directed by Theo Skudra and filmed in London. It begins with footage from Drake's performance at the 2018 Wireless Festival before he goes out clubbing, drinks tea on top of a building, and rides throughout London on a double-decker bus. It features cameos from French Montana, Quavo, and Noah "40" Shebib. "Nonstop" was Skudra's first Drake music video to be documentary-style, which would be true for the director's later videos for "Chicago Freestyle," "War," and "When to Say When." According to Skudra, "It kind of is the epitome of our working relationship. To be able to capture these parties or these moments, they're just things that are hard to find in a director-artist relationship." Drake came up with the idea of filming the video at one of his London events, while the double-decker bus scene was done out of a joke made by a make-up artist near the end of shooting. The part where Drake drinks tea on a hotel rooftop became a meme on social media upon the video's release.

== Flip The Switch challenge ==
In 2020, the song resurfaced due to a TikTok meme challenge. The challenge involves two people swapping clothes and roles with each other and then switching the light off, proceeding to "go wild" once Drake raps, "Look, I just flipped the switch (flipped, flipped)." One of the most popular videos are of US senator and former 2020 presidential candidate Elizabeth Warren and actress Kate McKinnon in a dressing room at Saturday Night Live.

== Personnel ==
Credits adapted from the album's liner notes and Tidal.

- Noah Shebib – recording
- Noel "Gadget" Campbell – mixing
- Greg Moffet – mixing assistance
- Ronald Moonoo – mixing assistance
- Harley Arsenault – mixing assistance
- Noel Cadastre – production, recording
- No I.D. – production
- Tay Keith – production

== Charts ==
=== Weekly charts ===
| Chart (2018) | Peak position |
|---|---|
| Australia (ARIA) | 5 |
| Austria (Ö3 Austria Top 40) | 21 |
| Canada Hot 100 (Billboard) | 1 |
| Czech Republic Singles Digital (ČNS IFPI) | 28 |
| Denmark (Tracklisten) | 19 |
| France (SNEP) | 34 |
| Germany (GfK) | 28 |
| Greece International Digital Singles (IFPI) | 3 |
| Hungary (Stream Top 40) | 19 |
| Ireland (IRMA) | 5 |
| Italy (FIMI) | 42 |
| Lithuania (AGATA) | 46 |
| Netherlands (Single Top 100) | 15 |
| New Zealand (Recorded Music NZ) | 8 |
| Norway (VG-lista) | 26 |
| Portugal (AFP) | 6 |
| Scotland Singles (OCC) | 79 |
| Slovakia Singles Digital (ČNS IFPI) | 11 |
| Sweden (Sverigetopplistan) | 17 |
| Switzerland (Schweizer Hitparade) | 10 |
| UK Singles (OCC) | 4 |
| UK Hip Hop/R&B (OCC) | 2 |
| US Billboard Hot 100 | 2 |
| US Hot R&B/Hip-Hop Songs (Billboard) | 2 |
| US Rhythmic Airplay (Billboard) | 2 |

=== Year-end charts ===
| Chart (2018) | Position |
|---|---|
| Australia Hip-Hop/R&B Singles (ARIA) | 37 |
| Canada (Canadian Hot 100) | 62 |
| Portugal (AFP) | 120 |
| US Billboard Hot 100 | 52 |
| US Hot R&B/Hip-Hop Songs (Billboard) | 27 |
| US Rhythmic (Billboard) | 28 |
| Chart (2019) | Position |
| US Rolling Stone Top 100 | 79 |

== Certifications ==
| Region | Certification | Certified units/sales |
|---|---|---|
| Australia (ARIA) | 5× Platinum | 350,000^{‡} |
| Brazil (Pro-Música Brasil) | Diamond | 160,000^{‡} |
| Canada (Music Canada) | Platinum | 80,000^{‡} |
| Denmark (IFPI Danmark) | Platinum | 90,000^{‡} |
| France (SNEP) | Platinum | 200,000^{‡} |
| Germany (BVMI) | Gold | 200,000^{‡} |
| Italy (FIMI) | Gold | 25,000^{‡} |
| Poland (ZPAV) | Gold | 25,000^{‡} |
| Portugal (AFP) | Platinum | 10,000^{‡} |
| Spain (Promusicae) | Gold | 30,000^{‡} |
| United Kingdom (BPI) | 2× Platinum | 1,200,000^{‡} |
| United States (RIAA) | Diamond | 10,000,000^{‡} |
^{‡} Sales+streaming figures based on certification alone.

== Release history ==
| Country | Date | Format | Label(s) | Ref. |
|---|---|---|---|---|
| United States | July 31, 2018 | Rhythmic contemporary | Young Money; Cash Money; Republic | |

== See also ==
- List of Canadian Hot 100 number-one singles of 2018
