= Kevo Muney =

American rapper and singer (born c.2001)

- Born: Kevione Austin c. 2001 (age 24–25); Memphis, Tennessee, U.S.
- Genres: Hip-hop, soul
- Occupations: Rapper, singer
- Instrument: Vocals
- Label: Atlantic
- Website: kevomuneymusic.com

Kevione Austin (born c. 2001), known by his stage name Kevo Muney, is an American rapper and singer from South Memphis, Tennessee. He is signed to Atlantic Records.

== Biography ==
Austin was born c. 2001, in South Memphis, Memphis, Tennessee, the youngest of eight siblings. He grew up listening to soul music and sang at his church beginning at age six. He originally sang on Beale Street for money. As a teenager, he began rapping and posted his freestyles onto Facebook. He gained local popularity from his mixtape I Grind, his 2018 song "Back Against The Wall", on his mixtape Who Am I (Reloaded), and his guest appearance on "Deep End" by fellow Memphis rapper Fat Wizza.

By 2019, Austin had received cosigns from Chief Keef, Gunna, Kevin Gates, Lil Baby, and Tay Keith, among others; he signed with Atlantic Records the same year, which was confirmed in early November. He was featured on Sprite Way, an advertising campaign of The Coca-Cola Company which features rising musicians. His debut mixtape with Atlantic, Baby G.O.A.T., was announced alongside the release of his debut single with the label, "Everythang Changed". The mixtape released on December 13, 2019, and contained guest appearances from BlocBoy JB and Tay Keith. Its cover went viral online for depicting an anthropomorphic goat giving birth to Muney. In 2023, Drew Gadbois of The Michigan Daily described the cover as "the kind of album art that perfectly toes the line between utter masterpiece and complete travesty".

In February 2020, Austin released the song "Leave Some Day", which later received a remix featuring a guest appearance from Lil Durk.

== Discography ==
- Who Am I (Reloaded) (2018)
- Baby G.O.A.T. (2019)
- Leave Some Day (2020)
- Because I Love Y'all (2021)
- Lucille's Grandson (2021)
- Kevo Muney x Lil Muney (2022)
- I Admit I Was Wrong (2025)
- UnreleasedMuney (2025)
