= Key Glock =

American rapper (born 1997)

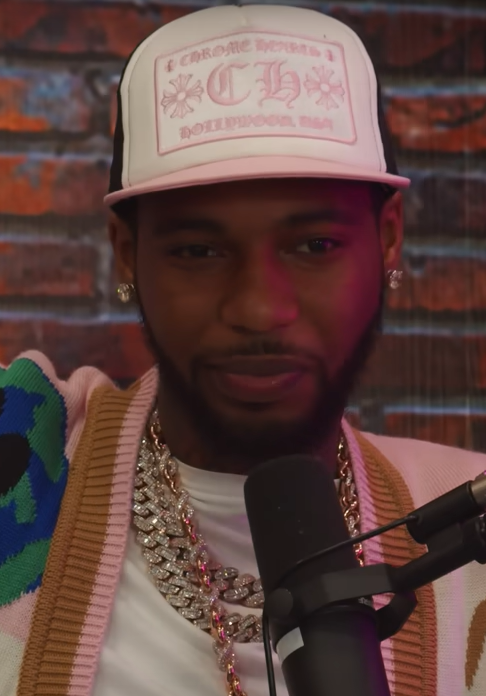
- Key Glock in 2024

Background information
- Also known as: Glizock, G-Lock, Glock
- Born: Markeyvius LaShun Cathey; August 3, 1997 (age 29); Memphis, Tennessee, U.S.
- Genres: Southern hip hop; trap; Memphis rap; gangsta rap
- Occupations: Rapper; songwriter; record producer
- Years active: 2016–present
- Labels: Paper Route Empire; Empire; Republic
- Website: keyglock.com

Markeyvius LaShun Cathey (born August 3, 1997), known professionally as Key Glock, is an American rapper, songwriter, and record producer. The cousin of late Memphis rapper Young Dolph, Cathey signed with his record label, Paper Route Empire, to release his commercial mixtape, Glock Season (2017). His debut studio album, Yellow Tape (2020), peaked at number 14 on the Billboard 200 and received gold certification by the Recording Industry Association of America (RIAA). His second album, Yellow Tape 2 (2021), peaked at number seven on the chart and spawned the multi-platinum-certified single "Ambition for Cash", as well as "Proud", which was released in the wake of Dolph's death and marked his first entry on the Billboard Hot 100. His third album, Glockoma 2 (2023), spawned the sleeper hit single "Let's Go"—his second entry on the chart.

== Early life ==
Markeyvius LaShun Cathey was born in South Memphis on August 3, 1997. When he was 20 months old, his mother Tameika Cathey was sent to prison, where she would be for the next 15 years. His father was in and out of his life, so he was raised by his grandmother and his aunt. According to Cathey, he and his grandmother occasionally visited his mother in prison during his youth. At 18 years old, he was charged with three counts of aggravated assault related to his involvement in a shooting. Music was a distraction from his oftentimes tumultuous life.

Cathey said he grew up listening to Gucci Mane, Lil Wayne, and cites Three 6 Mafia as his largest influence. He was also a big fan of Project Pat, whom he describes as the "Drake of Memphis". According to Glock, Pat's songs "If You Ain't From My Hood" and "Gorilla Pimp" changed his life. The latter's chorus inspired one of his breakout songs, "Dig That". The first track that Glock recorded himself was a freestyle of DJ Drama's 2011 song "Ain't No Way Around It".

== Career ==
Glock released his debut mixtape Whole Lotta Errthang in 2016. In 2017, Young Dolph signed Key Glock to the Paper Route Empire label. On January 25 of that year, Glock released his debut single "Racks Today" featuring American rapper Jay Fizzle. On June 16, 2017, Glock released his second mixtape, Glock Season, under the label. His collaborative album Dum and Dummer with Young Dolph reached number eight on the Billboard 200. Young Dolph's "Major" featuring Key Glock reached number 47 on the Hot R&B/Hip-Hop Songs chart.

Following the release of his collaborative album Dum and Dummer with Young Dolph, he went on a European tour across Manchester and London. The pair brought out UK rapper Blade Brown as a supporting act. The two proceeded to start the "No Rules" Tour in 2020, beginning on February 5 in Seattle.

On January 31, Key Glock released his debut studio album titled Yellow Tape, which debuted at number 14 on the Billboard 200. On May 22, 2020, Key Glock released his sixth mixtape, Son of a Gun, again with no features.

On March 5, 2021, Key Glock and Young Dolph released the single, "Aspen", and announced the release of their second collaborative album, Dum and Dummer 2, due for release on March 26, 2021. It is a sequel to 2019's Dum and Dummer. The project's cartoon artwork references Beavis & Butthead. On November 5, 2021, Glock released his second studio album Yellow Tape 2, a sequel to Yellow Tape.

On January 18, 2022, Key Glock released the song "Proud", a tribute to Young Dolph. It is included on the Dolph tribute compilation Long Live Young Dolph, released January 21, 2022.

On February 24, 2023, Key Glock released his third studio album, Glockoma 2. It is the sequel to his 2018 mixtape Glockoma.

On March 13, 2025, Key Glock signed to Republic Records.

On May 2, 2025, after facing several delays, Key Glock released his fourth studio album and major-label debut album, Glockaveli.

== Personal life ==
Key Glock is the cousin by marriage of Young Dolph, who was murdered in November 2021. Following Dolph's death, in a since-deleted Instagram post, Key Glock called him "my lefthand man, my brother, my cousin, and my mentor." The same month Young Dolph died he got a tattoo of Young Dolph.

== Discography ==
=== Studio albums ===
List of studio albums, with selected chart positions and certifications
Title	Album details	Peak chart positions				Certifications
Title	Album details	US	US R&B/HH	US Rap	CAN	Certifications
Yellow Tape	Released: January 31, 2020; Label: Paper Route Empire; Formats: Digital download, streaming	14	8	8	—	RIAA: Gold
Yellow Tape 2	Released: November 5, 2021; Label: Paper Route Empire, Empire; Formats: CD, LP, cassette, digital download, streaming	7	4	3	94	
Glockoma 2	Released: February 24, 2023; Label: Paper Route Empire, Empire; Formats: CD, LP, digital download, streaming	13	8	5	—	RIAA: Gold
Glockaveli	Released: May 2, 2025; Label: Paper Route Empire, Republic; Formats: CD, LP, digital download, streaming	8	4	2	—	
Project X	Released: June 19, 2026; Label: Paper Route Empire, Republic; Formats: CD, LP, digital download, streaming	29	11	6	—	
"—" denotes releases that did not chart or were not released.

=== Compilation albums ===
Title	Album details	Peak chart positions
Title	Album details	US
Paper Route Illuminati (with Young Dolph and Paper Route Empire)	Released: July 30, 2021; Label: Paper Route Empire; Format: Digital download, streaming	22

=== Mixtapes ===
Title	Mixtape details	Peak chart positions			Certifications
Title	Mixtape details	US	US R&B/HH	CAN	Certifications
Whole Lotta Errthang	Released: May 26, 2016; Label: Self-released; Format: Digital download, streaming	—	—	—	
Glock Season	Released: June 16, 2017; Label: Paper Route Empire; Format: Digital download, streaming	—	—	—	
Glock Bond	Released: February 1, 2018; Label: Paper Route Empire; Format: Digital download, streaming	101	—	—	
Glockoma	Released: November 23, 2018; Label: Paper Route Empire; Format: Digital download, streaming	34	17	—	
Dum and Dummer (with Young Dolph)	Released: July 26, 2019; Label: Paper Route Empire, Empire; Format: CD, digital download, streaming	8	4	83	RIAA: Gold
Son of a Gun	Released: May 22, 2020; Label: Paper Route Empire; Format: Digital download, streaming	37	24	—	
Dum and Dummer 2 (with Young Dolph)	Released: March 26, 2021; Label: Paper Route Empire, Empire; Format: CD, LP, digital download, streaming	8	5	—	
"—" denotes a recording that did not chart or was not released in that territory.

=== Extended plays ===
Title	EP details	Peak chart positions
Title	EP details	US
PRE5L	Released: November 18, 2022; Label: Paper Route Empire; Format: Digital download, streaming	190

=== Singles ===
==== As lead artist ====
Title	Year	Peak chart positions		Certifications	Album
Title	Year	US	US R&B/HH	Certifications	Album
"Racks Today" (featuring Jay Fizzle)	2017	—	—		Glock Season
"Russian Cream"	2018	—	—	RIAA: 3× Platinum	Glock Bond
"Yea"	2018	—	—		Glockoma
"Since 6ix"	2018	—	—	RIAA: Gold	Glockoma
"Spazzing Out"	2019	—	—		Non-album single
"Baby Joker" (with Young Dolph)	2019	—	—		Dum and Dummer
"Look at They Face"	2020	—	—	RIAA: Gold	Yellow Tape
"I'm Just Sayin'"	2020	—	—		Yellow Tape
"Never Change"	2020	—	—		Non-album singles
"Off the Porch"	2021	—	—		Non-album singles
"Case Closed" (with Young Dolph)	2021	—	—		Dum and Dummer 2
"I'm the Type"	2021	—	—		Dum and Dummer 2
"Aspen" (with Young Dolph)	2021	—	—		Dum and Dummer 2
"Penguins" (with Young Dolph)	2021	— (Note: "Penguins" did not enter the Billboard Hot 100, but peaked at number 15 on the Bubbling Under Hot 100 chart.)	—		Dum and Dummer 2
"Ambition for Cash"	2021	— (Note: "Ambition for Cash" did not enter the Billboard Hot 100, but peaked at number 11 on the Bubbling Under Hot 100 chart.)	—	RIAA: 2× Platinum	Yellow Tape 2
"Da Truth"	2021	—	—		Yellow Tape 2
"Proud" (with Paper Route Empire)	2022	73	28		Long Live Young Dolph
"Pain Killers"	2022	—	—		Yellow Tape 2
"Diapers"	2022	—	—		Non-album single
"No Limit" (with Money Man and Babyface Ray featuring Bleu)	2022	—	—		Madden NFL 23
"From Nothing"	2022	—	—		Glockoma 2
"9 in My Hand (Fast X Remix)" (with Kordhell)	2023	—	—		Fast X
"Let's Go" (solo or remix with Young Dolph)	2023	59	23	RIAA: Platinum	Glockoma 2
"No Sweat"	2025	—	44		Glockaveli
"The Grinch"	2025	—	50		Glockaveli
"She Ready"	2025	91	17		Glockaveli
"Set in Stone"	2025	—	41		Glockaveli: All Eyez on Key
"Hang wit a Bad Bitch" (with Sexyy Red)	2026	— (Note: "Hang wit a Bad Bitch" did not enter the Billboard Hot 100, but peaked at number 6 on the Bubbling Under Hot 100 chart.)	23		Yo Favorite Trappa Favorite Rappa

==== As featured artist ====
Title	Year	Peak chart positions		Certifications	Album
Title	Year	US	US R&B/HH	Certifications	Album
"Major" (Young Dolph featuring Key Glock)	2018	— (Note: "Major" did not enter the Billboard Hot 100, but peaked at number one on the Bubbling Under Hot 100 chart.)	47	RIAA: 3× Platinum	Role Model
"Lifers" (Gucci Mane featuring Foogiano, Ola Runt and Key Glock)	2020	—	—		So Icy Summer
"No Sense" (Young Dolph featuring Key Glock)	2020	—	—		Rich Slave
"Blood All on It" (Gucci Mane featuring Key Glock and Young Dolph)	2022	98	32		So Icy Gang: The ReUp
"Walkin" (Remix) (Denzel Curry featuring Key Glock)	2022	—	—		Non-album single

=== Other charted and certified songs ===
List of other charted and certified songs
Title	Year	Peak chart positions			Certifications	Album
Title	Year	US	US R&B/HH	NZ Hot	Certifications	Album
"Gang Shit No Lame Shit"	2018	—	—	—	RIAA: Gold	Glockoma
"Water on Water" (with Young Dolph)	2019	—	—	—	RIAA: Platinum	Dum and Dummer
"1 Hell of a Life" (with Young Dolph)	2019	—	—	—	RIAA: Gold	Dum and Dummer
"Monster"	2019	—	—	—	RIAA: Gold	Dum and Dummer
"Word on the Streets"	2020	—	—	—	RIAA: Platinum	Yellow Tape
"Mr. Glock"	2020	—	—	—	RIAA: Platinum	Yellow Tape
"Dough"	2020	—	—	—	RIAA: Platinum	Yellow Tape
"Something Bout Me"	2021	— (Note: "Something Bout Me" did not enter the Billboard Hot 100, but peaked at number 2 on the Bubbling Under Hot 100 chart.)	—	—		Yellow Tape 2
"Ungrateful" (Megan Thee Stallion featuring Key Glock)	2022	82	29	28		Traumazine
"Die Trying"	2022	—	—	—	RIAA: Gold	PRE5L
"Dirt"	2023	88	32	—		Glockoma 2
"Glockaveli"	2025	—	43	—		Glockaveli
"Blue Devil"	2025	— (Note: "Blue Devil" did not enter the Billboard Hot 100, but peaked at number 14 on the Bubbling Under Hot 100 chart.)	25	37		Glockaveli
"Run It Up" (with Offset)	2025	—	32	—		Kiari
"Face Down"	2026	— (Note: "Face Down" did not enter the Billboard Hot 100, but peaked at number 16 on the Bubbling Under Hot 100 chart.)	38	40		Project X
"—" denotes a recording that did not chart or was not released in that territory.
