= Yellow Tape 2 =

2021 album by Key Glock

Studio album by Key Glock
- Released: November 5, 2021
- Genre: Hip-hop
- Length: 53:33
- Label: Paper Route Empire
- Producer: BandPlay; CLDHRT; CuBeatz; Dun Deal; Figurez Made It; HitThaGNote; Juicy J; King Wonka; Little Island; Mannie iL; Montana Corleone; Seth the Chef; Shaz; Sosa 808; Tay Keith; That Boy Daymon; Triple G Ty

Key Glock chronology
Yellow Tape (2020)	Yellow Tape 2 (2021)	Glockoma 2 (2023)

Singles from Me vs. Myself
- 1. "Ambition for Cash" Released: October 1, 2021; 2. "Da Truth" Released: October 15, 2021; 3. "Pain Killers" Released: March 10, 2022

Yellow Tape 2 is the second studio album by American rapper Key Glock, released on November 5, 2021 through Paper Route Empire. The deluxe edition was released on March 25, 2022. The album peaked at number seven on the US Billboard 200.

== Background ==
Yellow Tape 2 is a sequel to Key Glock's debut studio album Yellow Tape (2020). In an interview with HotNewHipHop, Glock stated:

I never planned on even doing a sequel, but it's more of, like, a statement. That color, it was my great grandmother's favorite color. Y'all look at it like it's yellow. I look at it like it's gold, 'cause I'm a player. But I just had to keep it going because the first one made so much of a statement, and I had to let 'em know it's actually yellow tape. When you see yellow tape, you know what it means– caution, beware, something dumb happened, something about to happen. But I'm letting you know it's still yellow tape – this shit still happening, still about to happen. Like for real.

== Singles ==
"Ambition for Cash" was released on October 1, 2021 as the album's lead single. "Da Truth" was released on October 15, 2021 as the album's second single. "Pain Killers" was released on March 10, 2022, as the lead single from the deluxe version and the third single overall.

== Critical reception ==
Professional ratings
Review scores
Source	Rating
AllMusic	3/5 stars
HipHopDX	3.8/5
Pitchfork	7.4/10

The album received generally positive reviews from critics. Tom Breihan of Stereogum wrote that it "is nothing fancy, and that's what's good about it. Glock makes tough, unpretentious Memphis rider music. He's got a great ear for beats and a great understanding of how to make his deep, slurry voice sound good over them." Rose Lilah of HotNewHipHop praised the album's production, as well as Glock's "willingness to adopt and try out different cadences and new flows" and having no reliance on guest artists. Mackenzie Cummings-Grady of HipHopDX stated, "Glock sounds right at home rapping over a Hypnotize Minds-inspired barrage of piano and drum kicks, but it's Glock's knack for experimentation and transparency that makes his songs deceptively hard to figure out and impossible to ignore. The best part about Yellow Tape 2 is that it's clear from his eye for specific detail Glock isn't lying. Just ask his community about him."

== Track listing ==
All tracks are written by Markeyvius Cathey.

Yellow Tape track listing
No.	Title	Producer(s)	Length
1.	"Something Bout Me"	Tay Keith	2:43
2.	"Channel 5"	BandPlay; Triple G Ty	3:09
3.	"Bill Gates"	Buddah Bless; Seth the Chef	2:57
4.	"!!! (Don't Know Who to Trust)"	Little Island	2:23
5.	"Juicemane"	BandPlay	2:59
6.	"Tony"	Sosa 808; Montana Corleone	2:48
7.	"Ambition for Cash"	Tay Keith; CuBeatz	2:23
8.	"Ya Feel Me"	BandPlay	2:41
9.	"Can't Switch"	BandPlay	2:34
10.	"The 1"	BandPlay	2:26
11.	"Quarterback"	Dun Deal; Mannie iL; Shaz	2:33
12.	"Da Truth"	Pyrex	2:46
13.	"Check This Out"	Kill	3:07
14.	"From the Bottom"	Figurez Made It; King Wonka	2:47
15.	"Luv a Thug"	BandPlay; CLDHRT	2:25
16.	"Understood"	BandPlay	2:37
17.	"Eve"	Tay Keith; BandPlay	2:03
18.	"Toolie"	CLDHRT	2:17
19.	"U & I Know"	HitThaGNote; That Boy Daymon	2:35
20.	"Gangsta"	Juicy J	3:12
Total length:			53:33

All tracks are written by Markeyvius LaShun Cathey.

Deluxe edition track listing
No.	Title	Producer(s)	Length
1.	"Grammys"	Figurez Made It; King Wonka	2:57
2.	"No Rap Cap"	YNK on the drums; HitThaGNote; Morello	2:15
3.	"No Choice"	Tedd Boyd; Little Island	2:47
4.	"I Be"	BandPlay	3:13
5.	"Gucci & Dolph"	BandPlay	3:22
6.	"Play for Keeps"	Gunboi; PVLACE; Sledgren	2:58
7.	"Proud"	BandPlay	3:04
8.	"Pain Killers"	Gunboi; PVLACE; Sledgren	2:38
9.	"GMFB"	Yung Hurricane	2:43
10.	"No Love"	Blazerfxme; Tady Fletcher; Aimonmyneck	3:20
Total length:			60:22

== Charts ==
Chart performance for Yellow Tape
Chart (2021)	Peak position
Canadian Albums (Billboard)	94
US Billboard 200	7
US Top R&B/Hip-Hop Albums (Billboard)	4
