= Claudio Kevo Cavallini =

Italian sculptor

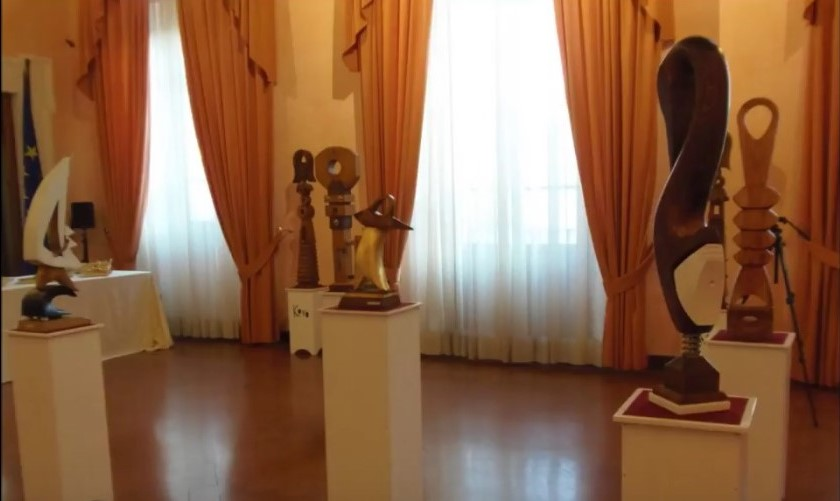
- Mostra Claudio Kevo Cavallini
- Born: 24 November 1952; Florence
- Died: 20 October 2015 (aged 62); Florence
- Known for: Sculpture
- Notable work: "Christ with arms raised"
- Website: http://www.kevo-firenze.it/

Claudio Kevo Cavallini (born 24 November 1952 in Florence – 20 October 2015) was an Italian sculptor. His nickname was "Kevo" with which he signed his works. At the age of 50, Claudio discovered that he could make sculptural forms from wood.

In 2012, he displayed his solo exhibition titled "A modern fairytale" in Pontassieve. His most recognized work, "Christ with arms raised", is on display permanently at the sanctuary of the Madonna del Sasso in territory of Pontassieve in Florence. In 2015 his work "Migranti", was exhibited in Pontassieve in the Sala dell'Eroine.

== Art exhibitions ==
- Exhibition "Gattart", Firenze, Museo Bellini, 2008
- Prize "Artisti allo sbaraglio", Bagni di Lucca, Regio Casinò, first place, 2008
- Exhibition "L'arte nella natura", Campi Bisenzio, Hotel West Florence, 2008
- Exhibition "Tracce d'autore", Zola Predosa, Admiral Park Hotel, 2008
- Exhibition "Gattart Fiora Leone", Firenze, Palagio di Parte Guelfa, 2009
- Prize "Città di Montecatini", Montecatini Terme, Comune, quarto premio, 2009
- Exhibition "Mostra d'arte contemporanea", Rimini, Galleria d'arte Malatestiana2009
- Exhibition "Arte contemporanea italiana", Firenze, Galleria La Pergola Arte, 2009
- Exhibition "La Pergola Arte a Palazzo", Firenze, Palazzo Medici Riccardi, 2009
- Exhibition "Arcadia mostra d'arte contemporanea", Pitigliano, Granai Fortezza Orsini, 2009
- Solo Exhibition "Kevo espone", Montecatini Terme, Casa del Pittore dello Scultore e del poeta, 2009
- Exhibition "Contemporanea Arte in Movimento", Firenze, Galleria La Pergola Arte, 2009
- Exhibition "100 artisti per 100 botteghe", Firenze, via Gioberti, 2009
- Prize "XXVII Premio Firenze", Firenze, 2009
- "Artexpò", Pitigliano, Granai Fortezza Orsini, 2009
- Exhibition "100% Nero Fondente", Impruneta, Galleria IAC, 2010
- Exhibition "Pisartexpò", Pisa, Stazione Leopolda, 2010
- Prize "XXV Premio Italia per le arti visive", Capraia Fiorentina, ex Fornace Pasquinucci, 2010
- Prize "Piccolo Formato" La Pergola Arte, Firenze, Auditorium Cassa di Risparmio, secondo premio, 2010
- Exhibition "Dedicated to... Paolo Baracchi", Firenze, Galleria Gadarte, 2010
- Exhibition "Passeggiando nell'arte", Sorano, Fortezza Orsini, 2010
- Exhibition "Tutti assieme cromaticamente", Empoli, Palazzo Ghibellino, 2010
- Exhibition "III Mostra arte contemporanea", Pitigliano, Granai Fortezza Orsini, 2010
- "Arte in Fiera", Longarone, con la Galleria del Candelaio, 2010
- Exhibition "100 Artisti per 100 botteghe", Firenze, via Gioberti, 2010
- Exhibition "Viaggio nel contemporaneo", Firenze, Albergaccio del Machiavelli, 2010
- Prize "XXVIII Premio Firenze", Firenze, finalista, 2010
- "Artexpò 2010", Pitigliano, Granai Fortezza Orsini, 2010
- Exhibition "Gattart Fiora Leone", Firenze, Antichità dei Fossi, 2011
- Exhibition "Passeggiando nell'arte", Sorano, Sale del Mastio, Fortezza Orsini, 2011
- Exhibition "Arte in Rugapiana – I fantastici 4", Cortona, Palazzo Ferretti, 2011
- Solo Exhibition Festa dei Democratici, Molin del Piano, Circolo La Torretta, 2011
- "Immagina – Arte in Fiera", Reggio Emilia, Salone Fiere, 2011
- Exhibition "Viaggio nel contemporaneo", Piancastagnaio, Hotel Miramonti, 2011
- Exhibition "Tanto di cappello signor Vasari", Arezzo, Galleria Villicana D'Annibale, 2011
- Prize "XXIX Premio Firenze", Firenze, finalista, 2011
- Solo Exhibition "Una favola moderna", Pontassieve, Sala Eroine, Palazzo Comunale, 2012
- Solo Exhibition "Tra forma e sintesi", Vicchio del Mugello, Museo Casa di Giotto, 2012
- Exhibition "Arte in Rugapiana – Il ritorno dei fantastici 4", Cortona, Palazzo Ferretti, 2012
- Exhibition"Artisti in Cantina", Cerreto Guidi, Cantine di Portacaracosta, 2012
- Solo Exhibition "Espone Kevo", Campi Bisenzio, Cappella Villa Rucellai, 2012
- Solo Exhibition "All'ombra degli etruschi", Dicomano, Museo Etrusco, Palazzo Comunale, 2012
- Exhibition "Viaggio nel contemporaneo", Piancastagnaio, Hotel Miramonti, 2012
- Exhibition "Celebrazioni Vespucciane", Pontassieve, Sala delle Eroine, Palazzo Comunale, 2012
- Prize "XXX Premio Firenze", Firenze, Palazzo Vecchio, secondo premio "Fiorino d'argento", 2012
- Exhibition "Artistar Project", Milano, Galleria Artistar, 2012
- Exhibition "Volterra in cornice", Volterra, Palazzo dei Priori, 2013
- Exhibition "Arte da Firenze", Bratislava (Slovacchia), 2013
- Solo Exhibition "Naturalmente arte", Firenze, Museo di Storia Naturale La Specola, 2013
- Exhibition "Arte in Rugapiana – I fantastici 4", Cortona, Palazzo Ferretti, 2013
- Solo Exhibition "Legno e colore in Viterbo", Viterbo, Museo Colle del Duomo, 2013
- Exhibition "Operarte – Associazione in mostra", Firenze, Auditorium al Duomo, 2013
- "Premio della Fondazione Elisabetta e Mariachiara Casini Onlus", Firenze, Palazzo Vecchio, 2013
- Prize "XXXI Premio Firenze", Palazzo Vecchio, terzo premio "Medaglia di bronzo", 2013
- Solo Exhibition "I due volti dell'arte", Carpi, Palazzo dei Pio, 2014
- Prize "XXXII Premio Firenze", Palazzo Vecchio, terzo premio "Medaglia di bronzo", 2015
- Rassegna in occasione del Premio Letterario Internazionale "Tra le parole e l'infinito", Teatro Garibaldi, S. Maria Capua Vetere, 2015
- Solo Exhibition Galleria Comunale d'Arte Contemporanea, Palazzo Giorgi, Poppi, 2014
- Exhibition "V Esposizione Nazionale delle Arti Contemporanee", Soriano del Cimino, Castello Orsini, 2014
- Exhibition "Mostra degli artisti in permanenza", Soriano del Cimino, Factory Center, 2014
- Exhibition "Omaggio al ciclismo ricordando Gino Bartali", Firenze, Ciclomuseo Gino Bartali, 2014
- Exhibition "Arte da viaggio – 40 artisti con opere da mettere in valigia", Firenze, Simultanea Spazi d'Arte, 2014
- Exhibition "Itinere", collettiva itinerante, Bomarzo, Palazzo Orsini e Sant'Oreste, Palazzo Caccia Canali, 2014
