= Tay Keith =

American record producer (1996–2026)

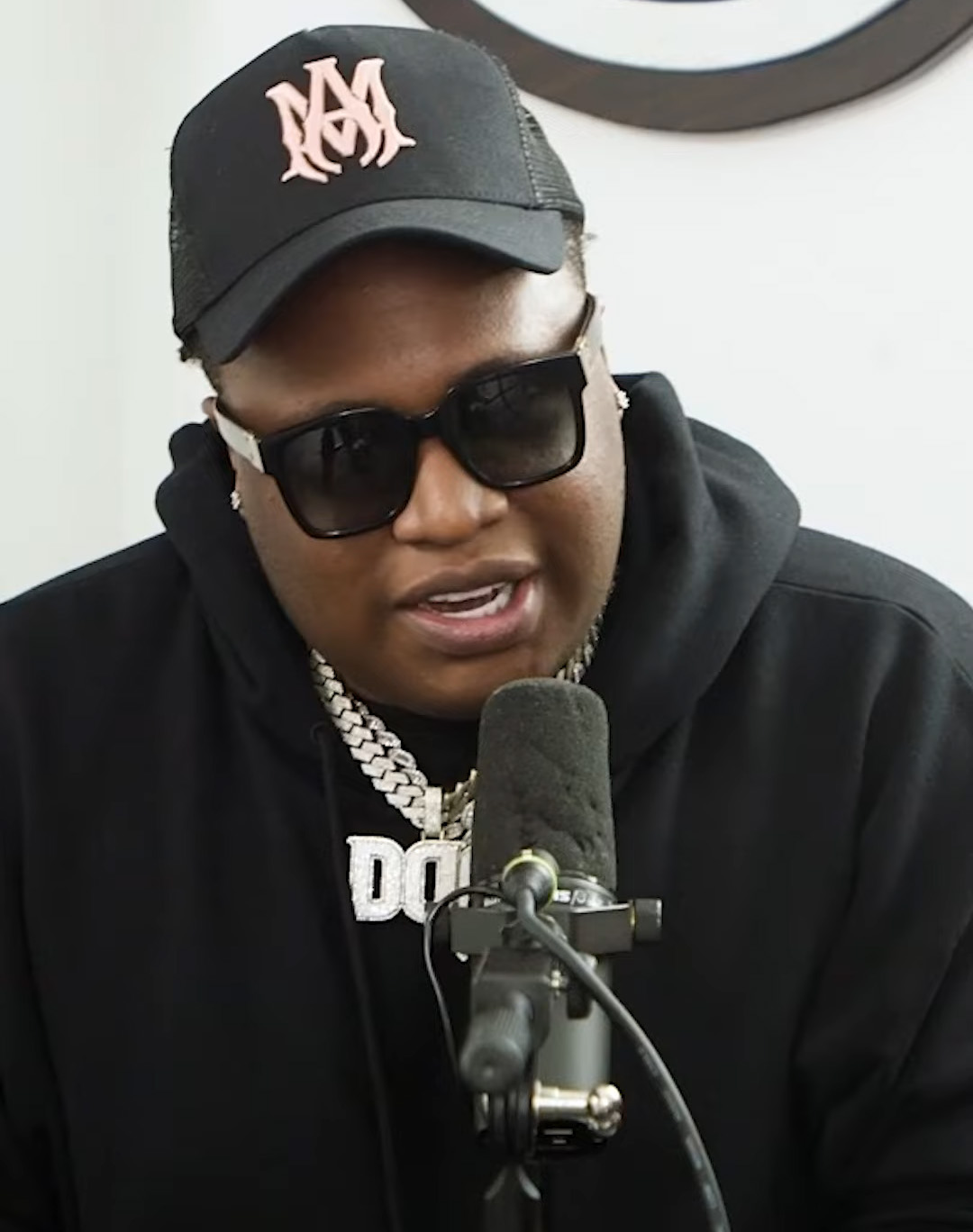
- Tay Keith in 2023

Background information
- Born: Brytavious Lakeith Chambers; September 20, 1996; Memphis, Tennessee, U.S.
- Died: June 18, 2026 (aged 29) Nashville, Tennessee, U.S.
- Cause of death: Accidental drug overdose
- Genres: Southern hip-hop; trap
- Occupations: Record producer; music programmer; songwriter
- Works: Discography
- Education: Middle Tennessee State University (BS)
- Years active: 2012–2026
- Labels: Drumatized; DOA; Warner Chappell; BMI
- Website: taykeithmerch.com

Brytavious Lakeith Chambers (September 20, 1996 – June 18, 2026), known professionally as Tay Keith, was an American record producer. He produced eleven Billboard Hot 100 top ten hits, including the 2018 singles "Look Alive" by BlocBoy JB and "Nonstop" by Drake, which peaked at five and two on the chart, respectively. He has produced four number-one hits in the chart: "Sicko Mode" (2018) and "4x4" (2025) by Travis Scott, and "Jimmy Cooks" (2022) and "First Person Shooter" (2023) by Drake. His 2023 single "Pound Town 2" (with Sexyy Red, featuring Nicki Minaj) marked his first entry on the chart as a lead artist.

On December 15, 2018, Tay Keith earned his bachelor's degree from Middle Tennessee State University (MTSU) in Murfreesboro, Tennessee. He was nominated for Best Rap Song for his work on "Sicko Mode" at the 61st Annual Grammy Awards. He was signed to a publishing deal with Warner Chappell Music and was a BMI member.

== Early life ==
Keith was born and raised in South Memphis, Memphis, Tennessee.

Around the age fourteen, he began to make music and publish it to YouTube and DatPiff. He also had a piano which he used to make songs and remake popular songs. One of the songs he remade was Lil Wayne's "Lollipop".

He met fellow American rapper BlocBoy JB when he was fourteen, after he moved to East Memphis. The two began making music together shortly afterward.

== Career ==
In 2015, Keith began working with rapper Blac Youngsta on his mixtape Fuck Everybody, for which he produced the single "Lil Bitch".

Keith gained mainstream success in 2018 through producing BlocBoy JB's "Rover" (later remixed to "Rover 2.0" featuring 21 Savage), "Shoot" and "Look Alive" featuring Drake, Drake's "Nonstop", Travis Scott's "Sicko Mode", Eminem's "Not Alike" featuring Royce da 5'9, and Lil Baby and Gunna's "Never Recover" featuring Drake. In 2019, Keith produced a bonus track, "Before I Let Go", on Beyoncé's Homecoming: The Live Album. In 2020, he produced "Rain", a single by Aitch featuring AJ Tracey. Keith was known for the distinctive producer tag "Tay Keith, fuck these niggas up!"; he also used the tag "Tay Keith is too hard". In 2024, he executive produced Sexyy Red's In Sexyy We Trust, after producing several of her singles such as "SkeeYee", "Pound Town 2", and "Get It Sexyy". Keith's final production credit appeared on Key Glock's album Project X, which was released just 24 hours after Keith's death.

== Personal life ==
Keith graduated from Middle Tennessee State University in 2018. Before his death in June 2026, he resided in Atlanta.

== Death ==
On June 18, 2026, Keith was found dead at his Nashville apartment following a welfare check conducted by local police. Authorities determined there was no evidence of foul play. He was 29 years old at the time of his death. A memorial for Keith was held on June 30, 2026, at the Cannon Center for the Performing Arts in Memphis, Tennessee. People in attendance included Sexyy Redd, Murda Beatz, Gunna, friends, family, and hundreds of fans. In September 2026, Nashville Medical Examiner’s Office said that Keith had ketamine and mitragynine in his body when he was found, and they ruled that he died of an accidental drug overdose.

== Discography ==
Collaborative albums

- Fxck the Cash Up (2020)

== Production discography ==
=== Charted singles ===
List of singles as either producer or co-producer, with selected chart positions and certifications, showing year released, performing artists and album title
Title	Year	Peak chart positions									Certifications	Album
Title	Year	US	US R&B/HH	AUS	CAN	IRE	NZ	SWE	SWI	UK	Certifications	Album
"Look Alive" (BlocBoy JB featuring Drake)	2018	5	3	24	4	16	15	30	34	17	RIAA: 5× Platinum; ARIA: Platinum; IFPI: Gold; BPI: Platinum; RMNZ: Gold	Simi
"Rover 2.0" (BlocBoy JB featuring 21 Savage)	2018	— (Note: "Rover 2.0" did not enter the Billboard Hot 100, but peaked at number two on the Bubbling Under Hot 100 Singles chart.)	49	—	—	—	—	—	—	—		Simi
"Who Want The Smoke?" (Lil Yachty featuring Cardi B and Offset)	2018	— (Note: "Who Want The Smoke?" did not enter the Billboard Hot 100, but peaked at number nine on the Bubbling Under Hot 100 Singles chart.)	— (Note: "Who Want The Smoke?" did not enter the Hot R&B/Hip-Hop Songs chart, but peaked at number five on the Bubbling Under Hot R&B/Hip-Hop Songs chart.)	—	—	—	—	—	—	—		Nuthin' 2 Prove
"Nonstop" (Drake)	2018	2	2	5	1	5	8	17	10	4	BPI: Platinum; MC: Platinum	Scorpion
"Sicko Mode" (Travis Scott featuring Drake)	2018	1	1	6	3	11	8	29	17	9	RIAA: Diamond (10× Platinum); ARIA: 8× Platinum; BPI: 2× Platinum; MC: 9× Platinum; RMNZ: 2× Platinum	Astroworld
"Stoopid" (6ix9ine featuring Bobby Shmurda)	2018	25	15	63	22	—	— (Note: "Stoopid" did not enter the NZ Top 40 Singles Chart, but peaked at number five on the NZ Hot Singles Chart.)	25	28	34	RIAA: Platinum	Dummy Boy
"Jumpin on a Jet" (Future)	2019	57	26	—	84	—	—	—	—	—	RIAA: Gold	The Wizrd
"100 Shooters" (Future featuring Meek Mill and Doe Boy)	2019	— (Note: "100 Shooters" did not enter the Billboard Hot 100, but peaked at number one on the Bubbling Under Hot 100 Singles chart.)	39	—	—	—	—	—	—	—	RIAA: Gold	High Off Life
"U Played" (Moneybagg Yo featuring Lil Baby)	2020	53	23	—	25	—	—	—	—	73	RIAA: Gold	Time Served
"Go Stupid" (Polo G, Stunna 4 Vegas and NLE Choppa featuring Mike Will Made It)	2020	60	29	—	28	97	— (Note: "Go Stupid" did not enter the NZ Top 40 Singles chart, but did peak at number 16 on the NZ Hot Singles chart.)	—	—	—	RIAA: Platinum; MC: Platinum	The Goat
"Holiday" (Lil Nas X)	2020	37	11	42	26	18	—	60	26	23	RIAA: Platinum; BPI: Silver; IFPI: Gold	Non-album single
"Every Chance I Get" (DJ Khaled featuring Lil Baby and Lil Durk)	2021	20	6	—	25	—	—	—	—	73	RIAA: Platinum	Khaled Khaled
"I Did It" (DJ Khaled featuring Post Malone, Megan Thee Stallion, Lil Baby and DaBaby)	2021	43	17	99	22	48	—	50	—	53		Khaled Khaled
"Type Shit" (Migos and Cardi B)	2021	71	30	—	—	—	—	—	—	—		Culture III
"Over the Top" (Smiley featuring Drake)	2021	57	19	—	13	73	—	—	—	97		Buy or Bye 2
"Ambition for Cash" (Key Glock)	2021	— (Note: "Ambition for Cash" did not enter the Billboard Hot 100, but peaked at number 11 on the Bubbling Under Hot 100 Singles chart.)	—	—	—	—	—	—	—	—		Yellow Tape 2
"Rumors" (Gucci Mane featuring Lil Durk)	2022	51	11	—	70	—	—	—	—	—		So Icy Gang: The ReUp
"Publicity Stunt" (Gucci Mane)	2022	72	22	—	—	—	—	—	—	—		So Icy Gang: The ReUp
"See Wat I'm Sayin" (Moneybagg Yo)	2022	59	14	—	—	—	—	—	—	—		Gangsta Art
"Hot Shit" (Cardi B, Kanye West and Lil Durk)	2022	13	7	39	28	60	—	—	—	59		Non-album single
"Never Sleep" (Nav and Lil Baby featuring Travis Scott)	2022	50	19	—	23	—	—	—	—	95		Demons Protected by Angels
"Jimmy Cooks" (Drake featuring 21 Savage)	2022	1	1	4	1	9	3	45	5	7		Honestly, Nevermind
"Rich Flex" (Drake and 21 Savage)	2022	2	1	3	1	3	2	16	4	3		Her Loss
"Circo Loco" (Drake and 21 Savage)	2022	8	7	9	5	7	35	55	—	7		Her Loss
"SkeeYee" (Sexyy Red)	2023	62	17	—	—	—	—	—	—	—		Hood Hottest Princess
"Meltdown" (Travis Scott featuring Drake)	2023	3	1	8	1	10	4	45	2	10		Utopia
"First Person Shooter" (Drake featuring J. Cole)	2023	1	1	4	2	7	5	42	10	4		For All the Dogs
"Shotta Flow 7" (NLE Choppa)	2023	— (Note: "Shotta Flow 7" did not enter the Billboard Hot 100, but peaked at number 24 on the Bubbling Under Hot 100 Singles chart.)	—	—	—	—	—	—	—	—		Shotta Flow Series
"Bow Bow Bow (F My Baby Dad)" (Sexyy Red)	2023	— (Note: "Bow Bow Bow (F My Baby Dad)" did not enter the Billboard Hot 100, but peaked at number 14 on the Bubbling Under Hot 100 Singles chart.)	38	—	—	—	—	—	—	—		Hood Hottest Princess
"Get It Sexyy" (Sexyy Red)	2024	20	6	—	82	—	—	—	—	—		In Sexyy We Trust
"Bussin" (Moneybagg Yo and Rob49)	2024	— (Note: "Bussin" did not enter the Billboard Hot 100, but peaked at number three on the Bubbling Under Hot 100 Singles chart.)	44	—	—	—	—	—	—	—		Speak Now
"Push Ups" (Drake)	2024	17	2	37	10	20	34	54	25	14		Non-album single
"Tryna Make Sure" (Moneybagg Yo)	2024	— (Note: "Tryna Make Sure" did not enter the Billboard Hot 100, but peaked at number 18 on the Bubbling Under Hot 100 Singles chart.)	38	—	—	—	—	—	—	—		Speak Now
"Family Matters" (Drake)	2024	7	5	26	6	21	16	59	32	17		Non-album single
"U My Everything" (Sexyy Red and Drake)	2024	44	12	—	70	—	—	—	—	—		In Sexyy We Trust
"4x4" (Travis Scott)	2025	1	1	53	24	47	30	97	10	23		Non-album singles
"Just Us" (Jack Harlow featuring Doja Cat)	2025	57	15	—	61	82	—	—	—	50		Non-album singles
"Art" (Nemzzz and Latto)	2025	—	—	—	—	—	—	—	—	97		Non-album singles
"What Did I Miss?" (Drake)	2025	2	1	37	2	47	29	75	60	27		Iceman
"Hang wit a Bad Bitch" (Sexyy Red and Key Glock)	2026	— (Note: "Hang wit a Bad Bitch" did not enter the Billboard Hot 100, but peaked at number six on the Bubbling Under Hot 100 Singles chart.)	23	—	—	—	—	—	—	—		Yo Favorite Trappa Favorite Rappa
"—" denotes a recording that did not chart or was not released in that territory.

=== Other charted songs ===
List of songs as either producer or co-producer, with selected chart positions and certifications, showing year released, performing artists and album title
Title	Year	Peak chart positions								Certifications	Album
Title	Year	US	US R&B/HH	AUS	CAN	IRE	NZ	SWE	UK	Certifications	Album
"Not Alike" (Eminem featuring Royce da 5'9)	2018	24	17	23	18	—	20	25	—	ARIA: Gold; BPI: Silver	Kamikaze
"Never Recover" (Lil Baby, Gunna and Drake)	2018	15	9	—	16	89	— (Note: "Never Recover" did not chart on the NZ Top 40 Singles chart, but did peak at number 13 on the NZ Hot Singles chart.)	—	46	RIAA: 2× Platinum; MC: Gold	Drip Harder
"Shine" (Quavo)	2018	— (Note: "Shine" did not enter the Billboard Hot 100, but peaked at number 23 on the Bubbling Under Hot 100 Singles chart.)	—	—	—	—	—	—	—		Quavo Huncho
"Don't Come Out the House" (Metro Boomin and 21 Savage)	2018	38	18	—	—	66	— (Note: "Don't Come Out the House" did not chart on the NZ Top 40 Singles chart, but did peak at number 7 on the NZ Hot Singles chart.)	—	80	RIAA: Platinum; MC: Gold	Not All Heroes Wear Capes
"Tic Tac Toe" (Meek Mill featuring Kodak Black)	2018	72	37	—	—	—	—	—	—		Championships
"Temptation" (Future)	2019	76	38	—	—	—	—	—	—		The Wizrd
"Promise U That" (Future)	2019	— (Note: "Promise U That" did not enter the Billboard Hot 100, but peaked at number one on the Bubbling Under Hot 100 Singles chart.)	49	—	—	—	—	—	—		The Wizrd
"Before I Let Go" (Beyoncé)	2019	65	24	—	—	71	—	73	77	RIAA: Platinum; RMNZ: Gold	Homecoming: The Live Album
"Wish Wish" (DJ Khaled featuring Cardi B & 21 Savage)	2019	19	8	88	28	—	— (Note: "Wish Wish" did not chart on the NZ Top 40 Singles chart, but did peak at number 14 on the NZ Hot Singles chart.)	—	81	RIAA: Platinum; MC: Gold	Father of Asahd
"Jealous" (DJ Khaled featuring Chris Brown, Lil Wayne, and Big Sean)	2019	57	26	59	54	—	— (Note: "Never Recover" did not chart on the NZ Top 40 Singles chart, but did peak at number eight on the NZ Hot Singles chart.)	—	37	RIAA: Gold	Father of Asahd
"Same Thing" (Lil Baby)	2020	78	40	—	—	—	—	—	—		My Turn
"Commercial" (Lil Baby featuring Lil Uzi Vert)	2020	23	12	—	59	—	— (Note: "Commercial" did not chart on the NZ Top 40 Singles chart, but did peak at number 15 on the NZ Hot Singles chart.)	—	—	RIAA: Gold	My Turn
"No Sucker" (Lil Baby and Moneybagg Yo)	2020	58	30	—	—	—	—	—	—	RIAA: Platinum	My Turn
"Feigning" (Gunna)	2020	98	50	—	—	—	—	—	—		Wunna
"Back Again" (King Von featuring Prince Dre and Lil Durk)	2020	— (Note: "Back Again" did not chart on the Billboard Hot 100, but did peak at number 11 on the Bubbling Under Hot 100 Singles chart.)	—	—	—	—	—	—	—		Welcome to O'Block
"Movie" (Megan Thee Stallion featuring Lil Durk)	2020	— (Note: "Movie" did not enter the Billboard Hot 100, but peaked at number two on the Bubbling Under Hot 100 chart.)	39	—	—	—	—	—	—		Good News
"Big Paper" (DJ Khaled featuring Cardi B)	2021	84	37	—	—	—	—	—	—		Khaled Khaled
"Genius" (Pop Smoke, Lil Tjay and Swae Lee)	2021	— (Note: "Genius" did not enter the Billboard Hot 100, but peaked at number five on the Bubbling Under Hot 100 chart.)	46	72	54	—	—	—	—		Faith
"We Slide" (Meek Mill featuring Young Thug)	2021	— (Note: "We Slide" did not enter the Billboard Hot 100, but peaked at number one on the Bubbling Under Hot 100 chart.)	46	—	—	—	—	—	—		Expensive Pain
"Something Bout Me" (Key Glock)	2021	— (Note: "Something Bout Me" did not enter the Billboard Hot 100, but peaked at number two on the Bubbling Under Hot 100 chart.)	—	—	—	—	—	—	—		Yellow Tape 2
"It Ain't Safe" (DJ Khaled featuring Nardo Wick and Kodak Black)	2022	77	26	—	89	—	—	—	—		God Did
"Let's Pray" (DJ Khaled featuring Don Toliver and Travis Scott)	2022	86	28	—	75	—	—	—	—		God Did
"From Now On" (Lil Baby featuring Future)	2022	42	20	—	77	—	—	—	—		It's Only Me
"Back and Forth" (Lil Baby and EST Gee)	2022	68	30	—	—	—	—	—	—		It's Only Me
"Broke Boys" (Drake and 21 Savage)	2022	12	10	87	12	—	—	—	—		Her Loss
"Call Your Name" (Chris Brown featuring Sexyy Red and GloRilla)	2026	— (Note: "Call Your Name" did not enter the Billboard Hot 100, but peaked at number two on the Bubbling Under Hot 100 chart.)	34	—	—	—	—	—	—		Brown
"—" denotes a recording that did not chart or was not released in that territory.

== Production credits ==
Year	Artist	Album	Songs
2013	Lil B	100% Gutta	"Still Flexin Membership"
2014	PnB Rock	Real N*gga Bangaz	"Stylish"
2014	Damso	Publie Partage Promo	"Publie Partage Promo"
2015	T-Wayne	Who Is Rickey Wayne?	"Stallion"
2016	Blac Youngsta	Young and Reckless	"Catch a Body", "All Of My N*ggas"
2016	BlocBoy JB	Who Am I	"Change On Your N*ggas", "No Chorus, Pt. 5", "No Chorus, Pt. 6"
2016	Blac Youngsta	Fuck Everybody	"Fuck Everybody Intro", "Lil Bitch", "On Me"
2016	BlocBoy JB	No Chorus, Pt. 7	"No Chorus, Pt. 7"
2016	Moneybagg Yo & Yo Gotti	2 Federal	"Afta While", "Gang Gang" ft. Blac Youngsta, "No Dealings"
2016	Project Pat	Street God 4	"Real Hood N*ggas", "Catch You Slippin"
2016	BlocBoy JB	Who Am I 2	"Ride To West Memphis", "Fr", "No Chorus, Pt. 9"
2017	Moneybagg Yo	Heartless	"More", "Hurtin"
2017	Blac Youngsta	Illuminati	"Set Trip"
2017	BlocBoy JB	Loco	"Intro", "F*ck A N*gga Bitch", "No Chorus, Pt. 9", "Outro"
2017	Blac Youngsta	I'm Innocent	"Birthday"
2017	BlocBoy JB	Who Am I 3	"Intro", "Shoot", "First Day Bacc on Da Bloc", "No Chorus, Pt. 10"
2017	Moneybagg Yo	Federal 3X	"Important", "Doin' It"
2017	BlocBoy JB	The Purple M&M	"Intro", "BBQ", "No Topic", "Pull Up", "Soulja", "Outro"
2017	Doe Boy	In Freebandz We Trust 2	"Shoot Em Up"
2017	Starlito	Funerals & Court Dates 2	"Important Freestyle"
2017	Starlito	Starlito's Way 4: GhettOut	"SB4Life", "SW4", "Airplane Mode"
2018	Juicy J	Shutdafukup	"Broke N*ggaz" ft. YKOM
2018	Key Glock	Glock Bond	"Russian Cream"
2018	Moneybagg Yo	2 Heartless	"Ion Get You", "Super Fake", "Back Then"
2018	Xavier Wulf	East Memphis Maniac	"Homecoming" ft. Bankroll Rico, "Eastside Sliding" ft. idontknowjeffery & Chris Travis, "Request Refused"
2018	Blac Youngsta	223	"Fuck Everybody Else"
2018	BlocBoy JB	Simi	"Turnt Up", "Look Alive" ft. Drake, "Nun of Dat" ft. Lil Pump, "Rover 2.0" ft. 21 Savage, "Wait", "Nike Swoosh" ft. YG, "No Chorus, Pt. 11", "Outro"
2018	Lil Baby	Harder Than Ever	"Exotic" ft. Starlito
2018	Rico Nasty	Nasty	"In The Air" ft. BlocBoy JB, "Transformer" ft. Gnar
2018	Drake	Scorpion	"Nonstop"
2018	Wiz Khalifa	Rolling Papers 2	"Real Rich" ft. Gucci Mane
2018	Moneybagg Yo	Bet On Me	"Dice Game", "Rush Hour", "Wat U On" ft. Gunna, "Exactly", "Correct Me"
2018	Travis Scott	Astroworld	"Sicko Mode" ft. Drake
2018	Blac Youngsta	Fuck Everybody 2	"Uh Uh", "Ight" ft. Lil Pump
2018	Eminem	Kamikaze	"Not Alike" ft. Royce da 5'9"
2018	Lil Baby and Gunna	Drip Harder	"Never Recover" ft. Drake
2018	Quavo	Quavo Huncho	"Shine"
2018	Lil Yachty	Nuthin' 2 Prove	"Who Want the Smoke?" ft. Cardi B and Offset
2018	BlocBoy JB	Don't Think That	"Club Roc", "Bacc Street Boys"
2018	Metro Boomin	Not All Heroes Wear Capes	"Don't Come Out The House" ft. 21 Savage
2018	Moneybagg Yo	Reset	"They Madd"
2018	Tee Grizzley	Still My Moment	"Hooters"
2018	Key Glock	Glockoma	"Since 6ix", "Life Is Great", "Dope", "Yea!!"
2018	6ix9ine	Dummy Boy	"Stoopid" ft. Bobby Shmurda
2018	Meek Mill	Championships	"Tic Tac Toe" ft. Kodak Black
2019	Future	The Wizrd	"Jumpin on a Jet", "Temptation", "Promise U That"
2019	Nav	Bad Habits	"Amazing" ft. Future
2019	Beyoncé	Homecoming: The Live Album	"Before I Let Go"
2019	DJ Khaled	Father of Asahd	"Wish Wish" ft. Cardi B and 21 Savage, "Jealous" ft. Chris Brown, Lil Wayne, and Big Sean
2019	Moneybagg Yo	43va Heartless	"No Filter"
2019	Denzel Curry	Zuu	"Automatic"
2019	Miley Cyrus	She is Coming	"Mother's Daughter"
2019	BlocBoy JB	I Am Me	"Head In My Lap"
2019	Gucci Mane	Delusions of Grandeur	"Bottom", "Look At Me Now"
2019	ILoveMakonnen	M3	"Money Fiend"
2019	Jaden	Erys	"Got It"
2019	Ugly God	Bumps & Bruises	"Batman"
2019	Gucci Mane	Woptober II	"Came from Scratch" ft. Quavo
2019	Hoodrich Pablo Juan	Dope Money Violence	"Pirate"
2019	Flipp Dinero	Love for Guala	"If I Tell You", "Not Too Many"
2019	Troyman	Rhythm + Flow Soundtrack: The Final Episode	"Streetlight"
2020	Moneybagg Yo	Time Served	"U Played" ft. Lil Baby
2020	Yo Gotti	Untrapped	"Bounce That"
2020	Marlo	1st & 3rd	"Stay Down" ft. Young Thug
2020	Lil Baby	My Turn	"Same Thing", "Commercial" ft. Lil Uzi Vert, "No Sucker" with Moneybagg Yo
2020	Ambjaay	It Cost to Live Like This, Pt. 2	"Blow The Pickle" ft. Wiz Khalifa
2020	Jackboy	Jackboy	"Like a Million" ft. Kodak Black
2020	Nav	Brown Boy 2	"I'm Up"
2020	Polo G	The Goat	"Go Stupid" with Stunna 4 Vegas and NLE Choppa
2020	Future	High Off Life	"100 Shooters" with Doe Boy ft. Meek Mill
2020	Gunna	Wunna	"Feigning"
2021	Pooh Shiesty	Shiesty Season	"Master P"
2021	G Herbo	—	"Really Like That"
2021	Hoodrich Pablo Juan	Designer Dope Boyz	"Easter Egg Hunt", "Go Get the Bag" with Banbwoi
2021	Key Glock	Yellow Tape 2	"Something Bout Me", "Ambition For Cash"
2021	Nardo Wick	Who is Nardo Wick?	"Lullaby"
2022	Pooh Shiesty	Shiesty Season: Certified	"It's Up"
2022	NAV	—	"Never Sleep" ft. Travis Scott and Lil Baby
2022	Cardi B	—	"Hot Shit" ft. Kanye West and Lil Durk
2022	DJ Khaled	God Did	"LET'S PRAY" ft. Don Toliver and Travis Scott
2022	thasup	c@ra++ere s?ec!@le	"c!ao" ft. Rondodasosa
2022	Troyman	What's Not To Love?	—
2023	Lucki	—	"Bby Pluto"
2023	Westside Gunn	And Then You Pray for Me	"Kostas" ft. Benny the Butcher and Conway the Machine, "Steve and Jony" ft. EST Gee
2024	Megan Thee Stallion	Megan	"Broke His Heart"
2025	Travis Scott	—	"4x4"
2025	Jack Harlow ft. Doja Cat	—	"Just Us"
"—" denotes the song is released as a single.
