= Yellow Tape (Key Glock album) =

Studio album by Key Glock
- Released: January 31, 2020
- Genre: Hip hop
- Length: 45:35
- Label: Paper Route Empire
- Producer: BandPlay; Kenny Beats; Kill; King Ceeo; LDG Beats; Little Island; RamyOnTheBeat; Sledgren; Southside; Will-A-Fool

Key Glock chronology
Dum and Dummer (2019)	Yellow Tape (2020)	Yellow Tape 2 (2021)

Professional ratings
Review scores
Source	Rating
AllMusic	4/5 stars
Exclaim!	6/10
HipHopDX	3.8/5
Pitchfork	7.4/10
RapReviews	7/10

Yellow Tape is the debut studio album by American rapper Key Glock from Memphis, Tennessee. It was released on January 31, 2020, through Paper Route Empire. Production was handled by Bandplay, LDG Beats and Sledgren among others. The album peaked at number 14 on the Billboard 200 in the United States.

A music video for "Look At They Face" was directed by Jordan Spencer and released on January 13, 2020. Videos for "Mr. Glock" and "I'm Just Sayin" were released on January 18, 2020, and January 29, 2020, respectively, also directed by Jordan Spencer.

== Track listing ==
All tracks are written by Markeyvius Cathey.

Yellow Tape track listing
No.	Title	Producer(s)	Length
1.	"1997"	BandPlay	2:23
2.	"Dough"	BandPlay	3:18
3.	"Word on the Streets"	BandPlay	3:26
4.	"Ooh"	BandPlay	2:48
5.	"What Goes Around Comes Around"	BandPlay; Will-A-Fool	3:12
6.	"Crash"	Southside	2:31
7.	"Look At They Face"	BandPlay	2:45
8.	"I'm Just Sayin"	Kill; LDG Beats	2:39
9.	"Biig Boyy!"	Little Island	2:58
10.	"Flyest Highest Coolest Smoothest"	RamyOnTheBeat	2:47
11.	"Loaded"	Kenny Beats	2:33
12.	"Fuck All Dat"	BandPlay	2:35
13.	"Mr. Glock"	Sledgren	2:26
14.	"Amen"	Kill	3:11
15.	"Stop Playin"	BandPlay	2:55
16.	"1 of 1"	King Ceeo	2:58
Total length:			45:35

== Charts ==
Chart performance for Yellow Tape
Chart (2020)	Peak position
US Billboard 200	14

== Certifications ==
Region	Certification	Certified units/sales
United States (RIAA)	Gold	500,000^{‡}
^{‡} Sales+streaming figures based on certification alone.
