= Young Dolph discography =

- Young Dolph outside a studio session with Nashville's Bug Diddy.
- Studio albums: 6
- EPs: 3
- Compilation albums: 1
- Singles: 32
- Music videos: 60
- Mixtapes: 21

American rapper Young Dolph (1985–2021) released six studio albums, twenty-one mixtapes, sixty music videos, three extended plays, one compilation album and 32 singles, which were certified by the Recording Industry Association of America (RIAA), (excluding 8 on which he was a featured artist). Following his death in June 2021, two albums, with unreleased tracks, have been posthumously released. Dolph began his music career in 2008 after encouragement from friends and released his debut mixtape, Paper Route Campaign.

In 2010, Dolph established his record label, Paper Route Empire, as an independent record label. The same year, he released another mixtape, Welcome 2 Dolph World, which did not chart on the Billboard 200. In 2011, he released his third and fourth mixtapes, High Class Street Music and High Class Street Music 2: Hustler's Paradise. Both mixtapes featured production from Memphis producers such as Drumma Boy and DJ Squeeky.

In February 2016, Dolph released his debut studio album, King of Memphis, on his independent label, Paper Route Empire. The album peaked at number 49 on the Billboard 200. The album title drew criticism from other Memphis rappers, including Yo Gotti and Blac Youngsta, who released a diss track in response. In 2017, Dolph released a diss track aimed at Yo Gotti titled "Play Wit Yo' Bitch". Two weeks later, he released a music video for the song. His next two studio albums were Bulletproof (2017) and Thinking Out Loud (2017). The albums peaked at numbers 36 and 16, respectively, on the US charts. The single "100 Shots", from Bulletproof, also reached the top ten. After turning down a $22 million recording deal in 2018, Dolph signed a partnership deal with Empire Distribution and released the joint mixtape Dum and Dummer with Key Glock on July 26, 2019.

In 2018, Dolph released his fourth studio album, Role Model, which debuted at number 15 on the Billboard 200. Its single "Major", featuring Key Glock, became an international hit and peaked at number one on the Bubbling Under Hot 100. The following year, Dolph released a collaborative album, Dum and Dummer with Key Glock. In 2020, he released his fifth studio album, Rich Slave. Music critic Tom Breihan of Stereogum praised the album, describing Young Dolph as a "cult hero". The album peaked at number four on the Billboard 200. Its single "RNB", featuring Megan Thee Stallion, reached number one on the Bubbling Under Hot 100. The album was certified Gold by the RIAA and sold over 500,000 copies worldwide. His seventh and final studio album, Paper Route Frank, was released posthumously in 2022.

== Albums ==
=== Studio albums ===
List of studio albums, with selected details
| Title | Album details | Peak chart positions | | | | | Certifications |
| Title | Album details | US | US R&B/HH | US Rap | US Ind. | CAN | Certifications |
|---|---|---|---|---|---|---|---|
| King of Memphis | Released: February 19, 2016; Label: Paper Route Empire; Format: CD, LP, digital download, streaming | 49 | 9 | 5 | 5 | — | |
| Bulletproof | Released: April 1, 2017; Label: Paper Route Empire; Format: CD, digital download, streaming | 36 | 19 | 14 | 7 | — | |
| Thinking Out Loud | Released: October 20, 2017; Label: Paper Route Empire; Format: CD, LP, digital download, streaming | 16 | 9 | 8 | 2 | — | |
| Role Model | Released: September 21, 2018; Label: Paper Route Empire; Format: CD, digital download, streaming | 15 | 11 | 9 | 6 | — | |
| Rich Slave | Released: August 14, 2020; Label: Paper Route Empire; Format: CD, LP, digital download, streaming | 4 | 3 | 3 | 1 | 84 | RIAA: Gold |
| Paper Route Frank | Released: December 16, 2022; Label: Paper Route Empire; Format: CD, LP, digital download, streaming | 25 | 9 | 4 | 3 | — | |
"—" denotes a recording that did not chart or was not released in that territory.

=== Compilation albums ===
List of compilation albums, with selected details
| Title | Album details | Peak chart positions | | | |
| Title | Album details | US | US R&B/HH | US Rap | US Ind. |
|---|---|---|---|---|---|
| Paper Route Illuminati (with Paper Route Empire) | Released: July 30, 2021; Label: Paper Route Empire; Format: Digital download, streaming | 22 | 13 | 10 | 1 |

== Mixtapes ==
List of mixtapes, with selected details
| Title | Album details | Peak chart positions | | | | | Certifications |
| Title | Album details | US | US R&B/HH | US Rap | US Ind. | CAN | Certifications |
|---|---|---|---|---|---|---|---|
| Paper Route Campaign | Released: April 20, 2008; Label: Paper Route Empire; Format: CD, digital download, streaming | — | — | — | — | — | |
| Welcome 2 Dolph World | Released: July 2, 2010; Label: Paper Route Empire; Format: CD, digital download, streaming | — | — | — | — | — | |
| High Class Street Music | Released: May 7, 2011; Label: Paper Route Empire; Format: CD, digital download, streaming | — | — | — | — | — | |
| High Class Street Music 2: Hustler's Paradise | Released: November 8, 2011; Label: Paper Route Empire; Format: CD, digital download, streaming | — | — | — | — | — | |
| A Time 2 Kill | Released: April 6, 2012; Label: Paper Route Empire; Format: CD, digital download, streaming | — | — | — | — | — | |
| Blue Magic | Released: November 14, 2012; Label: Paper Route Empire; Format: CD, digital download, streaming | — | — | — | — | — | |
| East Atlanta Memphis (with Gucci Mane) | Released: March 16, 2013; Label: 1017 Brick Squad; Format: CD, digital download, streaming | — | — | — | — | — | |
| High Class Street Music 3: Trappin' Out a Mansion | Released: May 13, 2013; Label: Paper Route Empire; Format: CD, digital download, streaming | — | — | — | — | — | |
| South Memphis Kingpin | Released: October 15, 2013; Label: Paper Route Empire; Format: CD, digital download, streaming | — | — | — | — | — | |
| Cross Country Trappin | Released: April 15, 2014; Label: Paper Route Empire; Format: CD, digital download, streaming | — | — | — | — | — | |
| High Class Street Music 4: American Gangster | Released: July 8, 2014; Label: Paper Route Empire; Format: CD, digital download, streaming | — | — | — | — | — | |
| High Class Street Music 5: The Plug Best Friend | Released: February 24, 2015; Label: Paper Route Empire; Format: CD, digital download, streaming | — | — | — | — | — | |
| Felix Brothers (with Gucci Mane and Peewee Longway) | Released: June 30, 2015; Label: 1017 Records, RBC Records; Format: CD, digital download, streaming | — | — | — | — | — | |
| BagMen (with Peewee Longway) | Released: July 15, 2015; Label: Familiar Territory; Format: CD, digital download, streaming | — | — | — | — | — | |
| 16 Zips | Released: July 28, 2015; Label: Paper Route Empire; Format: CD, digital download, streaming | — | — | — | — | — | |
| Shittin' On The Industry | Released: October 8, 2015; Label: Paper Route Empire; Format: CD, digital download, streaming | — | — | — | — | — | |
| Bosses & Shooters | Released: May 27, 2016; Label: Paper Route Empire; Format: CD, digital download, streaming | — | — | — | — | — | |
| Rich Crack Baby | Released: August 26, 2016; Label: Paper Route Empire; Format: CD, digital download, streaming | 132 | 14 | 13 | 15 | — | |
| Gelato | Released: February 3, 2017; Label: Paper Route Empire; Format: CD, digital download, streaming | 54 | 22 | 13 | — | — | |
| Dum and Dummer (with Key Glock) | Released: July 26, 2019; Label: Paper Route Empire; Format: CD, download, streaming | 8 | 5 | 4 | 16 | 83 | RIAA: Gold |
| Dum and Dummer 2 (with Key Glock) | Released: March 26, 2021; Label: Paper Route Empire; Format: CD, LP, download, streaming | 8 | 5 | 4 | 2 | — | |
"—" denotes a recording that did not chart or was not released in that territory.

== Extended plays ==
List of extended plays, with selected details
| Title | EP details | Peak chart positions | | |
| Title | EP details | US | US R&B/HH | US Rap |
|---|---|---|---|---|
| Bossed Up | Released: May 15, 2016; Label: Sinatra Music Group; Format: Digital download, streaming | — | — | — |
| Tracking Numbers (with Berner) | Released: August 24, 2017; Label: Bern One Entertainment; Format: Digital download, streaming | — | — | — |
| Niggas Get Shot Everyday | Released: February 16, 2018; Label: Paper Route Empire; Format: Digital download, streaming | 59 | 29 | 24 |

== Singles ==
=== As lead artist ===
List of singles as lead artist, with selected chart positions, showing year released and album name
| Title | Year | Peak chart positions | | | Certifications | Album |
| Title | Year | US Bub. | US R&B/HH | US Main. R&B/HH | Certifications | Album |
|---|---|---|---|---|---|---|
| "Get Paid" | 2016 | — | — | — | | King of Memphis |
| "Play Wit Yo Bitch" | 2017 | — | — | — | RIAA: Platinum | Gelato |
| "100 Shots" | 2017 | 10 | 49 | — | RIAA: Platinum | Bulletproof |
| "Bagg" (featuring Lil Yachty) | 2017 | — | — | — | | Gelato |
| "While U Here" | 2017 | — | — | — | | Thinking Out Loud |
| "Believe Me" | 2017 | — | — | — | | Thinking Out Loud |
| "Drippy" | 2017 | — | — | — | | Thinking Out Loud |
| "Major" (featuring Key Glock) | 2018 | 1 | 47 | 18 | RIAA: 4× Platinum | Role Model |
| "Sunshine" | 2020 | — | — | — | | Non-album single |
| "RNB" (featuring Megan Thee Stallion) | 2020 | 1 | 46 | 5 | RIAA: Gold | Rich Slave |
| "Blue Diamond" | 2020 | — | — | — | | Rich Slave |
| "Death Row" | 2020 | — | — | — | | Rich Slave |
| "Aspen" (with Key Glock) | 2021 | — | — | 29 | | Dum and Dummer 2 |
| "Hall of Fame" | 2022 | 17 | — | 37 | | Paper Route Frank |
| "Get Away" | 2022 | 4 | 40 | — | | Paper Route Frank |
"—" denotes a recording that did not chart or was not released in that territory.

=== As featured artist ===
List of singles as featured artist, with selected chart positions, showing year released and album name
| Title | Year | Peak chart positions | | | | Certifications | Album |
| Title | Year | US | US R&B/HH | US Rap | US Main. R&B/HH | Certifications | Album |
|---|---|---|---|---|---|---|---|
| "California" (Colonel Loud featuring T.I., Ricco Barrino and Young Dolph) | 2015 | — (Note: "California" did not enter the Billboard Hot 100, but peaked at number two on the Bubbling Under Hot 100 chart.) | 32 | 21 | 8 | | California EP |
| "Cut It" (O.T. Genasis featuring Young Dolph) | 2015 | 35 | 11 | 6 | 3 | RIAA: 2× Platinum | Rhythm & Bricks |
| "Bling Blaww Burr" (Gucci Mane featuring Young Dolph) | 2016 | — | — (Note: "Bling Blaww Burr" did not enter the Hot R&B/Hip-Hop Songs chart, but peaked at number ten on the Bubbling Under R&B/Hip-Hop Singles chart.) | — | — | | Woptober |
| "Both Eyes Closed" (Gucci Mane featuring 2 Chainz & Young Dolph) | 2017 | — | — | — | — | RIAA: Gold | Droptopwop |
| "Downfall" (Lil Durk featuring Young Dolph) | 2018 | — | — | — | — | RIAA: Gold | Signed to the Streets 3 |
| "Drip Like Dis" (Bankroll Freddie featuring Lil Baby and Young Dolph) | 2019 | — | — | — | 23 | RIAA: Gold | From Trap to Rap |
| "Blood All on It" (Gucci Mane featuring Key Glock and Young Dolph) | 2022 | 98 | 32 | — | — | | So Icy Gang: The ReUp |
| "Let's Go (Remix)" (Key Glock featuring Young Dolph) | 2024 | 59 | 23 | 20 | — | | Madden NFL 25 soundtrack |
"—" denotes a recording that did not chart or was not released in that territory.

== Other charted songs ==
| Title | Year | Peak chart positions | | | Certifications | Album |
| Title | Year | US | US R&B/HH | US Main. R&B/HH | Certifications | Album |
|---|---|---|---|---|---|---|
| "Preach" | 2014 | — | — | 24 | | Cross Country Trappin and High Class Street Music 4 |
| "Pulled Up" (featuring 2 Chainz and Juicy J) | 2015 | — | — | 39 | | High Class Street Music 5 |
| "Facts" | 2016 | — | — | — | RIAA: Gold | King of Memphis |
| "Get Paid" | 2016 | — | — | 35 | | King of Memphis |
| "Royalty" | 2016 | — | — | 33 | | King of Memphis |
| "Foreva" (featuring T.I.) | 2016 | — | — | — | RIAA: Platinum | Rich Crack Baby |
| "Stunting Ain't Nuthin" (Gucci Mane featuring Slim Jxmmi and Young Dolph) | 2017 | 95 | 39 | — | | Mr. Davis |
| "Go Get Sum Mo" (featuring Gucci Mane, 2 Chainz and Ty Dolla Sign) | 2017 | — | — (Note: "Go Get Sum Mo" did not enter the Hot R&B/Hip-Hop Songs chart, but peaked at number nine on the Bubbling Under R&B/Hip-Hop Singles chart.) | 29 | | Thinking Out Loud |
| "By Mistake" | 2018 | — | — | 36 | RIAA: Gold | Role Model |
| "1 Hell of a Life" (with Key Glock) | 2019 | — | — | — | RIAA: Gold | Dum and Dummer |
| "Water on Water on Water" (with Key Glock) | 2019 | — | — | 35 | RIAA: Platinum | Dum and Dummer |
| "Hold Up Hold Up Hold Up" | 2020 | — (Note: "Hold Up Hold Up Hold Up" did not enter the Billboard Hot 100, but peaked at number 16 on the Bubbling Under Hot 100 chart.) | — | — | RIAA: Gold | Rich Slave |
| "To Be Honest" | 2020 | — | — | — | RIAA: Gold | Rich Slave |
| "No Sense" (featuring Key Glock) | 2020 | — | — | — | RIAA: Gold | Rich Slave |
| "1 Scale" (featuring G Herbo) | 2020 | — (Note: "1 Scale" did not enter the Billboard Hot 100, but peaked at number 18 on the Bubbling Under Hot 100 chart.) | 45 | — | RIAA: Gold | Rich Slave |
| "Penguins" (with Key Glock) | 2021 | — (Note: "Penguins" did not enter the Billboard Hot 100, but peaked at number 15 on the Bubbling Under Hot 100 chart.) | — | — | | Dum and Dummer 2 |
| "Love for the Streets" | 2022 | — (Note: "Love for the Streets" did not enter the Billboard Hot 100, but peaked at number 13 on the Bubbling Under Hot 100 chart.) | — | — | | Paper Route Frank |
