= Yung L.A. discography =

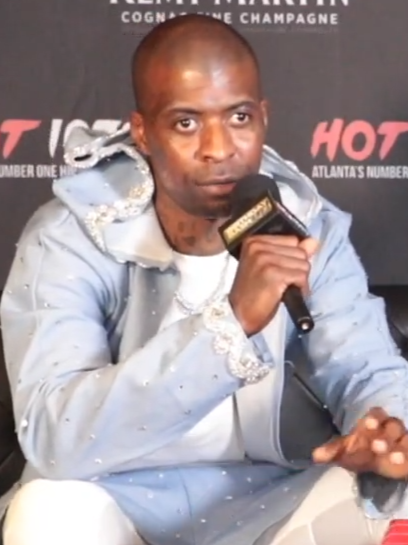
- Yung L.A. in 2023
- Studio albums: 1
- Singles: 3
- Music videos: 4
- Mixtapes: 8

The discography of Yung L.A., an American hip hop recording artist, consists of eight mixtapes, three singles (including one as a featured artist) and four music videos.

== Albums ==
=== Studio albums ===
Title	Album details
Check	Released: November 27, 2012; Label: U-Digg Music group; Format: CD, MD

=== Compilation albums ===
Year	Title
2014	Blue Bank Roll Vol. 1: Released: April 15, 2014; Label: River Park Media; Formats: music download, LP
2014	Blue Bank Roll Vol. 2: Released: April 15, 2014; Label: River Park Media; Formats: music download, LP

=== Mixtapes ===
Yung L.A.'s mixtapes and details
Title	Mixtape details
Offset Shawty	Released: April 12, 2008; Hosted by DJ Spinz; Retail mixtape
The Matrix	Released: December 28, 2008; Hosted by DJ Coolbreeze
Black Boy, White Boy (with Young Dro)	Released: March 31, 2009; Hosted by DJ Infamous
Lamborghini Leland	Released: June 1, 2009; Hosted by DJ Drama
I Think I Can Sing	Released: November 5, 2009; Hosted by DJ Holiday
Batman & Robin (Superhero Language) (with J Money aka J. Futuristic)	Released: December 14, 2009; Hosted by DJ Spinz
Crush Da Block	Released: February 23, 2010; Hosted by DJ Infamous & DJ Don Cannon
Suntrust Leland	Released: August 24, 2010; Hosted by DJ Smallz
Crush Da Block 2	Released: September 9, 2011; Hosted by DJ DJ P Exclusivez
Batman & Robin 2 (Superhero Language) (with J Money)	Released: November 19, 2014; Hosted by DJ E.Sudd, DJ Jay Rock & DJ Plugg
Expensive Language (as Da Boi Lay)	Released: March 27, 2015; Hosted by DJ P Exclusivez
3 Way: 80Lay Mafia (as Da Boi Lay) (with 808 Mafia)	Released: August 7, 2015; Hosted by DJ P Exclusivez
3 Way: Dripset (as Da Boi Lay) (with Zaytoven & Cassius Jay)	Released: August 7, 2015; Hosted by DJ P Exclusivez
3 Way: Foreign Water (as Da Boi Lay)	Released: August 7, 2015; Hosted by DJ P Exclusivez

=== Miscellaneous ===
List of miscellaneous albums, with selected information
Title	Album details	Notes
Futuristic Leland	Released: August 25, 2009 (US) (shelved); Label: Grand Hustle, Interscope; Format: Bootleg, digital download	Originally meant to be released as Yung L.A.'s debut studio album; however, it was shelved before its official release date due to Yung L.A. being dropped from Interscope Records and parting ways with Grand Hustle Records.

== Singles ==
=== As lead artist ===
List of singles, with selected chart positions, showing year released and album name
Title	Year	Peak chart positions			Album
Title	Year	US	US R&B	US Rap	Album
"Ain't I" (featuring Young Dro & T.I.)	2008	47	7	4	Futuristic Leland (shelved)
"Futuristic Love (Elroy)" (featuring Ricco Barrino)	2009	—	55	—	Futuristic Leland (shelved)
"36 O's" (featuring Lil Boosie)	2009	—	—	—	Futuristic Leland (shelved)
"—" denotes a title that did not chart, or was not released in that territory.	2009				

=== As featured artist ===
Year	Song	U.S. Hot 100	U.S. R&B	U.S. Rap	Album
2009	"Walk It to the Bank" (LoFat featuring Rocko and Yung L.A.)	—	—	—	Non-album single
2009	"Take Off" (Young Dro featuring Yung L.A.)	—	71	—	P.O.L.O. (Players Only Live Once)
2017	"Pose To" (Zaytoven featuring Bankroll Fresh, Twista and Yung L.A.)	—	—	—	Non-album single

== Guest appearances ==
- 2008
  - Big Kuntry King - "Posse" (feat. Mac Boney & Yung L.A.)
  - Big Kuntry King - "Goin' Ham" (feat. Yung L.A.)
  - J-Money - "Dis Is How We Play" (feat. Shop Boyz & Yung L.A.)
  - Lil Blue - "Do It" (feat. Gucci Mane & Yung L.A.)
  - Rob Fetti - "Like Da Pole" (feat. Yung L.A. & Blazed)
  - Frail Village- "Walk It to the Bank" (feat. LoFat, Rocko & Yung L.A.)
- 2009
  - Gucci Mane - "I Put That on Everything" (feat. Yung L.A.)
  - Playboi Trent - "Money Shuffle" (feat. Yung L.A.)
  - Yo Gotti - "I'll Ride, I'll Die" (feat. Yung L.A., J Futuristic, Zedzilla & All Star)
  - Young Dro - "Blessings" (with Yung L.A.)
  - Young Dro - "Damn I Look Good" (feat. Yung L.A.)
  - Young Dro - "I Don't Know Y'all" (with Yung L.A.)
  - Young Dro - "Party" (feat. Yung L.A.)
  - Young Dro - "Take Off" (feat. Yung L.A.)
  - Young Dro - "Shine" (feat. Yung L.A.)
  - Young Dro - "Woah" (feat. Yung L.A.)
- 2010
  - A1 - "Cartier Frames" (feat. Yung L.A.)
  - Big Kuntry King - "Lean" (feat. Yung L.A. & Yo Gotti)
  - Boss G - Yola City (feat. Yung LA & OJ da Juiceman)
  - Cam'ron and Vado - "We In This Thing" (feat. Yung L.A.)
  - Cyse Money - Kinki Swagg (feat. Yung L.A.)
  - Jose Guapo - 4 Days (feat. Young Dro & Yung L.A.)
  - Milion - "Outfit" (feat. Yung L.A.)
  - Rich Kid Shawty - "Splurge (Remix)" (feat. Yung L.A. & Young Dro)
  - Young Dro - "Freeze Me (Remix)" (feat. Yung L.A., Rick Ross, T.I. & Gucci Mane)
- 2011
  - Yung Fresh - "Flex" (feat. Tracy T & Yung L.A.)
- 2023
  - La Fève - "Type Shit" (feat. Yung L.A.)

== Music videos ==
Year	Title	Director(s)
2008	"Ain't I"	Kai Crawford
2009	"Futuristic Love (Elroy)"	Va$htie

=== Featured music videos ===
Year	Title	Artist(s)	Director(s)
2009	"Take Off"	Young Dro f/ Yung L.A.	Gabriel Hart
2009	"I Don’t Know Y’all"	Young Dro f/ Yung L.A.	Gabriel Hart

=== Cameo appearances ===
Year	Title	Artist(s)	Director(s)
2009	"Ice Cream Paint Job"	Dorrough	Dr. Teeth
2009	"Teach Me How to Jerk"	Audio Push	Erik White
2009	"O Let's Do It"	Waka Flocka Flame	
