= Nard & B =

American record production duo

- Origin: Atlanta, Georgia, United States
- Genres: Hip hop; R&B
- Occupations: Record producers; songwriters
- Years active: 2006–present
- Labels: Grand Hustle; TrenchWerk
- Members: James Bernard Rosser Jr. Brandon Rackley

Nard & B are an American record production team, composed of record producers James "Nard" Bernard Rosser Jr. and Brandon "B" Rackley, from Atlanta, Georgia. In 2007, the duo signed a deal with American recording artist T.I.'s Grand Hustle Records. In 2007, Nard & B founded TrenchWerk Entertainment, a music production company, with the intention of "uniting the best music producers in Atlanta and creating the most undeniable and unmatched production available."

== History ==
Brandon Rackley, professionally known as B, met James Bernard Rosser Jr., professionally known as Nard, while they were both attending at Omnithech, majoring in Music and Engineering. Upon completing college, Nard landed a job as a tracking engineer for Atlanta-based rapper T.I.'s label, Grand Hustle Records. In 2007, Nard & B received their first placement on a major label studio album. The song, titled "That's Right", features vocals from T.I. and was included on Grand Hustle artist Big Kuntry King's debut effort, My Turn to Eat. The success of the record earned them the attention of Grand Hustle president Jason Geter, who signed them as in-house producers. Also in 2007, Nard & B officially remixed T.I.'s hit single "Big Shit Poppin' (Do It)", providing new production while Grand Hustle rappers Mac Boney, Alfamega, JR Get Money and Big Kuntry King, all added new verses. In 2009, Nard & B co-produced Brooklyn-based rapper Maino's hit single "All the Above", alongside high-profile record producer Just Blaze. Nard & B also went on to contribute production on Puff Daddy's 2015 project MMM (Money Making Mitch). In August 2015, Nard & B released a collaborative mixtape, titled Trench Muzik, alongside then-Grand Hustle artist Spodee. On September 13, 2015, Spodee teamed up with Nard & B to release Trench Muzik 2. On November 22, 2015, the third installment of Trench Muzik was released.

On February 9, 2016, Atlanta rapper Skooly, formerly of Rich Kidz, teamed up with Nard & B to release Trench Gotti. On April 21, 2016, Nard & B teamed up with Jose Guapo to release Extravagant Trench Shit. On July 19, 2016, B released a song titled "Out Perform You", under the pseudonym ¡B!. The song, produced by Nard & B and XL Eagle, is the first to drop from B's debut project, "that will feature exclusive records from a variety of artists". The project, which is tentatively scheduled to drop at the end of the year, will include production from Nard & B with co-production from TrenchWerk producer, XL Eagle. On October 11, 2016, Nard & B released a collaborative mixtape with Jamaican rapper and Hustle Gang affiliate Zuse. The mixtape, titled Trench Zuse, enlist some of Nard & B fellow producers such as DJ Spinz, Bobby Kritical, Will A Fool, and DJ Plugg. Southern hip hop producer XL Eagle, a member of the TrenchWerk team, produces on almost every track. In 2017, Migos released "T-Shirt", produced by Nard & B, from their second album Culture. "T-Shirt" managed to reach the Top 40 of the US Billboard Hot 100 chart.

== Singles produced ==
List of singles as either producer or co-producer, with selected chart positions and certifications, showing year released, performing artists and album name
Title	Year	Peak chart positions										Certifications	Album
Title	Year	US	US R&B	US Rap	AUS	CAN	GER	IRL	NZ	SWI	UK	Certifications	Album
"That's Right" (Big Kuntry King featuring T.I.)	2007	—	105	—	—	—	—	—	—	—	—		My Turn to Eat
"All the Above" (Maino featuring T-Pain)	2009	39	59	10	—	—	—	—	—	—	—	RIAA: Platinum	If Tomorrow Comes...
"Hood Dreamer" (Willy Northpole featuring B.o.B)	2009	—	—	—	—	—	—	—	—	—	—		Tha Connect
"Futuristic Love (Elroy)" (Yung L.A. featuring Ricco Barrino)	2009	—	55	—	—	—	—	—	—	—	—		non-album single
"Imma Fool Wit It" (Killer Mike and Big Kuntry King)	2009	—	—	—	—	—	—	—	—	—	—		Underground Atlanta
"So High" (Slim Thug featuring B.o.B)	2010	125	35	19	—	—	—	—	—	—	—		Tha Thug Show
"Seven Million" (Lil Uzi Vert featuring Future)	2016	—	54	—	—	—	—	—	—	—	—		The Perfect Luv Tape
"T-Shirt" (Migos)	2017	19	11	7	—	16	—	—	5	53	82	RIAA: 2× Platinum	Culture
"Glo Up Remix" (Jordan Kristine Seamon featuring High Defynition)	2018	—	—	—	—	—	—	—	—	—	—		non-album single
"—" denotes a recording that did not chart or was not released in that territory.

== Albums produced ==
=== 2008 ===
Big Kuntry King - My Turn to Eat

- 01. "Intro" (feat. Lil Duval)
- 06. "Soul of a Man" (feat. Ricco Barrino) (produced with Keith Mack)
- 12. "That's Right" (feat. T.I.)

T.I. - Paper Trail

- 04. "On Top of the World" (feat. B.o.B & Ludacris)

DJ MLK & DJ Scream - Respect the Hustle, Vol. 2

- 08. "4 or 5 Wayz" (performed by Alfamega)
- 23. "Major League" (performed by Mac Boney)

=== 2009 ===
Willy Northpole - Tha Connect

- 06. "Hood Dreamer" (feat. B.o.B)

Birdman - Pricele$$

- 19. "Sky High" (feat. Mishon)

Jae Millz - Untitled

- 00. "Hallelujah" (feat. Mack Maine)

Mack Maine - Untitled

- 00. "Where Dey Do Dat At" (feat. Big Kuntry King, Birdman & B)

Maino - If Tomorrow Comes...

- 07. "All the Above" (feat. T-Pain) (produced with Just Blaze)

=== 2010 ===
T.I. - No Mercy

- 19. "That's What I Thought" (feat. Mac Boney & Killer Mike)

Slim Thug - Tha Thug Show

- 9. "So High" (feat. B.o.B.)

Mack Maine - Untitled

- 00. "All In One Swipe" (feat. Rick Ross, Birdman & Young Chu)

=== 2011 ===
Future - Dirty Sprite

- 14. "Splashin'"

=== 2012 ===
D.O.P.E. - D.O.P.E.

- 03. "Zombie"
- 05. "Spazz" (feat. Travis Porter)
- 07. "Deserve It All" (feat. 5th Year)
- 08. "Like This"
- 10. "Know Dat" (feat. 5th Year)

Future - Pluto

- 03. "Straight Up"

DJ Khaled - "Kiss the Ring"

- 10. I'm Paid (feat. Maino, Jae Millz, Yung L.A. & YC)

Future - Pluto 3D

- 02. "You Deserve It"

=== 2013 ===
Hustle Gang - G.D.O.D. (Get Dough or Die)

- 16. "Away"

Kevin Gates - The Luca Brasi Story

- 17. "Hero"

Young Scooter - Street Lottery

- 05. "Street Lottery" (feat. Bun B)

Young Thug - 1017 Thug

- 01. "Yeah Yeah" (feat. Heavy & OG Boo Dirty)
- 07. "Murder"
- 10. "Condo Music" (feat. Wicced)

Gucci Mane - The State vs. Radric Davis II: The Caged Bird Sings

- 12. "Fugitive" (feat. Peewee Longway & Young Dolph)

=== 2014 ===
K Camp - In Due Time

- 03. Make A Wish"

Future - Honest

- 02. "T-Shirt"

Future - Monster

- 06. "Throw Away"
- 09. "2Pac"

Rich The Kid - Feels Good To Be Rich

- 03. "Came From Nothin"
- 18. "Feels Good 2 Be Rich"

Project Pat - Cheez n Dope 3

- 05. - "Rubber Bands" (feat. Juicy J)
- 10. - "A1 s" (feat. Juicy J)
- 13. - "Kitchen Feat Shy Glizzy Cash Out"

=== 2015 ===
Ty Dolla Sign - Free TC

- 03. "Straight Up" (feat. Jagged Edge)

Puff Daddy - MMM (Money Making Mitch)

- 01. "Facts"
- 09. "Happily Ever After (Interlude)"
- 14. "Uptown (Shout-Out-Skit)" (feat. Brucie B)

Project Pat - Street God

- 16. "A1s" (feat. Juicy J)

2 Chainz - Trapavelli Tre

- 04. "Everything I Know"
- 16. "Blue Dolphin" (feat. Betty Idol)

=== 2016 ===
Sosamann - Sauce Eskobar

- 14. "Right Back" (feat. Sancho Saucy)

Jose Guapo - Extravagant Trench Shit

- 01. "From My Heart" (produced with XL Eagle)
- 02. "Off Top"
- 03. "#TeamLitty" (feat. XVL Hendrix) (produced with XL Eagleand Zaytoven)
- 04. "No Favors" (produced with XL Eagle)
- 05. "Ape Shxt" (produced with XL Eagle, Bobby Kritical and DJ Plugg)
- 06. "You Won't" (feat. XVL Shot)
- 07. "Shake That Ass" (produced with XL Eagle)
- 08. "Unheard Of"
- 09. "Make It Right" (feat. Natasha Mosley) (produced with XL Eagle)
- 10. "Compete (produced with XL Eagle)
- 11. "Where Is The Luv"
- 12. "Love & Drugs" (produced with XL Eagle)

Street Money Boochie & Tracy T - Diamonds, Money & Dope

- 07. "Know the Feeling" (produced with Shawty Fresh)

Future - Purple Reign

- 05. "Inside the Mattress" (produced with XL Eagle)

Project Pat - Street God 2

- 03. "I'm Dat Nigga"
- 10. "I'm Good"

Trouble - Skoobzilla

- 01. "TIP Jeezy Boosie"
- 05. "Traffic" (feat. Spodee)
- 11. "Anyway/Everyday" (feat. Fetty Wap)

Young Dolph - King of Memphis

- 09. "On My Way" (produced with XL Eagle)

Lil Uzi Vert - The Perfect Luv Tape

- 10. "Seven Million" (feat. Future) (produced with XL Eagle and Don Cannon)

Yung Booke - 6 the Giant

- 15. "Elevating"

K Camp - RARE

- 01. "No Question" (produced with Bobby Kritical, XL Eagle and Musik MajorX)
- 02. "Drag" (produced with Bobby Kritical, XL Eagle and Musik MajorX)
- 03. "Drop" (produced with Bobby Kritical, XL Eagle and Musik MajorX)
- 04. "Out the Loop" (feat. Trouble)
- 05. "F.A.C.T.S" (produced with Bobby Kritical, XL Eagle and Musik MajorX)
- 10. "It Ain't Fair" (produced with Bobby Kritical, XL Eagle and Musik MajorX)

=== 2017 ===
Migos - Culture

- 02. "T-Shirt" (produced with XL Eagle)

B Money - F.lip A.ll M.oney

- 01. "Cups of the XO"

=== 2018 ===
Jordan Kristine Seamon - Untitled EP

- 02. "Glo Up"

=== 2019 ===
D.C. Young Fly - Trapsoul

- Executive Album Producers

=== Upcoming ===
24hrs - Open Late

00. "VSVSVSV"

T-Wayne - TBA

00. "Rain Drop" (featuring Offset)
