= King of Memphis =

King of Memphis may refer to:

- Young Dolph - Adolph Robert Thornton Jr. (July 27, 1985 – November 17, 2021)
- King of Memphis (album), an album by Young Dolph
