= My Turn to Eat =

Studio album by Big Kuntry King
- Released: September 30, 2008
- Recorded: 2007–08
- Studios: Echo Studios (Atlanta, GA)
- Genre: Southern hip hop
- Length: 48:21
- Labels: Grand Hustle; Atlantic
- Producers: Jason Geter (exec.); T.I. (exec.); J.U.S.T.I.C.E. League; Kane Beatz; Keith Mack; Marvelous J; Nard & B; Shawty Redd; Tony Galvin

Singles from My Turn to Eat
- 1. "That's Right" Released: May 15, 2007; 2. "Da Baddest" Released: October 23, 2007

Professional ratings
Review scores
Source	Rating
AllMusic	3/5 stars
HipHopDX	2/5

My Turn to Eat is the debut solo studio album by American rapper Big Kuntry King. It was released on September 30, 2008, through Grand Hustle/Atlantic Records. Recording sessions took place at Echo Studios in Atlanta. Production was handled by Shawty Redd, Keith Mack, Marvelous J, Nard & B, J.U.S.T.I.C.E. League, Kane Beatz and Tony Galvin, with Jason Geter and T.I. serving as executive producers. It features guest appearances from Lil Duval, Lloyd, Ricco Barrino, Trey Songz, Young Dro, Yung L.A., and his P$C groupmates T.I. and Mac Boney. The album debuted at number 98 on the Billboard 200 and number 13 on the Top R&B/Hip-Hop Albums charts with 6,000 copies sold in the United States in the first week of its release.

The album's lead single "That's Right" was released on May 15, 2007. The music video for the song, released on November 13, 2007, was shot in front of T.I.'s nightclub, Club Crucial, in Atlanta. Comedian Lil Duval along with several Grand Hustle recording artists such as Young Dro, Alfamega and Xtaci make cameo appearances. The second single off of the album, "Da Baddest", was released on October 23, 2007. Its music video, released on July 29, 2008, was also shot in Atlanta, with cameo appearances from T.I., DJ Drama, Maino, B.o.B and Fantasia. Neither single charted.

== Track listing ==
No.	Title	Writer(s)	Producer(s)	Length
1.	"Intro" (featuring Lil Duval)	Sean Merrett; James Rosser; Brandon Rackley	Nard & B	2:12
2.	"Tool in Da Pocket"	Merrett; Keith McMasters	Keith Mack	4:05
3.	"Da Baddest" (featuring Trey Songz)	Merrett; Tremaine Neverson; Demetrius Stewart	Shawty Redd	3:52
4.	"We Iz"	Merrett; Erik Ortiz; Kevin Crowe	J.U.S.T.I.C.E. League	3:55
5.	"Pots and Pans"	Merrett; Stewart	Shawty Redd	4:37
6.	"Soul of a Man" (featuring Ricco Barrino)	Merrett; McMasters	Keith Mack	4:50
7.	"Love You the Right Way" (featuring Lloyd)	Merrett; Lloyd Polite; Daniel Johnson	Kane Beatz	4:08
8.	"We Here"	Merrett; Stewart	Shawty Redd	4:34
9.	"Focus" (featuring Young Dro)	Merrett; Anthony Galvin	Tony Galvin	4:04
10.	"Posse" (featuring Mac Boney and Yung L.A.)	Merrett; Nathaniel Josey; Jeffery White	Marvelous J	4:10
11.	"Yeah (I'm On It)"	Merrett; White	Marvelous J	3:59
12.	"That's Right" (featuring T.I.)	Merrett; Clifford Harris; Rosser; Rackley	Nard & B	3:55
Total length:				48:21

== Personnel ==
- Sean "Big Kuntry King" Merrett – vocals, co-producer
- Roland "Lil Duval" Powell – vocals (track 1)
- Tremaine "Trey Songz" Neverson – vocals (track 3)
- Kassim Vonricco "Ricco Barrino" Washington – vocals (track 6)
- Lloyd Polite – vocals (track 7)
- D'Juan "Young Dro" Hart – vocals (track 9)
- Nathaniel "Mac Boney" Josey – vocals (track 10)
- Leland "Yung L.A." Austin – vocals (track 10)
- Clifford "T.I." Harris – vocals (track 12), executive producer
- James "Nard" Rosser – producer (tracks: 1, 12)
- Brandon "B" Rackley – producer (tracks: 1, 12)
- Bryan "Keith Mack "McMasters – producer (tracks: 2, 6)
- Demetrius "Shawty Redd" Stewart – producer (tracks: 3, 5, 8)
- Erik "Rook" Ortiz – producer (track 4)
- Kevin "Colione" Crowe – producer (track 4)
- Daniel "Kane Beatz" Johnson – producer (track 7)
- Anthony David "Tony" Galvin – producer (track 9)
- Jeffery "Marvelous J" White – producer (tracks: 10, 11)
- Daniel Pollard – recording (tracks: 1–10, 12)
- Daryl Morris – recording (tracks: 3, 5–8, 10)
- Elliot Carter – recording (track 11)
- Ray Seay – mixing
- Jason Geter – executive producer, A&R, management
- Gregory Burke – art direction, design
- Zach Wolfe – photography
- Zachariah Mattheus – package layout
- Mike Lace – A&R, management
- Hannah Kang – A&R
- Kirsten Daniel – A&R
- Lanre Gaba – A&R
- Clay Evans – management

== Charts ==
Chart (2008)	Peak position
US Billboard 200	98
US Top R&B/Hip-Hop Albums (Billboard)	13
