= High Times (Young Dro album) =

Studio album by Young Dro
- Released: October 15, 2013
- Recorded: 2012–2013
- Genre: Hip-hop
- Length: 55:48
- Labels: Grand Hustle; eOne; Atlantic
- Producers: Candice Mims; Childish Major; C4; DJ Mustard; FKi; Lil' C; Stroud; Ensayne Wayne; 6Mile Jp; She'kspere; Ronnie D; Smash Factory; Sauce Lord Rich; Big Zar; OG Whitehouse; Marz

Young Dro chronology
Best Thang Smokin' (2006)	High Times (2013)	Da Reality Show (2015)

Singles from High Times
- 1. "FDB" Released: March 28, 2013; 2. "Strong" Released: September 30, 2013

High Times is the third studio album by American rapper Young Dro. The album was released on October 15, 2013, by Grand Hustle Records and eOne Music. The album features guest appearances from Forgeeauto, Mac Boney, T.I., Spodee, Problem, Natasha Mosley, Blu June, Doe B and Miloh Smith. The album was met with generally positive reviews from music critics, and debuted at number 57 on the US Billboard 200 chart.

== Release and promotion ==
On June 17, 2013, Young Dro released the mixtape Day Two in promotion for the album. On July 10, 2013, Young Dro announced he would be releasing his second studio album titled High Times in October 2013. On September 18, 2013, the album cover was released and it was announced that the album would be released on October 15, 2013. On September 30, 2013, the track listing was released revealing guest appearances on the album from Forgeeauto, Mac Boney, T.I., Spodee, Problem, Natasha Mosley, Blu June, Doe B and Miloh Smith.

On March 28, 2013, the album's first single "FDB" was released. On May 30, 2013, the music video was released for "FDB". On August 26, 2013, the "FDB" (Remix) featuring DJ Drama, French Montana, T.I. and Trinidad James was released. On August 28, 2013, a second "FDB" (Remix) was released featuring B.o.B, Wale and Chief Keef. On September 30, 2013, the album's second single "Strong" was released. On November 14, 2013, the remix to "Strong" featuring 2 Chainz was released.

== Critical reception ==
Professional ratings
Review scores
Source	Rating
AllMusic	3.5/5 stars
XXL	3/5 (L)

High Times was met with generally positive reviews from music critics. David Jeffries of AllMusic gave the album three and a half stars out of five, saying "Dro is mainstream street and not as odd as his backbeats with lines like 'I'm in the hotel with two lesbians, where the fuck you all at?', being the kind of brazen baller talk that the rapper considers his comfort zone, but he slings slang, slurs words, and uses his Atlanta drawl to stretch insults into lazy putdowns that are devastating, so take all that into account. Take high-caliber kiss-offs like the guitar-crunching 'Hammer Time' ('If a nigga think he better, I forgive him') and 'I'm Cold' ('I got money like the Clampetts, Jethro') into account as well, and think of High Times as a narrow, approachable, and no-crossover type of album, plus a good reason to go searching the Young Dro mixtape section at your neighborhood bootlegger or local Internet." Dave William of XXL gave the album an L, saying "The tape leaves you with a number of enjoyable moments, like [...] 'Odds', and 'FDB' as well as the buddy-buddy Doe-B featuring record 'Homeboyz' and a stone cold, guitar-driven track by the name of 'Hammer Time'. Hip-hop fans are lucky to have a wide swath of artists experimenting with new sounds, evolving into grown ups, and collaborating with producers and artists of other genres, but we're equally blessed to have folks like Young Dro. That is, the same Dro you grew to enjoy when you first met him when he first introduced us to shoulder leanin' and 'pimpin' in linen and salamander sandals'."

== Commercial performance ==
The album debuted at number 57 on the Billboard 200 chart, with first-week sales of 6,000 copies in the United States.

== Track listing ==
No.	Title	Producer(s)	Length
1.	"Odds" (featuring Forgeeauto and Mac Boney)	Stroud; Candice Mims; Childish Major; C4	5:07
2.	"Power Up"	Lil' C	3:16
3.	"Strong"	DJ Mustard	2:53
4.	"Bad Bitch" (featuring T.I., Spodee and Problem)	Smash Factory	4:32
5.	"FDB"	FKi	3:40
6.	"Djuan & Spodee" (featuring Spodee)	6 Mile JP; Ensayne Wayne	4:31
7.	"Hammer Time" (featuring Spodee)	Stroud	4:05
8.	"Hello" (featuring Natasha Mosley)	Sauce Lord Rich; Big Zar	3:35
9.	"Nope" (featuring T.I.)	OG Whitehouse; 6 Mile Jp; Lil' C	4:23
10.	"Take You There" (featuring Natasha Mosley)	Lil' C; Marz	2:48
11.	"I’m Cold"	She'ksphere	3:55
12.	"Free Fall" (featuring Blu June)	Stroud	4:18
13.	"Homeboyz" (featuring Doe B)	Ronnie D	4:42
14.	"Corner Boys" (featuring Miloh Smith)	Stroud	3:43

== Chart positions ==
Chart (2013)	Peak position
US Billboard 200	57
US Top R&B/Hip-Hop Albums (Billboard)	13
