= The State vs. Radric Davis II: The Caged Bird Sings =

Mixtape by Gucci Mane
- Released: December 25, 2013
- Recorded: 2013
- Genre: Hip-hop
- Length: 60:02
- Label: 1017 Records; 101 Distribution
- Producer: 808 Mafia, Bankroll Clay, DJ Plugg, Drumma Boy, Honorable C.N.O.T.E., Mike Will Made It, Metro Boomin, Nard & B, Shawty Redd, TM88, Zaytoven

Gucci Mane chronology
Trust God Fuck 12 (2013)	The State vs. Radric Davis II: The Caged Bird Sings (2013)	Young Thugga Mane La Flare (2014)

The State vs. Radric Davis II: The Caged Bird Sings is a commercial mixtape by American rapper Gucci Mane. The project serves as a sequel to his sixth album The State vs. Radric Davis (2009). It was released on December 25, 2013, by 1017 Records and 101 Distribution. The project features guest appearances from Young Dolph, Migos, Young Scooter, Peewee Longway, Verse Simmonds, Rocko and Young Thug.

== Track listing ==
No.	Title	Producer(s)	Length
1.	"Pull Up On Ya"	Metro Boomin	2:52
2.	"Jackie Chan" (featuring Migos)	Zaytoven	4:11
3.	"#Mentionme"	Mike Will Made It	3:14
4.	"Rude"	Drumma Boy	3:43
5.	"Birdman"	Bankroll Clay	3:12
6.	"Double"	Honorable C.N.O.T.E.	3:29
7.	"Bad Bitch"	Southside, TM88	3:14
8.	"Tell Me Nothing" (featuring Young Scooter)	Shawty Redd	3:49
9.	"Too Many"	Honorable C.N.O.T.E.	3:00
10.	"Wish You Was Me"	TM88; Bankroll Clay (co.)	3:10
11.	"Ice Cold" (featuring Verse Simmonds)	DJ Plugg	5:05
12.	"Fugitive" (featuring Peewee Longway & Young Dolph)	Nard & B	4:52
13.	"Feets" (featuring Rocko)	Tarentino	3:09
14.	"Buttnaked"	Zaytoven	3:34
15.	"Any Thing" (featuring Young Thug)	Purps	4:10
16.	"Do It"	Zaytoven	3:23
17.	"Threw With That Shit"	Honorable C.N.O.T.E.	4:21
Total length:			60:02

== Charts ==
Chart (2014)	Peak position
US Top R&B/Hip-Hop Albums (Billboard)	31
US Independent Albums (Billboard)	38
