= Trap House 4 =

Mixtape by Gucci Mane
- Released: July 4, 2014
- Genre: Hip-hop
- Length: 60:01
- Label: 1017 Records, 101 Distribution
- Producer: Zaytoven, Drumma Boy, Mike Will Made It, Southside, Honorable C.N.O.T.E., Purps On The Beat, Kevin McCall, C4, Tarentino, Young Chop, Bankroll Clay

Gucci Mane chronology
World War 3D (2014)	Trap House 4 (2014)	Felix Brothers (2014)

Trap House 4 is a commercial mixtape by American rapper Gucci Mane. The project serves as a sequel to Trap House III (2013). The project was released on July 4, 2014, by 1017 Brick Squad Records and 101 Distribution. The project features guest appearances from Chief Keef, K Camp, Young Scooter and Fredo Santana. The project features production from Zaytoven, Drumma Boy, Mike WiLL Made-It, Southside, Kevin McCall, C4, Tarentino, Young Chop and Bankroll Clay, among others.

== Track listing ==
No.	Title	Producer(s)	Length
1.	"Intro"	Zaytoven	1:36
2.	"Already"	Drumma Boy	3:40
3.	"Top In the Trash" (featuring Chief Keef)	Mike Will Made It	3:50
4.	"Bet Money" (featuring K Camp)	Southside	3:35
5.	"She Loves Money"	Southside	3:28
6.	"Drugs Like You"	Honorable C. Note	3:50
7.	"Fuck Niggas"	Purps	3:16
8.	"Never Had Shit"	Kevin McCall	3:05
9.	"Standing In Line"	C4	3:58
10.	"Bigger Picture"	Tarentino	3:17
11.	"Dope Love"	Drumma Boy	3:23
12.	"Nasty"	C4	3:31
13.	"Spit In Yo Face"	Zaytoven	2:08
14.	"Jugg House" (featuring Young Scooter & Fredo Santana)	Young Chop	3:48
15.	"Bum Bum"	Mike Will Made It	3:45
16.	"I'm So Numb"	Bankroll Clay	3:29
17.	"How We Rockin"	C4	3:00
18.	"Reminise"	Tarentino	3:15
19.	"Outro"	Honorable C. Note	1:26

== Charts ==
Chart (2014)	Peak position
US Billboard 200	153
US Top R&B/Hip-Hop Albums (Billboard)	27
US Top Rap Albums (Billboard)	15
US Independent Albums (Billboard)	23
