= Crack baby (disambiguation) =

Crack baby may refer to:

- Rich Crack Baby
- Crack Baby Athletic Association
- "Crack Baby", a song by Mitski from the album Puberty 2
