= Tha Connect =

Studio album by Willy Northpole
- Released: June 23, 2009
- Recorded: 2007–09
- Genre: Hip hop
- Length: 48:57
- Label: Disturbing tha Peace; Def Jam
- Producer: Chaka Zulu (exec.); Jeff Dixon (exec.); Ludacris (exec.); Bangladesh; Blac Elvis; Jelly Roll; Khao; LT Moe; Marc Coleman; M. Rell; Nard & B; Reefa; Tha Bizness; Willy Northpole; Wonka

Singles from Tha Connect
- 1. "Hood Dreamer" Released: March 27, 2009; 2. "Body Marked Up" Released: April 28, 2009; 3. "#1 Side Chick" Released: July 1, 2009

Professional ratings
Review scores
Source	Rating
AllMusic	3.5/5 stars
HipHopDX	3/5
RapReviews	7.5/10

Tha Connect is the debut studio album by American rapper Willy Northpole from Phoenix, Arizona. It was released on June 23, 2009 via Disturbing tha Peace. Production was handled by several record producers, including Reefa, Bangladesh, Blac Elvis, LT Moe, Nard & B and Tha Bizness. It features guest appearances from B.o.B., Bobby V and Ne-Yo.

== Background ==
The album concept is the connecting hip hop listeners to a new state, Arizona. The album was in the works for several years and was originally slated for a release of winter 2008, but a conflict with fellow member of DTP Ludacris set the album back to June 2, 2009. Later the album was pushed to June 23, 2009. The album had 50 songs that were slimmed down to 12 songs, taking nearly 6 months. The album had several big hits that were "Too Big" for his first album. The album promotion was set up to be big with commercials during the BET Awards and billboards of the album but once the death of Michael Jackson all the promotion was dropped and the buzz for the album was gone.

== Track listing ==
No.	Title	Writer(s)	Producer(s)	Length
1.	"Intro"	William Adams; Kevin Cates; Marc Coleman	Khao; Coleman	2:56
2.	"Hood Shit"	Adams; M. Rell	M. Rell	3:07
3.	"The Story"	Adams; Sharif Slater	Reefa	3:28
4.	"How Hard" (Skit)	Adams	Willy Northpole	1:46
5.	"Body Marked Up"	Adams; Henri Verreault; Rich Harrison; Garrett Hamler; Beyoncé Knowles; Kelendria Rowland; Michelle Williams; Dwayne Carter; Clifford Harris	Wonka	4:01
6.	"Hood Dreamer" (featuring B.o.B.)	Adams; Bobby Simmons Jr.; Brandon Rackley; James Rosser; Clarence Montgomery III	Nard & B	4:38
7.	"Feeling Alright"	Adams; Chris Whitacre; Justin Henderson	Tha Bizness	3:12
8.	"Ghetto Tour Guide" (Skit)	Adams	Bangladesh	0:23
9.	"Ghetto Tour Guide"	Adams; Shondrae Crawford	Bangladesh	4:02
10.	"#1 Side Chick" (featuring Bobby V)	Adams; Bobby Wilson; Cates; Coleman	Khao; Coleman	4:31
11.	"Vegas Lights"	Adams; Todd Moore	LT Moe	4:08
12.	"The Life" (featuring Ne-Yo)	Adams; Shaffer Smith; Elvis Williams; Cotrell Qualls	Blac Elvis	3:47
13.	"Dear Lord"	Adams; Slater; David Buchanan	Reefa	2:39
14.	"At Salt's Grave" (Skit)	Adams; David Drew	Willy Northpole	1:30
15.	"Heaven"	Adams; Drew	Jelly Roll	4:49
16.	"Get Up, Get Down (iTunes Bonus Track)"		Bangladesh; Chase N. Cashe	3:10
Total length:				48:57

Sample credits

- Track 5 contains samples from "Soldier", performed by Destiny's Child featuring T.I. and Lil Wayne

== Music videos ==
- Hood Dreamer - (April 13, 2009)
- Body Marked Up - (May 9, 2009)
- Ghetto Tour Guide - (May 11, 2009)
- 1 Side Chick - (July 1, 2009)

== Chart positions ==
Chart (2009)	Peak position
US Top R&B/Hip-Hop Albums (Billboard)	47
US Top Rap Albums (Billboard)	21
