= Gelato (mixtape) =

Mixtape by Young Dolph
- Released: February 2, 2017
- Length: 37:42
- Label: Paper Route Empire
- Producers: Drumma Boy; Izze The Producer; Reazy Renegade; TM88; Zaytoven

Young Dolph chronology
Rich Crack Baby (2016)	Gelato (2017)	Bulletproof (2017)

Singles from Gelato
- 1. "Bagg" Released: January 4, 2017

Gelato is the sixteenth solo mixtape by American rapper Young Dolph. The mixtape was released on February 2, 2017, by Paper Route Empire. The mixtape features guest appearances from Wiz Khalifa, Migos and Lil Yachty. Meanwhile, the production includes Zaytoven, Izze The Producer and Drumma Boy, among others. It was supported by one single, "Bagg".

== Singles ==
The lead single for the album, "Bagg" was released on January 4, 2017.

== Track listing ==
Gelato
No.	Title	Writer(s)	Producer(s)	Length
1.	"Gelato"	Adolph Thornton, Jr.; Hayward Ivy	Izze The Producer	3:24
2.	"Baller Alert"	Thornton, Jr.; Izell Staton	Izze The Producer	3:31
3.	"On the River" (featuring Wiz Khalifa)	Thornton, Jr.; Staton; Cameron Thomaz	Izze The Producer	3:18
4.	"Whole Lot"	Thornton, Jr.; Staton	Izze The Producer	2:56
5.	"Drop It Off" (featuring Migos)	Thornton, Jr.; Xavier Dotson; Quavious Marshall; Kirshnik Ball; Kiari Cephus	Zaytoven	2:45
6.	"Run It Up"	Thornton, Jr.; Bryan Johnson	Reazy Renegade	2:32
7.	"Yeezy"	Thornton, Jr.; Christopher Gholson	Drumma Boy	3:01
8.	"Bagg" (featuring Lil Yachty)	Thornton, Jr.; Bryan Simmons; Miles McCollum	TM88	4:58
9.	"Special"	Thornton, Jr.; Staton	Izze The Producer	3:09
10.	"Meech"	Thornton, Jr.; Staton	Izze The Producer	2:58
11.	"Play wit Yo Bitch"	Thornton, Jr.; Dotson	Zaytoven	5:10
Total length:				37:42

== Charts ==
Chart (2017)	Peak position
US Billboard 200	54
US Top R&B/Hip-Hop Albums (Billboard)	22
