= Take Off (Young Dro song) =

Single by Young Dro featuring Yung L.A.

from the album P.O.L.O. (Players Only Live Once) (shelved)
- Released: March 17, 2009
- Genre: Hip hop
- Length: 4:02
- Label: Grand Hustle, Atlantic
- Songwriters: Shamann Cooke, Djuan Montrel Hart, Leland Sanford Austin
- Producer: Beat Billionaire

Young Dro singles chronology
"Ain't I" (2008)	"Take Off" (2009)	"Checkin' My Fresh" (2009)

Yung L.A. singles chronology
"Ain't I" (2008)	"'Take Off'" (2009)	"Futuristic Love (Elroy)" (2009)

"Take Off" is a song by American hip hop recording artist Young Dro, released as a single on March 17, 2009. The song was initially meant to be first single from second studio album, then-titled P.O.L.O. (Players Only Live Once). The song, produced by Beat Billionaire, features fellow American rapper and Dro's former protege Yung L.A. The song was leaked on November 11, 2008, but was officially released on iTunes on March 17, 2009.

== Music video ==
The music video was filmed in Atlanta on April 3, 2009. It was directed by Gabriel Hart. There are cameo appearances from Big Kuntry King, T.I., J-Money, DJ Drama and more. It appeared as the New Joint of The Day on 106 & Park, on May 14.

== Charts ==
Chart (2009)	Peak position
US Hot R&B/Hip-Hop Songs (Billboard)	71
