= Da Reality Show =

Studio album by Young Dro
- Released: September 18, 2015
- Recorded: 2014–2015
- Genre: Hip-hop
- Length: 35:36
- Label: Grand Hustle; eOne
- Producer: T.I. (exec.); Jason Geter (exec.); Cheeze Beatz; Lil' C; Mars of 1500 or Nothin'; Zaytoven; Stroud; AudioKlique

Young Dro chronology
High Times (2013)	Da Reality Show (2015)	Da' Real Atlanta (2017)

Singles from Da Reality Show
- 1. "We in da City" Released: March 3, 2015; 2. "Ugh" Released: August 21, 2015

Da Reality Show is the fourth studio album by the American hip-hop recording artist Young Dro. It was released on September 18, 2015, by Grand Hustle Records and Entertainment One Music.

== Release and promotion ==
"My life is a reality show, with the ups and the downs. This record 'We in da City' is my reality coming up in my city. My new album will be filled with twists and turns!"

— Young Dro discussing the album's title and lead single.

On March 3, 2015, the song titled "We in da City", was released as the album's first single via digital distribution. The song, produced by Cheeze Beatz, was accompanied by a music video, released on April 26, 2015. "We in da City" was later remixed with a new verse from Dro's Grand Hustle label boss T.I., which was released on July 10, 2015. The single reached number two on the US Bubbling Under R&B/Hip-Hop Singles chart.

The album's second single, "Ugh", produced by Zaytoven, was released on August 21, 2015. On August 5, 2015, Dro released a mixtape to promote the album, titled Hellcat, produced entirely by Zaytoven. The music video for "Ugh" was premiered on September 9, 2015.

== Critical reception ==
The album received mixed reviews, with a 7.4 out of 10 from Pitchfork and a 2 out of 5 from HipHopDX. Critics responded positively to the single "Ugh", "a melodic and busy hymnal", and praising its "tight flow and catchy hook".

Alex Dionisio of Examiner.com, gave the album one out of five stars, writing, "In too many parts of Da Reality Show, Young Dro just hoots and hollers like a banshee, dissing his haters, threatening and perpetrating violence, arranging drug packages, taking the initiative to rep his own status and complaining about his sorry chances in life... the most troubling trait of Da Reality Show is its dumbed down gangsterism. Young Dro has some impressive vocal endurance, but what is the point if it is wasted on subject matter and tones that never enrich the listeners?"

== Track listing ==
No.	Title	Producer(s)	Length
1.	"Black History"	Lil' C; AudioKlique	0:58
2.	"Coupe"	Lil' C; AudioKlique	2:07
3.	"Dead"	Mars	3:51
4.	"We in da City"	Cheeze Beatz	3:25
5.	"Ugh"	Zaytoven	3:15
6.	"Parallel Park" (featuring Trigga)	30 Roc	4:02
7.	"Power" (featuring Hollywood Luck)	Lil' C; AudioKlique	3:29
8.	"It's Whatever" (featuring DB Bantino)	Stroud	3:14
9.	"Hustle Gang"	Zaytoven	2:59
10.	"Feeling Myself" (featuring Candice Mims)	Stroud	3:20
11.	"Testimonial" (featuring IYA)	Stroud	0:58
12.	"Hood Gospel" (featuring Ricco Barrino)	Stroud	3:58
Total length:			35:36

== Personnel ==
Credits for Da Reality Show adapted from AllMusic

- DB Bantino – featured artist
- Ricco Barrino – featured artist
- Danielle Brimm – management, production
- Deunte Butler – composition
- JD Butler – engineering, mixing
- C-Gutta – mixing
- Cheezebeatz – production
- Xavier Dotson – composition
- Clay Evans – associate production
- Isabel Evans – A&R
- Jason Geter – associate production
- Paul Grosso – creative direction
- D'Juan Hart – composition
- Terrence Hawkins – executive production
- IYA – featured artist
- Andrew Kelley – art direction, design
- Cam Kirk – photography
- Colin Leonard – mastering
- Lil' C – production
- Hollywood Luck – featured artist
- Thomas "Tillie" Mann – mixing
- John McDonald – senior production
- Candice Mims – featured artist
- Victor Morante – direction
- 30 Roc – production
- Angelina Sherie – strings
- Elliot Stroud – composition, production
- Julia Sutowski – production coordination
- Trigga – featured artist
- Wheezy – production
- Young Dro – primary artist
- Zaytoven – production
