= 100 Shots =

Single by Young Dolph

from the album Bulletproof
- Written: 2017
- Released: August 20, 2017
- Recorded: 2016
- Genre: Hip hop
- Length: 3:22
- Label: Paper Route Empire
- Songwriters: Adolph Thornton Jr; Joshua Cross; Quincy Lamont Williams
- Producer: DJ Squeeky

Young Dolph singles chronology
"Play Wit Yo Bitch"
(2016)
"100 Shots"
(2017)
"Bagg
(featuring Lil Yachty)"
(2017)

"100 Shots" is a song by American rapper Young Dolph, released on August 20, 2017. It later appeared on his second studio album Bulletproof. The track was created in response to a real-life shooting incident involving Dolph earlier that year.

== Background and release ==
The song references a February 2017 shooting in Charlotte, North Carolina, during which over 100 rounds were reportedly fired at a vehicle carrying Dolph before a CIAA basketball match located close to an apartment building at 8th and North Caldwell Street. Around 6:30 p.m. his vehicle was struck multiple times. Outlets stated that more than 100 rounds were fired at the SUV Dolph was in, though he was not injured during the incident.

A major reason he survived, according to police and media reports at the time, was that his SUV was equipped with bullet-resistant protection, which absorbed the brunt of the gunfire. Dolph wasted no time clapping back at his attackers on Twitter, posting "u loose," and showed up to perform at a club that very same night. In an interview with XXL, when asked about the situation, Dolph claimed that he had "no clue" who had tried to shoot him down.

The song was released on August 20, 2017 and gained significant attention following its release and contributed to the success of Bulletproof, which debuted at number 36 on the Billboard 200.

== Composition ==
"100 Shots" serves as the opening track of Bulletproof, The song was produced by Memphis-based DJ Squeeky, and written by Dolph alongside Joshua Cross and Quincy Lamont Williams.

== Reception ==
"100 Shots" was included on the "101 Best Songs of 2017" list by The Fader, where it ranked at number 81. In an editorial tribute, Rose Lilah of HotNewHipHop described the song as a “hard-hitting trap banger.” Preezy in a review of Bulletproof, for XXL described "100 Shots" as a hard-hitting trap record that sets the tone for the project. The song was noted for its defiant delivery and references to the 2017 Charlotte shooting, which frame it as a statement of resilience and survival.

=== Accolades ===
Accolades for 100 Shot
Publication	Accolade	Rank	Ref.
The Fader	101 Best Songs of 2017	81	

== Credits and personnel ==
Credits adapted from Apple Music.

Personnel

- Adolph Robert Thornton Jr – Vocals, Lyrics, Composer, Songwriter
- Joshua Crossr – Songwriter
- Quincy Lamont Williams – Songwriter
- DJ Squeeky – Producer
- Ari Morris – Mixing Engineer, Mastering Engineer

== Charts ==
Chart (2017)	Peak position
US Bubbling Under Hot 100 (Billboard)	10
US Hot R&B/Hip-Hop Songs (Billboard)	49

== Certifications ==
Certifications for "100 Shots"
Region	Certification	Certified units/sales
United States (RIAA)	Platinum	1,000,000^{‡}
^{‡} Sales+streaming figures based on certification alone.
