= We in da City =

Single by Young Dro

from the album Da Reality Show
- Released: March 3, 2015
- Genre: Hip hop
- Length: 3:28
- Label: eOne; Grand Hustle
- Songwriters: D'Juan Hart; Deshawn Kennedy; Dina Marto; Darryl McCorkell; Irvin Whitlow
- Producer: Cheeze Beatz

Young Dro singles chronology
"Nasty" (2014)	"We in da City" (2015)	"Ugh" (2015)

"We in da City" is a song by American rapper Young Dro. It was released on March 3, 2015, as the first single from his fourth studio album, Da Reality Show (2015). The track, produced by Cheeze Beatz, peaked at number two on the Bubbling Under R&B/Hip-Hop Singles chart.

== Release ==
The song premiered on February 27, 2015, while as a single on iTunes Store was released on March 3, 2015. An official remix featuring rapper T.I. premiered on July 9, 2015, and was released for digital download on iTunes the next day. "We in da City" is the first single of Dro's Da Reality Show album, which was released in September 2015.

== Music video ==
A music video for "We in da City" premiered via Dro's VEVO channel on April 26, 2015. It was directed by Cricket.

== Live performances ==
Dro and T.I. performed the song at the BET Hip Hop Awards on October 9, 2015.

== In popular culture ==
In October 2016, the song was played in the eighth episode of comedy-drama television series Atlanta's first season.

== Charts ==
Chart (2015)	Peak position
US Bubbling Under R&B/Hip-Hop Singles (Billboard)	2
