= FDB (song) =

Single by Young Dro

from the album High Times
- Released: March 28, 2013
- Recorded: 2012
- Genre: Hardcore hip hop; trap
- Length: 3:40
- Label: Grand Hustle; eOne Music; Atlantic
- Songwriters: D'Juan Hart; Stephen Bolden; Markous Robert
- Producer: FKi

Young Dro singles chronology
"She Like It" (2013)	"FDB" (2013)	"Poppin' 4 Sum" (2013)

"FDB" (acronym for "Fuck Dat Bitch") is a song by American rapper Young Dro, released on March 28, 2013, as the lead single from his second studio album High Times (2013). The track was produced by production team FKi. The song peaked at number two on the Billboard Bubbling Under Hot 100 Singles, becoming Young Dro's highest charting song since 2006's "Shoulder Lean", and matching the chart position of his other moderate hit, "Rubberband Banks".

== Background ==
On March 28, 2013, "FDB" was released as the lead single from Young Dro's second studio album High Times. Dro explained the song to XXL saying.

You could say that "F.D.B." about all my baby mamas. It was just at this point I got fed up. And hearing them talk about you. The bitch talking about "fuck me." Well, "fuck dat bitch." It came out naturally like that. It wasn't rehearsed or nothing. I say that shit all the time. If I really felt like it was a track for me to go straight to the studio and do I would have done so, but that right there was me having fun, making people laugh, and swagging, talking about $1000 shoes. It wasn't nothing I had to go and put my brain to.

== Critical reception ==
"FDB" was met with generally positive reviews from music critics. XXL named the song one of High Times' most enjoyable moments, also saying, "Under the song's polished and pristine finish, there's a sticky truth, a previously unsung realness blurred by black comedy and raucous punchlines." David Jeffries of AllMusic also praised the song, saying, "tracks like the minimal, mean, and infectious-as-poison-ivy number 'FDB' deserves to be lifted from the mixtape world and put on the turntable of every club."

== Music video ==
On May 29, 2013 the Phillyflyboy-directed music video for "FDB" premiered on MTV and Vevo. In the comedic video Young Dro plays a fight promoter who is setting up a match-up between two prize fighters. The video also features a cameo appearance by Lil Duval.

== Remixes ==
On August 26, 2013, the first official remix to "FDB" featuring DJ Drama, French Montana, T.I. and Trinidad James was released. The following day it was released to iTunes. Then on August 28, 2013, a second official remix "FDB" was released featuring B.o.B, Wale and Chief Keef.

Many rappers have also released their remixes and freestyles to the song including, Childish Gambino and 360.

== Charts ==
Chart (2013)	Peak position
US Bubbling Under Hot 100 (Billboard)	2
US Hot R&B/Hip-Hop Songs (Billboard)	30
