= Ricco Barrino =

- Born: Vonricco Washington; March 20, 1980 (age 46); High Point, North Carolina, United States
- Genres: R&B, soul, hip hop soul
- Occupation: Singer-songwriter
- Instrument: Vocals
- Years active: 2006–present
- Labels: Ghetto Allstars, Grand Hustle (current); Othaz (former)

Kassim Vonricco Washington (born March 20, 1980), best known by his stage name Ricco Barrino, is an American R&B singer and songwriter from High Point, North Carolina. He is also the brother of American Idol winner Fantasia Barrino and nephew of The Barrino Brothers. In 2006, he released his debut single "Bubble Gum".

In 2009, Barrino secured a recording contract with American rapper T.I.'s Grand Hustle Records. He has been featured on songs from several high-profile recording artists, including T.I.'s "Porn Star" from Paper Trail (2008), B.o.B's "5th Dimension" from The Adventures of Bobby Ray (2010) and Bone Thugs-n-Harmony's "Gone", from their reunion album Uni-5: The World's Enemy (2010).

== Musical career ==
In 2006, after hearing an Eminem song while at a strip club, Ricco Barrino was inspired to write a song titled "Bubble Gum", which became a local hit. The song, which was officially released as Barrino's debut single by North Carolina–based independent hip hop label Othaz Records, caught the attention of Grand Hustle co-founder Jason Geter and Atlantic records. In 2006, he made an appearance on his sister Fantasia Barrino's second album, Fantasia, on the song "Bore Me (Yawn)". He auditioned himself for the seventh season of American Idol, meeting the judges in the process and receiving an additional callback, but failing to advance to the Hollywood round. In 2008, Grand Hustle label-boss T.I., featured Barrino on a song titled "Porn Star", which was included on his multi-platinum sixth album Paper Trail. In 2009, Barrino obtained his first chart placement, with the single "Futuristic Love (Elroy)", which Barrino appeared on alongside Grand Hustle newcomer Yung L.A. The single reached number 55 on US Billboard Hot R&B/Hip-Hop Songs chart. In 2010, he made appearances on his sister's reality show Fantasia for Real.

On January 12, 2012, Ricco Barrino released a mixtape titled Twenty 12 Play. The mixtape's title is a play on fellow American singer R. Kelly's 1993 album 12 Play, which Barrino considers a huge influence on his music. He released another mixtape, titled Musical Evolution, on March 28, 2013, which was made available via the iTunes Store. On March 21, 2014, Barrino released his debut extended play (EP), titled From the Club to the Crib. The EP, which spawned the single "Drift", includes production from Grand Hustle in-house producer Keith Mack. In 2015, Barrino garnered more recognition when he was featured on the single "California" by American rapper Colonel Loud, which was considered a radio hit, among many including HipHopDX, HotNewHipHop, AllHipHop, Complex and more. On June 3, 2016, Barrino released an EP titled Vibes, in collaboration with frequent collaborator Tigo B.

== Discography ==
=== EPs ===
List of extended-plays, with selected details
Title	Details
From the Club to the Crib	Released: March 21, 2014; Label: Grand Hustle; Format: Digital download
Vibes (with Tigo B)	Released: June 3, 2016; Label: Self-released; Format: Digital download
Ferrari Infidelity EP	Released: August 20, 2020; Label: Self-released; Format: Digital download
Good	Released: August 13, 2020; Label: Self-released; Format: Digital download
Bad	Released: August 30, 2020; Label: Self-released; Format: Digital download
Ugly	Released: September 3, 2020; Label: Self-released; Format: Digital download

=== Mixtapes ===
List of mixtapes, with selected details
Title	Details
Twenty 12 Play	Released: January 12, 2012; Label: Grand Hustle; Format: Digital download
Musical Evolution	Released: March 28, 2013; Label: Self-released; Format: Digital download

=== Singles ===
List of singles, with selected chart positions, showing year released and album name
Title	Year	Peak chart positions		Certifications	Album
Title	Year	US	US R&B	Certifications	Album
"Bubble Gum"	2006	—	—		non-album single
"Go Head"	2010	—	—		Musical Evolution
"Hood" (featuring Fantasia)	2012	—	—		non-album single
"Drift"	2014	—	—		From the Club to the Crib
"Vibe" (featuring Tigo B)	2016	—	—		Vibes
"Come to the Money" (with Colonel Loud)	2016	—	—		non-album single
"Pray for Me"	2016	—	—		non-album single
"Serious" (with Colonel Loud)	2018	—	—		non-album single
"—" denotes a title that did not chart, or was not released in that territory.

==== As featured artist ====
List of singles by title, year, peak chart positions, and album
Title	Year	Peak chart positions		Album
Title	Year	US	R&B	Album
"Futuristic Love (Elroy)" (Yung L.A. featuring Ricco Barrino)	2009	—	55	non-album single
"Gone" (Bone Thugs-n-Harmony featuring Ricco Barrino)	2010	—	—	Uni5: The World's Enemy
"I'm Ready" (Total Kaos featuring Bigga Rankin, Doe B and Ricco Barrino)	2013	—	—	Dope Boi Bible
"One Night" (Yungin featuring Ricco Barrino)	2014	—	—	non-album single
"69" (Tigo B featuring Ricco Barrino)	2014	—	—	Rise: A Gemini Story
"Kuntry Love" (The Kuntry Boyz featuring Ricco Barrino)	2015	—	—	Kuntry Made Hood Raised
"California" (Colonel Loud featuring T.I., Young Dolph and Ricco Barrino)	2015	102	32	Plug Talk
"W.D.M.D" (DJ Echo featuring Ricco Barrino, Bettie Grind, Big Mike, Sequence and Fletcher)	2015	—	—	
"Ms. Carolina" (Jadon Success featuring Ricco Barrino)	2015	—	—	
"Known Unknown" (Joshua Gunn featuring Ricco Barrino)	2015	—	—	
"No Rachets" (Colonel Loud featuring Ricco Barrino)	2016	—	—	
"Want Your Body" (Mags Gabana featuring Ricco Barrino and Ivy Monae)	2016	—	—	
"—" denotes releases that did not chart or receive certification.

=== Guest appearances ===
List of non-single songs with guest appearances from Ricco Barrino
Title	Year	Album	Artist(s)
"Long Time Comin'"	2005	Da Vinci Code	—N/a
"Don't Hate"	2005	Da Vinci Code	P-Wonda, Juliani, O-Shabazz, Blu Raspberry
"Wrong Idea"	2005	Da Vinci Code	P-Wonda, Juliani, O-Shabazz, Big Sty
"All This Time"	2005	Rolling with the Punches	Brandon D.
"You Know What It Iz"	2005	Othaz Records Presents..... 2.3	P-Wonda
"Bore Me (Yawn)"	2006	Fantasia	Fantasia Barrino
"Propane"	2008	—N/a	T.I.
"Porn Star"	2008	Paper Trail	T.I.
"Soul of a Man"	2008	My Turn to Eat	Big Kuntry King
"Let Me Hold You"	2008	—N/a	Lil Duval, Cash Camp
"In the Shower"	2008	Respect the Hustle, Vol. 2	Young Dro
"Free"	2009	Unexpected	Angie Stone
"Everybody Know Me"	2009	Position of Power [Special Edition]	Juice, Alfamega, Roccett
"Take It Off"	2009	Trench Atlanta 2 (Nard & B Edition)	Lil Ru
"Rock wit You (Remix)"	2009	—N/a	Ace Hood, Busta Rhymes, Mistah F.A.B.
"From Nuthin"	2010	Cocaine 2	Big Kuntry King
"5th Dimension"	2010	B.o.B Presents: The Adventures of Bobby Ray	B.o.B
"Ooh Wee"	2010	Frontline	DJ E. Sudd, Tigo B
"In My Zone"	2010	—N/a	Mica Swain
"She Got It"	2010	New Moon	Mica Swain
"Grindin'"	2010	Ten Toes Down	8Ball & MJG
"Freak U"	2010	In the Building	Stuey Rock, Alley Boy
"Pay Up"	2011	Bang x3	Killer Mike
"Bananaz (Remix)"	2012	—N/a	Ray J, Rick Ross
"Chocolate Dream"	2012	Fruits of My Labor	Brisco
"Ms. Carolina"	2015	—N/a	Jadon Success
"Paid Like a MF"	2015	Plug Talk	Colonel Loud, Cap 1
"California"	2015	Plug Talk	Colonel Loud, Young Dolph
"Hood Gospel"	2015	Da Reality Show	Young Dro
"Beat It Up"	2016	Big Black & Ugly	Mike Digg
"Somebody"	2016	The D-Boy Diary: Book 1	E-40
"Solid"	2018	Dope$Ellit$Elf 2	RaRa
"How It Is"	2018	NAGA	B.o.B
"That Girl"	2019	Vernia	Erick Sermon, Big K.R.I.T.

== Music videos ==
=== As self ===
List of music videos of unreleased singles, with directors, showing year released
Title	Year	Director(s)
"Pray For Me"	2016	Dre Cannonz & Pocket Style
"Girlfriend"	2018	Cool Cannon
"Lose Control"	2018	Cool Cannon
"Baby"	2019	Cool Cannon
"You Let Me Down"	2020	Cool Cannon
'Woke Up" (featuring FreeDopeMajor)	2020	Cool Cannon
"Quavo"	2020	Cool Cannon
"Yea Yea"	2022	Cool Cannon
"Let's Dance" (featuring Fantasia)	2023	Nyrell Dwayne Griffith

=== As featured artist ===
List of music videos, with directors, showing year released
Title	Year	Director(s)
"California" (Colonel Loud featuring T.I., Young Dolph and Ricco Barrino)	2015	Iconick
