= Futuristic Love (Elroy) =

2009 single by Yung L.A. and Ricco Barrino

Single by Yung L.A. featuring Ricco Barrino

from the album Futuristic Leland
- Released: April 7, 2009
- Recorded: 2009
- Genre: Hip hop, R&B
- Length: 4:08
- Label: Grand Hustle Records, Interscope Records
- Songwriters: Leland Austin, Brandon Rackley, Ricco Barrino, James Bernard Rosser Jr.
- Producer: Nard & B

Yung L.A. singles chronology
"Take Off" (2009)	"Futuristic Love (Elroy)" (2009)	"36 O's" (2009)

"Futuristic Love (Elroy)" is a song by American hip hop recording artist Yung L.A. It was released as a single on April 7, 2009, by Grand Hustle Records and Interscope Records. The song, which was produced by Grand Hustle in-house production team Nard & B, features vocals from his then-Grand Hustle label-mate, Ricco Barrino. The song was originally released as the second single from Yung L.A.'s debut album Futuristic Leland, however the album would later be shelved. Since its release, the song has reached number 55 on the US Billboard Hot R&B/Hip-Hop Songs chart.

== Music video ==
The music video for the song was directed by Va$htie and filmed in Atlanta, Georgia. A behind the scenes video was released on May 18, 2009. The video features cameo appearances from Killer Mike, Lil Duval and Big Kuntry King. The music video premiered on June 10, 2009. In the video, Yung L.A. is seen driving a car (spoofing the 1985 science fiction film Back to the Future), which takes Yung L.A. back in time to the 1990s and allows him to meet an attractive girl. After spending time with her, he then takes her back to the present.

== Charts ==
Chart (2009)	Peak position
US Hot R&B/Hip-Hop Songs (Billboard)	55
