= Willy Northpole =

American rapper from Arizona

- Also known as: Willy Northpole
- Born: William Kenneth Adams; February 22, 1980 (age 46)
- Origin: Phoenix, Arizona, U.S.
- Genres: Hip hop
- Occupations: Rapper; songwriter; actor
- Years active: 2007–present
- Labels: Disturbing tha Peace; Def Jam; Alpha Howse

William Kenneth Adams (born February 22, 1980), professionally known as Willy Northpole, is an American rapper who was signed to Disturbing Tha Peace Records. He released his first album, Tha Connect in June 2009. He is from Phoenix, Arizona.

== Early life ==
Willy Northpole was born William Adams on February 22, 1980, in Phoenix, Arizona.

== Career ==
Willy then reconnected with his childhood friend Tiffany J., a one-time Power 92.3 on-air personality now turned producer and artist manager under Blue Williams at Family Tree Entertainment.

In 2007, he signed with Disturbing Tha Peace / Def Jam, becoming the only rap artist signed with the label from the western United States. He was also the only rapper signed with major distribution that was born and raised in Phoenix. In 2012, Willy Northpole left Disturbing Tha Peace.

Willy has recorded with rappers and producers including Ez Elpee, Shondrae of Bangladesh Productions, Trak Starz, Heatmakerz, Reefa, and Nitti.

On October 28, 2023, Willy did a cypher with Whitney Peyton and Bag of Tricks Cat called "The Goosebumps Cypher". In his lyrics, he announced that he is officially signed to Peyton's record, label Alpha Howse.

== Discography ==
=== Singles ===
- Body Marked Up
- Hood Dreamer
  1. 1 Side Chick

=== Albums ===
| Year | Title | Chart positions | | | | |
| Year | Title | U.S. 200 | U.S. R&B | U.S. Rap | CAN | UK |
|---|---|---|---|---|---|---|
| 2009 | Tha Connect: Release date: June 23, 2009; Label: Disturbing Tha Peace/Def Jam | - | 47 | 21 | — | — |
| 2024 | Broadway Theatre: Release date: August 16, 2024; Label: Alpha Howse | - | - | - | — | — |
