= Ain't I =

Single by Yung L.A. featuring T.I. and Young Dro

from the album Futuristic Leland
- Released: November 25, 2008
- Recorded: January 2008
- Genre: Hip hop
- Length: 4:12
- Label: Grand Hustle; Interscope
- Songwriters: Yung L.A.; Tremell Clemons; T.I.; Young Dro
- Producer: B Franks

Yung L.A. singles chronology
"Ain't I" (2008)	"Take Off" (2009)

T.I. singles chronology
"Just Like Me" (2008)	"Ain't I" (2008)	"Dead and Gone" (2009)

Young Dro singles chronology
"Tell 'Em What They Wanna Hear" (2006)	"Ain't I" (2008)	"Take Off" (2009)

Alternative cover

"Ain't I" is a song by American rapper Yung L.A., released as his debut single on November 25, 2008 via Grand Hustle and Interscope Records. The song was intended to be the lead single from his then-debut album Futuristic Leland, which was later shelved. The song, produced by B Franks, features guest appearances from his then-mentor Young Dro and Grand Hustle label-boss T.I., after the two remixed the song to release it commercially. Upon its release, the song reached number 47 on the US Billboard Hot 100 chart, on March 28, 2009. The single is a remix of the original version, which features Grand Hustle label-mate Big Kuntry King. "Ain't I" was nominated for "Best Collaboration" at the BET Awards.

== Music video ==
The Kai Crawford-directed music video was released on BET's 106 & Park on December 9, 2008. The video features cameo appearances from DJ Drama and Lil Duval. It managed to peak at number 2 on 106 & Park and ranked at number 87 on BET's Notarized: Top 100 Videos of 2009 countdown.

== Charts ==
=== Weekly charts ===
Chart (2008–2009)	Peak position
US Billboard Hot 100	47
US Hot R&B/Hip-Hop Songs (Billboard)	7
US Hot Rap Songs (Billboard)	4
US Rhythmic Airplay (Billboard)	17

=== Year-end charts ===
Chart (2009)	Position
US Hot R&B/Hip-Hop Songs (Billboard)	24

== Other versions ==
- "Ain't I (Original Version)" (Yung L.A. feat. Big Kuntry King)
- "Ain't I (Official Remix) Yung L.A., Young Dro & T.I.
- "Ain't I" (Lil' Wayne feat. Jae Millz of Dedication 3)
- "Ain't I (Remix)" (feat. Rick Ross, Maino, & Lil' Wayne)
- "Ain't I (Remix)" (feat. N.O.R.E.)
- "Ain't I" (Rick Ro$ & Triple C's off Purple Codeine 21)
- "Ain't I" (feat. Meek Mill)
- "Ain't I" (Ace Hood feat. Rick Ross, Lil Wayne & Maino)
- "Ain't I" (Ocean's 7 performed by Jermaine Dupri, Johnta Austin & Trey Songz)
- "Ain't I (Remix)" (Ya Boy feat. B Raw & Cik. Money)
- "Throwdest in the Game" (Chamillionaire)
