= Rich Crack Baby =

Mixtape by Young Dolph
- Released: August 26, 2016
- Length: 43:54
- Label: Paper Route Empire
- Producers: DJ Squeeky; Honorable C.N.O.T.E.; Izze The Producer; Tony Trouble; Yung Dev; Zaytoven

Young Dolph chronology
King of Memphis (2016)	Rich Crack Baby (2016)	Gelato (2017)

Rich Crack Baby is the fifteenth solo mixtape by American rapper Young Dolph. The mixtape was released on August 26, 2016, by Paper Route Empire. It features guest appearances from T.I., 21 Savage and Gucci Mane, among others. Meanwhile, the production includes Zaytoven, Honorable C.N.O.T.E., DJ Squeeky and Izze The Producer, among others.

== Track listing ==
Rich Crack Baby
No.	Title	Writer(s)	Producer(s)	Length
1.	"In My System" (featuring Boosie Badazz)	Adolph Thornton Jr.; Hayward Ivy; Torrence Hatch	DJ Squeeky	4:49
2.	"If"	Thornton Jr.; Ivy	DJ Squeeky	3:16
3.	"Trappa"	Thornton Jr.; Ivy	DJ Squeeky	3:27
4.	"What Yo Life Like" (featuring 2 Chainz)	Thornton Jr.; Xavier Dotson; Tauheed Epps	Zaytoven	3:00
5.	"Feet Up"	Thornton Jr.; Carlton Mays Jr.	Honorable C.N.O.T.E.	3:20
6.	"Star Power" (featuring Wale)	Thornton Jr.; Izell Staton; Olubowale Akintimehin	Izze The Producer	4:08
7.	"Foreva" (featuring T.I.)	Thornton Jr.; Anthony Frank; Clifford Harris Jr.	Tony Trouble	3:47
8.	"Nervous"	Thornton Jr.; Dotson	Zaytoven	2:50
9.	"Strippa" (featuring Gucci Mane)	Thornton Jr.; Dotson; Radric Davis	Zaytoven	3:33
10.	"150" (featuring 21 Savage)	Thornton Jr.; Dotson; Shayaa Abraham-Joseph	Zaytoven	2:32
11.	"Want It All"	Thornton Jr.; Ivy	DJ Squeeky	3:01
12.	"Nothin"	Thornton Jr.; Dotson	Zaytoven	2:50
13.	"Rich Crack Baby"	Thornton Jr.; Mays Jr.; Maurice Jordan	Honorable C.N.O.T.E.; Yung Dev	3:21
Total length:				43:54

== Charts ==
Chart (2017)	Peak position
US Billboard 200	132
US Top R&B/Hip-Hop Albums (Billboard)	14
