= Natasha Mosley =

American R&B singer from Atlanta, Georgia

- Born: October 3, 1990 (age 35); Atlanta, Georgia, U.S.
- Genres: R&B; trap
- Occupations: Singer; songwriter
- Label: ISO Music

Natasha Mosley (born October 3, 1990) is an American R&B singer-songwriter and actress from Atlanta, Georgia. Raised singing in church, Mosley is related to blues singer Bessie Smith and has cited Beyoncé, Mariah Carey, Christina Aguilera, Brandy, Tamia, Ne-Yo, Tank and Justin Timberlake among her influences.

Mosley first attracted wider attention with the 2011 single "Tattoo" and then through her feature on Jeremih's 2013 single "All the Time" with Lil Wayne, which later appeared on the soundtrack to Magic Mike XXL. She released her debut studio album, Rose Hall, in 2015, followed by Live Forever in 2018 and Natasha Mosley in 2022. Her recordings have been described as smooth and soulful, with a style that balances emotional storytelling and frankness, and she has spoken about becoming more comfortable recording sexually explicit material while coming from a church background.

== Life and career ==
Mosley was born in Atlanta, Georgia and spent her early years singing in church. Her first solo performance was the hymn "His Eye Is on the Sparrow", and she later performed in local talent shows before auditioning on the Apollo stage. At 18, she signed with music manager Michael Mauldin's ISO Music Group after being discovered by Atlanta-based businessman Isom Lowman and was placed in the girl groups The Feisty Girl Project and later Juice, mentored by Tiny Harris, before deciding to pursue a solo career. While a part of Juice, Mosley appeared in the series premiere of Tiny and Toya, which aired on June 30, 2009. Mosley had also auditioned for The Voice and American Idol. Mosley first gained attention with the single "Tattoo", which was released on September 15, 2011. The music video for the Tyga-assisted remix of the song was released in May 2012. Around the time, Mosley appeared on BET's 106 & Park, where she performed "Tattoo" alongside the previous single "Pretty" and premiered the music video for the latter.

In 2013, Mosley's voice reached a wider audience through her feature on Jeremih's "All the Time", a collaboration that also included Lil Wayne. "All the Time" peaked at number 24 on the US Billboard Bubbling Under Hot 100 chart and was certified 2x Platinum by the Recording Industry Association of America (RIAA). The song was later included on the soundtrack to Magic Mike XXL.

Mosley's debut studio album, Rose Hall, arrived on May 22, 2015, through ISO Music Group. The album featured production from FKi 1st, K.E. on the Track and Zaytoven. "Anything" served as the lead single from the album and has been described by music critics as an R&B track with a hip hop feel.

Mosley followed Rose Hall with Live Forever in 2018 and Natasha Mosley in 2022.

Mosley has two daughters. Mosley owns a hair care company Ahbella Beauty and a dispatch company Mosley Dispatch and Logistics.

== Artistry ==
Mosley's music has been described as rooted in R&B, with vocals that range from powerful and soulful to sweeter, softer tones. Her songs frequently center on relationships, heartbreak and emotional growth, and her public comments suggest she sees storytelling as a core part of her writing. Interview coverage has also linked her sound to R&B singers such as Brandy, Tamia and Beyoncé. In an interview with The Progress Report, she discussed becoming comfortable recording sexy music while coming from a church background and spoke about the project as part of her growth as an artist.

== Discography ==
=== Studio albums ===
- Rose Hall (2015)
- Live Forever (2018)
- Natasha Mosley (2022)

=== Singles ===
- "Pretty" (featuring Gucci Mane) (2011)
- "Tattoo" (solo or remix featuring Tyga) (2011)
- "Waiting for Snow" (2011)
- "Girls Do" (featuring Waka Flocka Flame) (2012)
- "This Time” (2012)
- "Sick" (2013)
- "Anything" (2014)
- "Make It Up" (2015)
- "Over" (2015)
- "Love Me Later" (2015)
- "Face in the Pillow" (2015)
- "Stranded" (2016)
- "Comin Back" (2016)
- "Re-Up" (2016)
- "Drunk" (featuring Gucci Mane) (2016)
- "Just for the Night" (2017)
- "Take Me" (2018)
- "100% Off" (2018)
- "Can't Wait" (2018)
- "Tit for Tat" (2019)
- "Beat It Up" (2020)
- "All I Want for Christmas Is You" (2020)
- "Say Yes" (2021)
- "Closer" (2021)
- "My Best Year" (2021)
- "What It Taste Like" (2022)
- "Fly Nights" (2023)
- "Questions?" (with Chris Voice and Whymen Grindin) (2023)
- "Swing My Way" (2023)

=== Featured singles ===
- "All the Time" (Jeremih featuring Lil Wayne and Natasha Mosley, 2013)
- "Good Company (Girl's Night)" (Dondria featuring Zonnique and Natasha Mosley, 2023)

== Filmography ==
=== Film ===
Year	Film
2018	Superfly
2019	I Got the Hook-Up 2

=== Television ===
Year	Title	Role
2009	Tiny and Toya	Herself
