= Major (song) =

Single by Young Dolph featuring Key Glock

Single by Young Dolph featuring Key Glock

from the album Role Model
- Released: August 31, 2018
- Length: 3:15
- Label: Paper Route Empire
- Songwriters: Adolph Thornton, Jr.; Markeyvius Cathey; Krishon Gaines
- Producers: BandPlay; Drew Taylor; Corey Cail

Young Dolph singles chronology
"Drippy" (2017)	"Major" (2018)	"By Mistake" (2018)

Key Glock singles chronology
"Orville Redenbacher" (2018)	"Major" (2018)	"Yea!!" (2018)

Music video
- "Major" on YouTube

"Major" is a song by American rapper Young Dolph, released on August 31, 2018 as the lead single from his fourth studio album Role Model (2018). It features American rapper Key Glock and was produced by BandPlay.

== Background ==
In an interview with HotNewHipHop, BandPlay revealed that the song was originally a solo for Key Glock. Both Young Dolph and Glock had recorded a song to a same beat, so BandPlay brought them together.

== Composition ==
The song sees Young Dolph rapping in a flow imitating that of "Rover" by BlocBoy JB about rising from poverty to becoming a wealthy and successful rapper, while Key Glock raps about representing his record label Paper Route Empire in his verse.

== Charts ==
Chart (2018)	Peak position
US Bubbling Under Hot 100 (Billboard)	1
US Hot R&B/Hip-Hop Songs (Billboard)	47

== Certifications ==
Region	Certification	Certified units/sales
United States (RIAA)	3× Platinum	3,000,000^{‡}
^{‡} Sales+streaming figures based on certification alone.
