= Thinking Out Loud (Young Dolph album) =

Studio album by Young Dolph
- Released: October 20, 2017
- Length: 33:47
- Label: Paper Route Empire
- Producers: 30 Roc; Aaron Bow; Buddah Bless; Cassius Jay; DJ Squeeky; Drumma Boy; Eestbound; Honorable C.N.O.T.E.; Mike Will Made It; OZ; Teddy Walton; Zaytoven

Young Dolph chronology
Bulletproof (2017)	Thinking Out Loud (2017)	Niggas Get Shot Everyday (2018)

Thinking Out Loud is the third studio album by American rapper Young Dolph. It was released on October 20, 2017, by Paper Route Empire. It features guest appearances from DRAM, Gucci Mane, 2 Chainz and Ty Dolla Sign. Meanwhile, The album's production is handled by Drumma Boy, Zaytoven, Mike Will Made It, Cassius Jay and Honorable C.N.O.T.E., among others.

== Background ==
Young Dolph was involved in a shooting in which he suffered multiple gunshot wounds. Shortly after his release from the hospital, Young Dolph announced the album's title and release date.

== Singles ==
Three of the album's songs were released as promotional singles. "While U Here" was released as the album's first single on October 16, 2017. While "Believe Me" and "Drippy" were released as the second and third singles on October 18, 2017 and October 19, 2017, respectively.

== Commercial performance ==
Thinking Out Loud debuted at number 16 on the US Billboard 200 dated October 31, 2017, with 23,487 album-equivalent units (including 4,689 pure album sales).

== Track listing ==
No.	Title	Writer(s)	Producer(s)	Length
1.	"What's the Deal"	Adolph Thornton, Jr.; Hayward Ivy	DJ Squeeky	3:39
2.	"Pacific Ocean"	Thornton, Jr.; Travis Walton; Aaron Booe	Teddy Walton; Aaron Bow^{[a]}	3:41
3.	"Point Across"	Thornton, Jr.; Xavier Dotson	Zaytoven	3:13
4.	"Drippy"	Thornton, Jr.; Michael Williams II; Samuel Gloade	Mike Will Made It; 30 Roc^{[a]}	3:24
5.	"Believe Me"	Thornton, Jr.; Joshua Cross	Cassius Jay	3:00
6.	"All of Mine" (featuring DRAM)	Thornton, Jr.; Ozan Yildirim; Bryan Van Mierlo; Shelley Massenburg-Smith	OZ; Eestbound^{[a]}	4:02
7.	"Go Get Sum Mo" (featuring Gucci Mane, 2 Chainz and Ty Dolla Sign)	Thornton, Jr.; Carlton Mays, Jr.; Radric Davis; Tauheed Epps; Tyrone Griffin, Jr.	Honorable C.N.O.T.E.	5:06
8.	"Thinking Out Loud"	Thornton, Jr.; Tyron Douglas	Buddah Bless	3:06
9.	"Eddie Cane"	Thornton, Jr.; Douglas	Buddah Bless	1:58
10.	"While U Here"	Thornton, Jr.; Christopher Gholson	Drumma Boy	2:38
Total length:				33:47

Notes

- ^{^[a]} signifies a co-producer

== Charts ==
Chart (2017)	Peak position
US Billboard 200	16
US Top R&B/Hip-Hop Albums (Billboard)	9
