= Bulletproof (Young Dolph album) =

Studio album by Young Dolph
- Released: April 1, 2017
- Length: 31:26
- Label: Paper Route Empire
- Producers: Buddah Bless; Cassius Jay; DJ Squeeky; Drumma Boy; Dun Deal; Izze the Producer; Metro Boomin; Rasool Diaz; Zaytoven

Young Dolph chronology
Gelato (2017)	Bulletproof (2017)	Thinking Out Loud (2017)

Bulletproof is the second studio album by American rapper Young Dolph, released on April 1, 2017 via Paper Route Empire.

== Background ==
After evading questions about an incident where a reported 100 shots were fired (Dolph was not harmed), Young Dolph delivered his answer to the reports of the Charlotte shooting in the form of a new album, titled Bulletproof.

== Singles ==
"That's How I Feel" was released as the album's first promotional single on March 10, 2017. The song features a guest verse from rapper Gucci Mane, while production was provided by Drumma Boy.

== Track listing ==
No.	Title	Writer(s)	Producer	Length
1.	"100 Shots"	Adolph Thornton; Hayward Ivy	DJ Squeeky	4:24
2.	"In Charlotte"	Thornton; Leland Wayne	Metro Boomin	3:47
3.	"But I'm Bulletproof"	Thornton; Tyron Douglas	Buddah Bless	3:21
4.	"So Fuk'em"	Thornton; Izell Staton	Izze The Producer	2:59
5.	"That's How I Feel" (featuring Gucci Mane)	Thornton; Radric Davis; Christopher Gholson	Drumma Boy	2:35
6.	"All of Them"	Thornton; Xavier Dotson	Zaytoven	2:46
7.	"I'm So Real"	Thornton; David Cunningham; Rasool Diaz	Dun Deal; Rasool Diaz	3:32
8.	"I Pray for My Enemies"	Thornton; Dotson; Joshua Cross	Zaytoven; Cassius Jay	3:00
9.	"I'm Everything You Wanna Be"	Thornton; Dotson	Zaytoven	3:36
10.	"SMH" (acappella song)	Thornton		1:24
Total length:				31:26

Notes

- The tracklist is a sentence about his incident.

== Charts ==
Chart (2017)	Peak position
US Billboard 200	36
US Top R&B/Hip-Hop Albums (Billboard)	19
