= Niggas Get Shot Everyday =

EP by Young Dolph
- Released: February 16, 2018
- Length: 18:34
- Label: Paper Route Empire

Young Dolph chronology
Thinking Out Loud (2017)	Niggas Get Shot Everyday (2018)	Role Model (2018)

Niggas Get Shot Everyday is the third extended play by American rapper Young Dolph; it was released in February 2018 under Paper Route Empire.

== Track listing ==
No.	Title	Length
1.	"Kush on the Yacht"	3:40
2.	"Slave Owner"	2:44
3.	"Flodgin"	3:34
4.	"Paranoid"	3:06
5.	"Playa"	2:44
6.	"Blonde and a Onion"	2:46

== Charts ==
Chart	Peak position
US Billboard 200	59
US Top R&B/Hip-Hop Albums (Billboard)	29
US Top Rap Albums (Billboard)	24
