= King of Memphis (album) =

Studio album by Young Dolph
- Released: February 19, 2016
- Length: 34:43
- Label: Paper Route Empire
- Producer: 30 Roc; Cassius Jay; DJ Squeeky; Drumma Boy; Mike Will Made It; Nard & B; Reazy Renegade; Resource; TM88; XL Eagle; Zaytoven

Young Dolph chronology
Shittin' On The Industry (2015)	King of Memphis (2016)	Rich Crack Baby (2016)

Singles from King of Memphis
- 1. "Get Paid" Released: February 2, 2016

King of Memphis is the debut studio album by American rapper Young Dolph. It was released on February 19, 2016, by Paper Route Empire. The album's production was handled by Mike Will Made It, TM88, Zaytoven, Nard & B, and Drumma Boy, among others. It was supported by one single – "Get Paid".

== Background ==
On February 9, 2016, Young Dolph took to Twitter to announce the album's title along with the cover art and release date. Young Dolph explained the concept behind King of Memphis during an interview with XXL, saying:

"I'm the newest shit, the poppin' shit. The new wave out of Memphis. The CD ain't called The King of Memphis. It's called King of Memphis. So my whole thing is, my last CD was called Shittin' on the Industry. This one called King of Memphis. So I'm just letting everybody know I do what I wanna do with this shit. And on top of that, all my partners kings. Everybody you see around me, they’re kings. Every last one of them. I ain’t the only one that got paper. None of that. I'm the boss."

== Singles ==
The lead single for the album, "Get Paid" was released on February 2, 2016.

== Reception ==
Professional ratings
Aggregate scores
Source	Rating
Metacritic	70/100
Review scores
Source	Rating
AllMusic	3.5/5 stars
HipHopDX	3.3/5
Spin	7/10

King of Memphis received positive reviews from critics. On Metacritic, the album holds a score of 70/100 based on 4 reviews, indicating "generally favorable reviews".

== Track listing ==
King of Memphis
No.	Title	Writer(s)	Producer(s)	Length
1.	"Facts"	Adolph Thornton, Jr.; Michael Williams II; Braylin Bowman	Mike Will Made It; Resource	3:20
2.	"Fuck It"	Thornton, Jr.; Hayward Ivy	DJ Squeeky	3:30
3.	"Royalty"	Thornton, Jr.; Joshua Cross	Cassius Jay	3:15
4.	"Both Ways"	Thornton, Jr.; Christopher Gholson	Drumma Boy	3:24
5.	"How Could"	Thornton, Jr.; Xavier Dotson	Zaytoven	3:27
6.	"USA"	Thornton, Jr.; Dotson; Bryan Simmons	Zaytoven; TM88	2:32
7.	"Let Me See It"	Thornton, Jr.; Williams II; Samuel Gloade	Mike Will Made It; 30 Roc	3:14
8.	"Get Paid"	Thornton, Jr.; Bryan Johnson	Reazy Renegade	3:01
9.	"On My Way"	Thornton, Jr.; James Rosser, Jr.; Brandon Rackley; Trevon Campbell	Nard & B; XL Eagle	3:18
10.	"It's Goin' Down"	Thornton, Jr.; Ivy	DJ Squeeky	2:44
11.	"Real Life"	Thornton, Jr.; Cross	Cassius Jay	2:58
Total length:				34:43
