= C4 (rapper) =

Grime MC from Birmingham, England

Chanda Gerald, known professionally as C4, is a grime MC from Birmingham, England. He's known for his songs "Off Track" and "Crazy Song", both of which were playlisted on BBC Radio 1Xtra.

== Biography ==
C4's real name is Chanda Gerald from which he derived the C in C4. As a boy, C4 sang in his local church choir. His older brother is the garage producer Preditah.

In November 2011, C4 released "OoRITE Time", produced by Preditah. In 2012, he released "Off Track", along with a remix by grime crew Boy Better Know that features JME, Jammer and Frisco. In September 2012, C4 released "Crazy Song", with production by Mike Delinquent. In 2015, C4 released the major tune Go Back featuring JME.

C4 appears frequently on the BBC's digital radio station, 1Xtra.
