= Young Dro =

American rapper

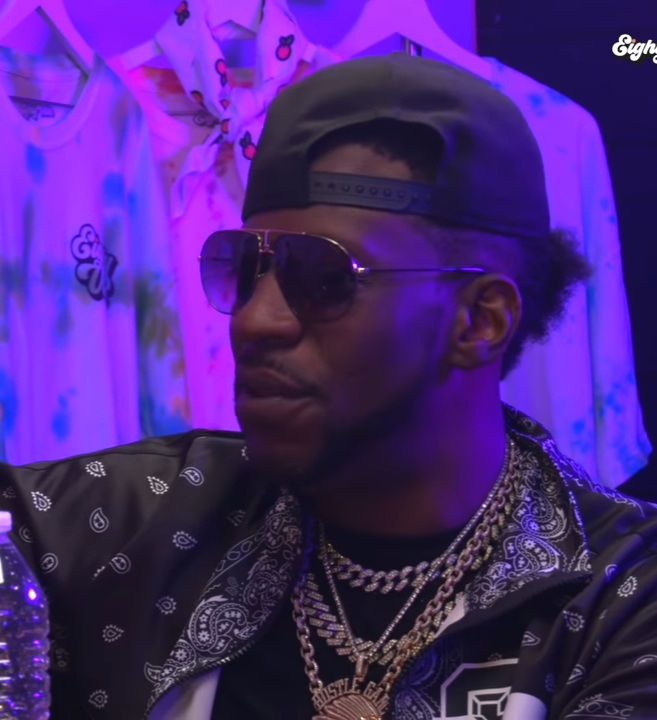
- Young Dro in 2020

Background information
- Also known as: Dro
- Born: D'Juan Montrel Hart; January 15, 1979 (age 47); Atlanta, Georgia, U.S.
- Genres: Southern hip-hop
- Occupations: Rapper; songwriter
- Years active: 1999–present
- Labels: Atlantic (former); Grand Hustle

D'Juan Montrel Hart (born January 15, 1979), better known by his stage name Young Dro, is an American rapper. Best known for his association with fellow Atlanta-based rapper T.I., Dro signed with his label, Grand Hustle, an imprint of Atlantic Records in 2003. His debut studio album, Best Thang Smokin' (2006), peaked at number three on the Billboard 200 and was led by the single "Shoulder Lean" (featuring T.I.), which peaked within the top ten of the Billboard Hot 100. After several mixtapes, his second album, High Times (2013), was released through a joint venture with Grand Hustle and independent distributor Entertainment One Music; its lead single, "FDB", peaked at number two on the Bubbling Under Hot 100 chart.

He has guest appeared on several Billboard Hot 100 entries for other artists, including "Ain't I" by Yung L.A. in 2008, "Nasty" by Bandit Gang Marco in 2014, and "Pricey" by J. Cole and Ari Lennox in 2024.

== Biography ==
=== 1980–2006: Early life and Best Thang Smokin' ===
On January 15, 1979, Young Dro was born D'Juan Hart in Southwest Atlanta, Georgia. He was raised in Bankhead, Atlanta. His inspiration for wanting to rap came from the success of one of his best friends, Chris "Daddy Mack" Smith, one half of Kris Kross. Musically speaking however, Goodie Mob—also west Atlanta natives—had the biggest impact on him. Hart embarked on his professional career around 1999 when he signed to bass music rapper Raheem the Dream's local Atlanta label, Tight 4 Life, under the moniker Dro. He released the regional hit "Yes Sir", and an independent album titled I Got That Dro, around the same time T.I. released his debut, I'm Serious. Although Hart had known T.I. since the early 1990s, they grew apart for some time. In 2004, Young Dro signed a recording contract with T.I.'s label imprint, Grand Hustle. Young Dro released his commercial debut single "Shoulder Lean", in the summer of 2006. The song had heavy rotation on BET and MTV2, and its cellular phone ringtone sold over 500,000 units. The hit single was featured on his major-label debut Best Thang Smokin', released on August 29, 2006. The album debuted at number three on the US Billboard 200 chart.

=== 2007–2013: Mixtapes and High Times ===
In 2007, Dro was included in XXL's first annual Top 10 Freshmen list, featured on their cover alongside fellow American rappers Lupe Fiasco, Lil Boosie, Joell Ortiz, Plies, Saigon, Rich Boy, Gorilla Zoe, Papoose and Crooked I. On March 17, 2009, Hart released a single titled "Take Off", featuring his protege Yung L.A. The song was originally released as the first single from his then-titled second studio album P.O.L.O. (Players Only Live Once). On February 23, 2011, he released a mixtape titled Equestrian Dro. On March 17, 2011, he released a mixtape titled I Co-Sign Myself. On July 8, 2011, he released a mixtape titled Drocabulary. On January 16, 2012, he released a mixtape titled We Outchea. On July 24, 2012, he released a mixtape titled R.I.P. 2 (I Killed That Shit). On September 26, 2012, he released a mixtape titled Ralph Lauren Reefa. On March 28, 2013, the first single from his second studio album "FDB" was released. On June 17, 2013, Young Dro released the mixtape Day Two, in promotion for his second studio album. On July 10, 2013, Young Dro announced he would be releasing his second studio album, titled High Times, in October 2013. On September 18, 2013, the album cover was released and it was announced that the album would be released on October 15, 2013. On September 30, 2013, the track-listing was unveiled, revealing guest appearances on the album from Forgeeauto, Mac Boney, T.I., Spodee, Problem, Natasha Mosley, Blu June, Doe B and Miloh Smith. On September 30, 2013, the second single from High Times, titled "Strong", was released. High Times charted at No. 57 on the Billboard 200 and at No. 9 on the Top Rap Albums chart.

=== 2015–present: Da Reality Show ===
On February 27, 2015, the first single from his third studio album "We in da City" was released. On April 27, 2015, Young Dro announced he would be releasing his third studio album, titled Da Reality Show, in the summer of 2015. It was released on September 18, 2015.

On May 17, 2016, he released a joint mixtape with Zaytoven called "Boot Me Up".

In August 2016, he was arrested at Georgia Southern University for possessing a gun and drugs.

As of May 2019, he was working on a project with upstart gangsta/trap rapper, Romo 11, for Just 11 Records.

As of 2024, he has been featured on "Favorite Trapper" by 1K Phew.

== Discography ==
Studio albums

- I Got That Dro (2001)
- Best Thang Smokin' (2006)
- High Times (2013)
- Da Reality Show (2015)

== Awards and nominations ==
| Award | Category | Year | Result |
|---|---|---|---|
| BET Hip Hop Awards | Element Award: Best Hip Hop Dance Of The Year (Shoulder Lean) | 2006 | Nominated |
| BET Hip Hop Awards | Best Collabo (Shoulder Lean with T.I.) | 2006 | Nominated |
| BET Hip Hop Awards | BET Mobile Hot Ring Award (Shoulder Lean with T.I.) | 2006 | Won |
| The Dirty Awards | Best New Dirty | 2006 | Nominated |
| The Ozone Awards | Best Rapper Award (Georgia) | 2006 | Won |
