= Yung L.A. =

American rapper (born 1986)

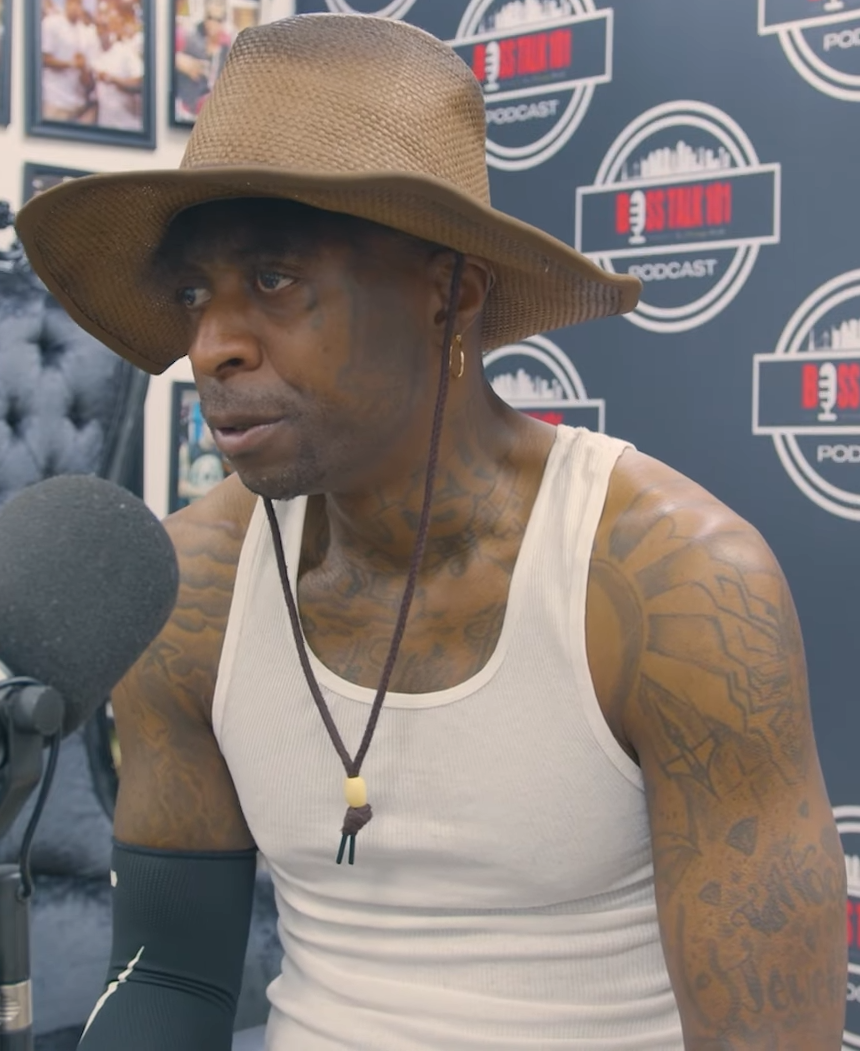
- Yung L.A. in 2025

Background information
- Also known as: Da Boi Lay
- Born: Leland Sandord Austin; March 26, 1986 (age 40); Atlanta, Georgia, U.S.
- Genres: Southern hip-hop
- Occupations: Rapper; songwriter
- Years active: 2006–present
- Labels: Crush Da Block; Zaytown USA; U-Digg; Grand Hustle; Interscope

Leland Sanford Austin (born March 26, 1986), better known by his stage name Yung L.A., is an American rapper. He is perhaps best known for his 2008 single "Ain't I" (featuring Young Dro and T.I.), which peaked at number 47 on the US Billboard Hot 100 chart. Its 2009 follow-up, "Futuristic Love (Elroy)" (featuring Ricco Barrino), entered the Hot R&B/Hip-Hop Songs chart.

== Music career ==
=== 2008–2011: Mixtapes and Futuristic Leland ===
In 2008, Austin was signed to American rapper and record executive T.I.'s Grand Hustle Records, after fellow Atlanta artist Young Dro found and brought Austin to the label. On April 12, 2008, Austin released his debut mixtape Offset Shawty. On November 25, 2008, Austin released his debut single, titled "Ain't I"; it features appearances from his fellow Grand Hustle label artist Young Dro and T.I., it went on to chart on the Billboard Hot 100 at number 47 and be certified platinum by the RIAA. On December 13, 2008, it was announced and confirmed that Austin had signed a label deal with Interscope Records and he was working on his debut album, titled Futuristic Leland. On December 28, 2008, Austin released his mixtape titled The Matrix.

On January 10, 2009, Austin released his first collaboration mixtape titled Black Boy Swag, White Boy Tags with Young Dro. On April 7, 2009, Austin released his second single titled "Futuristic Love (Elroy)"; it features Ricco Barrino, though it did not match the success of "Ain't I" it charted on the Billboard R&B/Hip-Hop chart at number 55. On June 2, 2009, Austin released his mixtape titled Lamborghini Leland. On November 5, 2009, Austin released his mixtape titled I Think I Can Sang. On December 14, 2009, Austin released his second collaboration mixtape, titled Batman & Robin (Superhero Language), with fellow Atlanta artist J Money aka J.Futuristic.

On February 24, 2010, Austin released his mixtape titled Crush Da Block. On February 24, 2010, Austin released his mixtape titled Suntrust Leland.

In early 2011 it was revealed that Austin had parted ways from Grand Hustle and was dropped from Interscope. It was also the shelving of his debut album Futuristic Leland. On September 16, 2011, Austin released his mixtape titled Crush Da Block 2.

=== 2012: Check ===
In a March 27, 2012, interview Austin said he was "dropped from Interscope because my [second] single didn't match the success of the first one". He also said that he wished to leave Grand Hustle Records, that the label had failed him professionally by not following up his hit "Ain't I" with the release of his album, and failed him personally by ignoring him when he was hurt and had asked for their help and by entangling him in disputes that didn't involve him and had begun before he joined the label.

On November 27, 2012, Austin released his debut album titled Check; it was distributed by independent Atlanta based record label U-Digg Music Group.

=== 2014–present: name change, mixtapes and TBA album ===
On November 19, 2014, Austin released his third collaboration mixtape titled Batman & Robin 2 (Superhero Language) with fellow Atlanta artist J Money which is a sequel to their first collaboration mixtape Batman & Robin (Superhero Language).

On February 5, 2015, it was revealed that Yung L.A. was working on a new mixtape titled Expensive Language. On March 27, 2015, Austin released his mixtape Expensive Language. Also on March 27, 2015, during an interview, Austin revealed that he had signed to record producer Zaytoven's label Zaytown USA. On August 7, 2015, Austin released a collaboration mixtape with the production team 808 Mafia titled 3 Way: 80Lay Mafia, and a second collaboration mixtape with producer's Zaytoven and Cassius Jay titled 3 Way: Dripset. Also on August 7, 2015, Austin released a third mixtape titled 3 Way: Foreign Water.

== Controversy ==
In February 2011 Austin had the logo of a local record label tattooed on his face after a conversation with the label's CEO Big Bank Black. Black's brother Alley Boy, the label's co-CEO, demanded that Austin remove the tattoo because he wasn't signed to the label and wasn't given permission to use the logo. Austin countered that Alley Boy lacked the authority to make such a demand because Big Bank Black, not Alley Boy, was "the real CEO" of the label. He did though have a Los Angeles Dodgers logo tattooed over it two weeks later. Austin was assaulted by Alley Boy and members of his label; whether he was beaten before covering the tattoo or after wasn't known.

In April 2011, Austin was arrested for criminal damage to property and released on bail.

== Discography ==
- Check (2012)

== Awards ==
=== BET Awards ===
- 2009
  - Best Collaboration for "Ain't I" (Nominated)
