= Young Dolph =

American rapper (1985–2021)

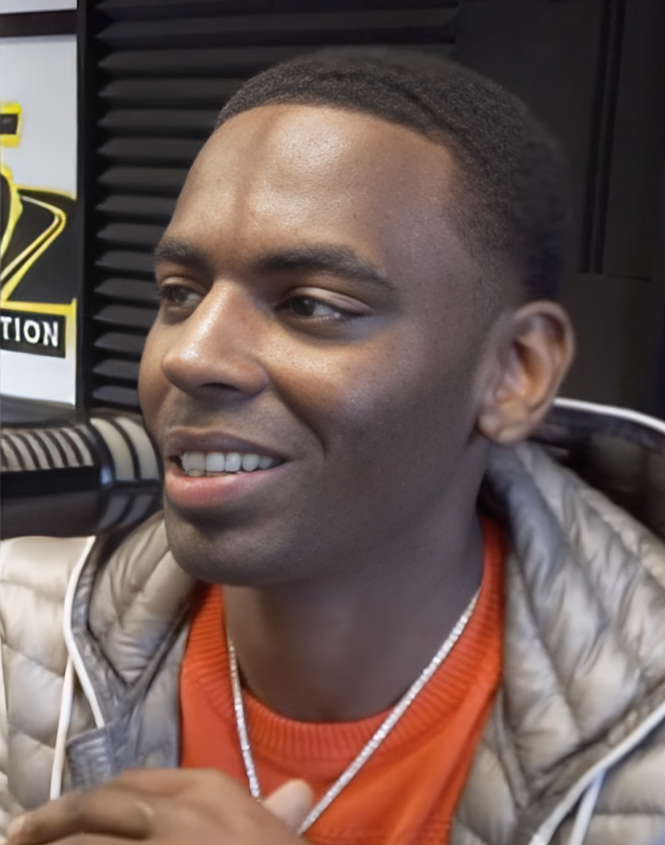
- Dolph in 2017
- Born: Adolph Robert Thornton Jr. July 27, 1985; Chicago, Illinois, U.S.
- Died: November 17, 2021 (aged 36); Memphis, Tennessee, U.S.
- Cause of death: Murder (gunshot wounds)
- Resting place: Calvary Cemetery, Memphis, Tennessee
- Other name: Flippa
- Education: Hamilton High School
- Occupations: Rapper; songwriter; record executive
- Years active: 2008–2021
- Partner: Mia Jaye (2012–2021; his death)
- Children: 2
- Relatives: Key Glock (cousin-in-law); Juice Wrld (second cousin)
- Musical career
- Origin: Memphis, Tennessee, U.S.
- Genres: Southern hip hop; trap; Memphis rap; gangsta rap
- Labels: Paper Route Empire; Empire
- Website: youngdolph.com

Adolph Robert Thornton Jr. (July 27, 1985 – November 17, 2021), known professionally as Young Dolph, was an American rapper, songwriter, and record executive. He first garnered mainstream attention for his guest appearance on O.T. Genasis' 2015 single "Cut It", which peaked within the top 40 of the Billboard Hot 100. The following year, he released his debut studio album King of Memphis, which peaked at number 49 on the Billboard 200. His fifth album, Rich Slave (2020), peaked at number four on the chart.

Thornton founded the independent label Paper Route Empire in 2010, through which he signed his cousin in-law, fellow Memphis-based rapper Key Glock. On November 17, 2021, Dolph was murdered in his hometown of Memphis, Tennessee.

== Early life ==
Adolph Robert Thornton Jr. was born on July 27, 1985, in Chicago, Illinois. When he was two years old, his family moved to Memphis, Tennessee. He had two sisters and two brothers; he and late Chicago rapper Juice Wrld were second cousins. Thornton was mostly raised by his grandmother, Ida Mae; his parents experienced addictions to crack cocaine, and as a child, he would only see them every few weeks.

Thornton said that the community he was from in South Memphis, many of his peers were raised by their grandmothers due to the issues experienced by their parents. He described initially recognizing his grandmother as "the meanest motherfucker in the world", explaining "I didn't get that shit at the time. ... All the shit she was telling you, you get to seeing that shit when you hit about 15", saying that when he approached that age he began utilizing her teachings throughout his life to be more independent. As a teenager, Thornton attended Hamilton High School, being a barber on the side from the ages of 12 to 15. From the ages of 16 to 17 and onward, he turned to the streets for a means of income. He recollected about the only time his grandmother caught him, saying "Grandma [was] right there, [I'm] trying to stuff all this shit in my pants, but I got on shorts...she just start [sic] yelling and screaming. She the only person I cared about, what she say, what she think about me..."

His grandmother often prohibited Thornton to have friends visit their home, but on occasion let homeless friends stay with the family. On March 5, 2008, Thornton's grandmother died of lung cancer after a long illness.

== Career ==
=== 2008–2014: Career beginnings and early successes ===
In 2008, due to encouragement from his friends, Young Dolph released his first mixtape Paper Route Campaign. Seeing its local popularity, he decided to fully invest himself into rap. Two years later, he formally established his label Paper Route Empire in 2010, an independent record label inspired by the likes of Master P and Baby, and subsequently released his first mainstream mixtape Welcome 2 Dolph World that same year, hosted by Atlanta DJ DJ Scream with features from 8Ball & MJG, 2 Chainz (then known as Tity Boi), and in-house artists Tim Gates and Money Makkin Murda. With the release of mixtapes High Class Street Music and High Class Street Music 2 in 2011, Young Dolph began to develop his own rap flow, shifting away from a style similar to Memphis rappers Three 6 Mafia and 8Ball & MJG instead to a personal style described as "vociferous" with a "magnetic delivery and uniquely deep voice". In 2012, Young Dolph released the mixtapes A Time 2 Kill and Blue Magic on April 12 and November 14, respectively. The former's title was inspired by the movie of the same name, and the latter's title inspired by the movie American Gangster. Following multiple collaborations along with a personal connection with Atlanta trap rapper Gucci Mane, Young Dolph released the collaboration mixtape EastAtlantaMemphis on March 15, 2013, with features from Young Scooter and Big Bank Black. On May 13, 2013, he released the third installment of the High Class Street Music series, Trappin' Out a Mansion. On October 15, 2013, Young Dolph released South Memphis Kingpin, with the song "South Memphis" achieving high popularity. On April 15, 2014, Dolph released Cross Country Trappin. On July 8, 2014, Young Dolph released the fourth installment of the High Class Street Music series, American Gangster. This mixtape included the song "Preach", which received nationwide fame, as well as features from Gucci Mane, 2 Chainz, Fiend, Trinidad James, Shy Glizzy, Trae tha Truth, Problem, and Cap 1.

=== 2014–2017: Debut album and feud with Yo Gotti ===
On February 24, 2015, Young Dolph released the fifth and final installment of the High Class Street Music series, The Plug Best Friend. It included features from 2 Chainz, Shy Glizzy, and Peewee Longway, as well as a remix of "Preach" featuring Rick Ross and Jeezy. On June 30, Dolph released a collaboration album with Gucci Mane and Peewee Longway titled Felix Brothers. On July 28, 2015, Dolph released mixtape 16 Zips with features from T.I., Slim Thug, Paul Wall, Jadakiss, and fellow Paper Route artist Jay Fizzle. In September 2015, Young Dolph was featured on O.T. Genasis's double platinum hit single "Cut It". On October 8, 2015, Young Dolph released Shittin on the Industry, an 11-song mixtape including the hit single "Get Paid".

In February 2016, he released his debut album King of Memphis under his independent Paper Route Empire label, which peaked at number 49 on the Billboard 200. Other Memphis rappers (including Yo Gotti and Gotti-affiliated Blac Youngsta) took offense at the album title, with Blac Youngsta leading an armed group attempting to find Young Dolph in Memphis and releasing a diss track, "SHAKE SUM (Young Dolph Diss)" in response.

In 2017, Young Dolph released a diss track against Yo Gotti titled "Play Wit Yo' Bitch", prompting Yo Gotti to release a response song. Two weeks later, in February 2017, Young Dolph released a music video for "Play Wit Yo' Bitch". The next day, his vehicle was the target of gunfire in Charlotte, North Carolina, while in town for a performance at the Central Intercollegiate Athletic Association tournament. His car was reportedly shot over 100 times but was outfitted with bulletproof panels, and no one was hurt. He performed the same night.

Following the shooting, Blac Youngsta and two other men were arrested, but the charges were later dropped due to insufficient evidence. Young Dolph used the publicity from the shooting to promote his second studio album Bulletproof. In September 2017, he was shot multiple times. In February 2018, he released the extended play Niggas Get Shot Everyday, referencing this prior incident.

=== 2017–2020: Charting singles and first top 10 album ===
In 2017, Young Dolph signed his cousin-by-marriage and fellow Memphis rapper Key Glock to his Paper Route Empire label, after the two had met at family gatherings. In 2018, they released the single "Major", which peaked at number 47 on the Hot R&B/Hip-Hop Songs chart. That same year, Young Dolph said that he had been offered a $22 million label deal which he turned down. Preferring to stay on his own independent label, Young Dolph stated, "It really was a good deal, a super good deal to tell you the truth. But it's just, I see something else".

Young Dolph later revealed that he signed a distribution deal with Empire Distribution, and his September 2018 album Role Model was released under the label Paper Route Empire, a joint venture between Paper Route Empire and Empire Distribution. In July 2019, Young Dolph again collaborated with Key Glock, this time releasing his first collaborative album entitled Dum and Dummer, imitating the title of the Farrelly brothers' film Dumb and Dumber.

The album peaked at number eight on the Billboard 200, earning each of the artists their first top 10 album. The album was produced by BandPlay, who used a variety of styles of beats in the album's tracks. Reviewers for the album noted Young Dolph's greater "songwriting range", with "depths of self-loathing and despair" that were complemented by the younger Key Glock's "celebrations of himself".

=== 2020–2021: Retirement plans and top 10 solo album ===
Rumors emerged in early 2020 that Young Dolph was considering his retirement from music in order to spend more time with his children, and was seen more frequently in Memphis. On his Instagram, Young Dolph wrote, "Highly considering quitting the music business because I really wanna be with my kids 24/7". During the COVID-19 pandemic in the United States, Young Dolph released the single "Sunshine" and released edited album covers of previous releases on streaming services to feature individuals wearing surgical masks to highlight and address the global situation.

In an interview with GQ in May 2020, he was asked about his recent release of music, with Young Dolph replying "Man, my little boy wanted to hear some new music. ... I'll keep it real: I ain't really been on my rapper shit, I been on my industry shit, the big bro shit. I got a lot of artists, and I been dropping all my artists' projects, and they going up. ... So I'm like, 'Yeah, I gotta go ahead and give it to them.' I gotta drop it."

Young Dolph's fifth solo album, Rich Slave, was released on August 14, 2020. It was preceded by the singles "Blue Diamonds", "RNB" featuring Megan Thee Stallion and "Death Row". Young Dolph explained the album's title, stating "It's the reality of being Black in this country". Rich Slave was Young Dolph's highest-charting album, peaking at 4th on the Billboard 200.

On March 5, 2021, Young Dolph and Key Glock released the single "Aspen", and subsequently their second collaborative album, Dum and Dummer 2, was released on March 26, 2021. It is a sequel to 2019's Dum and Dummer, and combined solo songs with tracks featuring both artists. The project's cartoon artwork references Beavis and Butt-Head. The album was released by Young Dolph's independent Paper Route Empire label. In a review on Pitchfork, Nadine Smith gave the album a 7.5/10 rating, stating that "Dolph & Glock fashion themselves in the image of pop culture dunces even if at the same time they're poised, extravagant, and immaculate—there's a casualness to their rapport and respective flows that never announces itself too much."

=== Posthumous releases ===
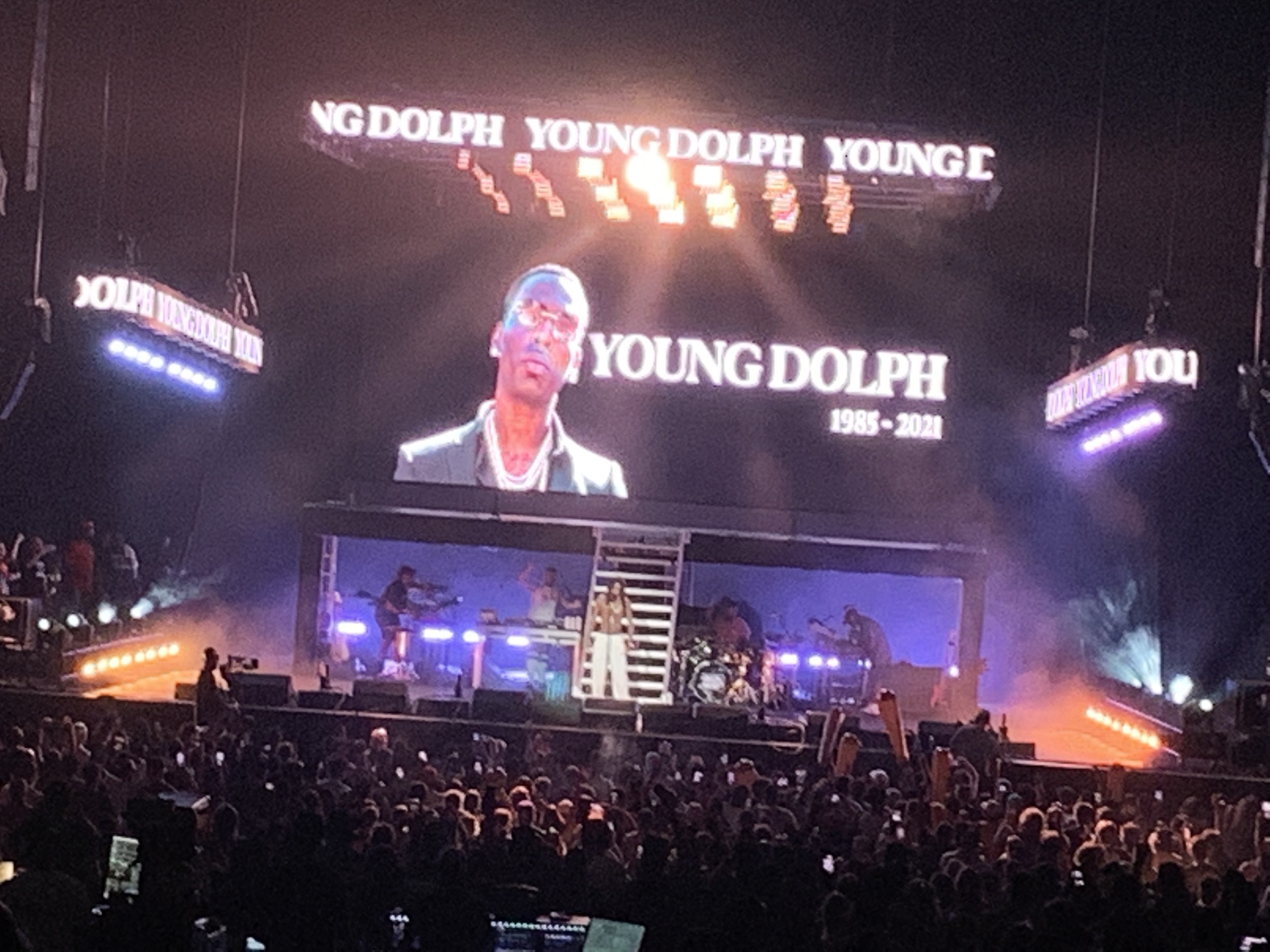
Memorial billboard for Young Dolph

A posthumous tribute album titled Long Live Young Dolph was announced on January 10, 2022, and was officially released on January 21, 2022, through Paper Route Empire. It was preceded by the release of the single "LLD (Long Live Dolph)". The compilation album contains guest appearances from PRE associates: Key Glock, Big Moochie Grape, Kenny Muney, Jay Fizzle, Joddy Badass, Snupe Bandz, Paper Route Woo and Chitana.

A posthumous album from Dolph, titled Paper Route Frank, was released on December 16, 2022.

== Personal life ==
Thornton had two children with Mia Jaye. He said that he was somewhat strict with his parenting due to his upbringing with his grandmother. Thornton often collaborated with his cousin and fellow rapper Key Glock and was a distant relative of rapper Juice Wrld, learning of the familial relation with the latter in 2017.

Thornton was shot outside a retail store in Hollywood, Los Angeles, on September 26, 2017. He was listed in critical condition at the hospital, but within a few hours doctors reported he was expected to survive. He spent two weeks in the hospital recovering from three gunshot wounds. Yo Gotti was initially named a person of interest moments after the shooting but was later cleared. Yo Gotti's friend, Corey McClendon, was arrested for attempted murder, only to be released the next day with no charges.

During the COVID-19 pandemic in 2020, Thornton began to stay with his family in Memphis more frequently and did so amid rumors of retirement. He was known in the area for his philanthropy, donating $25,000 to his alma mater, Hamilton High School, and providing motivational speeches to students. Known for handing out Thanksgiving dinners, Thornton gave away two hundred turkeys to individuals at the West Cancer Center days before his death and was scheduled to donate additional meals days later.

== Death and murder trial ==
Murder of Young Dolph
- Location: Memphis, Tennessee, U.S.
- Date: November 17, 2021; 5 years ago 12:22 p.m. (CST)
- Attack type: Homicide by shooting
- Victims: Adolph Robert Thornton Jr., a.k.a. Young Dolph
- Motive: Rap feud
- Accused: Hernandez Govan; Cornelius Smith; Shundale Barnett
- Charges: Smith and Govan: First-degree murder; Criminal attempt to commit first-degree murder; Smith: Unlawful carrying or possession of a weapon; Employing a firearm during a felony; Grand theft; Govan: Conspiracy to commit first-degree murder; Barnett: After-the-fact accessory
- Verdict: Jemarcus Johnson: Pleaded guilty Justin Johnson: Guilty on all counts Hernandez Govan: Not guilty on all counts Cornelius Smith: Pleaded guilty to one count of second-degree murder (not included in original charges)
- Convictions: Jemarcus Johnson: After-the-fact accessory (3 counts) (Note: Jemarcus Johnson's charge of conspiracy to murder was dropped in a plea deal.); Justin Johnson: First-degree murder; Conspiracy to commit first-degree murder; Unlawful carrying or possession of a weapon; Cornelius Smith: Second-degree murder (Note: All of Cornelius Smith's numerous charges which he initially received, and which were mostly related to first-degree murder allegations, were dropped in a plea deal)
- Sentence: Jemarcus Johnson: Six years probation with annual 20 hours of community service, with charges against Jemarcus Johnson eventually being dismissed upon completion of both sentence and diversion program. Justin Johnson: Life imprisonment with the possibility of parole after 63 1/4 years Cornelius Smith: 20 years in prison.
- Convicted: Jemarcus Johnson; Justin Johnson; Cornelius Smith

On November 17, 2021, Thornton was shot dead in Memphis while visiting Makeda's Homemade Butter Cookies, a bakery he frequently visited whenever he was back home. After insisting on not having his bodyguards present (Exclusive Security Group), two gunmen in a white two-door Mercedes-Benz gunned him down. An autopsy revealed that Thornton had 22 gunshot wounds from bullet entries and exits. Some wounds were sustained in the forehead and back. Crowds of hundreds of people swarmed the scene of Thornton's death for hours; police had to prevent individuals from entering the area while they investigated. Tennessee House Representative London Lamar and Memphis councilman J. B. Smiley reacted by calling for a curfew in Memphis to prevent civil unrest and violence.

Thornton was buried on November 30, 2021. A private funeral service was held at First Baptist Church on Broad Street, where a public memorial later was held at the FedEx Forum, on December 15th, 2021. After the funeral service, the family's caravan of black SUVs was escorted by security and Memphis Police to the Calvary Cemetery, across from Hamilton High School, Young Dolph's alma mater.

On January 5, 2022, police identified one of the suspects responsible for the murder as 23-year-old Justin Johnson, and issued a first-degree murder warrant. A reward of up to $15,000 for information on the suspect was offered by the Tennessee authorities. Johnson had an established history of criminal charges and violence, as well as "ties to organized criminal gangs", and was a rapper under the name Straight Drop.

Another suspect, 32-year-old Cornelius Smith (who was arrested for the theft of the car used in Dolph's murder), was indicted on first-degree murder, weapons possession, and theft charges on January 11. The same day, Johnson was captured by police in Indiana after law enforcement received over 500 tips leading to his arrest. A passenger, 27-year-old Shundale Barnett, of the vehicle Johnson was driving was also arrested. On January 12, Johnson and Smith were indicted on first-degree murder and other criminal charges, while Barnett was charged with being an "after-the-fact accessory".

After Johnson and Smith struggled to find legal representation, they were given an ultimatum by Judge Lee Coffee: "If you have a lawyer hired, that's fine, but as I told you 10 days ago, I cannot allow you to sit in jail week after week, month after month, without a lawyer. ... If you don't have a lawyer hired on [February 4], I'm going to hire a private attorney to represent both of you all." On February 7, Johnson appeared in court again for "violating a sex offender registration charge" after reportedly being convicted of aggravated rape in 2015. He also claimed he was unable to afford to hire an attorney. On February 11, both Johnson and Smith pleaded not guilty to first-degree murder. On November 10, 2022, a third suspect was indicted for the murder of Young Dolph and the conspiracy to murder Thornton, 43-year-old Hernandez Govan, who is alleged to have ordered the murder of Young Dolph at the behest of Yo Gotti's brother, Anthony "Big Jook" Mims.

In June 2023, Jemarcus Johnson reached a plea deal where he pleaded guilty to three counts of accessory after-the-fact in exchange for his conspiracy to murder charge dropped. He was expected to testify against the other suspects at their upcoming trials. In November 2024, Jemarcus would receive a sentence six years of probation and 20 hours of annual community service, with his sentence including a diversion condition which will result in the charges against him being eventually dismissed upon completion of sentence if he complies with diversionary program.

As of June 2024, the trial for Justin Johnson and Cornelius Smith was scheduled for September 2024. Jemarcus Johnson was set to be sentenced for accessory to murder after testifying against Johnson and Smith at their trials. On September 23, Smith acknowledged during court testimony that he and Johnson were the ones who shot Thornton after being promised a $40,000 payout from Govan and Yo Gotti's brother, Anthony "Big Jook" Mims. Govan himself was to receive $20,000 total from Smith and Justin Johnson.

Mims himself was murdered in January 2024 without ever being charged for Thornton's murder.

On September 26, 2024, Justin Johnson was found guilty on all counts and was sentenced to life in prison for the murder charge. Despite admitting in testimony that he killed Thornton, Smith still faced trial. On October 9, 2024, Govan's trial date was set for March 10, 2025, but was pushed back to July 28 after scheduling conflicts. He was acquitted on all charges on August 21, 2025. On May 15, 2026, Cornelius Smith became the final defendant in the Young Dolph murder to be convicted and sentenced after he accepted a plea deal where he pled guilty to second degree murder then immediately received a 20-year prison sentence.

== Legacy ==
The city of Memphis approved street-renaming for a street in the honor of Thornton. The street was changed to Adolph "Young Dolph" Thornton Jr. Avenue, which is located on the intersection of Dunn Avenue and Airways Boulevard, just east of Castalia Heights (where Dolph was raised) and not far from where Dolph was killed.

In February 2022, two Tennessee lawmakers (Representative Torrey C. Harris and former Senator Katrina Robinson) proposed a bill which would make November 17 – the day on which Dolph was killed – the "Adolph Thornton Day of Service". The bill listed several of Dolph's acts of philanthropy and described him as "an exemplary gentleman and consummate professional who worked assiduously to improve the quality of life for his fellow citizens in numerous capacities". It also stated the holiday's goal is to "celebrate the memory, music, and community service contributions of [Dolph] and to encourage Tennesseans to help others."

== Discography ==
Studio albums

- King of Memphis (2016)
- Bulletproof (2017)
- Thinking Out Loud (2017)
- Role Model (2018)
- Rich Slave (2020)
- Paper Route Frank (2022)

EP

- Bossed Up (2016)
- Tracking Numbers (with Berner) (2017)
- Niggas Get Shot Everyday (2018)

== See also ==
- List of murdered hip hop musicians
