= BadBadNotGood discography =

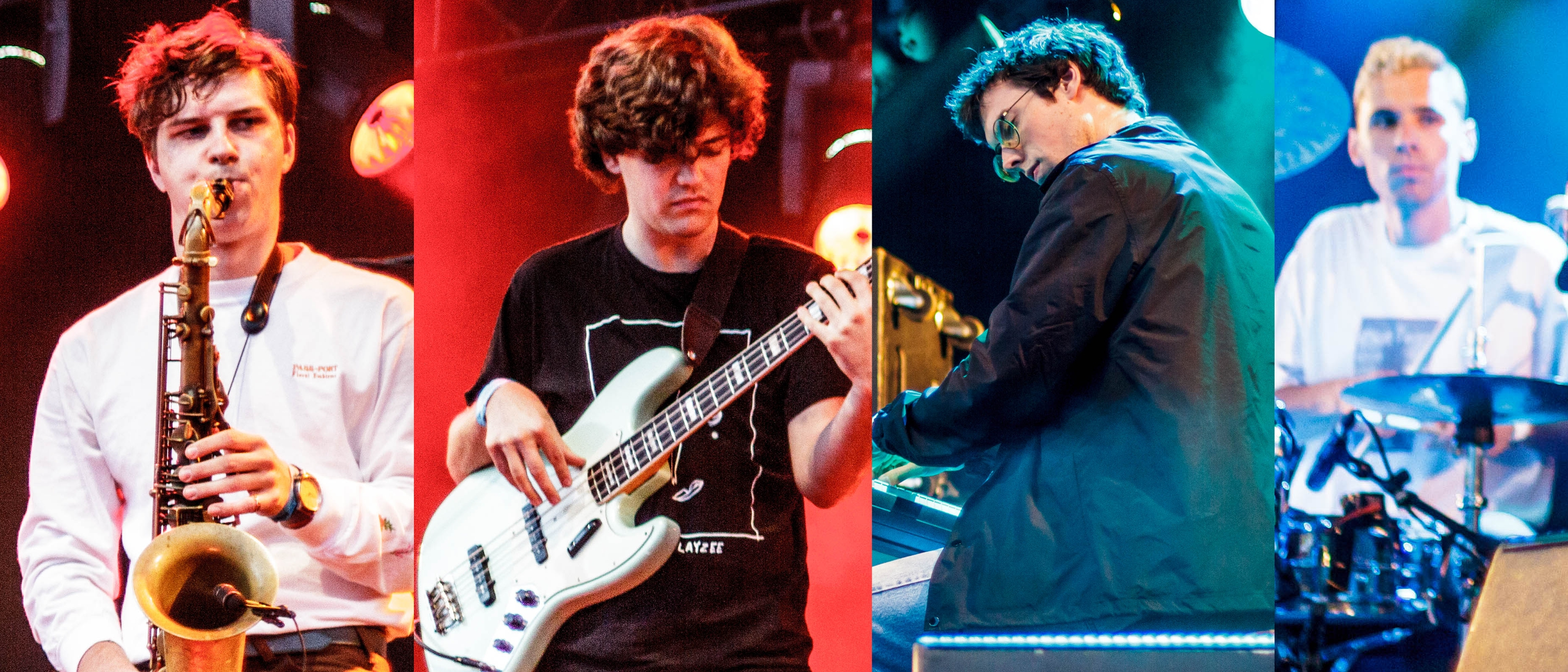
- BadBadNotGood performing in Germany 2017.
- Studio albums: 5
- Live albums: 3
- Collaborative albums: 4
- DJ mixes: 2

The discography of BadBadNotGood, the Canadian instrumental jazz and hip-hop group, includes five solo studio albums as well as collaborative projects like 2015's Sour Soul with Ghostface Killah, and numerous singles. Collaborative since their origin, BBNG is well known for working with artists like Daniel Caesar, MF Doom, Kali Uchis, and Mick Jenkins. Outside of their own output, BBNG are noted producers and songwriters and often work with fellow Canadian producers Frank Dukes and Kaytranada.

== Albums ==
=== Studio albums ===
| Title | Details | Peak chart positions | | | | | | | | | | |
| Title | Details | CAN | AUS | BEL (FL) | UK | US | US Taste | US Heat. | US Indie | US Jazz | US Contemp Jazz | US Dance/Elec. |
|---|---|---|---|---|---|---|---|---|---|---|---|---|
| BBNG | Released: September 17, 2011; Label: Self-released; Format: digital | — | — | — | — | — | — | — | — | — | — | — |
| BBNG2 | Released: April 3, 2012; Label: Self-released, Innovative Leisure (LP reissue); Format: LP, digital | — | — | — | — | — | — | — | — | — | — | — |
| III | Released: May 6, 2014; Label: Innovative Leisure, Pirates Blend, Arts & Crafts; Format: LP, CD, cassette, digital | — | — | — | — | — | — | 10 | — | 2 | 1 | 10 |
| IV | Released: July 8, 2016; Label: Innovative Leisure, Arts & Crafts; Format: LP, CD, cassette, digital | 89 | 54 | 48 | 100 | 178 | 9 | 3 | 10 | 1 | 1 | — |
| Talk Memory | Released: October 8, 2021; Label: XL, Innovative Leisure; Format: LP, CD, cassette, digital | — | — | 38 | — | — | 5 | 4 | — | 3 | 1 | — |
| Mid Spiral | Released: October 25, 2024; Label: XL, Innovative Leisure; Format: LP, CD, digital | — | — | — | — | — | 19 | — | — | 16 | 3 | — |

=== Collaborative albums ===
| Title | Details | Peak chart positions | | | | | | | |
| Title | Details | AUS | AUS Hits | AUS Urban | BEL (FL) | US | US Taste | US R&B/HH | US Rap |
|---|---|---|---|---|---|---|---|---|---|
| Sour Soul (with Ghostface Killah) | Released: February 24, 2015; Label: Lex Records; Format: LP, CD, cassette, digital; Released with instrumental version | 54 | 1 | 5 | 196 | 109 | 12 | 9 | 6 |
| Toon Time Raw! (Jerry Paper and Easy Feelings Unlimited) | Released: June 17, 2016; Label: Bayonet Records; Format: LP, CD, digital; Credited under alias | — | — | — | — | — | — | — | — |
| New Heart Designs EP (with Turnstile) | Released: August 11, 2023; Label: Roadrunner Records; Format: Digital; Reinterpretation of Glow On | — | — | — | — | — | — | — | — |
| Slow Burn EP (with Baby Rose) | Released: April 12, 2024; Label: Secretly Canadian; Format: LP, digital | — | — | — | — | — | — | — | — |

=== Live albums ===
- BBNGLive 1 (self-released, 2011)
- BBNGLive 2 (self-released, 2012)
- Spotify Live EP (Innovative Leisure, 2017)

=== Mixtapes ===
- BadBadNotGood (self-released, June 2011)

=== DJ mixes ===
- Lex Mix: BadBadNotGood Doom Mix (Lex Records, 2013)
- LateNightTales: BadBadNotGood (LateNightTales, 2017)

== Singles ==
=== As lead artist ===
| Title (A-side/B-side) | Year | Peak chart positions | Album | Ref. |
| Title (A-side/B-side) | Year | US Emerging | Album | Ref. |
|---|---|---|---|---|
| "Rotten Decay" "Hard in da Paint/Wow Rare" (Note: Packaged as BBNGSingle.) | 2011 | — | Non-album singles | |
| "Doom" (MF Doom cover medley) | 2011 | — | Non-album singles | |
| "Fall in Love" (Slum Village cover) | 2011 | — | BBNG | |
| "Flashing Lights" (Kanye West cover) "UWM" | 2013 | — | BBNG2 | |
| "Hedron" | 2013 | — | III | |
| "Can't Leave the Night" "Sustain" | 2014 | — | III | |
| "CS60" | 2014 | — | III | |
| "Now or Never" (with Black Milk) | 2014 | — | Non-album single | |
| "Six Degrees" (with Ghostface Killah featuring Danny Brown) "Tone's Rap" (with Ghostface Killah) | 2014 | 46 (Note: "Tone's Rap" peaked at number 46.) | Sour Soul | |
| "Velvet" "Boogie No. 69" | 2015 | 21 (Note: "Velvet" charted at number 21.) | Non-album singles | |
| "Here & Now" "Timewave Zero" | 2016 | — | Non-album singles | |
| "Speaking Gently" | 2016 | — | IV | |
| "Time Moves Slow" (featuring Samuel T. Herring) | 2016 | — | IV | |
| "Confessions Pt. II" | 2016 | — | IV | |
| "Lavender" (Note: Later included on split single with Snoop Dogg.) (featuring Kaytranada) | 2016 | — | IV | |
| "In Your Eyes" (featuring Charlotte Day Wilson) | 2016 | — | IV | |
| "In Your Eyes [Nosaj Thing Remix]" (featuring Charlotte Day Wilson) | 2017 | — | IV | |
| "To You" (Andy Shauf cover) | 2017 | — | LateNightTales | |
| "Confessions, Pt. III" (featuring Colin Stetson) | 2017 | — | Non-album singles | |
| "I Don't Know" (with Samuel T. Herring) | 2017 | — | Non-album singles | |
| "Tried" (with Little Dragon) | 2018 | — | Non-album singles | |
| "Key to Love (Is Understanding)" (Note: Split single with Majestics.) (with Jonah Yano) | 2019 | — | Non-album singles | |
| "Goodbye Blue" (with Jonah Yano) "Glide (Goodbye Blue Pt. 2)" | 2020 | — | Non-album singles | |
| "The Chocolate Conquistadors" (Johnny Hammond cover) (Note: Produced for the in-game WorldWide FM radio station in Grand Theft Auto Online: The Cayo Perico Heist.) (with MF Doom) "The Chocolate Conquistadors (Instrumental)" | 2020 | — | Non-album singles | |
| "Signal from the Noise" | 2021 | — | Talk Memory | |
| "Beside April" | 2021 | — | Talk Memory | |
| "Open Channels" | 2022 | — | Talk Memory | |
| "Unfolding (Momentum 73)" [Ron Trent Remix] | 2022 | — | Talk Memory | |
| "Love Proceeding" [Macroblank Remix] | 2022 | — | Talk Memory | |
| "Sleeper" (with Charlotte Day Wilson) | 2023 | — | Non-album single | |
| "Take What's Given" | 2024 | — | Non-album single | |
| "One Last Dance" (with Baby Rose) | 2024 | — | Slow Burn | |

=== Split singles ===
Adapted from Jaxsta.

List of split singles, with details and track listings
| Title | Details | Track listing | Album |
|---|---|---|---|
| Lavender (Nightfall Remix) (with Snoop Dogg) | Released: June 9, 2017; Label: Innovative Leisure; Format: LP, digital | "Lavender (Nightfall Remix)" (Snoop Dogg featuring Kaytranada and BadBadNotGood) | Neva Left IV |
| Lavender (Nightfall Remix) (with Snoop Dogg) | Released: June 9, 2017; Label: Innovative Leisure; Format: LP, digital | "Lavender" (BadBadNotGood featuring Kaytranada) | Neva Left IV |
| Lavender (Nightfall Remix) (with Snoop Dogg) | Released: June 9, 2017; Label: Innovative Leisure; Format: LP, digital | "Lavender (Nightfall Acappella)" (Snoop Dogg) | Neva Left IV |
| Key to Love (Is Understanding) (with Majestics) | Released: May 15, 2019; Label: Light in the Attic; Format: 7", digital; Exclusive for Light in the Attic Cover Series | "Key to Love (Is Understanding)" (Majestics cover) (featuring Jonah Yano) | Non-album single Class A / Key to Love |
| Key to Love (Is Understanding) (with Majestics) | Released: May 15, 2019; Label: Light in the Attic; Format: 7", digital; Exclusive for Light in the Attic Cover Series | "Key to Love (Is Understanding)" (Majestics) | Non-album single Class A / Key to Love |

=== As featured artist ===
Adapted from Jaxsta.

List of commercial singles as featured artist, with chart positions
| Title | Year | Peak chart positions | | | Album |
| Title | Year | US Emerging | US Jazz Digital | US R&B | Album |
|---|---|---|---|---|---|
| "Seasons (Waiting on You)" (BadBadNotGood Reinterpretation) (Future Islands, original artist; BBNG, remix artist) | 2014 | — | — | — | Non-album single |
| "Drowning" (Mick Jenkins featuring BadBadNotGood) | 2016 | — | — | — | The Healing Component |
| "Lavender (Nightfall Remix)" (Snoop Dogg feat. BadBadNotGood and Kaytranada) | 2017 | 4 | 2 | — | Neva Left Lavender (Nightfall Remix) |
| "Ultimate (BBNG Sessions)" / "Sick and Tired (BBNG Sessions)" (Denzel Curry featuring BadBadNotGood) | 2017 | — | — | — | Non-album single |
| "Nervous" (Jonah Yano and BadBadNotGood) | 2019 | — | — | — | Nervous EP |
| "Qadir" (BadBadNotGood Remix) (Nick Hakim, original artist; BBNG, remix artist) | 2021 | — | — | — | Will This Make Me Good (The Remixes) |
| "Running Away" (VANO 3000 with BBNG and Samuel T. Herring) | 2021 | — | — | — | Non-album single |
| "Tomorrow - BadBadNotGood Remix" (Note: "Tomorrow" remix was released as the B-side of "Presence" remix, released as on July 23, 2021 ahead of the album.) (Brittany Howard, original artist; BBNG, remix artist) | 2021 | — | — | — | Jaime (Reimagined) |
| "Break of Dawn" (Skiifall feat. BadBadNotGood) | 2021 | — | — | — | Non-album single |
| "Please Do Not Lean" (Daniel Caesar feat. BadBadNotGood) | 2022 | — | — | 20 | TBA |
| "To the Floor" (Lil Silva feat. BadBadNotGood) | 2022 | — | — | — | Yesterday is Heavy |
| "The Ordinary Is Ordinary Because It Ordinarily Repeats" (Jonah Yano with BadBadNotGood) | 2023 | — | — | — | The Ordinary Is Ordinary Because It Ordinarily Repeats |
| "Marking My Time (BBNG Edit)" (Elmiene with BadBadNotGood) | 2023 | — | — | — | Non-album single |
| "Mint Chocolate" (BadBadNotGood with Westside Gunn; featuring Conway the Machine) | 2023 | — | — | — | Hella |

=== Other charting songs ===
| Title | Year | Peak chart positions | Album |
| Title | Year | US Emerging | Album |
|---|---|---|---|
| "Gunshowers" (with Ghostface Killah featuring eLZhi) | 2014 | 12 | Sour Soul |
| "Kaleidoscope" | 2014 | 39 | III |
| "Ray Gun" (with Ghostface Killah featuring Doom) | 2015 | 7 | Sour Soul |
| "On the Map" (with Mick Jenkins) | 2017 | 7 | Non-album single (Note: Unofficial single.) |

== Guest appearances ==
Adapted from Jaxsta.

List of non-single tracks as credited featured artist
| Title | Year | Other artist(s) | Album |
|---|---|---|---|
| "Paradise" | 2015 | Daniel Caesar, Sean Leon | Pilgrims's Paradise |
| "Weight Off" | 2016 | Kaytranada | 99.9% |
| "All Alone" | 2016 | Stwo, Shay Lia | D.T.S.N.T. EP |
| "Our Conversations" | 2016 | Little Simz | Stillness in Wonderland |
| "Lavender (Nightfall Remix)" | 2017 | Snoop Dogg, Kaytranada | Neva Left Lavender (Nightfall Remix) |
| "Smoking Song" | 2018 | Mick Jenkins | Pieces of a Man |
| "I Can Only Whisper" | 2021 | Charlotte Day Wilson | Alpha |

== Remixes and covers ==
Much of the early hype around the band focused on their cover versions of popular hip hip and electronica songs which populated their first two studio albums and live records, released in 2011 and 2012. Since that time, the group has produced official covers/remixes (sometimes billed as 'reinterpretations') for other artists across genres and have occasionally released covers as bonus tracks or singles for special projects.

=== Official remixes ===
List of official remixes, with original artist and album
| Title | Year | Original artist | Album | Notes |
|---|---|---|---|---|
| "Guv'nor" (BadBadNotGood Version) | 2013 | MF Doom & Jneiro Jarel | Keys to the Kuffs (Butter Edition) Bookhead EP | |
| "Shame" (BadBadNotGood Remix) | 2014 | Freddie Gibbs & Madlib | III | Rappcats exclusive bonus track |
| "Seasons (Waiting on You)" (BadBadNotGood Reinterpretation) | 2014 | Future Islands | Non-album singles | |
| "Drive" (BadBadNotGood Remix) | 2014 | Dornik | Non-album singles | |
| "Sharpness" (Kaytranada Edit) | 2016 | Jaime Woon | Non-album singles | With Kaytranada |
| "Ultimate" (BBNG Sessions) / "Sick and Tired" (BBNG Sessions) | 2017 | Denzel Curry | Non-album singles | Live with Denzel Curry |
| "Qadir" (BadBadNotGood Remix) | 2021 | Nick Hakim | Will This Make Me Good (The Remixes) | |
| "Black Moon Rising" (BadBadNotGood Remix) | 2021 | Black Pumas | Truth to Power | RSD compilation |
| "Tomorrow" (BadBadNotGood Remix) | 2021 | Brittany Howard | Jaime (Reimagined) | |
| "Mystery" | 2023 | Turnstile | New Heart Designs | Reinterpretation of Glow On |
| "Alien Love Call" | 2023 | Turnstile | New Heart Designs | Reinterpretation of Glow On |
| "Underwater Boi" | 2023 | Turnstile | New Heart Designs | Reinterpretation of Glow On |
| "Marking My Time" (BadBadNotGood Edit) | 2023 | Elmiene | Non-album single | |

=== List of covers performed ===
Listed as artist covered, song, BBNG releases/versions

2011–2012

- Odd Future / Gucci Mane – "The Medley" ("Bastard," "Lemonade," "AssMilk") (Odd Future Sessions, BBNG EP, BBNGLIVE 1, 2011; BBNGLIVE 2, BBNG2, 2012)
- Tyler, The Creator – "Session" (Odd Future Sessions, 2011)
- Tyler, The Creator – "Goblin Medley" ("Untitled 63," "Nightmare," "Yonkers") (Odd Future Sessions, BBNG EP, BBNGLIVE 1, 2011)
- A Tribe Called Quest – "Electric Relaxation" (BBNG EP, BBNGLIVE 1, 2011)
- Waka Flocka Flame – "Hard in the Paint" (BBNG EP, BBNGLIVE 1, BBNGSINGLE, 2011; BBNGLIVE 2, 2012)
- Tyler, The Creator – "Seven" / "Fish" / "Orange Juice" with Tyler, The Creator (Tyler, The Creator x BadBadNotGood unofficial sessions, 2011)
- Slum Village – "Fall in Love" (BBNG, BBNGLIVE 1, 2011)
- Gang Starr / Joy Division – "Mass Appeal / Transmission" (BBNG, 2011)
- Nas / Ol' Dirty Bastard – "The World Is Yours / Brooklyn Zoo" (BBNG, BBNGLIVE 1, 2011)
- Flying Lotus – "Camel" (BBNG, BBNGLIVE 1, 2011)
- The Legend of Zelda – "Title Theme / Saria's Song / Song of Storms" (BBNG, 2011)
- Tyler, The Creator – "She" (unofficial single)
- ASAP Rocky – "Peso" (live dates, 2011–2012)
- MF Doom / Madlib – "DOOM" (medley: "Supervillain Theme," "Fazers," and "Vomitspit") (single, BBNGLIVE 1, 2011)
- Joy Division – "Disorder" (BBNGLIVE 1, 2011)
- Earl Sweatshirt – Earl" feat. Leland Whitty (BBNG2, 2012)
- Feist / James Blake cover – "Limit to Your Love" (BBNGLIVE 2, BBNG2, 2012)
- James Blake – "CMYK" (BBNGLIVE 2, BBNG2, 2012)
- Kanye West – "Flashing Lights" (BBNG2, 2012)
- My Bloody Valentine – "You Made Me Realise" feat. Luan Phung (BBNG2, 2012)
- Soulja Boy – "Pretty Boy Swag Remix" (unofficial single, 2012)

2013–present

- Flying Lotus – "Putty Boy Strut" (tour 2013–2016; Spotify Live, 2017)
- TNGHT – "Bugg'n" (tour, 2013–2015)
- MF Doom & Jneiro Jarel – "Guv'nor (BadBadNotGood Version)" (Keys to the Kuffs (Butter Edition), 2013; Bookhead EP, 2014)
- Freddie Gibbs & Madlib – "Shame" (III bonus track, 2014)
- Future Islands – "Seasons (Waiting on You) [BBNG Reinterpretation]" (Future Islands single, 2014; tour, 2015)
- Dornik – "Drive" (BadBadNotGood Remix) (Dornik single, 2015)
- Ol' Dirty Bastard – "Shimmy Shimmy Ya" with Ghostface Killah (tour, 2015)
- Wu Tang Clan – "I Can't Go to Sleep" / "Tearz" / "Can It Be All So Simple" / "Wu Tang Clan Ain't Nuthing ta F' Wit" / "C.R.E.A.M." with Ghostface Killah (tour, 2015)
- Earl Sweatshirt – "Huey" / "Grief" with Earl Sweatshirt (Jimmy Kimmel Live, 2015)
- Kali Uchis – "Rush" (original track producer) (tour, 2015)
- Vince Guaraldi Trio – "Skating" and "Christmas Time is Here" with Choir! Choir! Choir! (A Charlie Brown Christmas) (The Strombo Show, 2015)
- TheSenseiBlue – "On the Map" with Mick Jenkins (Mick Jenkins single, 2016)
- Kaytranada – "Weight Off" (CBC Music, 2016; tour, 2017)
- The Beach Boys – "God Only Knows" with Jonti (Triple J's Like a Version, 2016)
- Goldlink – "Fall in Love" (original track producer) (tour, 2017–2018)
- The Champs – "Tequila" (tour, 2017–2018)
- Denzel Curry – "Ultimate" / "Sick and Tired" with Denzel Curry (BBNG Sessions, 2017)
- Andy Shauf – "To You" (Late Night Tales: BadBadNotGood, 2017)
- Kanye West – "Ghost Town" (Louis Vuitton x Virgil Abloh Fashion Show, 2018)
- Majestics – "Key to Love (Is Understanding)" feat. Jonah Yano (single, 2019)
- Johnny Hammond – "The Chocolate Conquistadors" with MF Doom (single, 2020; tour, 2021–22)
- Madvillan – "Raid" (tour, 2021–22)
- Arthur Verocai – "Na Boca do Sol" (tour, 2021–22)

== Videography ==
=== Video albums ===
| Title | Album details | Notes | Ref. |
|---|---|---|---|
| Talk Memory | Released: October 8, 2021; Label: XL, Innovative Leisure; Format: VHS | Compilation of the album's short films, released at premiere screenings. | |

=== Music videos ===
As lead artist
| Title | Year | Director(s) | Ref. |
|---|---|---|---|
| "Can't Leave the Night" | 2014 | Connor Olthuis | |
| "Ray Gun" (with Ghostface Killah featuring Doom) | 2015 | Rob Schroeder | |
| "Chompy's Paradise" | 2016 | Connor Crawford | |
| "Lavender" (featuring Kaytranada) | 2016 | Fantavious Fritz | |
| "BBNG X Flockey Ocscor" (with Flockey Ocscor) | 2017 | Flockey Ocscor | |
| "I Don't Know" (featuring Samuel T. Herring) | 2018 | Will Mayer | |
| "Goodbye Blue" (featuring Jonah Yano) | 2020 | Devon Little | |
| "Signal from the Noise" | 2021 | Duncan Loudon | |
| "Sending Signals" (Note: Alternate short film for "Signal from the Noise".) | 2021 | Sylvain Chausée | |
| "Beside April" | 2021 | Camille Summers-Valli | |
| "Love Proceeding" | 2021 | Jamal Burger | |
| "Timid, Intimidating" | 2021 | Winston Hacking | |
| "City of Mirrors" | 2021 | Tomas Morrison | |
| "Talk Meaning" | 2021 | Danica Kleinknecht | |
| "Beside April (Reprise)" | 2021 | Rich Smith | |
| "Unfolding (Momentum 73)" | 2021 | Marvin Lau & Devon Little | |
| "Open Channels" | 2022 | Sylvain Chausée | |

As featured artist
| Title | Year | Director(s) | Ref. |
|---|---|---|---|
| "Drowning" (Mick Jenkins featuring BadBadNotGood) | 2016 | Nathan R. Smith | |
| "Get You" (Daniel Caesar featuring Kali Uchis and BadBadNotGood) | 2016 | Liam MacRae | |
| "Lavender (Nightfall Remix)" (Snoop Dogg featuring BadBadNotGood and Kaytranada) | 2017 | Jesse Wellens & James DeFina | |
| "Nervous" (Jonah Yano and BadBadNotGood) | 2019 | Jonah Yano | |

== See also ==
Collaborative, side, and solo projects

- Jerry Paper (Toon Time Raw!, 2016)
- Charlotte Day Wilson (Stone Woman EP, 2018)
- Matty/Matthew Tavares (Déjàvu, 2018)
- Arrangement Studio (Vol. 1, 2018) (Alexander Sowinski with Leland Whitty and Duncan Hood)
- Disappearance at Clifton Hill score, 2019 (Alexander Sowinski and Leland Whitty)
- Matthew Tavares & Leland Whitty (Visions, 2020; January 12th, 2020)

== Notes ==
Releases

Charts
