= Alexander Sowinski =

Canadian musician (born 1991)

Alex Sowinski
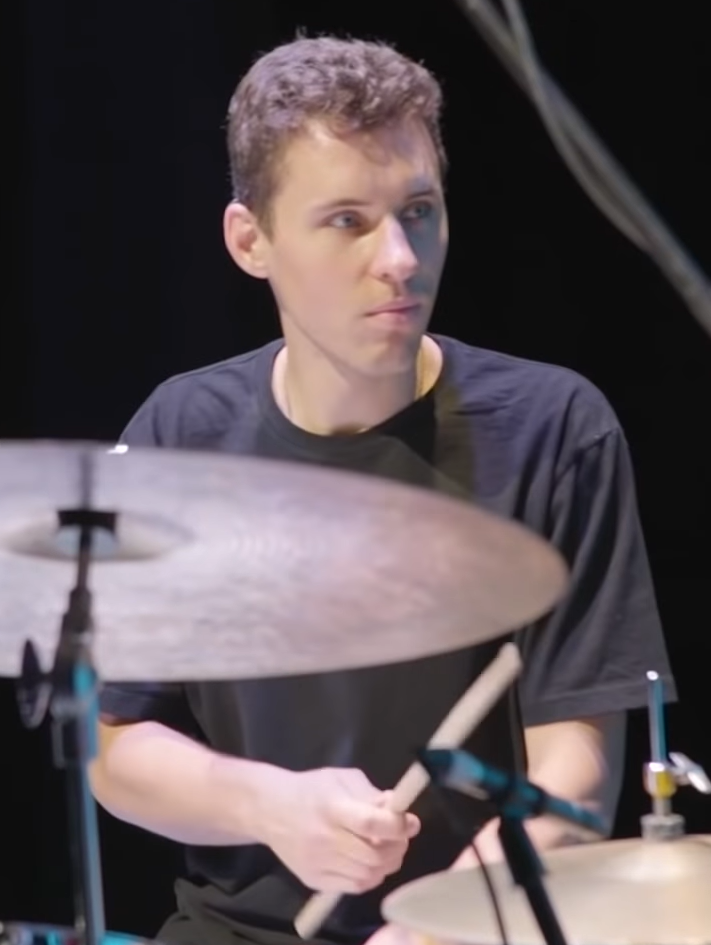
- Sowinski performing with BadBadNotGood in Mexico, 2019

Background information
- Born: Alexander William Sowinski; October 11, 1991 (age 34); Mississauga, Ontario, Canada
- Origin: Toronto, Ontario
- Occupations: Musician; songwriter; producer
- Instruments: Drums; percussion; sampler
- Years active: 2010–present
- Member of: BadBadNotGood

Alexander William Sowinski (born October 11, 1991) is a Canadian musician, producer, and drummer for instrumental group BADBADNOTGOOD. With the band, he has released five studio albums and is noted for his jazz drumming musicianship.

== Life and career ==
Alexander William Sowinski was born on October 11, 1991, and raised in Mississauga, Ontario. There, he attended Lorne Park Secondary School, before moving to Toronto as a teenager and transferring to Humberside Collegiate Institute. He went to high school with future collaborator Charlotte Day Wilson. He is of Polish descent.

Sowinski studied jazz performance at Humber College, where he met his future BBNG bandmates Chester Hansen and Matthew Tavares in class. Before forming BBNG, Sowinski played in a band with musician Tommy Paxton-Beesley, who performs as River Tiber. BADBADNOTGOOD formed in 2010 and had viral success the following year after posting jazz covers of Odd Future online. They released their debut record in Fall 2011. Sowinski both drums and acts as the band's MC from behind his drum kit. Following the rising popularity of BBNG in 2011 and 2012, Sowinski eventually withdrew from Humber.

As of 2021, Sowinski has released six full-length albums with BBNG, including a collaborative record with Ghostface Killah, and has been short-listed for the Polaris Music Prize twice. Also with the group, Sowinski has produced numerous hip hop, R&B, and electronic music singles, including tracks by Kendrick Lamar, Daniel Caeser, and Kali Uchis. Sowinski has also worked as a session musician and songwriter for the past decade, working with producers and musicians like Kaytranada, Frank Dukes, Jerry Paper, and Charlotte Day Wilson, among others.

In 2018, he helped form the Toronto-based design collective Arrangement Studio. With its launch in the Fall of 2018, Sowinski released a volume of experimental ambient music under the name Arrangement, titled Vol. 1., and has released a series of singles since. As part of a related collective, Group Climate, Sowinski also produced a volume of drum breaks for sample usage in late 2020. Sowinski began DJing in 2019 and has since curated a series of experimental DJ mixes under the Arrangement Studio name and co-presented on Worldwide FM.

In 2019, Sowinski composed the soundtrack of the Canadian indie thriller Disappearance at Clifton Hill with BBNG bandmate Leland Whitty.

== Equipment ==
Sowinski plays a Ludwig Maple four-piece drumkit, generally with a 14" tom, 18" floor tom and a 26" kick, and utilizes a Roland SPDS sampler. In the early-2010s, he would often play without a rack tom and have his SPDS mounted on top of the kick drum. He has utilized both Istanbul and vintage Zildjian cymbals, and plays with Headhunter drumsticks.

== Discography ==
With BADBADNOTGOOD

- BBNG (2011)
- BBNG2 (2012)
- III (2014)
- Sour Soul (2015) (with Ghostface Killah)
- IV (2016)
- Talk Memory (2021)

As Arrangement (Arrangement Studio)

- Vol. 01 (2018)
- "Sway" (2020)

Other albums

- Disappearance at Clifton Hill soundtrack (2019) (with Leland Whitty)
- Lost Keys (short film; dir. Amandla Baraka) (2021) (with Leland Whitty)

== Production and songwriting credits ==
Notable production credits as part of BADBADNOTGOOD

- Kendrick Lamar: "Lust" from Damn (2016) (Certifications – US: gold)
- GoldLink: "Fall in Love" (featuring Cisero) (2016)
- Daniel Caesar: "Get You" (2016) (Certifications: US: 2× platinum; CAN: 2× Platinum; UK: silver)
- Kali Uchis: "After the Storm" (featuring Tyler, the Creator and Bootsy Collins) from Isolation (2018) (Certifications – US: gold)
- Khalid and Swae Lee: "The Ways" from Black Panther (2018)

Other credits

- Down by Riverside – From the Ground Up EP (2011); drums
- River Tiber – "Motives" from Indigo (2015); drums, vocals
- Mac Miller – "Perfect Circle / God Speed" from GO:OD AM (2015); drums
- KAYTRANADA and Tuxedo (original artist) – "The Right Time (Kaytranada Rmx)" (2015); drums
- KAYTRANADA – "Flippin on You" from 0.001% mixtape (2017); drums
- Matty – Déjàvu (2018); drums
- Jaunt – "Best Case" from Cue (2018); additional drums
- Charlotte Day Wilson – Stone Woman EP (2018); keys, cymbals, writing, production
- Mick Jenkins – "Understood" from Pieces of a Man (2018); drums, produced with KAYTRANADA
- KAYTRANADA – "Puff Lah" and "Vex Oh" from Bubba (2019); writing, drums
- FRANK LEONE & Hanni El Khatib – "Crown" (feat. Monster Mike) b/w "Solid Gold" from Flu Dogs (2019); writing, sampled drums
- Jaunt – All in One (2020); engineering
- Jonah Yano – "anywhere" and "what i can do to help" from Souvenir (2020); drums/drum programming
- Slauson Malone – "The Wake Pt. 3 & 2" from Vergangenheitsbewältigung (2020); drums
- Justin Nozuka – "summer night o8" single (2021); producer, writing
