= River Tiber (musician) =

Canadian musician (born 1991)

- Also known as: Tommy Paxton-Beesley
- Born: Thomas Rohan Paxton-Beesley; 1991 (age 34–35); Toronto, Ontario, Canada
- Origin: Toronto
- Genres: Indie pop; alternative R&B
- Occupations: Songwriter; musician; record producer
- Instruments: Vocals; keyboards; guitar; bass; drums; cello; violin; trombone
- Years active: 2013–present
- Website: rivertiber.com

Tommy Paxton-Beesley (born 1991), also known as River Tiber, is a Canadian singer, songwriter, multi-instrumentalist and record producer. His Grammy award-winning contributions include Kendrick Lamar’s "Savior" and Kaytranada’s "Freefall", plus Grammy nominations for songwriting and production of global hits by Drake ("No Tellin’"), SZA ("Broken Clocks"), Travis Scott ("Astrothunder"), James Blake ("I Keep Calling"), Giveon ("Like I Want You"), Kendrick Lamar ("Savior"), Charlotte Day Wilson ("Cyan Blue"), and Kaytranada ("Hold On").

Tommy Paxton-Beesley launched River Tiber in 2011. He is embedded in a circle of Canadian musicians including Daniel Caesar, Kaytranada, BADBADNOTGOOD, Charlotte Day Wilson, Frank Dukes, Jazz Cartier, Justin Nozuka, and Sean Leon. Shared compositions and musical conversations including samples, beats, backing vocals and textures have been interwoven and shared between these artists. River Tiber’s voice and instrumentation have formed the cores of work by artists including Travis Scott, James Blake, Giveon, Post Malone, PARTYNEXTDOOR, Freddie Gibbs, Ghostface Killah, Camila Cabello, Kodak Black, Jhene Aiko, Ty Dolla $ign, and Usher.

== Background ==
Paxton-Beesley was born and raised in Toronto, Ontario. He also spent a year in Italy as a child, where he lived near the Tiber River. Growing up, he took part in community music programs and attended the Claude Watson School for the Arts. He attended McGill University before graduating from the Berklee School of Music.

He released his debut EP The Star Falls in 2013, and followed up in 2015 with When the Time Is Right. A track from the latter EP, "No Talk", was sampled by producer Boi-1da for "No Tellin'", from the 2015 album If You're Reading This It's Too Late. Paxton-Beesley has also collaborated with BADBADNOTGOOD on their 2015 album Sour Soul, with Kaytranada on his Polaris Music Prize-winning 99.9%, and with Jazz Cartier on a track for Hotel Paranoia.

He released his debut full-length album Indigo in 2016. In 2017, he won a MuchMusic Video Award for "Acid Test", and the song was a shortlisted finalist for the SOCAN Songwriting Prize in 2017. During the end of the decade, he worked with Toronto artists Charlotte Day Wilson and Daniel Caesar.

On December 9, 2022, he released his sophomore record "Dreaming Eyes". The album release was accompanied by a music video for the track "Hypnotized" which was conceptualized and directed by Leo Aguirre. “Hypnotized” was also sampled on Kendrick Lamar’s "Savior" from his 2023 Grammy Award-winning album Mr. Morale & the Big Steppers.

== Personal life ==
He is the brother of actress Alex Paxton-Beesley. He is the son of visual artist Philip Beesley.

== Discography ==
=== Studio albums ===
- From Now On (2011)
- Synapses (2013)
- Indigo (2016)
- Dreaming Eyes (2022)
- Dreaming Eyes (Instrumentals) (2023)

=== Extended plays ===
- The Star Falls (2013)
- When the Time Is Right (2015)
- Spirals (2025)

=== Singles ===
- "Prophets" (2014)
- "West" with Daniel Caesar from Indigo (2016)
- "Illusions" (feat. Pusha T) / "Gravity" (2016)
- "Acid Test" from Indigo (2016)
- "Patience" (2017)
- "Deep End" (2018)
- "Taurus" (2019)
- "Nevada" (2019)
- "Rainbow Road" / "Hypnotized" (2020)
- "Sent from Above" (2021)
- "Peace" / "Here or There" (2023)
- "Tell Her" / "Stranger" [with Justin Nozuka] (2024)

=== As featured artist ===
- Kaytranada – "Bus Ride" and "Vivid Dreams" (feat. River Tiber) – from 99.9% (2015)
- Selena Gomez – "Kill Em With Kindness - River Tiber Remix" single (2016)
- Jazz Cartier – "Tell Me" (feat. River Tiber) from Hotel Paranoia (2016); also producer
- Junia-T – "Tommy's Intro" (feat. River Tiber & Sean Leon) from Studio Monk (2020)
- Sean Leon - "Memories (Reprise)" (feat. River Tiber) from In Loving Memory (2023)

== Songwriting credits ==
indicates a featured artist contribution.

indicates an additional/co-producer contribution.

indicates a background vocal contribution.

Year	Artist	Album	Song	Co-written with
2014	Justin Nozuka	Ulysees	"Right By You"	Nozuka
2014	Justin Nozuka	Ulysees	"Sweet Lover"	Nozuka
2014	BadBadNotGood	III	"CS60"	Matthew Tavares, Chester Hansen, Alex Sowinski, Frank Dukes
2015	Drake	If You're Reading This It's Too Late	"No Tellin'"	Frank Dukes, et al.
2015	BadBadNotGood & Ghostface Killah	Sour Soul	"Ray Gun" (feat. MF Doom)	Tavares, Hansen, Sowinski, Frank Dukes, MF Doom
2015	BadBadNotGood & Ghostface Killah	Sour Soul	"Experience"	Tavares, Hansen, Sowinski, Frank Dukes
2015	PartyNextDoor	N/A (later released on 2020's Partypack)	"Things & Such" (fka. "Kehlani's Freestyle"	Frank Dukes, et al.
2015	Travis Scott	Rodeo	"Oh My Dis Side"	Frank Dukes, et al.
2015	Mac Miller	GO:OD AM	"ROS"	Frank Dukes, et al.
	Mac Miller	GO:OD AM	"Perfect Circle/Godspeed"	Frank Dukes, et al.
2016	Kaytranada	99.9%	"Bus Ride"	Kaytranada
2016	Kaytranada	99.9%	"Vivid Dreams"	Kaytranada
2016	Jahkoy	Foreign Water	"Selfish"	Frank Dukes, et al.
2016	Usher	Hard II Love	"Make U a Believer"	Frank Dukes, et al.
2017	SZA	Ctrl	"Broken Clocks"	Frank Dukes, Daniel Caesar, et al.
2017	Jhené Aiko	Trip	"Never Call Me"	Frank Dukes, et al.
2018	Travis Scott	Astroworld	"Astrothunder"	Frank Dukes, Matthew Tavares, et al.
2018	Charlotte Day Wilson	Stone Woman	"Falling Apart"	Charlotte Day Wilson, Matthew Tavares
2018	Camila Cabello	Romance	"Feel It Twice"	Frank Dukes, Matthew Tavares, et al.
2019	Kaytranada	Bubba	"Freefall" (feat. Durand Bernarr)	Durand Bernarr, Louis Kevin Celestin
2019	Daniel Caesar	Case Study 01	"Entropy"	Daniel Caesar, et al.
2019	Daniel Caesar	Case Study 01	"Cyanide"	Daniel Caesar, Matthew Burnett, Jordan Evans, et al.
2019	Daniel Caesar	Case Study 01	"Open Up"	Daniel Caesar, Matthew Burnett, Jordan Evans, et al.
2019	Daniel Caesar	Case Study 01	"Superposition" (feat. John Mayer)	Daniel Caesar, Matthew Burnett, Jordan Evans, et al.
2019	Daniel Caesar	Case Study 01	"Too Deep to Turn Back"	Daniel Caesar, Matthew Burnett, Jordan Evans, et al.
2019	Daniel Caesar	Case Study 01	"Are You OK?"	Daniel Caesar, Matthew Burnett, Jordan Evans, et al.
2019	Giveon	Take Time	"Like I Want You"	Jahaan Sweet, et al.
2020	James Blake	Before	"I Keep Calling"	James Blake, Charlotte Day Wilson, Matthew Tavares, et al.
2023	Kendrick Lamar	Mr. Morale & the Big Steppers	"Savior"	Kendrick Lamar, Mario Luciano Dragoi, Mark Spears, Ronald LaTour, Daniel Tannenbaum, Tobais Breuer, J. Pounds, Sam Dew
2024	Kaytranada	Timeless	"Hold On" (feat. Dawn Richard)	Louis Kevin Celestin, Dawn Richard
2024	Charlotte Day Wilson	Cyan Blue	"Money"	Charlotte Day WIlson, Jack Rochon, Jason Robinson, Jonah Yano
2024	Smiley	Don't Box Me In	"Spill The Tea"	Alexandre Morand, Jacier Pearson, Ryan Golden, Kaleb "KK McFly" Harper
2025	Drake & PARTYNEXTDOOR	$ome $exy $ongs For You	"SMALL TOWN FAME"	Aubrey Drake Graham

=== Other credits ===
Albums

- Justin Nozuka – Ulysees (2014); musician
- BadBadNotGood – III (2014); guitar, violin, cello
- BadBadNotGood & Ghostface Killah – Sour Soul (2015); cello, violin, trombone, guitar, organ
- Tess Parks – Blood Hot (2015); co-producer, drums, guitar, bass, tambourine, cello
- Kingsway Music Library – Colors (2015); musician

Tracks

- Daniel Caesar – "Death & Taxes" from Pilgrim's Paradise (2015); music
- Sean Leon – "This Ain't 2012" single (2015); additional vocals
- Freddie Gibbs – "Insecurities" from Shadow of a Doubt (2015); additional vocals
- Daniel Caesar – "Won't Live Here" single (2016); music
- Charlotte Day Wilson – "Where Do You Go" from CDW (2016); producer, bass, cello, violin, synth
- Post Malone – "Cold" from Stoney (2016); background vocals
- Charlotte Day Wilson – "Let You Down" & "Falling Apart" from Stone Woman (2018); strings, synth, vocals, drums
- Kaytranda – "Freefall" from Bubba (2019); synth

== Awards and nominations ==
Year	Association	Category	Nominated work	Result	Ref.
2016	Grammy Awards	Best Rap Album	If You're Reading This It's Too Late (Drake) (as songwriter)	Nominated	
2017	iHeartRadio MMVAs	Best MuchFACT Video	"Acid Test"	Won	
2017	SOCAN Songwriting Prize	Best Song – Anglophone	"Acid Test"	Shortlisted	
2017	SOCAN Songwriting Prize	Best Song – Anglophone	"Won't Live Here" (Daniel Caesar) (as songwriter)	Shortlisted	
2018	Soul Train Music Awards	The Ashford & Simpson Songwriter's Award	"Broken Clocks" (SZA) (as songwriter)	Nominated	
2019	Grammy Awards	Grammy Award for Best Urban Contemporary Album	CTRL (SZA) (as songwriter)	Nominated	
2019	ASCAP Rhythm & Soul Awards	Award Winning R&B/Hip-Hop Songs	"Broken Clocks" (SZA) (as songwriter)	Won	
2019	Grammy Awards	Best Rap Album	Astroworld (Travis Scott) (as songwriter)	Nominated	
2023	Grammy Awards	Best Rap Album	Mr. Morale & The Big Steppers (Kendrick Lamar) (as songwriter)	Won	

== Touring Ensemble/Instrumentation ==
2024-25

River Tiber (Tommy Paxton-Beesley) vocals, guitar, bass, trombone, keys, drums

John Mavro (John Mavrogiannis) — guitar, piano, drums, backing vocals

Dan Only — keys, synths, bass, backing vocals

Guest performer: Justin Nozuka — keys, background vocals

Projections: Maritza Campos, Leo Aguirre
