= Lust (Kendrick Lamar song) =

Song by Kendrick Lamar

from the album Damn
- Released: April 14, 2017
- Recorded: 2017
- Studio: Windmark Studios, Henson Recording Studios
- Genre: Hip-hop
- Length: 5:08
- Label: Top Dawg; Aftermath; Interscope
- Songwriters: Kendrick Duckworth; Dacoury Natche; Mark Spears; Chester Hansen; Alexander Sowinski; Matthew Tavares; Leland Whitty
- Producers: DJ Dahi; Sounwave; BadBadNotGood

"Lust" (stylized as "LUST.") is a song by American rapper Kendrick Lamar, from his fourth studio album Damn, released on April 14, 2017. The ninth track on the album (sixth on the Collector's Edition of Damn), the song was written by Lamar, DJ Dahi, Mark Spears a.k.a. Sounwave, and BadBadNotGood, and was produced by DJ Dahi, Sounwave, and BadBadNotGood. The song features uncredited guest vocals from record producer Kaytranada. Although not released as a single, the song charted in multiple countries in 2017.

== Production ==
The song is about routine; the things we allow to interrupt them, along with romantic lust and material desire. The song's lyrics also reflect Lamar's reaction to the 2016 presidential election, specifically the anger and confusion some of the nation felt in the wake of it. Specifically, Lamar speaks about the protests against Donald Trump, including the struggle to keep the energy up and sustain the protests long-term, without getting fatigued. By the end of the song, the theme of acceptance comes into play.

The song is built off an original composition by BadBadNotGood which features guest vocals from electronic musician Kaytranada. Lamar first met the band at Coachella in 2016, immediately asking the band to collaborate. With Lamar, producers DJ Dahi and Sounwave flipped the track, with additional string arrangements made by jazz saxophonist Kamasi Washington, who played on Lamar's third studio album, To Pimp a Butterfly. The song contains a sample of Rat Boy's 2015 song "Knock Knock Knock", sampled by former collaborator Dahi. When he found out about the sample, Rat Boy tweeted his appreciation.

== Critical reception and tributes ==
Kathleen Johnston of GQ described "Lust" as the best song on Damn.

Months after the release of "Lust" and Damn, creative collective Combined Culture released a short film inspired by the track on June 17, 2017, in celebration of Lamar's 30th birthday earlier in June.

== Live performances ==
Lamar performed "Lust" live at the Coachella Valley Music and Arts Festival on April 23, 2017. He performed the song seated in a cage accentuated by strings of LED lights. Lamar has performed "Lust" on The Damn Tour.

== Credits and personnel ==
Credits adapted from the official Damn digital booklet.

Production and songwriting

- Kendrick Duckworth – songwriter
- Dacoury Natche – songwriter, producer
- Mark Spears – songwriter, producer, strings
- Chester Hansen – songwriter, producer (as part of BADBADNOTGOOD)
- Alexander Sowinski – songwriter, producer (as part of BADBADNOTGOOD)
- Matthew Tavares – songwriter, producer (as part of BADBADNOTGOOD)
- Leland Whitty – songwriter, producer (as part of BADBADNOTGOOD)
- Kamasi Washington – strings
- Kaytranada – additional vocals
- Rat Boy – additional vocals (sample)

Technical

- Derek Ali – mixing
- Tyler Page – mix assistant
- Cyrus Taghipour – mix assistant

== Charts ==
Chart (2017)	Peak position
Canada Hot 100 (Billboard)	35
Czech Republic Singles Digital (ČNS IFPI)	86
France (SNEP)	122
Ireland (IRMA)	36
Netherlands (Single Top 100)	72
New Zealand (Recorded Music NZ)	36
Portugal (AFP)	34
Slovakia Singles Digital (ČNS IFPI)	45
Sweden (Sverigetopplistan)	94
UK Singles (Official Charts)	52
US Billboard Hot 100	43
US Hot R&B/Hip-Hop Songs (Billboard)	25

== Certifications ==
Region	Certification	Certified units/sales
Australia (ARIA)	Gold	35,000^{‡}
Canada (Music Canada)	Platinum	80,000^{‡}
New Zealand (RMNZ)	Gold	15,000^{‡}
United States (RIAA)	Gold	500,000^{‡}
^{‡} Sales+streaming figures based on certification alone.
