= Talk Memory =

Studio album by BadBadNotGood
- Released: October 8, 2021
- Length: 42:11 (digital version)
- Label: XL; Innovative Leisure
- Producer: BadBadNotGood; Floating Points (add.)

BadBadNotGood chronology
Spotify Live EP (2017)	Talk Memory (2021)

Singles from Talk Memory
- 1. "Signal from the Noise" Released: July 15, 2021; 2. "Beside April" Released: September 8, 2021; 3. "Open Channels" Released: March 2, 2022

Talk Memory is the fifth studio album by Canadian instrumental group BadBadNotGood. It was released on October 8, 2021, by XL Recordings and Innovative Leisure, and is the band's first album in five years. A mostly improvisational work, it was produced and written by the trio with contributions from featured American instrumentalists Laraaji, Karriem Riggins, Terrace Martin, and Brandee Younger, and string arrangements from Brazilian composer Arthur Verocai.

Following promotion on social media in early July, the band officially announced the album on July 15, 2021, simultaneously releasing the lead single "Signal from the Noise".

== Background ==
Aside from the 2020 single "Goodbye Blue", this is the first original release to be recorded in five years, since the sessions for IV. In a press release, the band said: "It took a year or two of just living life to get to the place where the creative process was exciting again and once we actually went in to the studio it was the most concise recording and writing process we’ve ever had. We hope that the improvised studio performances bring the listener closer to our live experience."

This is the first album from the band without founding keyboardist Matthew Tavares; he departed in 2019. The long period of time between Talk Memory and IV was partly due to Taveres' leaving the group. As Leland Whitty told PostGenre, "[a]fter [Matt] quit the band in 2019, it took us time to establish a new vision of what the band would be like without him."

== Release and reception ==
Professional ratings
Aggregate scores
Source	Rating
AnyDecentMusic?	7.5/10
Metacritic	80/100
Review scores
Source	Rating
AllMusic	4/5 stars
Clash	8/10
Exclaim!	8/10
NME	3/5 stars
Pitchfork	8/10
The Guardian	4/5 stars

The trio released their first album single on July 15, 2021, "Signal from the Noise"; a "nine-minute psychedelic jazz fusion odyssey", the track was produced with Floating Points and accompanied by a music video directed by Duncan Loudon. The second single, "Beside April", was released on September 8, 2021.

The album was released on October 8, 2021. It is the band's first album with XL Recordings, who released it in partnership with Innovative Leisure (to which the band has been signed since 2013). Multiple limited edition color variants of the LP are available from different retailers, including their web store and VMP (Vinyl Me, Please).

Overall, the album received generally favorable review from critics, with opinions of the album ranging from "virtuosic" to that of "considered jam sessions." In a very positive review, Dean Van Nguyen of Pitchfork commented: “BadBadNotGood are known for turning tradition inside out, but Talk Memory is not just their finest album—it’s evidence of the historic appreciation that roots their reverence;” comparing the album to the group’s previous work, he detailed that “the velvety play and mildly psychedelic grooves are still present, but Talk Memory is also BBNG’s most compositionally complex record to date; it draws you in with vibrant hooks and melodic flourishes, then begs you to return and fully absorb its subtleties.”

The album was longlisted for the 2022 Polaris Music Prize.

=== Accolades ===
Publication	Accolade	Year	Rank
Wired	Albums of the Year	2021	4
Clash	Albums of the Year	2021	48
Okayplayer	Albums of the Year	2021	19
Allmusic	Albums of the Year	2021	–

== Track listing ==
Talk Memory track listing
No.	Title	Writer(s)	Producer(s)	Length
1.	"Signal from the Noise"	Alexander Sowinski; Chester Hansen; Leland Whitty	BadBadNotGood; Sam Shepherd^{[a]}; Tim Pennells^{[b]}	9:02
2.	"Unfolding (Momentum 73)" (featuring Laraaji)	Sowinski; Hansen; Whitty; Edward Gordon	BadBadNotGood	4:30
3.	"City of Mirrors" (featuring Arthur Verocai)	Sowinski; Hansen; Whitty	BadBadNotGood	3:50
4.	"Beside April" (featuring Karriem Riggins and Arthur Verocai)	Sowinski; Hansen; Whitty; Karriem Riggins	BadBadNotGood	5:13
5.	"Love Proceeding" (featuring Arthur Verocai)	Sowinski; Hansen; Whitty	BadBadNotGood	5:25
6.	"Open Channels" (physical version only)	Sowinski; Hansen; Whitty	BadBadNotGood	4:23
7.	"Timid, Intimidating"	Sowinski; Hansen; Whitty	BadBadNotGood	6:17
8.	"Beside April (Reprise)" (featuring Arthur Verocai)	Sowinski; Hansen; Whitty	BadBadNotGood	1:40
9.	"Talk Meaning" (featuring Arthur Verocai, Terrace Martin and Brandee Younger)	Sowinski; Hansen; Whitty; Terrace Martin; Brandee Younger	BadBadNotGood	6:14
Total length:				42:11

Notes

- ^{^[a]} signifies an additional producer.
- ^{^[b]} signifies an assistant producer.
- Arthur Verocai is credited for string arrangements on tracks 3–4 and 8–9.

== Personnel ==
Adapted from album notes.

BadBadNotGood

- Leland Whitty – soprano and tenor saxophone, flute, guitar, bass ("City of Mirrors", "Open Channels"), piano, synthesizer
- Chester Hansen – bass, guitar ("City of Mirrors"), piano, organ, synthesizer
- Al Sow – drums, percussion

Musicians

- Laraaji – electric zither ("Unfolding (Momentum 73)")
- Karriem Riggins – percussion ("Beside April")
- Brandee Younger – harp ("Talk Meaning")
- Terrace Martin – alto saxophone ("Talk Meaning")
- Arthur Verocai – string arrangements
- Clóvis Pereira Filho – violin
- Ubiratã Rodrigues – violin
- Wagner Rodrigues – violin
- André Cunha Rego – violin
- Nikolay Sapoundjiev – violin
- William Issac – violin
- Emila Valova – cello
- Lisiane de los Santos – cello
- David Chew – cello
- Victor Botene – viola
- Samuel Passos – viola
- Nic Jodoin – tape effects

Technical

- Nic Jodoin – engineer
- Travis Pavur – assistant engineer
- William Luna – engineer (Brazil)
- Russell Elevado – mixing
- Alex DeTurk – mastering
- Scott Hull – lacquer cutting
- Matthew Langille – A&R
- Patrick North – A&R

Artwork

- BadBadNotGood – creative direction
- Alaska-Alaska™ (Virgil Abloh, Tawanda Chiweshe, Francisco Gaspar) – creative direction
- Elias Hanzer – typeface
- Jamal Burger – cover photography
- Ivan Narez – gatefold photography

== Charts ==
Chart performance for Talk Memory
Chart (2021)	Peak position
Belgian Albums (Ultratop Flanders)	38
Belgian Albums (Ultratop Wallonia)	143
German Albums (Offizielle Top 100)	61
Portuguese Albums (AFP)	17
Scottish Albums (OCC)	36
UK Independent Albums (OCC)	7
US Top Contemporary Jazz Albums (Billboard)	1
US Top Jazz Albums (Billboard)	3
US Heatseekers Albums (Billboard)	4
US Indie Store Album Sales (Billboard)	5
US Top Album Sales (Billboard)	65
US Vinyl Albums (Billboard)	6
