= Before (James Blake EP) =

EP by James Blake
- Released: 14 October 2020
- Recorded: 2020
- Genre: Dance
- Length: 16:51
- Label: Republic; Polydor
- Producer: James Blake

James Blake chronology
| Assume Form (2019) | Before (2020) | Covers (2020) |

Before is the seventh solo EP by English singer-songwriter James Blake. It was released on 14 October 2020 by Republic and Polydor Records.

== Track listing ==
Before
| No. | Title | Writer(s) | Producer(s) | Length |
|---|---|---|---|---|
| 1. | "I Keep Calling" | James Blake; Charlotte Wilson^{[c]}; Dominic Maker; Erick the Architect; Josh Stadlen; Kalim Graham Patel; Matthew Tavares^{[c]}; Thomas Paxton-Beesley^{[c]} | James Blake; Maker^{[a]}; Erick the Architect^{[b]}; Jameela Jamil^{[b]}; Stadlen^{[b]}; Kushi^{[b]} | 4:06 |
| 2. | "Before" | Blake; Maker | Blake; Maker^{[a]}; Jamil^{[b]} | 4:48 |
| 3. | "Do You Ever" | Blake; Nico Muhly | Blake | 3:45 |
| 4. | "Summer of Now" | Blake | Blake; Maker^{[b]}; Jamil^{[b]} | 4:12 |
| Total length: | | | | 16:51 |

Notes

- ^{^[a]} indicates a co-producer
- ^{^[b]} indicates an additional producer
- ^{^[c]} "I Keep Calling" samples "Falling Apart", written by Charlotte Day Wilson, Matthew Tavares, and Thomas Paxton-Beesley, and performed by Charlotte Day Wilson.

== Personnel ==
Credits adapted from Tidal.

- James Blake – vocals (all tracks), engineer (all tracks), mixer (all tracks), programming (4)
- Carl Bespolka – engineer (1)
- Josh Stadlen – piano (1)
- Peter Lee Johnson – violin (1), strings (2)
- Nico Muhly – string arranger (3)
- Nathan Schram – viola (3)
