= Sour Soul (album) =

Studio album by BadBadNotGood and Ghostface Killah
- Released: February 24, 2015
- Recorded: 2014
- Studios: Dunham Studios (Brooklyn); Kingsway Studios (Toronto)
- Genres: Hip-hop; jazz fusion
- Length: 32:55
- Label: Lex
- Producer: Frank Dukes

BadBadNotGood chronology
| III (2014) | Sour Soul (2015) | IV (2016) |

Ghostface Killah chronology
| 36 Seasons (2014) | Sour Soul (2015) | Twelve Reasons to Die II (2015) |

Singles from Sour Soul
- 1. "Six Degrees" Released: June 20, 2014; 2. "Tone's Rap" Released: June 20, 2014; 3. "Gunshowers" Released: October 17, 2014; 4. "Ray Gun" Released: January 9, 2015

Sour Soul is a collaborative studio album from Canadian jazz instrumental hip hop band BadBadNotGood and Wu-Tang Clan member Ghostface Killah. It was released worldwide on February 24, 2015.

== Production ==
Sour Soul is the collaborative album from for which BBNG and Ghostface Killah sought inspiration from the music of the 1960s and 70s. This included the recording techniques and production of that era, eschewing sampling in favor of live instrumentation. All tracks are produced by Frank Dukes, with additional production from BadBadNotGood and Wayne Gordon. MF Doom, Elzhi, Danny Brown and Tree contributed feature guest spots. Ghostface does not appear on tracks 1, 5 and 12, which are instrumental tracks.

A majority of tracks were recorded in Thomas Brenneck's Dunham Sound Studios in Williamsburg, Brooklyn with contributors from New York soul revival scene including sessions musicians from The Budos Band and Daptone Records engineer Wayne Gordon. Other recording sessions took place in Frank Dukes' Kingsway Studios with contributions from Toronto artists River Tiber and David Lewis.

=== Sour Soul (Instrumentals) ===
As a companion record, Lex Records simultaneously released an instrumental version of the album.

== Critical reception ==
Professional ratings
Aggregate scores
| Source | Rating |
|---|---|
| AnyDecentMusic? | 7.3/10 |
| Metacritic | 76/100 |
Review scores
| Source | Rating |
| AllMusic | 3.5/5 stars |
| Billboard | 4.0/5 stars |
| Drowned in Sound | 9/10 |
| Exclaim! | 6/10 |
| HipHopDX | 3.5/5 stars |
| Paste | 8/10 |
| Pitchfork | 6.2/10 |

Sour Soul received generally favorable reviews from music critics. At Metacritic, which assigns a weighted average score out of 100 to reviews from mainstream critics, the album received an average score of 76, based on 27 reviews. In a mixed review for Exclaim!, Eric Zaworski noted that the record "hurriedly finishes without giving its concepts enough time to bloom," further explaining that "the production is top-notch, but Ghost rarely shifts into uncharted lyrical territory, holding back Sour Soul's otherwise consistent production."

In an extremely positive review, giving the album a score of 9 out of 10, Sam Moore wrote for Drowned in Sound that "Sour Soul is sublime." Adding that "rather than standing around starstruck, BBNG have more than proven their worth as Ghostface’s backing band."

The album was a short-listed nominee for the 2015 Polaris Music Prize.

== Track listing ==
| No. | Title | Writer(s) | Length |
|---|---|---|---|
| 1. | "Mono" (instrumental) | Frank Dukes; Alex Sowinski; Matty Tavares; Chester Hansen; Dennis Coles | 0:58 |
| 2. | "Sour Soul" | Dukes; Sowinski; Tavares; Hansen; Coles; Wayne Gordon | 2:45 |
| 3. | "Six Degrees" (featuring Danny Brown) | Dukes; Sowinski; Tavares; Hansen; Coles; Gordon | 3:40 |
| 4. | "Gunshowers" (featuring Elzhi) | Dukes; Sowinski; Tavares; Hansen; Coles; Gordon; Thomas Brenneck | 3:03 |
| 5. | "Stark's Reality" (instrumental) | Dukes; Sowinski; Tavares; Hansen; Coles | 2:12 |
| 6. | "Tone's Rap" | Dukes; Sowinski; Tavares; Hansen; Coles | 2:58 |
| 7. | "Mind Playing Tricks" | Dukes; Sowinski; Tavares; Hansen; Coles | 2:37 |
| 8. | "Street Knowledge" (featuring Tree) | Dukes; Sowinski; Tavares; Hansen; Coles; Gordon; Tremaine Johnson | 3:24 |
| 9. | "Ray Gun" (featuring MF Doom) | Dukes; Sowinski; Tavares; Hansen; Coles; Tommy Paxton Beesly; Leland Whitty | 3:07 |
| 10. | "Nuggets of Wisdom" | Dukes; Sowinski; Tavares; Hansen; Coles | 2:11 |
| 11. | "Food" | Dukes; Sowinski; Tavares; Hansen; Coles | 3:23 |
| 12. | "Experience" (instrumental) | Dukes; Sowinski; Tavares; Hansen; Coles; Beesly | 2:37 |
| Total length: | | | 32:55 |

== Personnel ==
Credits adapted from the album's liner notes.

BADBADNOTGOOD and Ghostface Killah

- Matthew Tavares – guitar, keyboards, synthesizers; producer, engineer, mixing
- Chester Hansen – bass guitar, keyboards; producer
- Alexander Sowinski – drums, percussion, synthesizer, vibraphone; producer
- Ghostface Killah – rapping

Additional contributors

- Frank Dukes – producer, engineer, mixing, vibraphone
- Leland Whitty – saxophone, viola
- Tommy Paxton-Beesley – cello, violin, trombone, guitar, organ
- David Lewis – tuba
- Thomas Brenneck – guitar (track 4)
- Wayne Gordon – guitar (track 3), production, engineer
- Jared Tankel – baritone saxophone
- Billy Aukstik – trumpet
- Nadav Same Nirenberg – trombone
- Freddy DeBoe – tenor saxophone
- Stephen Koszler – mixing
- Noel Summervile – mastering

== Charts ==
| Chart (2015) | Peak position |
|---|---|
| Australian Albums (ARIA) | 54 |
| Australian Hitseekers Albums (ARIA) | 1 |
| Australian Urban Albums (ARIA) | 5 |
| Belgian Albums (Ultratop Flanders) | 196 |
| US Billboard 200 | 109 |
| US Top Rap Albums (Billboard) | 6 |
| US Top R&B/Hip-Hop Albums (Billboard) | 9 |
| US Independent Albums (Billboard) | 12 |
| US Indie Store Album Sales (Billboard) | 12 |
| US Vinyl Albums (Billboard) | 5 |
