= Tree (rapper) =

American rapper

MC Tree G
- Also known as: Tree
- Born: Tremaine Johnson; October 1983; Chicago, Illinois, U.S.
- Genre: Hip hop
- Occupations: Rapper; producer
- Years active: 2010–present

Tremaine Johnson is a rapper and producer who is better known by his stage name Tree or MC Tree G. He is responsible for cultivating his own unique sound called "Soul Trap", the fusion of the soul music of the past with present-day rap.

== Early life ==
Tree was brought up in the Cabrini-Green project, the second largest housing project in Chicago, Illinois. He would go to Chicago Salem Church with his grandmother, where he first developed an interest in music and started singing. He attended DuSable High School.

Tree was later forced to move to a different end of the Cabrini-Green projects after his parents separated. He worked odd jobs, like shining shoes at Shedd Aquarium, the Rock N Roll McDonald's, and for the printing company, Forslund Grabowski, in 2001. While at Forslund Grabowski, Tree started to rap, produce and record seriously. He worked for nine years in the women's footwear department at Nordstrom before leaving to officially pursue his music career.

== Career ==
Tree received support from the producers of Project Mayhem and started writing music in the 1990s but didn't release any music until 2010, when he was 27 years-old. He started recording under the nickname his family had for him, Tree, short for Tremaine. In 2010, he released his debut album, The 3rd Floor. After that, he released Sunday School, which made MTV's Top Mixtapes of the Year list in 2012, Sunday School II, 2015's Trap Genius, and 2019's WE Grown NOW. In 2021, he released the album Soul Trap.

== Discography ==
=== Albums ===
- The 3rd Floor (2010)
- Sunday School (2012)
- Sunday School II: When Church Lets Out (2013)
- Trap Genius (2015)
- WE Grown NOW. (2019)
- The Wild End (2019) - with Parallel Thought
- Soul Trap (2021)
- FREE TREE (2023)

=== EPs ===
- The Lit (2012)
- Trillin (2012) - with 110% Pure
- The @Mctreeg EP (2014)
- #TreeSwag (2014) - with Chris Crack
- Tree + Crack (2014) - with Chris Crack
- VicTree EP (2015) - with Vic Spencer
- I.B. Tree (2016) - with I.B.C.L.A.S.S.I.C.
- The Johnson & Johnson EP (2017) - with Nemesis
- The Tree EP (2017)
- Goat (2018)
- The Blue Tape (2020)
