= III (BadBadNotGood album) =

Studio album by BadBadNotGood
- Released: May 6, 2014
- Studio: Revolution Recording (Toronto); Studio 69 (Toronto)
- Genre: Instrumental hip-hop; jazz
- Length: 48:28
- Label: Innovative Leisure, Pirates Blend
- Producer: BadBadNotGood, Frank Dukes

BadBadNotGood chronology
BBNG2 (2012)	III (2014)	Sour Soul (2015)

Singles from III
- 1. "Hedron" Released: 2013; 2. "Can't Leave the Night" Released: 2014; 3. "CS60" Released: 2014

III is the third studio album from Canadian jazz instrumental hip-hop band BadBadNotGood. It was released on May 6, 2014. It is the group's first album of completely original material.

== Reception ==
Professional ratings
Aggregate scores
Source	Rating
Metacritic	72/100
Review scores
Source	Rating
AllMusic	3.5/5 stars
CMJ	favourable
Exclaim!	8/10
NME	7/10
Now	4/5 stars
PopMatters	7/10
The 405	7/10

Upon its release, III received positive reviews. At Metacritic, which assigns a weighted mean rating out of 100 to reviews from mainstream critics, the album received an average score of 72 based on 8 reviews, which indicates "generally favorable".

In the review for AllMusic, James Pearce claimed that "III captures the raw energy, togetherness, and musicianship of a live concert, at points drifting off at a tangent and then rejoining to climactic chord structures and beautiful jazz melodies.''

The album was a longlisted nominee for the 2014 Polaris Music Prize.

''Can't Leave the Night'' was used as the opening theme music for the 2023 Netflix series Lockwood & Co.

== Track listing ==
All songs are produced by BADBADNOTGOOD and Frank Dukes.

No.	Title	Length
1.	"Triangle"	3:47
2.	"Can't Leave the Night"	4:39
3.	"Confessions" (featuring Leland Whitty)	5:01
4.	"Kaleidoscope"	7:06
5.	"Eyes Closed"	5:58
6.	"Hedron"	5:41
7.	"Differently, Still"	4:43
8.	"Since You Asked Kindly"	4:41
9.	"CS60"	6:52
Total length:		48:28

Rappcats Exclusive Version
No.	Title	Length
10.	"Shame (Freddie Gibbs & Madlib – BBNG Remix)"	3:12
Total length:		51:40

== Personnel ==
Credits adapted from the album's liner notes.

BADBADNOTGOOD

- Matthew Tavares – piano, keyboards, synthesizer, electric guitar; composer and producer
- Chester Hansen – bass guitar, upright bass, electric guitar, synthesizer, sampler; composer and producer
- Alexander Sowinski – drums, percussion, synthesizer, sampler; composer and producer, photographer

Additional contributors

- Leland Whitty – tenor & baritone saxophone, bass clarinet; violin & viola (track 5); composer (track 3)
- Tommy Paxton-Beesley – cello & violin; electric guitar (track 9); string arranger (track 9)
- Tom Moffat – trumpet
- Frank Dukes – producer, assistant engineer
- Stephen Koszler – mixing, engineer
- Matt MacNeil – assistant engineer
- João Carvalho – mastering

== Charts ==
Chart (2014)	Peak position
Belgian Albums (Ultratop Flanders)	90
US Top Dance Albums (Billboard)	10
US Top Jazz Albums (Billboard)	2
US Top Contemporary Jazz Albums (Billboard)	1
US Heatseekers Albums (Billboard)	10
