= Matthew Tavares =

Canadian musician, songwriter, and music producer

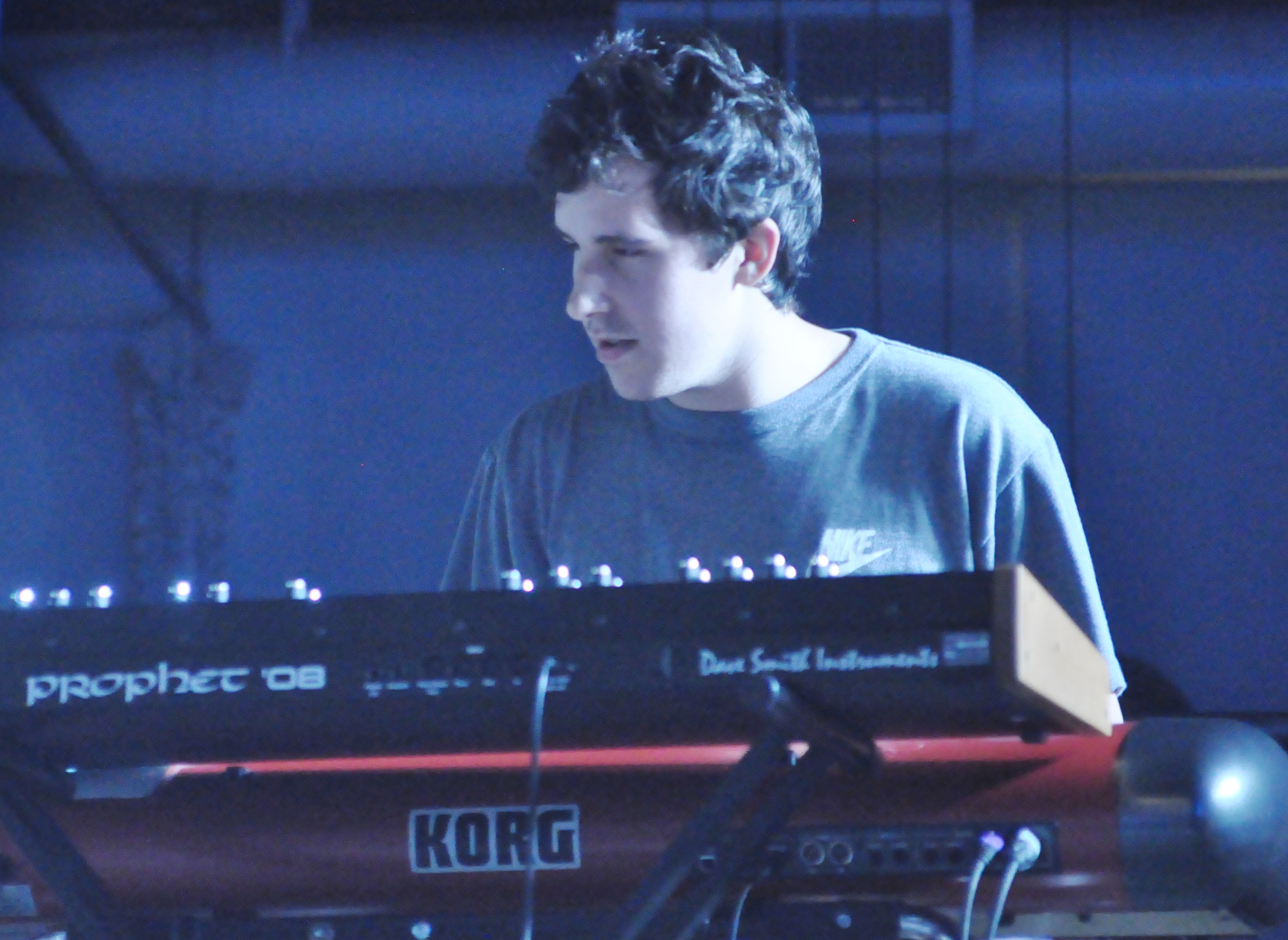
- Tavares in 2012

Background information
- Also known as: Matty
- Born: Matthew A. Tavares; September 15, 1990 (age 35); Mississauga, Ontario, Canada
- Origin: Toronto, Ontario
- Genres: Post-bop, jazz fusion, instrumental hip hop, R&B, ambient, indie rock
- Occupations: Musician; record producer; songwriter
- Instruments: Keyboards; guitar
- Years active: 2010–present
- Formerly of: BadBadNotGood
- Website: http://matthewtavares.ca/

Matthew Adam Tavares (born September 15, 1990), also known as Matty, is a Canadian musician, songwriter, and music producer. He is best known as a founder of the instrumental group BADBADNOTGOOD, with whom he released five studio albums and produced with for other artists. Tavares released his first solo album in 2018 and has since released a series of solo and collaborative genre-spanning albums. As a songwriter, he has helped pen songs for the likes of Post Malone, Rosalía, Camilla Cabello, Kendrick Lamar, and Kali Uchis, and often works with producer Frank Dukes.

== Life and career ==
Matthew Adam Tavares was born on September 15, 1990, and grew up in Mississauga, Ontario where he attended the local preparatory school Mentor College. He attended Humber College where he studied jazz performance and later met drummer Alexander Sowinski and bassist Chester Hansen in the program. In 2010, they formed BADBADNOTGOOD. The band had viral success in 2011 after posting jazz covers of Odd Future online, and released their debut record that Fall. He withdrew from school in February 2012.

With BBNG, Tavares released five full-length albums, including a collaborative record with Ghostface Killah, and was short-listed for the Polaris Music Prize twice. Following the release of their album IV in 2016, Tavares stepped away from touring with the group, and took time to focus on producing music as well as developing his solo project Matty. However, he did make live appearances with BBNG from time-to-time, playing at the likes of Massey Hall in 2017, and the Virgil Abloh-curated Louis Vuitton Spring/Summer runway show, and in Tokyo in 2018, among other venues.

Tavares has worked as a songwriter and music producer throughout his career, often producing tracks as part of BBNG and with producer Frank Dukes. Major early placements include tracks by Wu-Tang Clan, and Daniel Caesar, followed by songs by Kendrick Lamar, Taylor Swift, Post Malone, and Rosalía.

Tavares released his debut solo record in 2018, Déjàvu, under the name Matty. The project utilized the other members of BBNG as the backing band. That year, he also scored the CBC ten-part video game docuseries The Artists. Following a series of singles released after the record, Tavares began using his full name for some of his solo work. In October 2019, Tavares announced his departure from BBNG. In 2020, he released three full-length solo albums as well as two collaborative jazz albums with former BBNG bandmate Leland Whitty. In 2020, he was nominated for a Latin Grammy for his production work on the Rosalía song "Dolerme".

Tavares is based in Toronto.

== Discography ==
=== As lead artist ===
Studio albums

- Déjàvu (2018) (as Matty)
- Visions (2020) (with Leland Whitty)
- Richard Dry (2020)
- Mississauga (2020)
- Selected Ambient Squirts (2020) (as Matty)
- January 12th (2020) (with Leland Whitty)
- Danica (2021) (as Matty)
- Eis O Homem (2023) (as Matty)

=== With BADBADNOTGOOD ===
- BBNG (2011)
- BBNG2 (2012)
- III (2014)
- Sour Soul (with Ghostface Killah) (2015)
- IV (2016)

=== Other projects ===
- Score of CBC documentary series The Artists (2018)
- Homer – Best New Music (2019)
- Kingsway Music Library – Matthew Tavares Vol. 1 (2019)
- Kingsway Music Library – Parkscapes Vol. 2 (Matthew Tavares) (2020)
- Other sample compilations
- Dandelion - All You Know (2022)

== Production discography ==
=== Production and songwriting ===
Selected discography. For additional credits, see the BadBadNotGood production discography (2011–2020).

Year	Artist	Album	Song	Produced with/by	Certifications
2011	Idle Warship	The Man with the Iron Fists	"Get Your Way (Sex Is a Weapon)"	BBNG, Frank Dukes	
2011	Wu-Tang Clan & Kool G Rap	The Man with the Iron Fists	"Rivers of Blood"	BBNG, Frank Dukes	
2013	Earl Sweatshirt	Doris	"Hoarse"	BBNG	
2013	Danny Brown	Old	"Float On" (feat. Charli XCX)	BBNG, Frank Dukes	
2014	Logic	Under Pressure	"Growing Pains III"‡	Frank Dukes, et al.	
2015	Daniel Caesar	Pilgrims's Paradise	"Paradise"	BBNG, et al.	
2015	Wiz Khalifa & Curren$y	#2009	"Weed Nap"‡	Frank Dukes, et al.	
2015	Kali Uchis	Por Vida	"Rush"	BBNG, Kaytranada	
2016	Kaytranada	99.9%	"Weight Off	BBNG, Kaytranada	
2016	Mick Jenkins	The Healing Component	"Drowning"	BBNG	
2016	Kendrick Lamar	Damn	"Lust"	BBNG, et al.	RIAA: Gold
2016	Daniel Caesar	Get You – Single	"Get You" (feat. Kali Uchis)†	BBNG, et al.	RIAA: 2× Platinum; MC: 2× Platinum; BPI: Silver
2016	Daniel Caesar	Get You – Single	"Japanese Denim"	BBNG, et al.	
2016	Jerry Paper	Toon Time Raw!	—	Jerry Paper	
2016	Post Malone	Stoney	"Déjà Vu" (feat. Justin Bieber)‡	Frank Dukes, et al.	RIAA: Platinum
2016	GoldLink	N/A	"Fall in Love" (feat. Cisero)	BBNG	
2017	Lil Pump	Lil Pump	"Flex Like Ouu"‡	Frank Dukes, et al.	RIAA: Gold
2017	Ben Stevenson	Cara Cara	"Honeycola"‡	N/A	
2017	Sufyvn	N/A	"Thinking 'Bout You (Sleepless in Cairo) (feat. BJ the Chicago Kid)	Sufyvn Ali, Doc McKinney	
2017	Kodak Black	Project Baby 2	"Unexplainable"†	Frank Dukes, et al.	
2018	Kali Uchis	Isolation	"After the Storm" (feat. Tyler, the Creator & Bootsy Collins)	BBNG	RIAA: Gold
2018	Travis Scott	Astroworld	"Astrothunder"†	Frank Dukes, et al.	
2018	John Mayer	N/A	"New Light"‡ (Note: While most often uncredited, Tavares produced the looped sample in "New Light.")	John Mayer, No I.D.	RIAA: Platinum; MC: Gold; ARIA: Gold
2018	Khalid & Swae Lee	Black Panther	"The Ways"	BBNG, et al.	
2018	Jerry Paper	Like A Baby	—	Jerry Paper	
2018	Wes Allen	Funny Thing EP	"Ask Me Now"†	Chester Hansen	
2018	Wes Allen	Funny Thing EP	"1 Kiss"†	Chester Hansen	
2018	Wes Allen	Funny Thing EP	"Funny Thing"†	Chester Hansen	
2018	Charlotte Day Wilson	Stone Woman EP	"Doubt"	Charlotte Day Wilson	
2018	Charlotte Day Wilson	Stone Woman EP	"Let You Down"‡	Charlotte Day Wilson, Duncan Hood	
2018	Charlotte Day Wilson	Stone Woman EP	"Falling Apart"	Sole producer	
2018	Harrison	Apricity	"Midnight Snack"	N/A	
2018	Thundercat	Brainfeeder X / It Is What It Is	"King of the Hill"	BBNG, et al.	
2019	Camila Cabello	Romance	"Feel It Twice"	Frank Dukes	
2019	Post Malone	Hollywood's Bleeding	"Staring at the Sun" (feat. SZA)	Frank Dukes, et al.	MC: Gold
2019	Post Malone	Hollywood's Bleeding	"Myself"‡	Frank Dukes, et al.	
2019	Taylor Swift	Lover	"Afterglow"‡	Frank Dukes, et al.	
2019	Taylor Swift	Lover	"It's Nice to Have a Friend"‡	Frank Dukes, et al.	
2019	Bakar	Will You Be My Yellow?	"Ghosts"	Sole producer	
2019	Joy Again	N/A	"Country Song"	Caleb Laven	
2019	Paul Epworth	Voyager – Single	"Voyager 2" (feat. Matty)	Paul Epworth	
2020	Jessie Ware	What's Your Pleasure?	"Mirage (Don't Stop)"	James Ford, Benji B	
2020	Rosalía	N/A	"Dolerme"†	Frank Dukes, et al.	
2020	Gabriel Garzón-Montano	Agüita	"Tombs"‡	Gabriel Garzón-Montano	
2020	Maeta	Habits	"Teen Scene" (feat. Buddy)‡	Kaytranada	
2020	James Blake	Before EP	"I Keep Calling"‡ (Note: "I Keep Calling" samples Charlotte Day Wilson's "Falling Apart," which he produced.)	James Blake, et al.	
2020	Shawn Mendes	Wonder	"Monster" (feat. Justin Bieber)†	Frank Dukes, Daniel Caesar, et al.	MC: Platinum
2021	Vegyn	Like a Good Old Friend	"So Much Time – So Little Time"‡	Vegyn, et al.	
2021	Ben Stevenson	Whatever & Ever	"Number One"‡		
2021	Mustafa	When Smoke Rises	"The Hearse"‡	Frank Dukes, Jaime xx	
2021	Mustafa	When Smoke Rises	"Ali"†	Frank Dukes, Simon on the Moon, Rodaidh McDonald	
2021	TOBi	N/A	"Don't Touch"	BadBadNotGood	
2021	Charlotte Day Wilson	Alpha	"I Can Only Whisper" (feat. BadBadNotGood)‡	BBNG, et al.	

indicates a featured artist contribution.

"—" denotes production of the entire album/release.

"†" denotes credit as co-producer or additional production.

"‡" denotes credit as songwriter only.

=== Other credits ===
- Black Atlass – "Burning Man" from Young Bloods (2014); mixing
- Eschaton – ∆ (2014); guitar, keys
- Eschaton – "Toronto, Ottawa, Low" from Tour Tape Two (2015); synth
- Kingsway Music Library – "Terco," "House Of Lawd," and "Dark Massage" from Colors^{[FD]} (2015); keys
- River Tiber – "No Talk" from Indigo (2016); mixing
- Eschaton – Torus (2016); engineering, mixing, bass guitar
- Kilmanjaro – A Place Unknown To All You Ever Say (2017); mastering
- Katie McBride – "The Skyline" and "N.B.S.L." from World of Dreams (2018); drum production
