= BadBadNotGood =

Canadian instrumental group

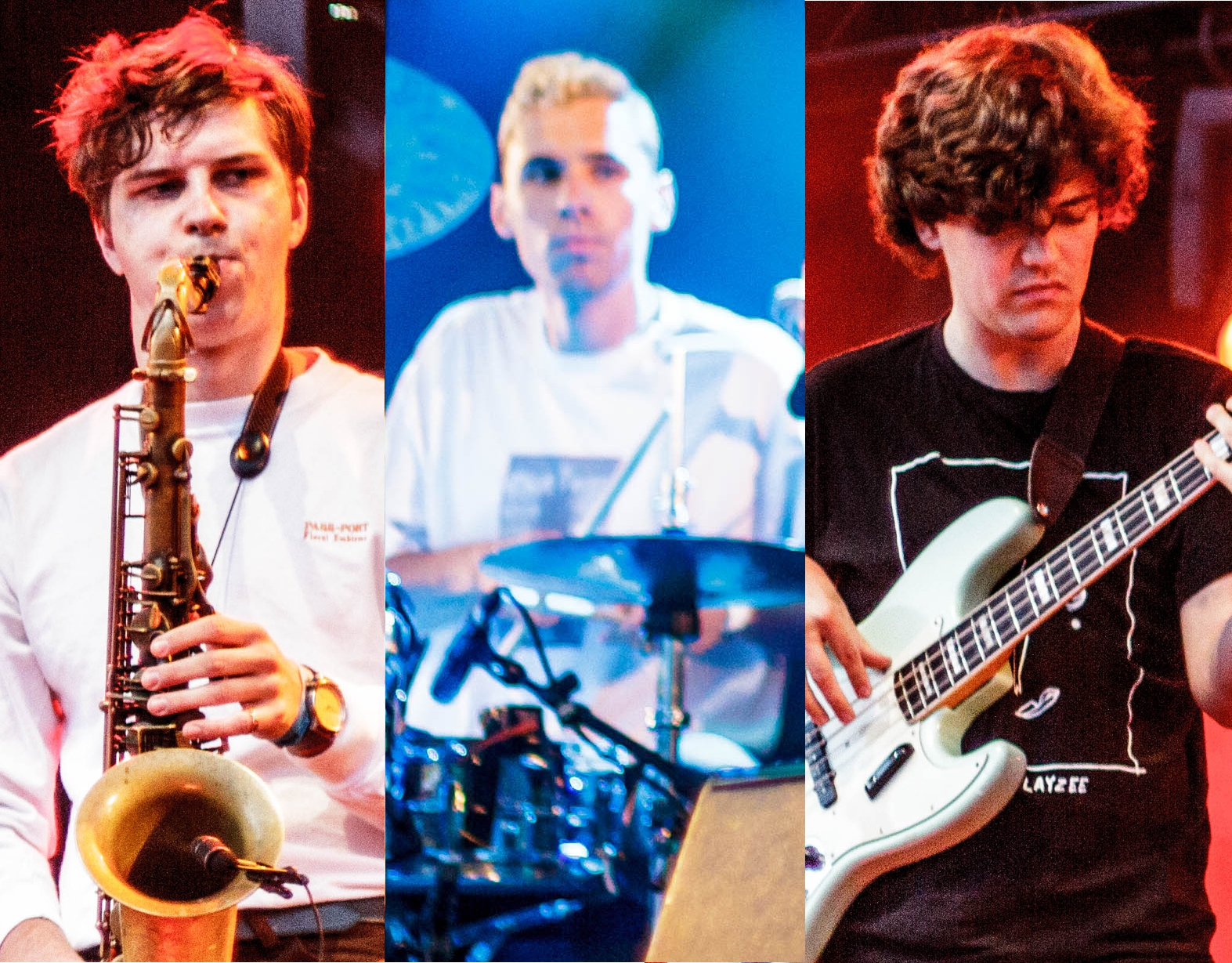
- BadBadNotGood performing in Germany in 2017. From left to right: Leland Whitty, Alexander Sowinski, Chester Hansen

Background information
- Also known as: Easy Feelings Unlimited
- Origin: Toronto, Ontario, Canada
- Genres: Jazz; hip hop; psychedelia
- Years active: 2010–present
- Labels: Innovative Leisure; Arts & Crafts; Lex; XL Recordings
- Members: Chester Hansen; Alexander Sowinski; Leland Whitty
- Past members: Matthew Tavares
- Website: badbadnotgood.com

BadBadNotGood (stylized in all caps) is a Canadian instrumental band and production team from Toronto, Canada. The group was founded in 2010 by bassist Chester Hansen, keyboardist Matthew Tavares, and drummer Alexander Sowinski. In 2016, they were joined by frequent collaborator Leland Whitty. Among other projects, the group has released six solo studio albums, with the latest, Mid Spiral, released in July 2024. They have had critical and crossover success, finding audiences in the hip hop, jazz, and alternative music communities.

The group combines jazz musicianship with a hip hop production perspective and are well known for their collaborations with artists like Tyler, The Creator, Daniel Caesar, Mick Jenkins, Kendrick Lamar, Ghostface Killah, Charlotte Day Wilson, Baby Rose, Arthur Verocai and MF Doom. For their songwriting and production work, they have been nominated for five Grammy Awards, winning two.

== History ==
=== 2010–2012: Beginnings and mixtapes ===
Matthew Tavares, Alexander Sowinski, and Chester Hansen met in 2010 through the Humber College jazz program in Toronto. The trio united over a shared love for hip hop music, including that of MF Doom and Odd Future. In this lineup, Tavares handled keys, playing rhythms on a Prophet '08 and electric piano, joined by Hansen, an acoustic and electric bassist, and drummer Sowinski. Sowinski often donned a pig mask during performances in the first years of the group, in part inspired by MF Doom. The name of the band came from the tentative title of a comedy television project that Tavares was working on, which was eventually abandoned. In a 2012 interview, the trio commented that both Tavares and Hansen had since withdrawn from Humber, while Sowinski had remained enrolled "for the school's dental plan;" Sowinski later left Humber as well.

One of BadBadNotGood's first collaborations was a cover of "Lemonade" by Gucci Mane. They played a piece based on Odd Future's music for a panel of their jazz performance instructors, who did not find that it had musical value. After they released the track on YouTube as The Odd Future Sessions Part 1, it got the attention of rapper Tyler, The Creator, who felt differently and helped the trio's video go viral. BadBadNotGood uploaded their first EP BBNG to Bandcamp in June 2011, which included covers of songs from A Tribe Called Quest, Waka Flocka Flame and several tracks from Odd Future.

In September 2011, they released their debut album, BBNG, recorded in a three-hour session. Dante Alighieri on Sputnikmusic called the album "a welcome reinterpretation of modern jazz without the pretense of snotty wine parties and thick rimmed hipster dinosaurs." The trio had their first show together at The Red Light in Toronto that September. There, they met hip hop producer Frank Dukes who would become a close collaborator. The album was followed by two live records, BBNGLIVE 1 and BBNGLIVE 2, which were released in November 2011 and February 2012, respectively.

BadBadNotGood recorded a live jam session with Tyler, The Creator in Sowinski's basement in October 2011. Videos from the session received more than a million views between them on YouTube. In the following year, they also connected with other Odd Future members like Earl Sweatshirt and Frank Ocean and their contemporaries Joey Badass and Danny Brown, among others. The trio opened for Roy Ayers at the Nujazz Festival in January 2012 and played for Gilles Peterson's Worldwide Awards in London. At a February tribute to J Dilla in Toronto, their covers of "Lemonade" and "Hard in da Paint" had hundreds moshing.

"CHSTR"
A sample of BadBadNotGood's "CHSTR". The song is an original composition from the 2012 album BBNG2.

BadBadNotGood released their second album, BBNG2, in April 2012. Recorded from a ten-hour studio session, it features Leland Whitty on saxophone and Luan Phung playing electric guitar. The notes to the album indicate that "No one above the age of 21 was involved in the making of this album." The album has original material as well as covers of songs by Kanye West, My Bloody Valentine, James Blake, Earl Sweatshirt, and Feist.

The trio was the band-in-residence at the 2012 Coachella Valley Music and Arts Festival and backed Frank Ocean of Odd Future both weekends.

=== 2013–2015: III and Sour Soul ===
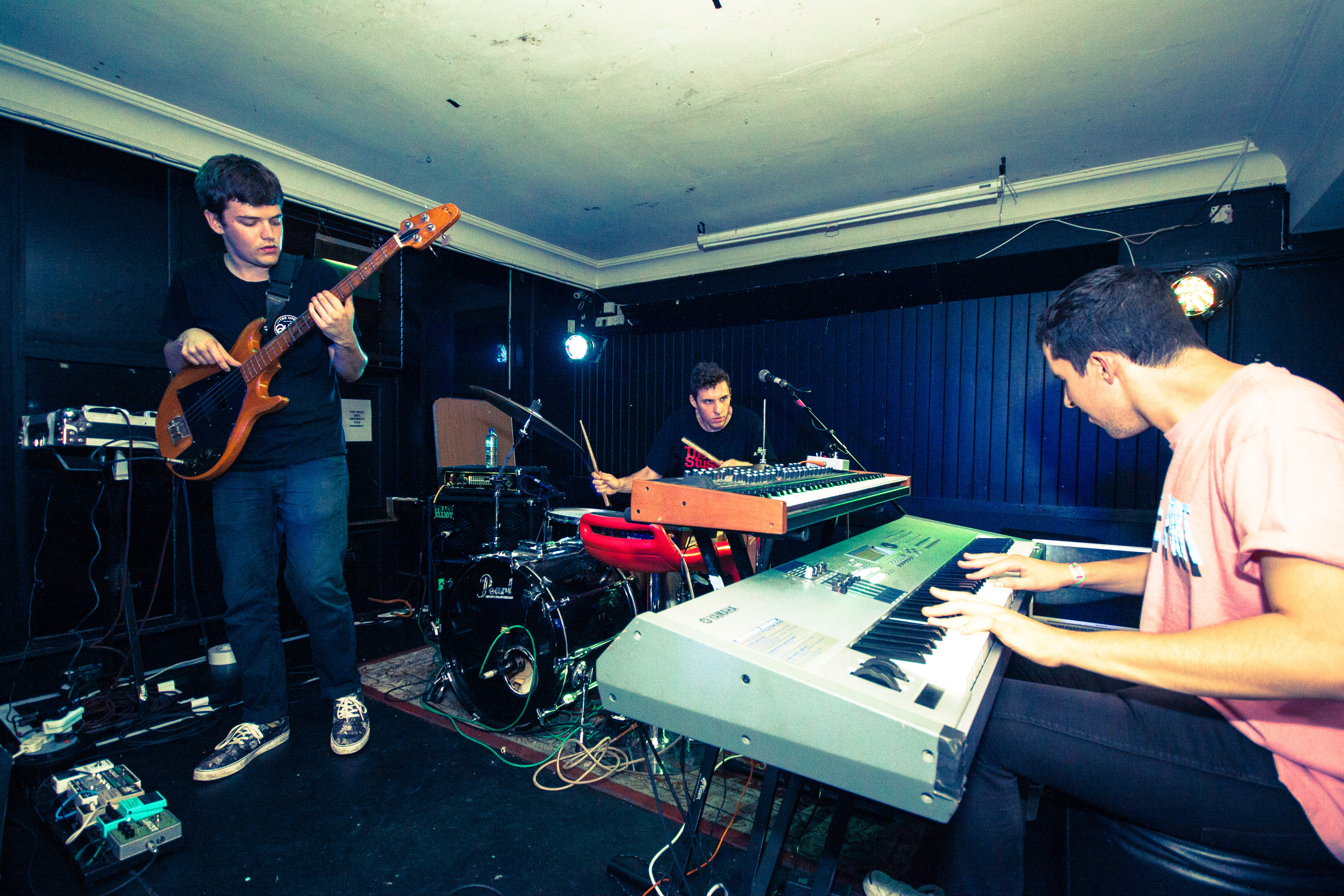
BadBadNotGood performing in 2014

Prior to the release of the album III, the first single "Hedron", became available on June 20, 2013, when it was featured on the compilation album Late Night Tales: Bonobo. BadBadNotGood assisted in production and musical composition for the soundtrack of The Man with the Iron Fists. On January 14, 2014, the second single from III was released titled "CS60". The third single, "Can't Leave The Night", was released on March 11, 2014, with the B-Side "Sustain" and would later feature in the third season opening episode of Better Call Saul. In March 2014, BBNG took part in SXSW for a second time and played a series of shows, including one with Tyler the Creator.

III was released on May 6, 2014, on CD, vinyl, and digital download, and was the group's first album of entirely original music. Following the release of the record, BBNG toured through the end of the year, first in Europe, then Canada and the US East Coast, ending their tour in December with a hometown show in Toronto.

The fourth album, Sour Soul, was released by Lex Records on Feb 24 2015 in collaboration with Ghostface Killah. Unlike their earlier works, it is more of a heavy hip hop album with light jazz accents. The group toured from April through October 2015, with Ghostface making a few appearances along the way. Leland Whitty joined the band unofficially at this time, with BBNG needing a fourth musician to play tracks from Sour Soul on the road, and continued to work with the group in the studio.

In December 2015, the band posted covers of some holiday classics on their YouTube channel, including a performance of "Christmas Time Is Here" in collaboration with Choir! Choir! Choir!. During this time, the group continued to song write with Frank Dukes and also began extensively collaborating with producer Kaytranada, with whom they wrote dozens of songs during this time. Additionally, they produced "Hoarse" on Odd Future member Earl Sweatshirt's studio debut, Doris, and "GUV'NOR", a remix on JJ Doom's Key to the Kuffs (Butter Edition).

=== 2016–2019: IV and production work ===
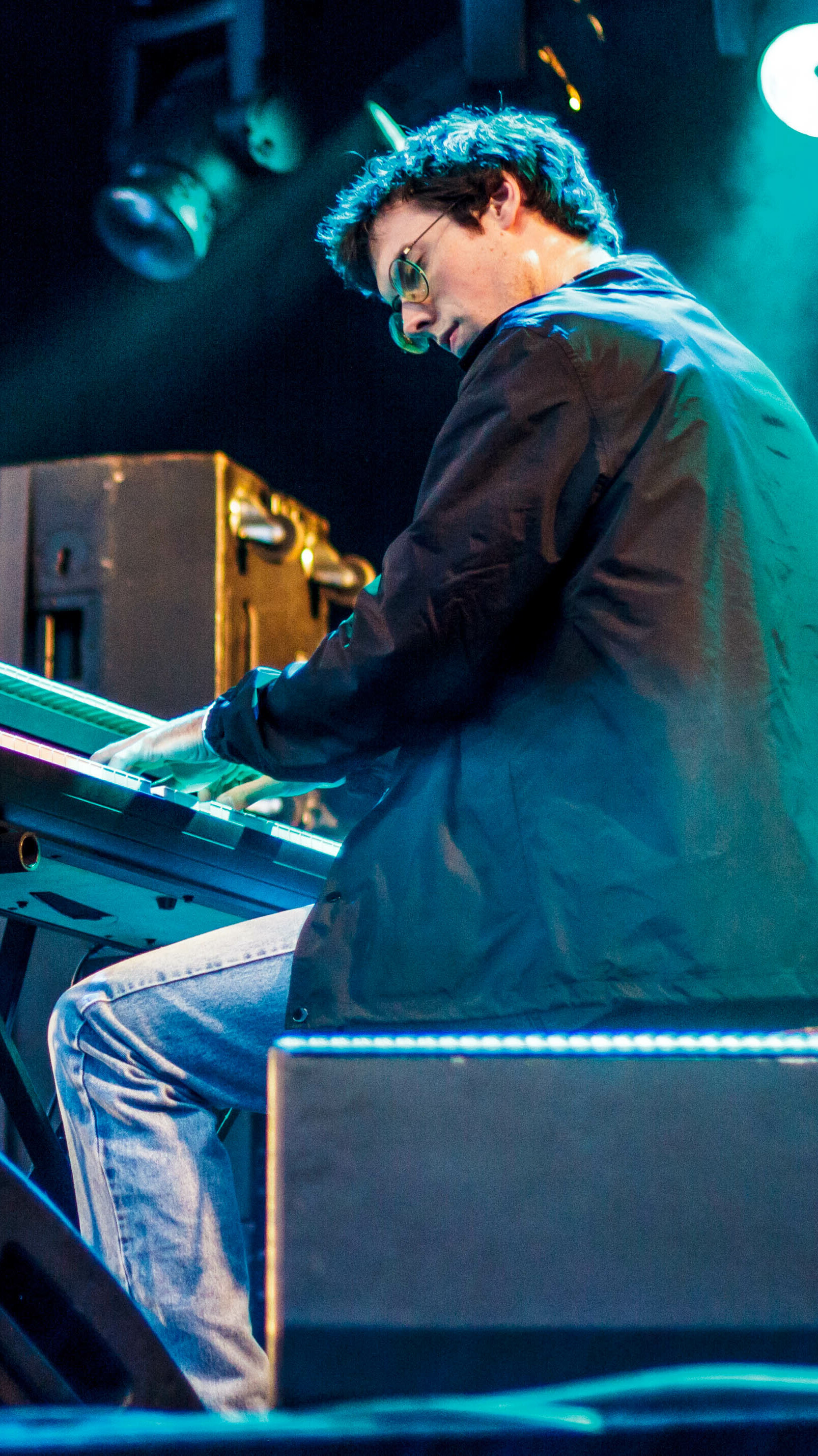
James Hill performing for BadBadNotGood as a touring member in 2017

Saxophonist Leland Whitty, a frequent collaborator of the group, joined the band on January 1, 2016. In April, BBNG took part in the Coachella Music Festival, making their first official appearance there.

Their fifth studio album, titled IV, was released by Innovative Leisure on July 8, 2016. It features several guest collaborations including Future Islands frontman Samuel T. Herring, saxophonist Colin Stetson, Kaytranada, hip hop artist Mick Jenkins, and singer-songwriter Charlotte Day Wilson. In December 2016, the album was picked as BBC Radio 6 Music's No. 1 album of the year. In the following two years, the group would release a series of unreleased tracks from their IV sessions as singles, namely collaborative songs with Colin Stetson, Sam Herring, and Little Dragon.

To support the release of IV, the band toured extensively for two years. This included festival and US club dates throughout Summer 2016, followed by European and Australian tours at the end of the year. In Fall 2016, jazz pianist James Hill joined the group on stage for the first time as a touring member. Hill, who knew Tavares from their time together at Humber College, filled in for Tavares, who stepped away from touring to focus on producing music as well as developing his solo project Matty. The group continued to tour throughout 2017 and into 2018, playing many more shows in North America, Europe, and Australia. In mid-2018, they toured Canada, before more US and European festival dates through November. For this work, the group was awarded the Libera Award for Best Live Act by the American Association of Independent Music in the following year; other nominees in the category included Run the Jewels and King Gizzard & the Lizard Wizard. Outside of a few one-off shows and a short Fall tour in South America and Asia, the band took a break from touring during 2019.

In 2018, the band served as the musical opener and instrumental backdrop to the Louis Vuitton Spring/Summer 2019 Collection runway show held in the gardens of the Palais Royal. Opening with a cover of Kanye West's "Ghost Town" from his 2018 album Ye and playing a variety of original work and covers for the remainder of the show. The band worked with Benji B and Virgil Abloh, both frequent collaborators with Kanye, to refine the creative direction of the music of the show.

During and following the production of IV, the members of BBNG took time to develop other musical projects together and bringing other artists into their Toronto studio to produce and record. This included artists like Kali Uchis and Mick Jenkins, as well as fellow Torontonians like Charlotte Day Wilson, Jaunt, and Jonah Yano. During this time, they also contributed two compositions of note for Kendrick Lamar-produced albums; the instrumentals for the track "Lust" on Damn (2017) and "The Ways" on Black Panther The Album (2018). Both albums received Grammy Award nominations for Album of the Year.

In October 2019, Matthew Tavares announced his departure from the band. He continues to collaborate with the group as a songwriter and contributor to side projects.

=== 2020–present: Collaborations, Talk Memory and Mid Spiral ===
In a February 2020 interview with Sowinski and Whitty regarding their collaborative film score for the indie thriller Disappearance at Clifton Hill, the two noted that BBNG was currently working on a new album, tentatively due later in 2020. Before the rescheduling and cancellation of live events in 2020, the band was planning to resume touring in April beginning with Coachella. In April 2020, BBNG released the single "Goodbye Blue" backed with "Glide (Goodbye Blue Pt. 2)," their first original release in almost two years.

To promote their new track "The Chocolate Conquistadors" with MF Doom for Grand Theft Auto Online, the group was interviewed on December 12, 2020, by Gilles Peterson on Worldwide FM during which Sowinski said, “we definitely will have a new album [in 2021], and that will be the first record in, like, five years... hopefully, that is what the music will represent, a path forward, and changing and growing – that's one record. We’re trying to finish two, I suppose." In July 2021, they once again inferred multiple albums were in the works via Twitter.

In June 2021, their track "Time Moves Slow" featuring Samuel T. Herring received renewed attention when it was sampled in "Running Away" by musician VANO 3000 in his viral Adult Swim trend on TikTok. With the band, VANO 3000 officially released the single on June 21, 2021, via Innovative Leisure; as of the release date, videos tagged with "#adultswim" have been viewed some 3.4 billion times.

In July 2021, the band announced their instrumental album Talk Memory via social media. The announcement approximately marks the five year anniversary of their last record, IV. To support the album ahead of the release, the band announced a limited zine series Memory Catalogue distributed via independent record stores and published sheet music for the lead single "Signal from the Noise" on their website. On July 15, 2021, they released the nine-minute single "Signal from the Noise", co-produced by Floating Points. On September 8, 2021, the band released "Beside April" as a second album single and announced touring dates in three legs: Canada in December 2021, the United States in March 2022, and Europe in Fall 2022. Talk Memory was well received by critics and is nominated for the 2022 Polaris Music Prize and the 2023 Juno Award for Jazz Album of the Year.

The band produced, arranged, and performed the sophomore album of collaborator Jonah Yano, Portrait of a Dog, released in January 2023. Following their 2021–2022 Talk Memory tour, the band took part in a Summer 2023 summer festival tour. On August 11, 2023, the band released the surprise collaborative EP New Heart Designs with hardcore band Turnstile, a reinterpretation of three tracks from their 2021 album Glow On. For this work, they were nominated for the 2024 Grammy Award for Best Remixed Recording, Non-Classical, their first nomination as the primary artist.

They produced the April 2024 EP Slow Burn with singer Baby Rose, including the single "One Last Dance."

In May 2024, they released the six-song Mid Spiral: Chaos on May 15, followed by six-song Mid Spiral: Order on May 22. A tweet from the band on 19 May said plainly: "Mid Spiral is not an ep 🌀", with an Instagram post officially confirming that these were two out of three "suites" that make up their sixth album Mid Spiral. The third suite, Mid Spiral: Growth released on May 29, and the full album, Mid Spiral released October 25, 2024.

== Style ==
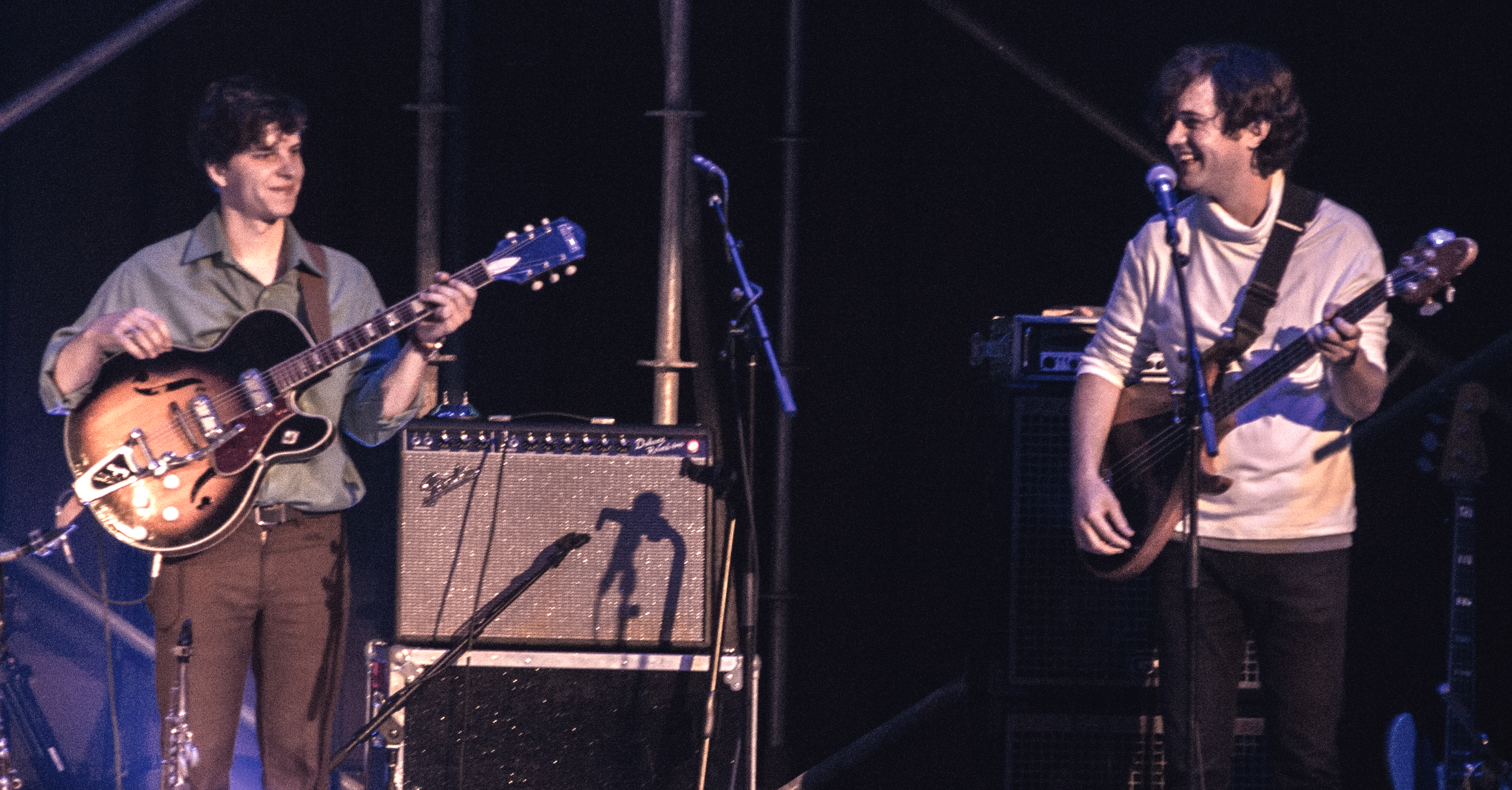
Whitty and Hansen at Massey Hall in 2017

Publications have often referred to the band's sound as a combination of jazz and hip hop (or jazz rap and instrumental hip hop). They have also been associated with the genres jazz fusion, alt-jazz, nu jazz, jazz-funk, free improvisation, cinematic jazz, and psychedelic jazz. In all, the band has generally eluded identification with one specific sound or movement, with Stereogum referring to them as "genre-fluid."

BBNG generally eschews being called a jazz band, acknowledging that their music contains elements of rock music, Brazilian music, electronic music, and soul music, and does not maintain jazz tradition, with Whitty commenting, "all we’re really trying to do is create something that's unique and honest to who we are... we don't really belong in any sort of box or are following any tradition or anything like that.” When asked in a 2016 interview about the group's relationship with jazz, Sowinski explained:

"We look at what we do as approaching music with jazz training. We use the jazz language when we’re writing, but we’re not proficient. We’re not the top musicians of the genre, so we don’t try to assume ourselves as prolific innovators because jazz has this history of boundary-pushing limitless constant progression, eight hours a day of practice. We’ve learned to find different interests—whether it’s production, recording techniques, writing, exploring totally different genres of music—instead of progressing our instruments per se as soloists. We listen to Coltrane and Sun Ra and all these progressives, but for us because of the internet and the age we’re a part of we love to study everything. It’s this weird ongoing thing for us to keep being educated and learning."

BBNG's relationship with the style is further complicated by the fact that the jazz community at large sees the group as outside of the genre but more mainstream music fans, those with less knowledge of the tradition and musicianship, perceive them to be jazz and representative of a bright future for the genre because of their accessibility. Ethnomusicologist Matthew Neil noted, “BBNG will continue to represent jazz, even as the jazz community, and even the group themselves, wish that they did not speak for jazz. Put simply: BBNG is jazz if people think they are.”

BBNG has cited a wide range of influences, including Brazilian composer Arthur Verocai, Miles Davis, saxophonists John Coltrane and Albert Ayler, Sam Rivers, drummers Tony Williams and Art Blakey, Sun Ra, producer J Dilla, Kurt Cobain, and Wu-Tang Clan.

== Reception ==
Early on, in 2012, a Prefix magazine review called BadBadNotGood "a jazz trio on paper -- but often strange, forever imaginative, and ultimately revolutionary hip-hop and electronic beatmakers at heart." NOW magazine lauded BadBadNotGood's "spastic, sonorous, genre-fucking rap covers." In describing BadBadNotGood's hip hop influences, the Huffington Post wrote that the group "deconstruct the four bar loops, understanding how to work crescendos by stretching out and reshaping the music into their own vision of silky smooth key progressions, pounding drums, and tasty bass lines."

Despite BBNG's rising popularity and press coverage by popular music media in the early 2010s, the band went unnoticed by the jazz community at large until after the release of their second album when off-the-cuff comments disregarding the jazz establishment were perceived as inflammatory by the jazz media. Critics quickly jumped to compare BBNG's musicianship to jazz artists that had achieved similar-sized audiences, not accounting for age or experience, and thus comparing them to musicians who had spent years developing their skills. In hindsight, the reactionary response was likely due to the fact that BBNG's popularity and success in popular music preceded any recognition or approval from the jazz community itself. The band was quick to walk back some of their comments and have been increasingly complimentary of their jazz contemporaries; in the following years, sentiments on both sides have relaxed and reversed. In a 2017 retrospective, JazzTimes responded positively to the album IV and their career journey thus far.

== Band members ==
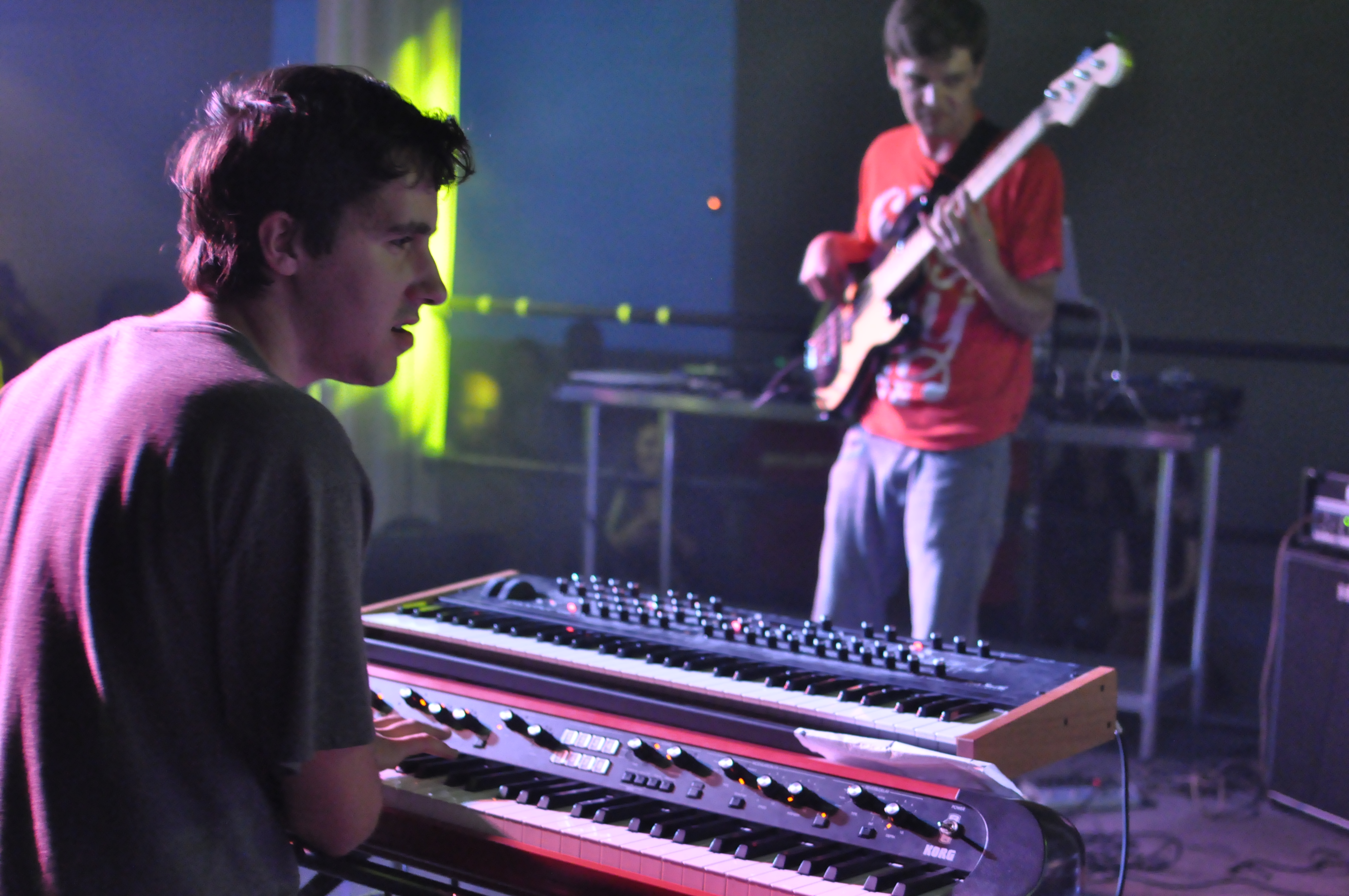
Matthew Tavares (left) and Chester Hansen in 2012

- Alexander Sowinski – drums, vibraphone, sampler (2010–present)
- Chester Hansen – bass guitar, upright bass, keyboards (2010–present)
- Leland Whitty – saxophone and woodwinds, guitars, violin and viola (2016–present; featured/touring 2011–2016)

Former member

- Matthew Tavares – keyboards, guitars (2010–2019; collaborator 2020–present)

Touring members

- James Hill – keyboards (2016–2020)
- Felix Fox – keyboards (2021–present)
- Felix Pastorius – bass guitar (2023–2024)
- Juan Carlos Medrano Magallanes – percussion (2023–present)
- Kae Murphy - trumpet, EVI (2023–present)

== Discography ==
- BBNG (2011)
- BBNG2 (2012)
- III (2014)
- Sour Soul (with Ghostface Killah) (2015)
- IV (2016)
- Talk Memory (2021)
- Mid Spiral (2024)

Production discography

Early in their career, BBNG helped produce two tracks for the soundtrack of The Man with the Iron Fists which were performed by Idle Warship and Wu-Tang Clan with Kool G Rap. This was followed by songs by Earl Sweatshirt, Danny Brown, and multiple tracks for Mick Jenkins, among others. In the late 2010s, BBNG coproduced songs for Freddie Gibbs, Kendrick Lamar ("LUST."), Daniel Caesar (including "Get You"), Kali Uchis including "After the Storm (feat. Tyler, the Creator and Bootsy Collins)," and Thundercat. In the producer role, BBNG often collaborates with fellow Canadian producers Frank Dukes and Kaytranada. More recently, BADBADNOTGOOD co-produced the EP Slow Burn (2024) with Baby Rose, including the title track "Slow Burn." In 2024, Spotify's editors named "One Last Dance" (Baby Rose & BADBADNOTGOOD) one of the Editors’ Picks: Best Songs of 2024.

== Awards and nominations ==
Grammy Awards

BadBadNotGood has been nominated for five Grammy Awards, winning two. Their first nomination as the primary artist was in 2024 for Best Remixed Recording, Non-Classical.

Year	Category	Nominated work	Result	Notes	Ref.
2018	Album of the Year	Damn (as a producer)	Nominated	Co-produced track "Lust" (Note: Per Grammy guidelines, all fully-credited producers of each track on an album are Grammy-eligible.)	
2018	Best Rap Album	Damn (as a producer)	Won	Co-produced track "Lust"	
2019	Album of the Year	Black Panther (as a producer)	Nominated	Co-produced track "The Ways"	
2021	Best Progressive R&B Album	It Is What It Is (as a producer)	Won	Co-produced track "King of the Hill"^{[a]}	
2024	Best Remixed Recording	"Alien Love Call" (as remixers)	Nominated	Original song by Turnstile feat. Blood Orange	

Polaris Music Prize

BadBadNotGood has been nominated for the Polaris Music Prize, Canada's most prestigious music, award four times.

Year	Association	Nominated work	Result	Ref.
2014	Polaris Music Prize	III	Longlisted	
2015	Polaris Music Prize	Sour Soul (with Ghostface Killah)	Shortlisted	
2017	Polaris Music Prize	IV	Shortlisted	
2022	Polaris Music Prize	Talk Memory	Longlisted	

Other awards

Year	Association	Category	Nominated work	Result	Notes	Ref.
2014	Worldwide Awards	Album of the Year	III	Nominated		
2016	Juno Awards	Rap Recording of the Year	Sour Soul	Nominated	With Ghostface Killah	
2016	Worldwide Awards	Album of the Year	IV	Nominated		
2016	SOCAN Songwriting Prize		"Paradise" (as a songwriter)	Nominated	Primary artist: Daniel Caesar	
2018	UK Music Video Awards	Best Alternative Video – Newcomer	"I Don't Know"	Won		
2018	SOCAN Awards	R&B Music	"Get You" (as a songwriter)	Won	Primary artist: Daniel Caesar	
2019	ASCAP Rhythm & Soul Awards	R&B/Hip-Hop Songs	"Get You" (as a songwriter)	Won	Primary artist: Daniel Caesar	
2019	Libera Awards	Best Live Act		Won		
2022	Libera Awards	Best Jazz Record	Talk Memory	Won		
2022	Libera Awards	Best Jazz Record	"Qadir" (BBNG Remix)	Nominated	Originally by Nick Hakim	
2022	Prism Prize	Best Music Video	"Love Proceeding"	Nominated		
2022	Prism Prize	Best Music Video	"Timid, Intimidating"	Nominated		
2023	Juno Awards	Jazz Album of the Year	Talk Memory	Nominated		
2023	Juno Awards	Traditional R&B/Soul Recording of the Year	"Please Do Not Lean"	Nominated	With Daniel Caesar	
