= Chester Hansen =

Canadian musician and songwriter (born 1992)

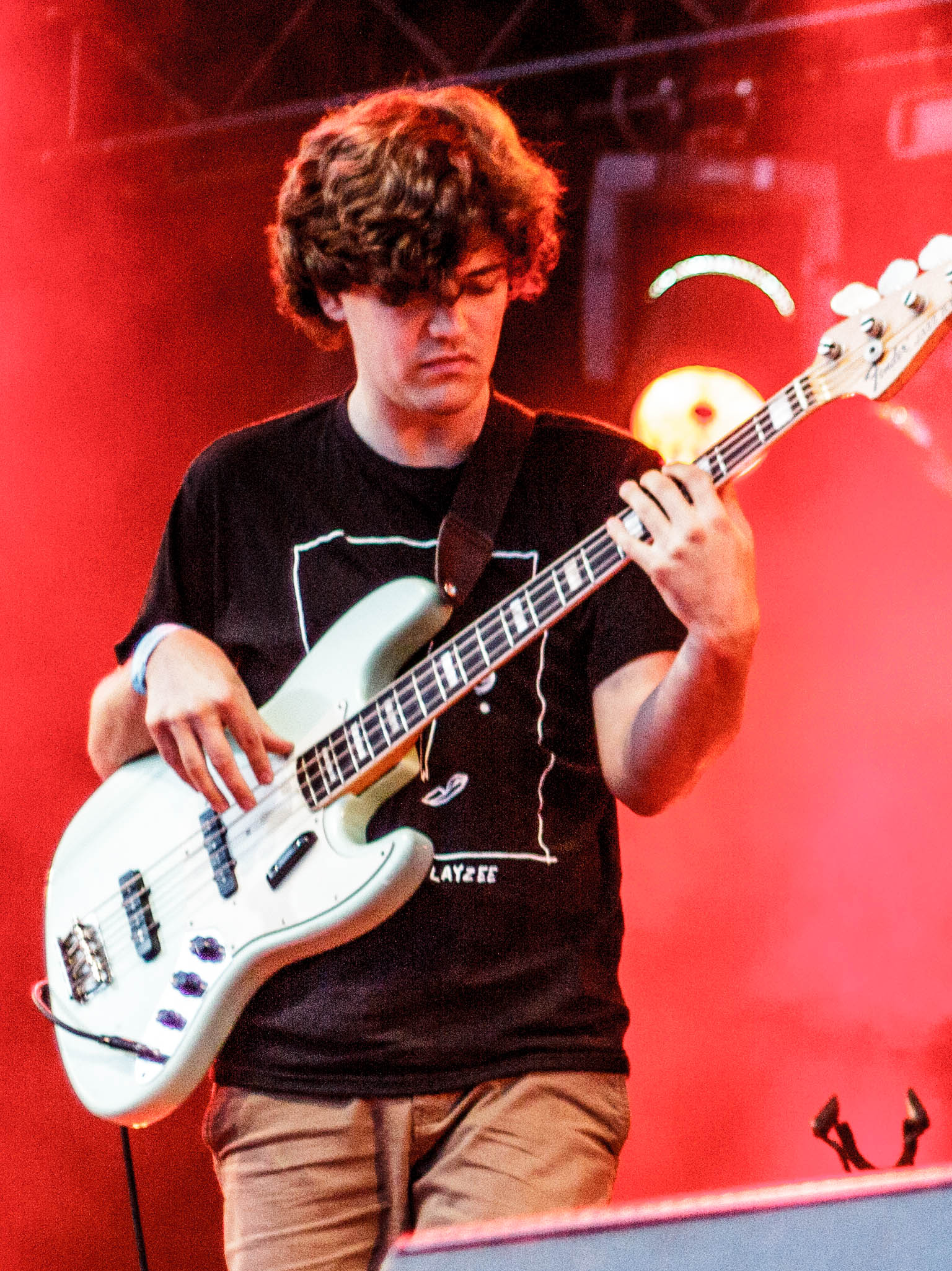
- Hansen at the 2017 Haldern Pop Festival

Background information
- Born: Chester Anton Mathias Hansen; May 1, 1992 (age 34); Ottawa, Ontario
- Origin: Toronto, Ontario
- Occupations: Musician; songwriter; producer
- Instruments: Bass guitar; upright bass; guitar; keyboards
- Years active: 2010–present
- Member of: BadBadNotGood

Chester Anton Mathias Hansen (born May 1, 1992) is a Canadian musician and songwriter, best known as bassist of instrumental group BADBADNOTGOOD. As a Grammy Award-winning songwriter, Hansen often works with his bandmates and producer Frank Dukes and is credited for co-writing hit songs by Drake, Kendrick Lamar, Daniel Caesar, and Kali Uchis, among others.

== Personal life and career ==
Hansen was born on May 1, 1992, in Ottawa, Ontario. He was raised in the Nepean area of the city and attended Canterbury High School, a local arts magnet school. Growing up, he played piano and shifted his focus to the bass during high school. Beginning in his teens, Hansen worked on and released music which combined hip-hop, jazz, and electronic influences.

In 2010, Hansen began attending Humber College in Toronto to study music performance. In his first year, he met fellow music students Alexander Sowinski and Matthew Tavares and began collaborating with them, creating what would become BADBADNOTGOOD. The band had viral success in 2011 after posting jazz covers of Odd Future songs online, and released their debut record that Fall. He withdrew from school in February 2012.

With BBNG, Hansen has released five full-length albums, including a collaborative record with Ghostface Killah, and has been short-listed for the Polaris Music Prize twice.

In the early 2010s, Hansen began working with close BBNG collaborator Frank Dukes. With him, as well as other members of BBNG, they composed original music for hip-hop music sampling. Of note, fellow Canadian Drake used a song Hansen had written with Dukes, "Vibez," in his 2014 single "0 to 100 / The Catch Up" and another track was used in Rihanna's 2016 song "Sex with Me." As part of BBNG, Hansen also works as a songwriter and producer, which includes writing music for sampling as well as working with fellow artists in the studio.

== Artistry ==
Hansen's style and sound is often compared to that of the 1960s and 1970s, particularly because of his stocky, warm bass tone. One critic commented, "Hansen has married the sounds and dexterous, melodic playing style of yesteryear with a modern band and music scene."

As a bassist, Hansen often plays a Gibson Grabber and a vintage Gibson SB-300. He employs a variety of basses in live settings including a Gallien-Krueger 800/700 RB (with an 8×10 GK cab), a Gallien-Krueger Fusion 500 (with a 4×10 Kicker CX cab), and a D’Angelico Excel SD. He has commented that he likes to use thick flat-wound strings far off of the neck.

Additionally, Hansen often plays keyboards on records. He has perfect pitch.

== Discography ==
With BADBADNOTGOOD

- BBNG (2011)
- BBNG2 (2012)
- III (2014)
- Sour Soul (with Ghostface Killah) (2015)
- IV (2016)
- Talk Memory (2021)

== Production and songwriting credits ==
Partial discography, adapted from SOCAN. Note, Hansen's work is sometimes incorrectly credited to C. John "Jack" Hansen, a producer notable for his work with Buddy Holly.

=== Production credits as part of BADBADNOTGOOD ===
Notable credits include,

- Kendrick Lamar: "Lust" from Damn (2016) (Certifications – US: gold)
- GoldLink: "Fall in Love" (featuring Cisero) (2016)
- Daniel Caesar: "Get You" (2016) (Certifications: US: 2× platinum; CAN: 2× Platinum; UK: silver)
- Kali Uchis: "After the Storm" (featuring Tyler, the Creator and Bootsy Collins) from Isolation (2018) (Certifications – US: gold)
- Khalid and Swae Lee: "The Ways" from Black Panther (2018)

=== Other credits ===
- The Living Sound System – Night of the Living Sound System (2011); keys
- Talib Kweli – "What's Real" (featuring RES) from Gravitas (2013) (uncredited) – with Frank Dukes
- Drake – "0 to 100 / The Catch Up " (2014) (samples "Vibez") (Certifications US: 2× platinum; UK: Silver) – with Frank Dukes
- Talib Kweli – "Arsenio Hall Show" (2014) – with Frank Dukes
- Yuna – "Broke Her" (2014) (samples "Vibez") – with Frank Dukes
- Fabolous – "Bish Bounce" from The Young OG Project (2014) – with Frank Dukes
- Wale – "The Helium Balloon" from The Album About Nothing (2015) – with Frank Dukes
- Logic – "Top Ten" feat. Big K.R.I.T. (2015) (samples "Vibez") – with Frank Dukes
- Mac Miller – "Perfect Circle / God Speed" from GO:OD AM (2015) (uncredited) – with Frank Dukes
- Kingsway Music Library – Colors (2015); bass, keys, vocals – with Frank Dukes
- Estan –The Vanity Of Reason (2015); bass
- Rihanna – "Sex with Me" from ANTi (2016) (Certifications – US: 2× platinum; UK: Silver) – with Frank Dukes
- TGOD Mafia – "Stay the Same" from Rude Awakening (2016) (samples "Vibez") – with Frank Dukes
- Lil Pump – "Flex Like Ouu" from Lil Pump (2017) (Certifications – US: gold) – with Frank Dukes
- Aminé – "Yellow" from Good for You (2017) – with Frank Dukes
- Saukrates – "The Grand Design" from Season 2 (2017) – with Frank Dukes
- Charlotte Day Wilson – "Doubt" (2017); writing, bass, guitar
- Charlotte Day Wilson – "Let You Down" and "Funeral" from Stone Woman EP (2018); bass
- Matty – Déjàvu (2018); bass, writing
- Wes Allen – Funny Thing EP (2018); producer, mixed, instrumentation
- Jerry Paper – Like A Baby (2018); bass
- Tropics – "Never Letting Go" and "Come Home" off Nocturnal Souls (2018); bass
- Matty – "Selfportrait" (2019); writing, bass
- Elijah Blake – "Half in Love" (2019); writing
- Safe – "No Rush" from Stay (2019); writing
- Doug Shorts – "Heads or Tails" from Casual Encounter (2019) – with Frank Dukes
- Antony Carle – "Cut in Line" from The Bitch of Living (2020); writing
- Ben L'Oncle Soul – "Next To You" feat. Yuna and "I Love This Game" from Addicted to You (2020); bass
- Beachtown Exile – Feeling Again (2020); mixing
- Steve Arrington – "Good Mood" from Down To The Lowest Terms: The Soul Sessions (2020); bass (prod. Jerry Paper)
- Rogê - "Pra Vida" (2022); bass
- JID - "Stars" (ft. Yasiin Bey) from The Forever Story (2022); writing

== Awards ==
As part of BADBADNOTGOOD

As producer and songwriter

Year	Association	Category	Nominated Work	Result	Note	Ref.
2015	Grammy Awards	Best Rap Song	"0 to 100 / The Catch Up" (Drake)	Nominated	With Frank Dukes, et al.	
2015	Grammy Awards	Best Rap Performance	"0 to 100 / The Catch Up" (Drake)	Nominated	With Frank Dukes, et al.	
2015	ASCAP Rhythm & Soul Award	R&B/Hip-Hop Songs	"0 to 100 / The Catch Up" (Drake)	Won	With Frank Dukes, et al.	
2016	SOCAN Songwriting Prize		"Paradise" (Daniel Caesar)	Nominated	With BBNG, et al.	
2018	ASCAP Rhythm & Soul Awards	R&B/Hip-Hop Songs	"Sex with Me" (Rihanna)	Won	With Frank Dukes, et al.	
2018	Grammy Awards	Album of the Year	Damn (Kendrick Lamar)	Nominated	With BBNG, et al.	
2018	Grammy Awards	Best Rap Album	Damn (Kendrick Lamar)	Won	With BBNG, et al.	
2018	SOCAN Awards	R&B Music	"Get You" (Daniel Caesar)	Won	With BBNG, et al.	
2019	ASCAP Rhythm & Soul Awards	R&B/Hip-Hop Songs	"Get You" (Daniel Caesar)	Won	With BBNG, et al.	
2019	Grammy Awards	Album of the Year	Black Panther: The Album	Nominated	With BBNG, et al.	
2021	Grammy Awards	Best Progressive R&B Album	It Is What It Is (Thundercat)	Won	With BBNG, et al.	
