= Leland Whitty =

Canadian instrumentalist

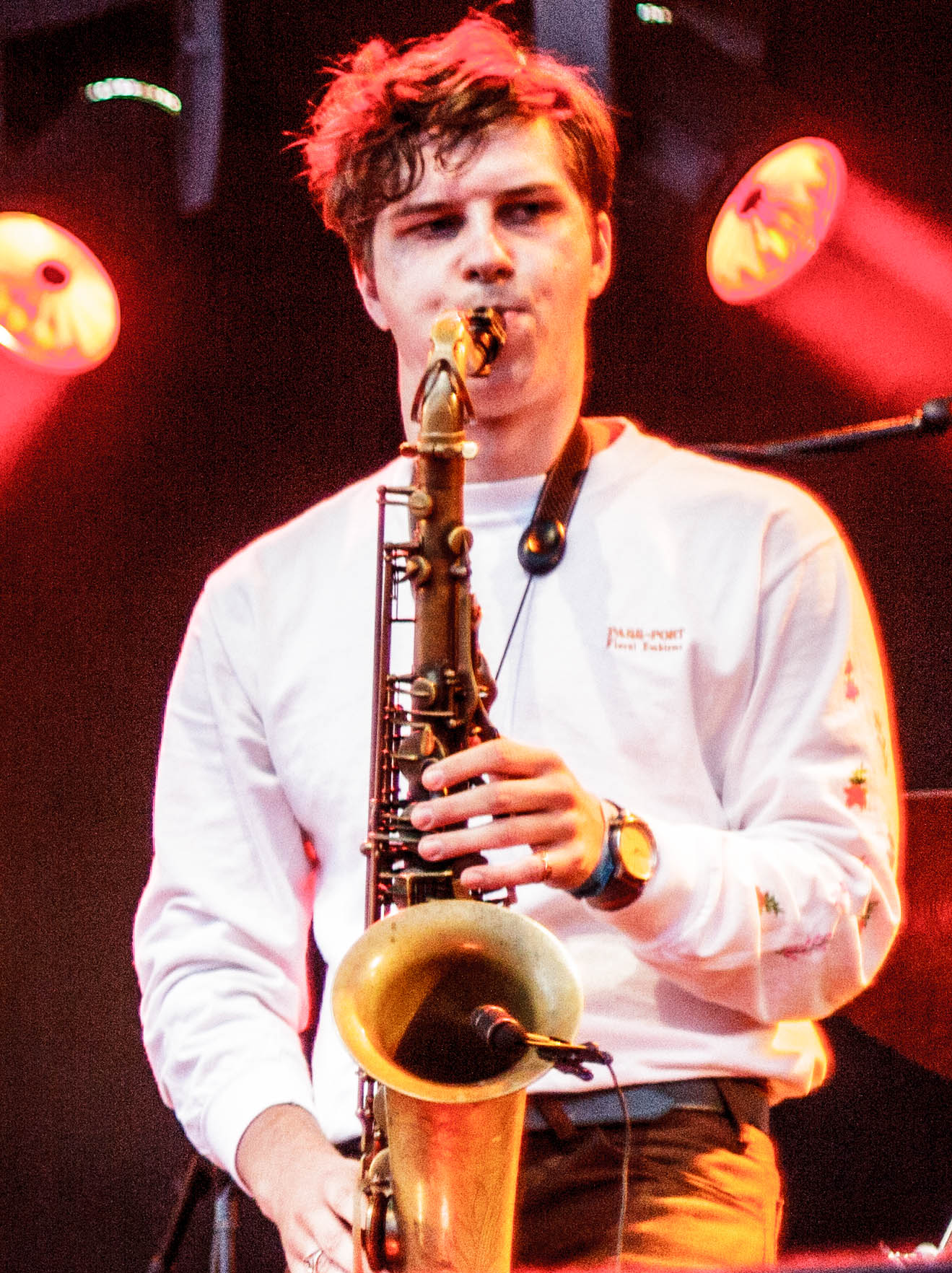
- Whitty at Haldern Pop Festival in 2017

Background information
- Born: May 20, 1993 (age 33); Toronto, Ontario
- Occupations: Musician; songwriter; producer
- Instruments: Saxophone; flute; clarinet; keyboards; guitar; bass; violin; viola
- Years active: 2010-present
- Member of: BadBadNotGood

Leland Whitty is a Canadian multi instrumentalist, most known primarily for being the saxophonist in the Canadian band BadBadNotGood. Like his bandmates, he has been credited with writing alongside several artists such as Kali Uchis, Drake, Kendrick Lamar and Daniel Caesar.

== Life and career ==
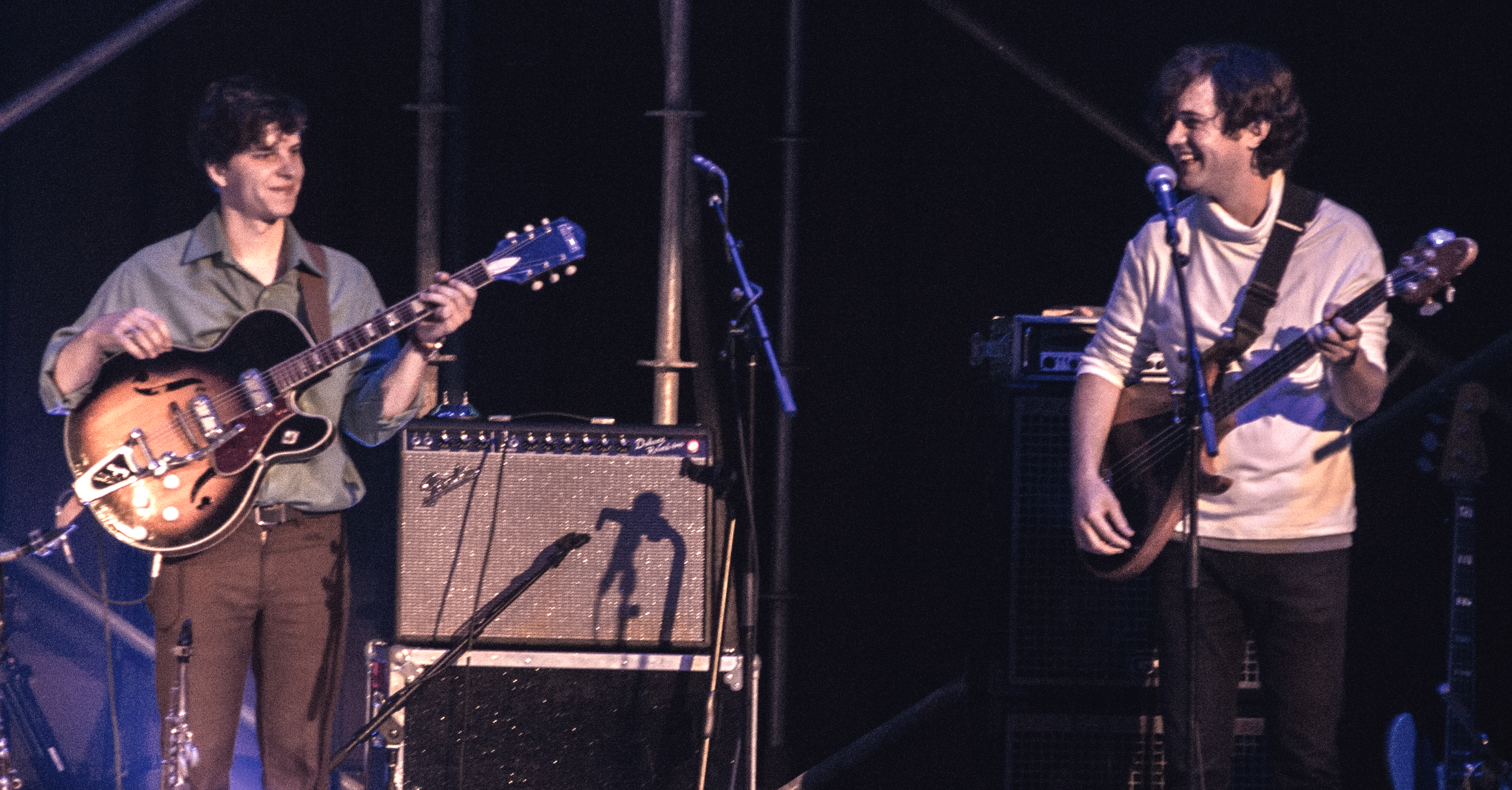
Leland Whitty and Chester Hansen at the Come Up Show in 2017

Leland was born and raised in Toronto, Canada. He comes from a family of musicians. His father, Brian Whitty, is a bassist, singer, and songwriter, and his mother is a pianist. Leland's brother is a drummer; he performed in Leland's solo album Anyhow (2022). Leland started playing the violin at 6 years old, and around 13 he began playing guitar. He attended Rosedale Heights School of the Arts hoping to become a better guitarist, but his teacher suggested playing the saxophone instead. When Leland was in High School he began rapping under the name "Chompy Lee," which later became the namesake of his band's song "Chompy's Paradise."

Leland attended Humber College where he met his future bandmates Alexander Sowinski, Chester Hansen, and Matthew Tavares. Prior to joining BadBadNotGood, Whitty played with bands like the Tesseract.

He would go on to play in their second album BBNG2 on two tracks. Whitty joined in several of their live shows but would officially join the band in 2016. His first album within the band was IV.

In 2019, he collaborated with band member Alexander Sowinski in composing the soundtrack of the Canadian Thriller movie Disappearance at Clifton Hill, marking his first ever score. He composed a soundtrack for the short film Lost Keys in 2021.

He has collaborated with former member Matthew Tavares, on a live and studio, January 12th and Visions. January 12th was a fully improvised live album filmed at the Burdock Brewery alongside Matthew Tavares, the album was supposed to be released right before their tour of their upcoming studio album Visions but was cancelled due to the COVID-19 pandemic.

Following that, he released his debut album Anyhow in 2022 featuring his older brother Lowell alongside guest appearances by his bandmates Chester Hansen and Alexander Sowinski.

== Artistry ==
Whitty has been musically inspired by several jazz and hip hop musicians such as John Coltrane, Miles Davis, J Dilla, and Wu-Tang Clan in his composition. In his solo work he is described to be influenced by his collaborator Arthur Verocai, David Axelrod, and Wayne Shorter. His string arrangements are described to be reminiscent of John Luther Adams and Jonny Greenwood.

== Discography ==
With BADBADNOTGOOD

- BBNG2 (2012)
- III (2014)
- Sour Soul (2015) (with Ghostface Killah)
- IV (2016)
- Talk Memory (2021)
- January 12th (2020) (with Matthew Tavares)
- Visions (2020) (with Matthew Tavares)

Other albums

- Disappearance at Clifton Hill soundtrack (2019) (with Alexander Sowinski)
- Lost Keys (short film; dir. Amandla Baraka) (2021) (with Alexander Sowinski )
- Anyhow (2022) (guest appearances of Alexander Sowinski and Chester Hansen)
