= Charlotte Day Wilson =

Canadian singer-songwriter (born 1993)

- Born: April 17, 1993 (age 33); Toronto, Ontario, Canada
- Genres: R&B; pop; soul
- Occupations: Singer, songwriter
- Instruments: Vocals; saxophone; keyboards; drums
- Years active: 2012–present
- Labels: Stone Woman Music; XL
- Website: charlottedaywilson.com

Charlotte Day Wilson (born April 17, 1993) is a Canadian contemporary R&B singer-songwriter. She came to prominence in the mid-2010s with her single "Work" and collaborations with other Toronto-based artists like BadBadNotGood and Daniel Caesar. Wilson released her debut album Alpha in July 2021.

== Life and career ==
A native of Toronto, Ontario, Wilson studied classical piano in childhood before teaching herself production via GarageBand as a teenager. She moved to Halifax, Nova Scotia to study music at university, but left school to focus on her music career.

She self-released the EP Palimpsest in 2012, and followed up with the standalone singles "Avondale," "Stephen," and "Montreal" in 2013 and 2014. She was also part of the funk band The Wayo, which released an EP in 2014, among other releases. She contributed vocals, keys, and saxophone.

She spent some time living in Montreal, Quebec, before returning to Toronto and interning at Arts & Crafts Productions. There, Wilson began collaborating with artists such as Daniel Caesar, River Tiber, and BadBadNotGood before releasing her second EP, CDW, in 2016.

The EP's song "Work" was nominated for the SOCAN Songwriting Prize in 2017, the EP was a longlisted nominee for the 2017 Polaris Music Prize; additionally, producer Howie Beck received a Juno Award nomination for Producer of the Year at the Juno Awards of 2017 for his contributions to "Work" and Dragonette's "High Five". Wilson's video for "Work", directed by Fantavious Fritz, won the 2018 Prism Prize. Wilson and Fritz subsequently announced that they were using the prize money to create a special grant program for emerging female video directors.

Her third EP, Stone Woman, was released in 2018. The song "Falling Apart" from that album was sampled on the 2020 James Blake track "I Keep Calling." In 2018, Vinyl Me, Please released an exclusive album that compiled CDW and Stone Woman.

In 2021, she was nominated for the Juno Award for Traditional R&B/Soul Recording of the Year for her single "Take Care of You" featuring Syd.

In May 2025 she opened Tutto Panino, a panini shop, in the Roncesvalles neighbourhood of Toronto.

Wilson identifies as queer.

=== Alpha ===
Following a May 2021 announcement, Wilson released her debut album Alpha on July 9, 2021 to favorable reviews. Written and produced by Wilson, the album features a number of tracks co-written and produced with Toronto songwriter Jack Rochon (Jack Ro) in addition to contributions from other Toronto acts like Daniel Caesar, BadBadNotGood, Mustafa, and Merna Bishouty. Other producers include retro soul artist Thomas Brenneck, R&B producer D'Mile in collaboration with Babyface, Dylan Wiggins (Sir Dylan), and Teo Halm.

At the 2022 Juno Awards, she was nominated for Songwriter of the Year, Producer of the Year, and Traditional R&B/Soul Recording of the Year.

=== Cyan Blue ===
Wilson's second album Cyan Blue was released on May 3, 2024, under the label XL Recordings to favorable reviews. Ammar Kalia from The Guardian said of the album "Wilson finds new confidence, breaking out of the Toronto scene with a record of immense feeling and depth." Jesse Zapatero wrote "…Cyan Blue is a testament to Charlotte Day Wilson's growth as an artist. It's a richly woozy, sensual, and insightful exploration of relationships, and it firmly establishes her as a unique voice in contemporary music."

The album was nominated for the 67th Annual Grammy Awards in the category of Best Engineered Album, Non-Classical, with nominations going to Jack Emblem, Jack Rochon & Charlotte Day Wilson as engineers and Chris Gehringer as mastering engineer.

=== Patchwork ===
Patchwork was longlisted for the 2026 Polaris Music Prize, and the song "Lean", a collaboration with Saya Gray, was shortlisted for the 2026 SOCAN Polaris Song Prize.

== Discography ==
=== Albums ===
Studio albums, with details
Title	Details
Alpha	Released: July 9, 2021; Label: Stone Woman Music
Cyan Blue	Released: May 3, 2024; Label: Stone Woman Music, XL
Patchwork	Released: February 6, 2026; Label: Stone Woman Music, XL

EPs, with details
Title	Details
Palimpsest	Released: November 1, 2012; Format: digital
CDW	Released: August 28, 2016; Label: Stone Woman Music; Format: 10", CD, digital
Stone Woman	Released: February 23, 2018; Label: Stone Woman Music; Format: 10", CD, digital

=== Singles ===
Title	Year	Album	Certifications
"Avondale"	2013	Non-album singles	
"Stephen"	2014	Non-album singles	
"Montreal"	2014	Non-album singles	
"Work"	2016	CDW	MC: Gold
"After All"	2016	CDW	
"Find You"	2016	CDW	
"Doubt"	2018	Stone Woman	
"Nothing New"	2019	Stone Woman	
"Mountains"	2019	Alpha	
"Take Care of You / Summertime" (feat. Syd)	2020	Alpha	
"If I Could"	2021	Alpha	
"Keep Moving"	2021	Alpha	
"I Can Only Whisper" (feat. BADBADNOTGOOD)	2021	Alpha	
"Forever" (feat. Snoh Aalegra)	2023	Cyan Blue	
"Sleeper" (feat. BADBADNOTGOOD)	2023	Non-album single	
"I Don't Love You"	2024	Cyan Blue	
"Canopy"	2024	Cyan Blue	
"My Way/Cyan Blue"	2024	Cyan Blue	
"Lean"	2026	Patchwork	

=== As guest artist ===
- Harley Alexander – "Runnin' Thangz" from Gold Shirt (2015)
- froyo ma – "Spent Missing" from Pants EP (2015)
- Iglooghost – "Gold Tea" from Little Grids (2016)
- BADBADNOTGOOD – "In Your Eyes" from IV (2016)
- Daniel Caesar – "Transform" from Freudian (2017)
- A l l i e – "Take Me There" from Nightshade (2017)
- Local Natives – "Dark Days - Live at ACL" from Dark Days (Remixes) EP (2017)
- DJDS – "No Pain" with Khalid and Charlie Wilson from Big Wave More Fire (2018)
- KAYTRANADA – "What You Need" and "Freefall" from Bubba (2019) (writing credit only)
- Loyle Carner – "Sail Away Freestyle" from Not Waving, but Drowning (2019)
- James Blake – "I Keep Calling" from Before EP (2020) (sampled artist)
- Drake – "Fair Trade" with Travis Scott from Certified Lover Boy (2021) (sampled artist)
- SG Lewis – "Fever Dreamer" (feat. Charlotte Day Wilson & Channel Tres) from AudioLust & HigherLove (2023)
- Lil Silva – "Leave It" from Yesterday Is Heavy (2023)
- KAYTRANADA – "Still" from Timeless (2024)
- Nelly Furtado – "All Comes Back" from 7 (2024)

== Awards and nominations ==
Year	Ceremony	Award	Nominated work	Result
2017	Polaris Music Prize	2017 Polaris Music Prize	CDW	Longlisted
2017	SOCAN Songwriting Prize		"Work"	Nominated
2018	Prism Prize		"Work"	Won
2021	Juno Awards	Traditional R&B/Soul Recording of the Year	"Take Care of You"	Nominated
2022	Juno Awards	Songwriter of the Year	Herself	Nominated
2022	Juno Awards	Producer of the Year	Herself	Nominated
2022	Juno Awards	Traditional R&B/Soul Recording of the Year	Alpha	Nominated
2022	Libera Awards	Best R&B Record	Alpha	Nominated
2022	Polaris Music Prize		Alpha	Shortlisted
2025	Grammy Awards	Best Engineered Album, Non-Classical	Cyan Blue	Nominated
2026	Polaris Music Prize	2026 Polaris Music Prize, Albums	Patchwork	Longlisted
