= Future Islands discography =

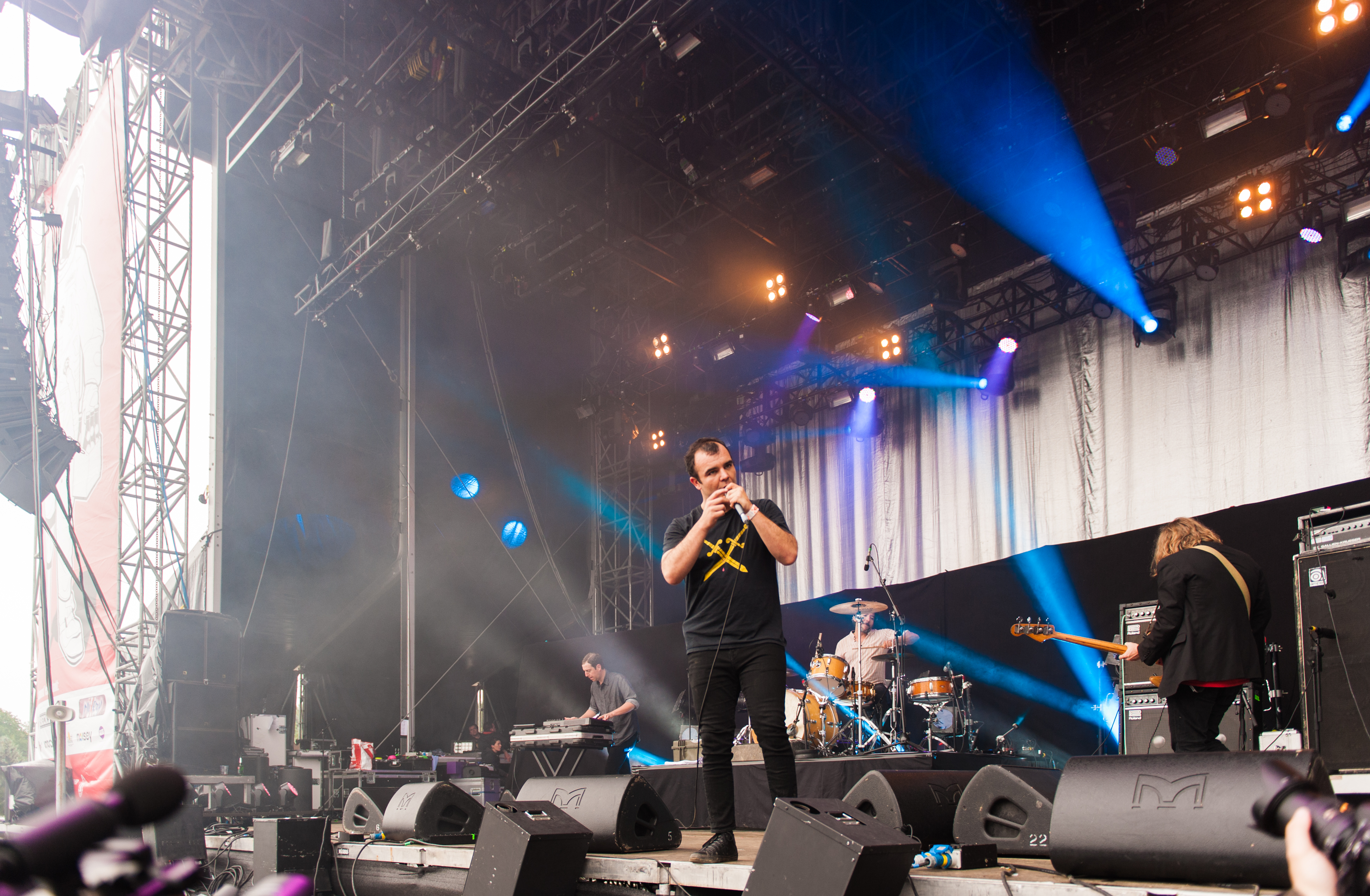
- Future Islands in 2015
- Studio albums: 7
- EPs: 6
- Compilation albums: 1
- Singles: 38
- Remixes: 3
- Music videos: 16

American synthpop band Future Islands have released seven studio albums, six extended plays (EPs), 23 singles and 15 music videos. Future Islands was formed in Greenville, North Carolina in 2006 but relocated to Baltimore, Maryland in 2008. It consists of John Gerrit Welmers (keyboards), Michael Lowry (percussion), William H. Cashion (bass guitar), and Samuel T. Herring (vocals). The band included Erick Murillo (drums) up until November 2007.

== Albums ==
=== Studio albums ===
List of studio albums, with selected peak chart positions and certifications
Title	Details	Peak chart positions										Certifications
Title	Details	US	BEL (FL)	BEL (WA)	GER	IRE	POR	SCO	SPA	SWI	UK	Certifications
Wave Like Home	Released on August 25, 2008; Label: Upset! the Rhythm (UK)	—	—	—	—	—	—	—	—	—	—	
In Evening Air	Released on May 4, 2010; Label: Thrill Jockey	—	—	—	—	—	—	—	—	—	—	
On the Water	Released: October 11, 2011; Label: Thrill Jockey	— (Note: On the Water did not enter the Billboard 200, but peaked at number 12 on the US Heatseekers chart.)	—	—	—	—	—	—	—	—	—	
Singles	Released: March 24, 2014; Label: 4AD	40	51	—	—	49	—	26	—	—	36	BPI: Gold
The Far Field	Released: April 7, 2017; Label: 4AD	52	31	102	74	11	21	9	37	38	18	
As Long as You Are	Released: October 9, 2020; Label: 4AD	108	105	178	44	35	11	9	76	74	22	
People Who Aren't There Anymore	Released: January 26, 2024; Label: 4AD	— (Note: People Who Aren't There Anymore did not enter the Billboard 200, but peaked at number 10 on the US Top Album Sales chart.)	141	—	95	—	33	6	— (Note: People Who Aren't There Anymore did not enter the Spanish Top 100 Albums chart but peaked on the Spanish Top 100 Vinyl Albums chart at number 18.)	73	7	
"—" denotes a recording that did not chart or was not released in that territory.

=== Compilation albums ===
List of compilation albums, with selected peak chart positions and certifications
Title	Details	Peak chart positions			
Title	Details	SCO	SWI	UK Sales	UK Indie
From a Hole in the Floor to a Fountain of Youth	Released: May 22, 2026; Label: 4AD; Formats: CD, LP	26	100	28	13

== Extended plays ==
List of EPs, with selected details
Title	Details	Additional personnel
Little Advances	Released: April 28, 2006; Label: self-released; Recorded in March 2006; Produced by Chester Endersby Gwazda; Artwork by Future Islands	
Split EP with Moss of Aura	Released: January 6, 2007; Label: self-released; Recorded in December 2006; Produced by Chester Endersby Gwazda	
Split EP with Dan Deacon	Released: August 5, 2008; Label: 307 Knox Records; Cover photo by Sam Herring	
Post Office Wave Chapel	Released: February 2010; Label: Free Danger; Artwork by Future Islands	Remixes by: Pictureplane "Old Dreamer"; Javelin "Flicker & Flutter"; Jones "Little Dreamer"; Moss of Aura "Beach Foam"
In the Fall	Released: April 2010; Label: Thrill Jockey; Produced by Chester Endersby Gwazda; Mastered by Rob Girardi; Artwork by Post Typography (Bruce Willen)	Denny Bowen (drums, percussion); Katrina Ford (additional vocals); Owen Gardner (cello)
Undressed	Released: September 2010; Label: Thrill Jockey; Recorded on July 7, 2010, Mobtown Studios, Baltimore, Maryland; Produced by Mat Leffler-Schulman; Artwork by Kymia Nawabi	Kate Barutha (cello); Devlin Rice (acoustic guitar); Denny Bowen (drums)

== Singles ==
=== As lead artist ===
List of singles, with selected peak chart positions and certifications
Title	Year	Peak chart positions										Certifications	Album
Title	Year	US AAA	US Alt.	US Rock	AUS Hit	BEL (FL)	CAN Rock	MEX Air.	SWI Air	UK Sales	UK Indie	Certifications	Album
"Follow You"	2006	—	—	—	—	—	—	—	—	—	—		Little Advances (EP)
"Pinnochio" / "The Happiness of Being Twice"	2007	—	—	—	—	—	—	—	—	— (Note: Feathers & Hallways did not enter the UK Singles Chart, but peaked at number 30 on the UK Physical Singles Chart.)	—		Feathers & Hallways
"Walking Through That Door"	2009	—	—	—	—	—	—	—	—	—	—		In Evening Air
"Long Flight"	2009	—	—	—	—	—	—	—	—	—	—		In Evening Air
"Tin Man"	2009	—	—	—	—	—	—	—	—	— (Note: "Tin Man" did not enter the UK Singles Chart, but peaked at number 10 on the UK Physical Singles Chart.)	—		In Evening Air
"Before the Bridge"	2011	—	—	—	—	—	—	—	—	— (Note: "Before the Bridge" did not enter the UK Singles Chart, but peaked at number 61 on the UK Physical Singles Chart.)	—		On the Water
"Grease"	2011	—	—	—	—	—	—	—	—	—	—		On the Water
"Balance"	2011	—	—	—	—	—	—	—	—	—	—		On the Water
"Close to None"	2012	—	—	—	—	—	—	—	—	—	—		On the Water
"Tomorrow" / "The Fountain"	2012	—	—	—	—	—	—	—	—	—	—		Non-album single
"Seasons (Waiting on You)" (Original or BadBadNotGood Reinterpretation)	2014	27	37	50	13	50	32	—	—	39	22	RIAA: Gold; BPI: Silver; MC: Gold	Singles
"A Dream of You and Me"	2014	—	—	—	—	—	—	—	—	—	—		Singles
"Spirit"	2014	—	—	—	—	—	—	—	—	—	—		Singles
"Doves" (Vince Clarke Remix)	2014	—	—	—	—	—	—	—	—	—	—		Non-album single
"Light House"	2015	—	—	—	—	—	—	—	—	—	—		Singles
"A Song for Our Grandfathers"	2015	—	—	—	—	—	—	—	—	—	—		Singles
"The Chase" / "Haunted by You"	2015	—	—	—	—	—	—	—	—	— (Note: "The Chase" did not enter the UK Singles Chart, but peaked at number 10 on the UK Physical Singles Chart.)	—		Non-album single
"Ran"	2017	19	—	49	—	— (Note: "Ran" did not enter the Flanders Ultratop Top 50, but peaked at 30 on the Flanders Ultratip chart.)	—	41	—	—	—		The Far Field
"Cave"	2017	—	—	—	—	—	—	—	—	—	—		The Far Field
"Calliope"	2018	—	—	—	—	—	—	—	—	—	—		Non-album single
"For Sure" (Original or Dan Deacon Remix)	2020	12	—	—	—	— (Note: "For Sure" did not enter the Flanders Ultratop Top 50, but charted as an extra tip on the Flanders Ultratop Bubbling Under chart.)	—	25	91	—	—		As Long as You Are
"Thrill"	2020	—	—	—	—	—	—	—	—	—	—		As Long as You Are
"Moonlight"	2020	—	—	—	—	—	—	—	—	—	—		As Long as You Are
"Plastic Beach"	2021	23	—	—	—	—	—	—	—	—	—		As Long as You Are
"The Moon Is Blue"	2021	—	—	—	—	—	—	—	—	—	—		Non-album single
"Peach"	2021	—	—	—	—	—	—	—	—	—	—		People Who Aren't There Anymore
"King of Sweden"	2022	—	—	—	—	—	—	—	—	—	—		People Who Aren't There Anymore
"Deep in the Night"	2023	—	—	—	—	—	—	—	—	—	—		People Who Aren't There Anymore
"The Tower"	2023	3	33	— (Note: "The Tower" did not enter the Hot Rock & Alternative Songs chart, but peaked at number 26 on the Rock Airplay chart.)	—	—	—	—	—	—			People Who Aren't There Anymore
"The Fight"	2023	—	—	—	—	—	—	—	—	—	—		People Who Aren't There Anymore
"Say Goodbye"	2024	—	—	—	—	—	—	—	—	—	—		People Who Aren't There Anymore
"Glimpse" (Note: "Glimpse" was originally announced as a standalone single, but was later included as the closing track on From a Hole in the Floor to a Fountain of Youth.)	2024	—	—	—	—	—	—	—	—	—	—		From a Hole in the Floor to a Fountain of Youth
"Sail" / "Find Love"	2026	—	—	—	—	—	—	—	—	—	—		From a Hole in the Floor to a Fountain of Youth
"One Day" / "The Ink Well"	2026	—	—	—	—	—	—	—	—	—	—		From a Hole in the Floor to a Fountain of Youth
"—" denotes a recording that did not chart or was not released in that territory.

=== Split singles ===
Title	Year	Other artist(s)
"The Ink Well" / "Love Torn"	2010	Lonnie Walker
"Cotton Flower" / "Blue Stamped Britches" / "Beautiful Transvestite"	2012	Ed Schrader's Music Beat

== Remixes ==
List of remixes by Future Islands for other artists, showing year released
Title	Year	Artist
"Overdose"	2014	Little Daylight
"Black Out Days"	2014	Phantogram
"Despicable Animal"	2015	Wye Oak (with Moss of Aura)

== Music videos ==
Year	Title	Director
2007	"Follow You" (Pangea Version)	Allen Cordell
2008	"Beach Foam"	Joe Stakun
2009	"The Happiness of Being Twice"	Joel Fernando
2010	"Tin Man"	Jay Buim
2010	"As I Fall"	Mary Helena Clark
2010	"In Evening Air"	Jay Buim
2010	"The Ink Well"	Theo Anthony
2011	"Before The Bridge"	Abram Sanders
2011	"Balance"	Jay Buim
2012	"Give Us the Wind"	Mike Anderson
2012	"Grease"	Jay Buim
2013	"Walking Through That Door"	Kymia Nawabi
2014	"Seasons (Waiting on You)"	Jay Buim
2014	"A Dream of You and Me"	Elena Johnston & William Cashion
2015	"Song for Our Grandfathers"	Jay Buim
2017	"Ran"	Albert Birney
2017	"Cave"	Jay Buim
2017	"Beauty Of The Road"	Jay Buim
2020	"For Sure"	Samuel Jerome Mason
2020	"Thrill"	Samuel Herring
2020	"Moonlight"	Will Mayer

== Song usage in media ==
List of Future Islands songs featured on various productions
Song	Where	When	Type
"Seasons (Waiting on You)" (Singles)	Uncle (British TV series) Season 2, episode 3	February 2015	Television
"Vireo's Eye" (In Evening Air)	Shameless episode 3	2011	Television
"Inch of Dust" (In Evening Air)	Shameless episode 7	2011	Television
"Swept Inside" (In Evening Air)	Fear the Walking Dead ep. 12, season 2 (AMC)	September 18, 2016	Television
"Seasons (Waiting on You)" (Singles)	Mark McMorris Infinite Air	October 2016	Video game
"Day Glow Fire" (The Far Field)	NHL 18	September 2017	Video game
"Beauty of the Road" (The Far Field)	Gran Turismo Sport	October 2017	Video game
"Light House" (Singles)	Titane	July 2021	Film
"For Sure" (As Long As You Are)	Nine Perfect Strangers season 1 episode 3	2021	Television
"Shadows" (The Far Field)	Ted Lasso season 3 episode 12	2023	Television

== Cover songs ==
- "Last Christmas" by Wham! (2015)
