= Time Moves Slow and Running Away =

2016 single by BadBadNotGood

"Time Moves Slow"

Single by BadBadNotGood featuring Samuel T. Herring

from the album IV
- Released: May 17, 2016
- Genre: R&B; soul; blue-eyed soul
- Length: 4:32
- Label: Innovative Leisure
- Songwriters: Alexander Sowinski; Chester Hansen; Leland Whitty; Matthew Tavares; Samuel T. Herring
- Producer: BadBadNotGood

BadBadNotGood featuring Samuel T. Herring singles chronology
"Speaking Gently" (2016)	"Time Moves Slow" (2016)	"Confessions Pt. II" (2016)

"Time Moves Slow" is a song by Canadian instrumental group BADBADNOTGOOD and American singer Samuel T. Herring, from the former's album IV. The track was released on May 17, 2016, as the second single from the album to critical and commercial acclaim.

In June 2021, a song called "Running Away" by VANO 3000 heavily sampled the track, causing both it and "Time Moves Slow" to go viral on TikTok. It was officially released with the band on June 21, 2021.

== Background and release ==
The band first connected with Future Islands frontman Samuel T. Herring in 2014 when they remixed/reinterpreted their track "Seasons (Waiting on You)". Following their collaboration, BadBadNotGood invited Herring to their Toronto studio to work on some music for their album. From these sessions, they wrote and recorded "Time Moves Slow" as well as the non-album single "I Don't Know".

"Time Moves Slow" premiered live in 2015 at a Red Bull show in Los Angeles; the band played the track as well as their version of "Seasons (Waiting on You)" with Herring .

The track debuted on Zane Lowe's Beats 1 radio show on May 17, 2016, and released digitally the same day. The band announced their new album the same day. The track was also released as a promotional single. The track was reviewed positively in reviews of the album.

Since its release, the track has been performed live infrequently.

== "Running Away" ==
"Running Away"

Single by VANO 3000 with BadBadNotGood & Samuel T. Herring
- Written: Alexander Sowinski; Chester Hansen; Leland Whitty; Matthew Tavares; Samuel T. Herring; Joseph Davidson
- Released: June 21, 2021; Unofficial: May 23, 2021
- Length: 1:51
- Label: Innovative Leisure
- Producer: VANO 3000

Track listing
- 1. "Running Away"; 2. "Running Away - Vocal Remix"

In June 2021, the track "Running Away", a beat heavily incorporating a looped sample of "Times Move Slow" went viral on TikTok as part of the Adult Swim trend. The track and trend was created by musician and TikTok creator VANO 3000 in late May, in tribute to the distinct bumpers on the American late night programming block Adult Swim. "Running Away" has been called nostalgic and "dream like". In regard to the composition, VANO took an instrumental from the original track 'adjusted the EQ and pitch and added filters to the sample' before adding in the lyrical phrase by Samuel T. Herring.

=== Reception and release ===
The trend went viral throughout June; as of June 8, 2021, the track has been used by nearly 2 billion TikTok videos; (Note: Per Forbes, the hashtag “adultswim” had 1.1 billion uses and “adultswimbump" 82.7 million.) as of June 18, 2021, VANO had been tagged in 500,000 of these TikTok videos and heard over 2.7 billion times. The trend has been lauded by content creators and subject to a number of pop culture think pieces. BadBadNotGood did not initially comment on the use of their song, but co-signed it on June 12 by participating in the trend.

As the track was an unofficial remix of copyrighted music, it was not available for purchase nor streaming and was bootlegged across many platforms. VANO worked to clear the sample throughout June. An official version of "Running Away" was released by VANO 3000 by BBNG's record label Innovative Leisure on June 21, 2021; BBNG and Herring are both credited.

== In other media ==
"Time Moves Slow" was featured in a 2018 episode of NBC's The Blacklist and a 2019 episode of HBO's Barry. Notably, a cover of the song was featured in the final sequence of the 2020 video game Dreams for PlayStation 4. The song was also used in the 2024 video game Harold Halibut for Windows, the Xbox Series and PlayStation 5.

== Personnel ==
Adapted from liner notes.

- Chester Hansen – bass guitar
- Alexander Sowinski – drums
- Matthew Tavares – crumar
- Leland Whitty – electric guitar
- Samuel T. Herring – vocals
- Stephen Koszler – mixing
- João Carvalho – mastering

== Certifications ==
Certifications for "Time Moves Slow"
Region	Certification	Certified units/sales
United Kingdom (BPI)	Silver	200,000^{‡}
^{‡} Sales+streaming figures based on certification alone.
