= Peals (band) =

American band

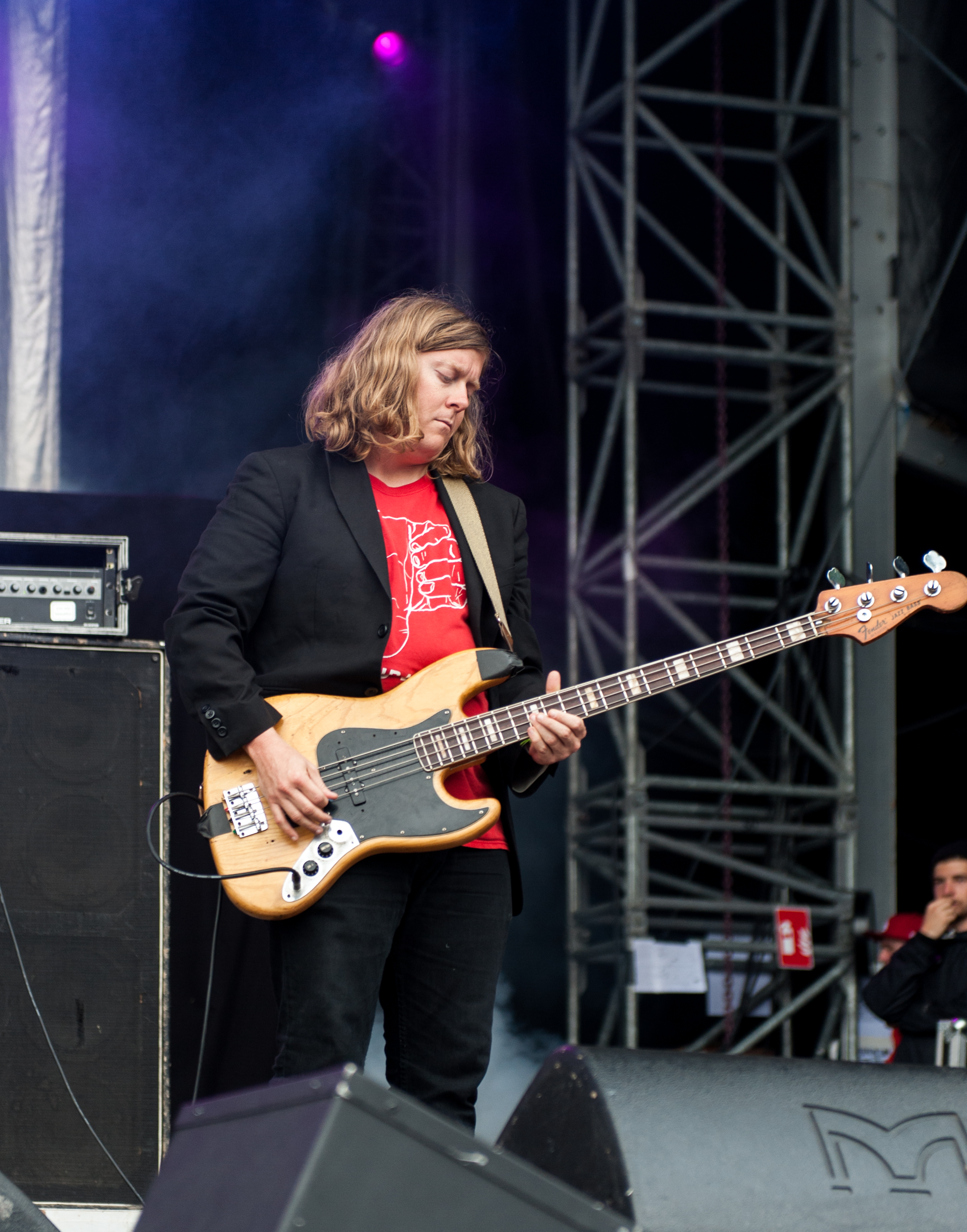
- William Cashion performing as Future Islands at the Kosmonaut Festival 2015 in Chemnitz Oberrabenstein.

Background information
- Origin: Baltimore, Maryland United States
- Genres: Ambient music, krautrock, experimental music, folk music, punk
- Years active: 2012–present
- Label: Thrill Jockey
- Members: William Cashion; Bruce Willen
- Website: pealsmusic.com

Peals is an American instrumental duo from Baltimore, Maryland, formed in early 2012 and composed of William Cashion and Bruce Willen. The two bass players of the Baltimore bands Future Islands and Double Dagger respectively, left bass, computer and drums aside to incorporate elements of ambient, folk, krautrock, punk, and experimental music into their project.

== History ==
=== Previous bands ===
William Cashion started playing guitar when he was around 13, having had a couple of bands as a teenager. While attending the East Carolina University in Greenville, North Carolina, he met Samuel T. Herring, with whom he started the band Art Lord & the Self-Portraits. The project would also include Adam Beeby, Kymia Nawabi and Gerrit Welmers. The band broke up in late 2005 and in early 2006, Cashion, Herring and Welmers formed Future Islands with Erick Murillo.

Bruce Willen had been in some bands in high school and done some solo home recordings for a few years. Originally a guitar player, he was oriented towards indie rock and folk. However, it's the metal band League Of Death that Willen would start with Nolen Strals while attending the Maryland Institute College of Art. In 2002 League Of Death evolved into the post-punk band Double Dagger, which would break up in late 2011.

When Future Islands relocated to Baltimore in 2008, its members shared a house with Double Dagger's vocalist Nolen Strals and between 2008 and 2010, the two bands also toured together on several occasions. Double Dagger's drummer Denny Bowen played live drums and additional percussion on Future Islands studio recordings and some live performances between 2008 and 2013, being one of the touring drummers for the Singles tour (2014), while Future Islands frontman, Samuel T. Herring contributed with vocals on the Double Dagger 2009 track "The Lie/The Truth".

=== Formation and Walking Field ===
Bruce Willen and William Cashion had talked about playing music together well before Double Dagger disbanded. But it was only in early 2012, following Double Dagger's final show on October 21, 2011, that they had the opportunity to experiment with moods and sounds different to their other projects,

Giving their first show in April 2012, for eight months the duo was known as Believers, but after finding a touring rock-band that already had that name, several other possibilities were considered until the name Peals was chosen for its abstract quality.

A peal is the sound of something ringing out, like the pealing of a bell or peals of laughter. We like how it describes something simple and abstract, yet evokes these moments that we hope surface through the music.

— Bruce Willen, in Jonny Abrams, Interview: Peals, Rocksucker

In early 2013 the band released on their website an interactive piece called Furniture, a sonic experiment composed of 16 different 30-second loops of sound, ranging from wind chimes to waves crashing to a plucked harp, allowing the listener to remix different parts together, producing a unique experience every time.

Later that year they released their full-length debut album Walking Field with Thrill Jockey. Recorded during June and July 2012 in Bruce Willen's living-room - in between Future Islands tours - it makes use of space and textures, manipulating guitar loops, keyboards, Fisher-Price xylophones, and field recordings into meditative sound collages.

=== Seltzer ===
In early 2015 Peals released Seltzer, a special limited edition cassette release featuring the April 2013 recording of a live performance - a collaboration with live video and sound installation Time is a Milk Bowl, by artist Zoe Friedman - that took place inside the clock room of Baltimore's Bromo Seltzer Tower. The B-side contained a second piece Before and After, described as a mixtape style collage of home recordings. Seltzer was reissued in 2025.

Always striving to create an intimate atmosphere on their live performances, the band played several East Coast shows in 2012, and even more, going as far as Canada when in 2013 Cashion's main project - Future Islands - took a break from touring. In March 2014, Future Islands released the album Singles. Its success led to a long tour that would last until November 2015, and though the project was not put on hold – Peals would perform on the West Coast in late 2014 - it reduced the number of shows given during that time. William Cashion has yet another on-going side project called The Snails, started in 2008 with Samuel T. Herring and featuring members of other Baltimore bands.

== Band members ==
- William Cashion - electric, acoustic, and floating guitars; field recordings; feedback.
- Bruce Willen - guitars, keyboards, walkie-talkies, toy piano, tambourine, feedback, microphones.

== Discography ==
=== Albums ===
- Walking Field (May 14, 2013)
- Honey (September 16, 2016)
- Le Pantoum 46 (2026)
- The Compound 76 (2026)

=== EPs ===
- Seltzer (Limited Edition Cassette) (January 27, 2015) reissued in other formats (December 2025)

=== Interactive Pieces ===
- Furniture (2012)
- Bubble Bath (2016)
