= Art Lord & the Self-Portraits =

American synthpop band

- Origin: Greenville, North Carolina, United States
- Genres: Synthpop, alternative rock, indie pop
- Years active: 2003–2005
- Labels: Friends Records, Thrill Jockey, 307 Knox Records
- Past members: Gerrit Welmers; William Cashion; Samuel T. Herring; Adam Beeby; Kymia Nawabi
- Website: www.future-islands.com/artlord/

Art Lord & the Self-Portraits was an American synthpop band in Greenville, North Carolina, composed of Gerrit Welmers (keyboards), William Cashion (bass, acoustic and electric guitars), and Samuel T. Herring (lyrics and vocals), Adam Beeby (rhythmic keyboard) and Kymia Nawabi (percussion and backing vocals). Created originally as a performance piece criticizing pretentiousness in the artistic world, when it disbanded in late 2005, its remaining members went on to form the synth-pop band Future Islands.

== History ==
=== Early life ===
Sam Herring and Gerrit Welmers grew up in Morehead City, North Carolina two streets away from each other, and attended the same middle school in Newport, North Carolina. They became friends during the 8th grade, around 1998. Herring had started making Hip-hop since he was 13 or 14, Gerrit was a Metal and Punk skater who bought his first guitar when he was 14. Having different musical backgrounds, they didn't consider making music together in high school.

William Cashion started playing guitar when he was around 13, having had a couple of bands as a teenager in Raleigh where he commuted to High School from Wendell, North Carolina. In 2002 he enrolled in the painting and drawing program at ECU and had drawing classes with Sam Herring. Cashion describes:

"So a lot of the freshmen had the same classes. My very first was this drawing class. Sam was in that class. Later that day, I had these sunglasses I used to wear. They were the Back to the Future shades. Neon yellow and neon orange and kind of an odd shape. I used to wear them all the time. I was walking across campus and Sam showed up and said, "Hey man, cool shades." He had really thick sideburns. They framed his face. It was almost a full beard. There was a little bit under the chin. "Cool sideburns man!" We found out that we were going to the same class. Pretty much immediately we started talking about music and ideas."

=== Formation ===
February 2003, Locke Ernst-Frost emerges from the banks of the Tar River, in the small, college town of Greenville, North Carolina. (...) He has spent everyday, since his retirement, dreaming, sculpting and painting the most beautiful thing in the world. Himself. After being set away for so long, he believed it was time to finally step out of the darkness, and sing to the world his tales of woe.

After auditioning musicians for his project, he realized it was fruitless. No one was good enough to play for him. Determined, he gave life to the only beings who were worthy to stand on the stage beside him, four tears dropped on canvas, and his Self-Portraits were born. Together, they set out, Locke, #1, #2, #3, and #4. Finally, the Art Lord and his Self-Portraits, could tell their story to the world... How hard it is, to be, so great.

— Art Lord: A synopsis by Sam Herring in BMore Music – October 18, 2012.

Cashion and Herring became friends and as Herring explains, decided to form a band: "Then, right before Christmas vacation after the end of the first semester of school, we had this strange idea for a performance group that would be based around this character Locke Ernstfrost. The idea was kind of a group that was more of a performance art piece, like a social commentary on how we treat rock stars and pop icons — art stars. Just how society treats them, kind of idolizes them even though they seem to be often very narcissistic or just full of themselves."

The idea came while Cashion was helping Herring to study for an art history exam, as Cashion describes:"We were going through different old classic art pieces. I kept saying stuff like, "I don't really like this piece. I don't care!" Sam was like, "We need to learn this!" My friend Kristen had come to pick me up, and she was, like, saying how I was being an art lord. Sam's roommate Ryan was laughing his ass off. I brought up the idea of having a project called Art Lord & the Self-Portraits."

Cashion and Herring invited local record shop personality Adam Beeby and fellow art student Kymia Nawabi. After a tumultuous debut on Valentine's Day February 14, 2003 at Soccer Moms' House, Herring would also invite Welmers to join the band: "After the first show I said, "Can my buddy Gerrit play with the band? He can play guitar." He's a really good musician. William was all about it. They had become friends. They didn't know each other so well, but they had become friends."

Only Cashion and Welmers already played a musical instrument—the guitar—but Cashion took the bass and Welmers the keyboards, for a Kraftwerk-inspired sound. According to Welmers: "I had never played music with anyone. I had always played alone. So I came over and I brought my guitar. They were just jamming around and playing stuff. But it didn't really work out very well. But there were a lot of extra keyboards lying around, so I started playing on one."

As the Art Lord, Sam Herring played Locke Ernst-Frost an arrogant narcissistic artist from Germany, Ohio, dressed in a 70's-inspired white suit with slicked-back hair, and a heavy German accent. He emerged in Greenville with the self-portraits he brought to life because they were the only ones good enough to be on a stage with him. The character's name originally was meant to be Oarlock Ernest Frost but it got shortened as a reference to John Locke the religious poet, Max Ernst, the artist and Robert Frost, the American poet.

=== Touring ===
The band quickly gained a local reputation and started touring the underground venues in the Southeast, such as The Milestone, Cat's Cradle, Kings, Peasants, The Red Rooster, The Soap Box among others, playing shows with North Carolina acts like Valient Thorr and artists from the Baltimore music scene like Height, Videohippos, OCDJ, Nuclear Power Pants, Santa Dads, Ecstatic Sunshine, Blood Baby, Ponytail and electronic musician Dan Deacon whom they met during a show on May 26, 2004. They gave a total of 130 shows between 2003-2005.

=== Break-up and reunion ===
Nawabi who was already a senior when Cashion, Herring and Welmers were freshmen, left the band to prepare for her final project in June–July 2003. When Adam Beeby had to leave Greenville in September 2005, the remaining members dissolved the band and went on to form Future Islands the following year. "Very quickly, we ran out of songs to go with the concept. We wanted to be more real and people still saw it as the concept. I got to hide behind that and the stage costumes we wore and the gimmicks. People saw us as a joke party band."

Art Lord & the Self Portraits got together again for a 10th anniversary reunion of their first show at the Kings in Raleigh, on February 13, 2013 with all the former band members. In 2008, William Cashion and Sam Herring formed a band to cover Art Lord & the Self-Portraits songs which they named The Snails, after the band's last album Snail. The Snails would gradually create their original content, but a cover of "We Were Flames" from the 2004 album Ideas for Housecrafts was included in The Snails' 2016 album Songs from the Shoebox.

== Musical style and influences ==
“I think we really wanted to be Kraftwerk.”

— William Cashion stated to Star News Online – January 13, 2005.

It was through Kraftwerk's Trans-Europe Express which was sampled by Afrika Bambaataa that Cashion and Herring found some common ground when forming the Kraftwerk-influenced Art Lord & the Self-Portraits. They explained:

"Our early influences were Kraftwerk and Joy Division and New Order, so it all kind of came from those sounds... We were just using what we had at our disposal to create, and that were old Casio and Yamaha keyboards and a borrowed bass guitar, borrowed amps. We scraped together what we could to make music with, weird shakers and sound makers and stuff, and that just kind of lead us down a road. These kinds of things defined us early on and we kept with that sound, kept painting with that palette."

== Members ==
- Samuel T. Herring - Locke Ernstfrost (lyrics and vocals)
- William Cashion - Self-Portrait #1 (bass, acoustic and electric guitars)
- Adam Beeby - Self-Portrait #2 (rhythmic keyboard)
- Kymia Nawabi - Self-Portrait #3 (percussion and backing vocals)
- Gerrit Welmers - Self-Portrait #4 (keyboards)

== Discography ==
=== Studio albums ===
- Searching for a Complement (self-released - August 2003; digital rerelease by Thrill Jockey)
- In Your Boombox (self-released - October 2003; digital rerelease by Thrill Jockey)
- Ideas for Housecrafts (self-released - February 2004; digital rerelease by Thrill Jockey)
- Snail (self-released - 2005; digital rerelease by Thrill Jockey)

=== Live albums ===
- Art Lord and the Self Portraits Live At Cat's Cradle 10/29/2004 (digital-only - 2004)

=== Compilation albums ===
- The Essential Art Lord & The Self - Portraits (self-release 2005)
- In Your Idea Box (digital-only "best-of" release 307 Knox Records - September 2008)
- The Definitive Collection 2xLP Friends Records - February 2013)

=== Compilation appearances ===
- "Sad Apples, Dance!" featured on Compilation Vol. 2: Songs from North Carolina (Poxworld Empire)
