= IV (BadBadNotGood album) =

Studio album by BadBadNotGood
- Released: July 8, 2016
- Recorded: Fall 2015–Spring 2016
- Studio: Studio 69 in Toronto
- Genre: Jazz; hip-hop; electronica; R&B; lounge
- Length: 50:33
- Label: Innovative Leisure
- Producer: BadBadNotGood

BadBadNotGood chronology
Sour Soul (2015)	IV (2016)	Spotify Live EP (2017)

Singles from IV
- 1. "Speaking Gently" Released: April 13, 2016; 2. "Time Moves Slow" Released: May 17, 2016; 3. "Confessions Pt II" Released: June 1, 2016; 4. "Lavender" Released: June 15, 2016; 5. "In Your Eyes" Released: June 30, 2016

IV is the fourth studio album from Canadian jazz instrumental hip-hop band BadBadNotGood. It was released on July 8, 2016. It features collaborations with Future Islands frontman Sam Herring, saxophonist Colin Stetson, Haitian-Canadian musician Kaytranada, American hip-hop artist Mick Jenkins, and Canadian singer-songwriter Charlotte Day Wilson.

It is also the band's first album to feature longtime touring partner and collaborator Leland Whitty as a formal member of the band.

== Background and recording ==
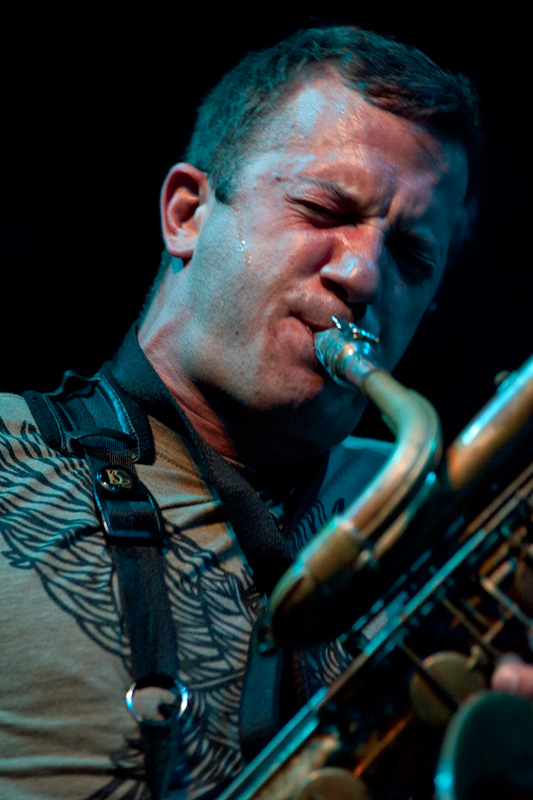
Colin Stetson is featured on "Confessions Pt II"

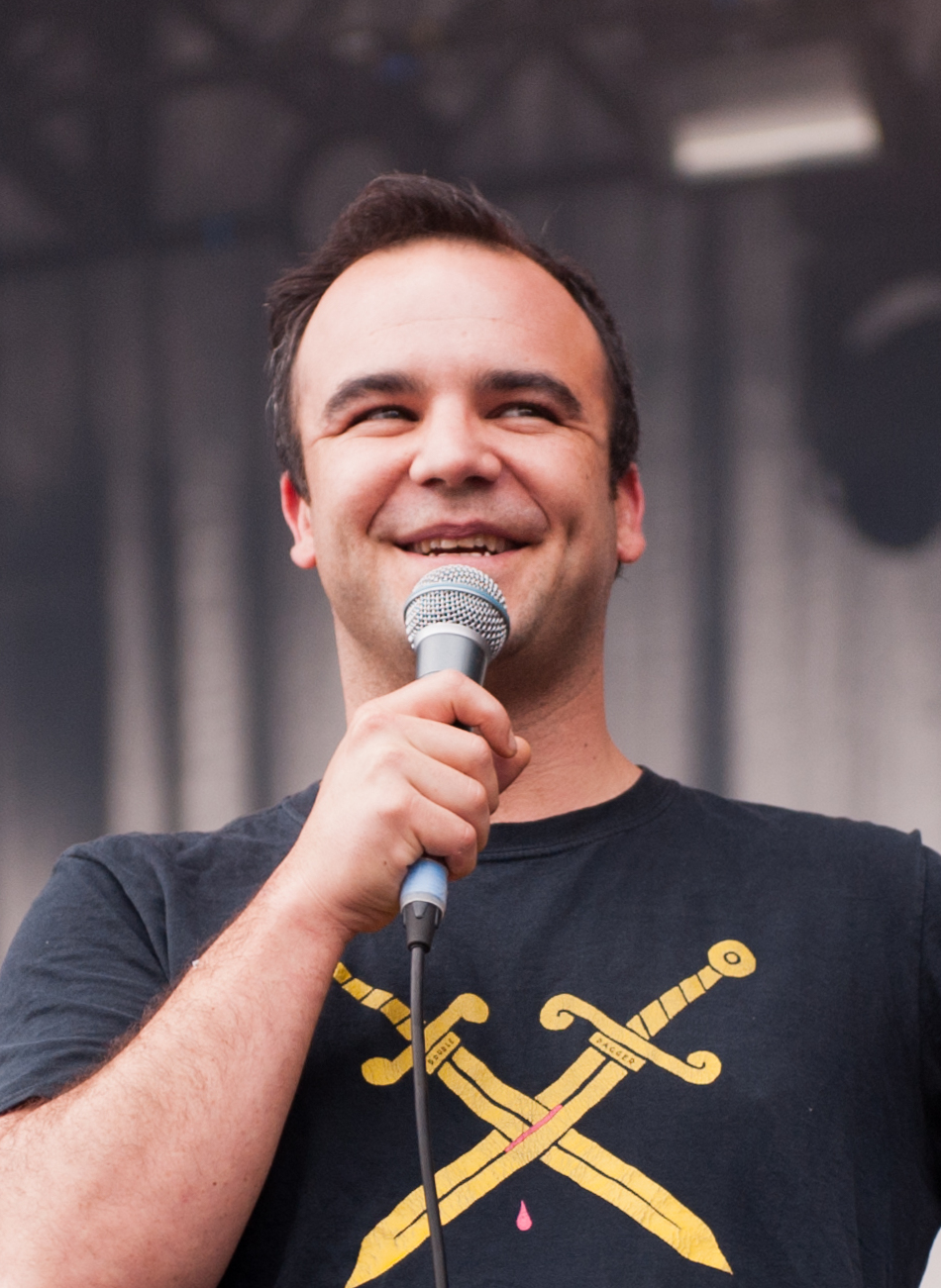
Sam Herring is featured on "Time Moves Slow"

In an interview with Howl & Echoes, the band described IV's conception and recording process:

Since we recorded and released III, we’ve been writing tons and tons of stuff inspired by all different sources. We were touring heavy after the release so we got exposed to a huge range of really talented artists at different festivals, and had many friends putting us on to great music from the past also. We wrote a whole batch of songs that were instrumentals early on in 2015, and recorded a few of them. After sitting on those for a while we decided to start from scratch, so starting in fall 2015 we began writing and recording the songs that became IV. We had a bunch of sessions booked with the very talented artists that appear on the album, and had some amazing creative times with them. There was no defined direction when we started, and we reached a point when we had so many different styles of song that we didn’t know what the album would even sound like all together! For a while we were still going to make it an all-instrumental album, and then we tossed together a salad of some of the amazing featured tracks, along with some instrumentals and it ended up working out!

With the album's cover art, Katie Hawthorne of The Skinny said: "Every single instrument used is listed with pride on the record's cover, and the [band] stand chests bare, towels around waists, bro-ing out."

== Critical reception ==
Professional ratings
Aggregate scores
Source	Rating
AnyDecentMusic?	7.5/10
Metacritic	77/100
Review scores
Source	Rating
AllMusic	4/5 stars
Consequence of Sound	B
DIY	3/5 stars
Exclaim!	9/10
The Irish Times	4/5 stars
The Observer	4/5 stars
Pitchfork	7.1/10
Q	4/5 stars
Spin	7/10
Uncut	7/10

IV received favorable reviews from contemporary music critics. At Metacritic, which assigns a normalized rating out of 100 to reviews from mainstream critics, the album received an average score of 77, based on 16 reviews, which indicates "generally favorable reviews".

Mackenzie Herd of Exclaim! praised the album, stating, "Each song possesses rhythmic and melodically intricate properties that sound somehow both rehearsed and spontaneous. So, while IV is extraordinary for delivering fresh music that elaborates on their past work, it feels particularly exceptional because of its forward momentum." Paul Simpson of AllMusic gave the album a favorable review, stating, "It's easy to see why BBNG are the type of jazz group that appeals to people who normally don't care for jazz. They're music lovers, first and foremost, and they're directly in tune with what's happening in the music world. They blend numerous influences and don't conform to any traditions. More than anything, their music is exuberant and immensely enjoyable." Carl Purvis of No Ripcord praised the vocals of Herring and Wilson, concluding that: "BBNG have always been fluent and sonically articulate, but enlisting the talents of suitable vocalists to thicken their smokescreen strengthens their suit."

Jamie Milton of DIY was more critical of the album, stating, "There’s not a great deal tying these songs together, aside from BBNG’s pursuit of the new. Collaborations aren’t here to generate headlines or set pulses racing - each serves its own noble purpose. Taken on their own, each track solidifies the group’s wild imagination, but IV is tough to stomach as the free-flowing, full-bodied juggernaut that it is."

=== Accolades ===
Publication	Accolade	Year	Rank
Rough Trade	Albums of the Year	2016	74
BBC 6 Music	Albums of the Year	2016	1

== Track listing ==
No.	Title	Writer(s)	Length
1.	"And That, Too."	Chester Hansen; Matty Tavares; Alex Sowinski; Leland Whitty	4:35
2.	"Speaking Gently"	Hansen; Tavares; Sowinski; Whitty	4:07
3.	"Time Moves Slow" (featuring Sam Herring)	Hansen; Tavares; Sowinski; Whitty; Sam Herring	4:33
4.	"Confessions Pt II" (featuring Colin Stetson)	Hansen; Tavares; Sowinski; Whitty; Colin Stetson	6:24
5.	"Lavender" (featuring Kaytranada)	Hansen; Tavares; Sowinski; Whitty; Kevin Celestin	3:21
6.	"Chompy's Paradise"	Hansen; Tavares; Sowinski; Whitty	3:56
7.	"IV"	Hansen; Tavares; Sowinski; Whitty	7:03
8.	"Hyssop of Love" (featuring Mick Jenkins)	Hansen; Tavares; Sowinski; Whitty; Jayson Jenkins	3:19
9.	"Structure No. 3"	Hansen; Tavares; Sowinski; Whitty	4:13
10.	"In Your Eyes" (featuring Charlotte Day Wilson)	Hansen; Tavares; Sowinski; Whitty; Charlotte Day Wilson	4:11
11.	"Cashmere"	Hansen; Tavares; Sowinski; Whitty	4:51
Total length:			50:33

== Personnel ==
The album logo that appears on the back of physical copies.

Credits adapted from the album's liner notes.

BadBadNotGood

- Matthew Tavares – piano (1, 4, 7, 11), Rhodes (2, 8, 9, 10), CS-60 (1, 9), crumar (3, 10), bass guitar (1), drum machine (1), Polysix (2), auxiliary synthesizer (5), Juno-60 (6); engineer, mixing
- Chester Hansen – bass guitar (1–8, 10, 11), CS-60 (4–6, 8), piano and crumar (2), Yamaha organ (5), acoustic bass (9)
- Alexander Sowinski – drums, percussion (1, 4–6, 11), vibraphone (10)
- Leland Whitty – electric guitar (3, 5, 8, 10), acoustic guitar (5, 10), tenor saxophone (1, 2, 4, 6, 7, 11), flute (1, 2, 6, 10, 11), bass clarinet (1, 6), soprano saxophone (1, 6), violin (10, 11), CS-60 (1), clarinet (1), vibraphone (1), alto saxophone (2)

Additional contributors

- Colin Stetson – bass saxophone (4), tenor saxophone (4)
- Kaytranada – CS-60 (5), percussion (5)
- Tom Moffat – trumpet and trombone (11)
- Sam Herring – vocals (3)
- Mick Jenkins – vocals (8)
- Charlotte Day Wilson – vocals (10)
- Stephen Koszler – mixing
- João Carvalho – mastering

== Charts ==
Chart (2016)	Peak position
Australian Albums (ARIA)	54
Belgian Albums (Ultratop Flanders)	48
Belgian Albums (Ultratop Wallonia)	106
New Zealand Heatseekers Albums (RMNZ)	9
UK Albums (OCC)	100
US Billboard 200	178
US Independent Albums (Billboard)	10
US Top Jazz Albums (Billboard)	1
US Top Contemporary Jazz Albums (Billboard)	1
US Heatseekers Albums (Billboard)	3
US Indie Store Album Sales (Billboard)	9
US Vinyl Albums (Billboard)	20
Canadian Albums (Billboard)	89
