= People Who Aren't There Anymore =

Studio album by Future Islands
- Released: January 26, 2024
- Recorded: 2020–2023
- Studio: Wright Way (Baltimore)
- Length: 43:55
- Label: 4AD
- Producers: Future Islands; Steve Wright

Future Islands chronology
As Long as You Are (2020)	People Who Aren't There Anymore (2024)

Singles from People Who Aren't There Anymore
- 1. "Peach" Released: August 18, 2021; 2. "King of Sweden" Released: February 16, 2022; 3. "Deep in the Night" Released: August 15, 2023; 4. "The Tower" Released: October 24, 2023; 5. "The Fight" Released: November 28, 2023; 6. "Say Goodbye" Released: January 8, 2024

People Who Aren't There Anymore is the seventh studio album by American synth-pop band Future Islands, released on January 26, 2024, by 4AD. Their fourth release on the label, the album was produced by the band and previous collaborator Steve Wright, who shared mixing duties with Chris Coady, the producer of the band's fourth album, Singles (2014).

Written and recorded between 2020 and 2023, the album chronicles the dissolution of frontman Samuel T. Herring's long-distance relationship across worldwide COVID-19 lockdowns.

== Artwork ==
The album was named after a painting by New Mexico-based artist Beedallo, whose painting Fading Memory of a Face serves as its cover.

== Critical reception ==
Professional ratings
Aggregate scores
Source	Rating
AnyDecentMusic?	7.5/10
Metacritic	75/100
Review scores
Source	Rating
AllMusic	3.5/5 stars
Clash	8/10
DIY	4/5 stars
Exclaim!	8/10
The Guardian	4/5 stars
The Line of Best Fit	7/10
NME	3/5 stars
Paste	8.2/10
Pitchfork	6.6/10
The Skinny	4/5 stars

People Who Aren't There Anymore received acclaim from contemporary music critics. At Metacritic, which assigns a normalized rating out of 100 to reviews from mainstream critics, the album received an average score of 75, based on 18 reviews, which indicates "generally favorable reviews".

== Track listing ==
All tracks are written by William Cashion, Samuel T. Herring, Mike Lowry, and Gerrit Welmers.

People Who Aren't There Anymore track listing
No.	Title	Length
1.	"King of Sweden"	4:11
2.	"The Tower"	3:36
3.	"Deep in the Night"	3:27
4.	"Say Goodbye"	3:58
5.	"Give Me the Ghost Back"	3:17
6.	"Corner of My Eye"	3:53
7.	"The Thief"	3:21
8.	"Iris"	3:44
9.	"The Fight"	4:27
10.	"Peach"	3:12
11.	"The Sickness"	4:01
12.	"The Garden Wheel"	2:48
Total length:		43:55

== Personnel ==
Future Islands

- William Cashion – production
- Samuel T. Herring – production
- Mike Lowry – production
- Gerrit Welmers – production

Additional contributors

- Steve Wright – production, mixing, engineering
- Joe LaPorta – mastering
- Chris Coady – mixing
- Paul Mercer – additional engineering
- Nolen Strals – art direction
- Beedallo – cover
- Jeff McGrath – guitar (track 8)
- Amy Shook – cello (track 10)

== Charts ==
Chart performance for People Who Aren't There Anymore
Chart (2024)	Peak position
Belgian Albums (Ultratop Flanders)	141
German Albums (Offizielle Top 100)	95
Portuguese Albums (AFP)	33
Scottish Albums (Official Charts)	6
Swiss Albums (Schweizer Hitparade)	73
UK Albums (Official Charts)	7
UK Independent Albums (Official Charts)	3
