= Rubble (disambiguation) =

Rubble may refer to:

- Rubble, stone debris/fragments
  - Rubble masonry
  - Rubble pile, in astronomy
  - Riprap
- Rubble Crab, a type of crab
- Rubble Creek, in southwestern British Columbia, Canada

== Entertainment ==
- Rubble film
- Rubble literature
- Rubble series, compilation albums of late-1960s British psychedelic rock
- The Rubbles, Barney and Betty Rubble (and other characters from their family) from the Flintstones animated television and live action film series
- Ragged Rubble, post hardcore music album
- Rubble, a character from Paw Patrol

== See also ==
- Rubblization
- Ruble
- Debris
