= Double Dagger (band) =

American band

- Origin: Baltimore, Maryland, United States
- Genres: Post-punk, post-hardcore, noise rock
- Instruments: Vocals, Bass, Drums
- Years active: 2002–2011; 2021
- Labels: Thrill Jockey; Stationary (Heart); Hit-Dat Records; Toxic Pop; Terra Firma LTD
- Members: Nolen Strals; Bruce Willen; Denny Bowen
- Website: Official Site

Double Dagger is a post-punk trio from Baltimore, Maryland composed of only drums, vocals, and a loud bass guitar which fills the space a guitar would normally take. Vocalist Nolen Strals and bassist Bruce Willen also comprised the graphic design team Post Typography, which has done work for some very high-profile clients, including The New York Times. Hence, Double Dagger made a habit of referring to their style of post-hardcore as "graphicdesigncore" early in their career. In October 2011, Double Dagger officially broke up after a small final tour, but has since reunited occasionally for one-off shows.

== History ==
Nolen Strals and Bruce Willen initially met while they were students at the Maryland Institute College of Art in Baltimore. There, Strals and Willen started a group called League of Death, which was initially conceived as a heavy metal outfit, but later became a hardcore band. League of Death broke up in 2002 after a final show with the Yeah Yeah Yeahs, giving rise to Double Dagger, as a self-described "graphicdesigncore" band, with several songs referencing design and typographic elements on their first releases (the band itself was named after the typographic symbol ‡, used for footnotes). Brian Dubin, who had previously played bass in Baltimore rock band Stars of the Dogon and guitar in Baltimore's beloved Charm City Suicides during their final year, joined the new band as a drummer and played on the bands' first few recordings, including their self-titled debut album. He left in 2005 and was replaced by Denny Bowen, then of Yukon, formerly of the band Economist, with whom Double Dagger had released a split single in 2003.

During their 9-year run, Double Dagger played with a number of high-profile acts, including Pere Ubu, Lightning Bolt, The Ex, The Buzzcocks, The Jesus Lizard, and Matt & Kim. They have released several EPs, 7" singles, and three full length albums. The band earned considerable critical praise as well, as evinced by positive reviews in publications such as The Washington Post, Punk Planet, Baltimore City Paper and Rolling Stone. Citing time restraints and "chaotic personal lifes," Double Dagger announced they would break up following a brief tour of the eastern United States, and a final show in their hometown of Baltimore. Bowen later appeared in Roomrunner and performed live with Dan Deacon and Future Islands, Willen appears in Peals alongside of William Cashion of Future Islands, and Strals appears in Pure Junk and Second Best Westerns.

In 2021, 10 years since their breakup, Double Dagger reunited for two shows in Baltimore. One at The Ottobar on October 15 and one at Current Gallery on October 16. Concurrently, they also released Sophisticated Urban Living (Contemporary Conveniences Edition), an expanded version of their 2008 7" with unreleased alternate recordings.

== Band members ==
=== Current members ===
- Nolen Strals: vocals
- Bruce Willen: bass
- Denny Bowen: drums

=== Past, guest, or temporary members ===
- Brian Dubin: drums (2002–2004)
- Samuel T. Herring (of Future Islands) appears on "The Lie/The Truth" from More (2009) and occasionally appears live with the band.
- Lee Ashlin (The Fuses), Sean McGuiness (Pissed Jeans), and Ben Valis (Stars of the Dogon) have all performed with Double Dagger at various live shows

== Discography ==
=== Albums ===
- Double Dagger (Hit-Dat Records 2003)
- Ragged Rubble (Stationary Heart Recordings 2007)
- MORE (Thrill Jockey Records 2009)

=== Singles and EPs ===
- Alt+0135 (Self Released 2002)
- Art School Girlfriend/Obey the One Trick Pony' (Hit-Dat Records 2003, split with Economist)
- Luxury (Self Released 2006, cassette only)
- Luxury (Self Released 2007, CDR of four tracks from Ragged Rubble recordings)
- Bored Meeting 7" (Toxic Pop 2008)
- Sophisticated Urban Living 7" (Terra Firma Limited 2008)
- Masks (Thrill Jockey Records 2010)
- 333 (Thrill Jockey Records 2013)
- Sophisticated Urban Living (Contemporary Conveniences Edition) (Thrill Jockey Records 2021)
