= The Far Field (album) =

Studio album by Future Islands
- Released: April 7, 2017
- Recorded: 2016
- Studio: Sunset Sound Recorders (Hollywood, California); Mercy Sound (New York City, New York)
- Genre: Synth-pop; new wave; indie pop
- Length: 45:14
- Label: 4AD
- Producer: John Congleton

Future Islands chronology
Singles (2014)	The Far Field (2017)	As Long as You Are (2020)

Singles from The Far Field
- 1. "Ran" Released: January 31, 2017; 2. "Cave" Released: March 24, 2017

The Far Field is the fifth studio album by American synthpop band Future Islands, released on April 7, 2017 through 4AD. Several parallels can be made between this studio album and the band's second studio album, In Evening Air: both are titled after the final volume of poetry by Theodore Roethke, and both have album art produced by former band member Kymia Nawabi.

== Critical reception ==
Professional ratings
Aggregate scores
Source	Rating
Metacritic	77/100
Review scores
Source	Rating
AllMusic	3.5/5 stars
The Guardian	3/5 stars
Mojo	4/5 stars
NME	4/5 stars
Pitchfork	7.6/10
Q	4/5 stars
Rolling Stone	3.5/5 stars
Spin	6/10
Exclaim!	9/10

The Far Field received generally positive reviews from music critics. At Metacritic, which assigns a normalized rating out of 100 to reviews from mainstream critics, the album received an average score of 77, based on 29 reviews, which indicates "generally favorable reviews" and UK-based music webzine Drowned In Sound ranked it at 98 on their list of 100 favorite albums of 2017.

== Track listing ==
All tracks are written by Future Islands.

No.	Title	Length
1.	"Aladdin"	4:13
2.	"Time on Her Side"	3:39
3.	"Ran"	3:26
4.	"Beauty of the Road"	4:09
5.	"Cave"	3:52
6.	"Through the Roses"	3:15
7.	"North Star"	3:35
8.	"Ancient Water"	3:56
9.	"Candles"	3:57
10.	"Day Glow Fire"	3:49
11.	"Shadows" (featuring Debbie Harry)	4:05
12.	"Black Rose"	3:25
Total length:		45:14

== Charts ==
Chart (2017)	Peak position
Australian Albums (ARIA)	60
Austrian Albums (Ö3 Austria)	49
Belgian Albums (Ultratop Flanders)	31
Belgian Albums (Ultratop Wallonia)	102
Dutch Albums (Album Top 100)	64
German Albums (Offizielle Top 100)	74
Irish Albums (IRMA)	11
New Zealand Heatseekers Albums (RMNZ)	2
Portuguese Albums (AFP)	21
Scottish Albums (OCC)	9
Spanish Albums (PROMUSICAE)	37
Swedish Albums (Sverigetopplistan)	58
Swiss Albums (Schweizer Hitparade)	38
UK Albums (OCC)	18
US Billboard 200	52
