= As Long as You Are =

Studio album by Future Islands
- Released: October 9, 2020
- Genre: Synth-pop
- Length: 44:25
- Label: 4AD
- Producers: Gerrit Welmers; Samuel T. Herring; William Cashion

Future Islands chronology
The Far Field (2017)	As Long as You Are (2020)	People Who Aren't There Anymore (2024)

Singles from As Long as You Are
- 1. "For Sure" Released: July 8, 2020; 2. "Thrill" Released: August 12, 2020; 3. "Moonlight" Released: September 15, 2020; 4. "Plastic Beach" Released: January 4, 2021

Professional ratings
Aggregate scores
Source	Rating
Metacritic	74/100
Review scores
Source	Rating
Consequence of Sound	B
The Guardian	4/5 stars
NME	4/5 stars
Paste	8/10
Pitchfork	6.1/10
Beats Per Minute	78%
The Line of Best Fit	9/10
musicOMH	4.5/5 stars
Loud and Quiet	8/10

As Long as You Are is the sixth studio album by American synth-pop band Future Islands, released on October 9, 2020. The album was the first to feature Michael Lowry as proper member of the band, after previously serving as their touring drummer since 2014.

== Critical reception ==
As Long as You Are received acclaim from contemporary music critics. At Metacritic, which assigns a normalized rating out of 100 to reviews from mainstream critics, the album received an average score of 74, based on 18 reviews, which indicates "generally favorable reviews".

== Track listing ==
All tracks are written by Future Islands.

As Long as You Are track listing
No.	Title	Length
1.	"Glada"	4:18
2.	"For Sure"	3:24
3.	"Born in a War"	4:12
4.	"I Knew You"	4:12
5.	"City's Face"	3:50
6.	"Waking"	4:08
7.	"The Painter"	4:50
8.	"Plastic Beach"	3:40
9.	"Moonlight"	3:38
10.	"Thrill"	4:20
11.	"Hit the Coast"	3:53
Total length:		44:25

== Personnel ==
Personnel taken from As Long as You Are liner notes. Future Islands

- Samuel T. Herring – vocals, lyrics
- Gerrit Welmers – keyboards, programming, guitar
- William Cashion – bass, guitar, programming, piano
- Michael Lowry – drums, percussion, vibes

Technical personnel

- Future Islands – production
- Steve Wright – production, engineering, mixing
- Paul Mercer – assistant engineering
- Tony Eichler – mastering

== Charts ==
Chart performance for As Long as You Are
Chart (2020)	Peak position
Belgian Albums (Ultratop Flanders)	105
Belgian Albums (Ultratop Wallonia)	178
German Albums (Offizielle Top 100)	45
Irish Albums (Official Charts)	35
Portuguese Albums (AFP)	11
Scottish Albums (Official Charts)	9
Swiss Albums (Schweizer Hitparade)	74
UK Albums (Official Charts)	22
US Billboard 200	108
US Top Rock Albums (Billboard)	17
