= On the Water (album) =

Studio album by Future Islands
- Released: October 11, 2011
- Genres: Synthpop, alternative rock
- Length: 41:41
- Label: Thrill Jockey
- Producer: Chester Endersby Gwazda

Future Islands chronology
In Evening Air (2010)	On the Water (2011)	Singles (2014)

Singles from On the Water
- 1. "Balance" Released: July 2011

On the Water is the third album by synthpop band Future Islands. The album was released on 11 October 2011 on Thrill Jockey records.

The album was recorded in a friend's house in Elizabeth City, North Carolina between March and May 2011. Wye Oak's Jenn Wasner duets on The Great Fire.

The album peaked at number 12 on the Billboard Heatseekers chart.

== Reception ==
Professional ratings
Aggregate scores
Source	Rating
AnyDecentMusic?	7.6/10
Metacritic	80/100
Review scores
Source	Rating
The A.V. Club	A−
Beats Per Minute	70%
Consequence of Sound	B
Drowned in Sound	8/10
Paste	8.9/10
Pitchfork	7.7/10
PopMatters	9/10 stars
Tiny Mix Tapes	4.5/5 stars
Under the Radar	7/10

The album received generally positive reviews with Pitchfork giving it 7.7/10 and The A.V. Club giving it an A−. The aggregated score from 21 critics on Metacritic is 80/100.

== Track listing ==
All tracks are written by Future Islands

No.	Title	Length
1.	"On the Water"	4:52
2.	"Before the Bridge"	4:00
3.	"The Great Fire"	3:14
4.	"Open"	1:28
5.	"Where I Found You"	5:44
6.	"Give Us the Wind"	4:06
7.	"Close to None"	6:20
8.	"Balance"	4:06
9.	"Tybee Island"	3:16
10.	"Grease"	4:35

No.	Title	Length
11.	"Crish (Javelin Remixxx) [iTunes Bonus Track]"	3:18

== Personnel ==
Personnel taken from On The Water liner notes.

Future Islands

- Gerrit Welmers – keyboards, programming, electric guitar
- William Cashion – bass guitar, electric, acoustic & effects guitars
- Samuel T. Herring – vocals, lyrics

Additional performers

- Denny Bowen – drums, additional percussion
- Jenn Wasner – vocals on "The Great Fire"
- Kate Barutha – cello on "Grease" and "Where I Found You"
- Victor Ruch – violin on "Grease"
- Dave Jacober – marimba on "Where I Found You" and "Balance"
- Chester Endersby Gwazda – additional programming, string arrangements

Technical personnel

- Chester Endersby Gwazda – producer
- Sarah Register – mastering
