= More (Double Dagger album) =

MORE

Studio album by Double Dagger
- Released: 2009
- Genre: Post-hardcore
- Length: 39:50
- Label: Thrill Jockey

Double Dagger chronology
| Ragged Rubble (2007) | MORE (2009) | Masks (2010) |

Professional ratings
Review scores
| Source | Rating |
|---|---|
| Pitchfork Media | 7.0/10 |

MORE is the third full-length album by Baltimore punk rock band Double Dagger.

== Track listing ==
1. "No Allies" – 2:45
2. "Vivre Sans Temps Mort" – 5:25
3. "We Are The Ones" – 3:41
4. "Camouflage" – 3:34
5. "The Lie/The Truth" – 2:56
6. "Surrealist Composition With Your Face" – 3:33
7. "Helicopter Lullaby" – 4:18
8. "Neon Gray" – 3:24
9. "Half-Life" – 5:53
10. "Two-Way Mirror" – 4:21
11. "Stagger Lee (Bonus Digital Only Track)" – 3:06

== Personnel ==
- Denny Bowen – drums
- Nolen Strals – vocals
- Bruce Willen – bass
