= Double Dagger (album) =

Studio album by Double Dagger
- Released: 2003
- Genre: Post-hardcore
- Length: 22:59
- Label: Hit-Dat Records

Double Dagger chronology
Alt+0135 (2002)	Double Dagger (2003)	Ragged Rubble (2007)

Professional ratings
Review scores
Source	Rating
Allmusic	2.5/5 stars

Double Dagger is the eponymous debut full length by Baltimore punk rock band Double Dagger. It features original drummer Brian Dubin, and is markedly more garage rock in feel than the group's more recent work.

== Track listing ==
1. "I Was So Bored, I Wanted To Hang Myself On The Dance Floor" – 1:48
2. "Corporate Logo Preservation Society" – 2:31
3. "Pound Of Flesh" – 1:57
4. "Punk Rock Vs. Swiss Modernism" – 2:39
5. "CMYK" – 2:20
6. "My Dad Has A Theory That The Internet Is The Roman Coliseum Of Our Times" – 2:39
7. "Command+X Command+Y" – 2:19
8. "Comic Book Lettering" – 2:01
9. "You're Getting Paid To Make My Life Harder" – 2:17
10. "Lorem Ipsum" – 2:28

== Personnel ==
- Nolen Strals – vocals
- Bruce Willen – bass
- Brian Dubin – drums
