= Time and Materials (album) =

Studio album by Cavanaugh (Serengeti & Open Mike Eagle)
- Released: November 19, 2015
- Genre: Hip-hop
- Length: 25:57
- Label: Mello Music Group
- Producer: Open Mike Eagle

Cavanaugh (Serengeti & Open Mike Eagle) chronology
Time and Materials (2015)	Quarantine Recordings (2020)

Time and Materials is the first collaborative studio album by Serengeti & Open Mike Eagle, released under the group moniker Cavanaugh. It was released on Mello Music Group on November 19, 2015. Entirely produced by Open Mike Eagle, it features guest appearances from P.O.S, Hemlock Ernst, and Busdriver. It is a concept album about "a couple of maintenance veterans named Dave and Mike who work in Cavanaugh, a fictional mixed-income housing unit in the also-fictional town of Detroit, Florida."

== Critical reception ==
Professional ratings
Review scores
Source	Rating
HipHopDX	3.5/5
Pitchfork	7.2/10
RapReviews.com	8/10
Vice	(3-star Honorable Mention)

Nate Patrin of Pitchfork gave the album a 7.2 out of 10, writing, "for his first full-length production job, Mike sets a tone as raw-nerved and abrasively contemplative as the concept demands." Brett Uddenberg of San Diego Reader wrote, "this is a dense and diverse record that plays to the songwriting strengths of Mike and Serengeti and hints at greater things to come as their partnership evolves."

Spin placed it at number 44 on the "50 Best Hip-Hop Albums of 2015" list.

== Track listing ==
No.	Title	Length
1.	"Zorak"	2:43
2.	"Screen Play"	3:03
3.	"Overland"	3:47
4.	"Typecast" (featuring P.O.S, Hemlock Ernst, and Busdriver)	4:20
5.	"Pinky"	3:44
6.	"Church"	2:06
7.	"Tar"	1:54
8.	"Wonder Girl"	1:33
9.	"Lemons" (featuring Hemlock Ernst)	2:47
Total length:		25:57

== Personnel ==
Credits adapted from liner notes.

- Open Mike Eagle – vocals, production
- Serengeti – vocals
- P.O.S – vocals (4)
- Busdriver – vocals (4)
- Hemlock Ernst – vocals (4, 9)
- Committee – mixing
- Daddy Kev – mastering
- Stephen Eichhorn – cover photography
