= Ragged Rubble =

Studio album by Double Dagger
- Released: May 26, 2007
- Recorded: 2004–2006
- Genre: Post-hardcore, post-punk
- Length: 30:57
- Label: Stationary (Heart) Recordings

Double Dagger chronology
Double Dagger (2003)	Ragged Rubble (2007)	MORE (2009)

Professional ratings
Review scores
Source	Rating
Pitchfork Media	7.3/10

Ragged Rubble is an album by post hardcore band Double Dagger.

== Track listing ==
1. "The Psychic"
2. "Empty Dictionary"
3. "Luxury Condos for the Poor"
4. "Form+Function"
5. "Stripes"
6. "ITCFGDIY"
7. "Army vs. Navy"
8. "Pissing Contest"
9. "Camera Chimera"
10. "Camera Chimera (Reprise)"
11. "Plagiarism"
12. "Rearranging Digital Deck Chairs"
