= Seasons (Waiting on You) =

2014 song by Future Islands

Single by Future Islands

from the album Singles
- B-side: "One Day"
- Released: February 4, 2014
- Recorded: August 2013
- Studio: Dreamland (Hurley, New York)
- Genre: Synth-pop; new wave
- Length: 3:46
- Label: 4AD
- Songwriters: William Cashion; Samuel T. Herring; J. Gerrit Welmers
- Producer: Chris Coady

Future Islands singles chronology
"Tomorrow" / "The Fountain" (2012)	"Seasons (Waiting on You)" (2014)	"A Dream of You and Me" (2015)

Music video
- "Seasons (Waiting on You)" on YouTube

"Seasons (Waiting on You)" is a song by American synthpop band Future Islands. It is the opening track on their fourth studio album Singles, and was released as the album's lead single on February 4, 2014. The song received much critical acclaim, topping The Village Voice's annual year-end Pazz & Jop critics' poll and also being named the best track of 2014 by publications such as NME, Pitchfork, and Spin. In 2019, it was named the 34th best song of the 2010s by Pitchfork, and was ranked 94th on Rolling Stone's 100 Best Songs of the 2010s.

== Critical reception ==
=== Accolades ===
Accolades for "Seasons (Waiting on You)"
Publication	Accolade	Rank
Consequence of Sound	Top 50 Songs of 2014	1
Pitchfork	The 100 Best Tracks of 2014	1
Pazz & Jop	Single of the Year 2014	1
Spin	The 101 Best Songs of 2014	1
NME	Top 50 Tracks of 2014	1
PopMatters	The 75 Best Songs of 2014	2
Drowned in Sound	40 Favourite Songs of 2014	4
Slant Magazine	The 25 Best Singles of 2014	8
Paste	The 50 Best Songs of 2014	8
Rolling Stone	50 Best Songs of 2014	9
American Songwriter	Top 50 Songs of 2014	14
Pitchfork	The 200 Best Tracks of the Decade So Far (2010–2014)	123
Pitchfork	The 200 Best Songs of the 2010s	34

== Live performances ==
The band's performance of the song on Late Show with David Letterman became an internet hit due to frontman Samuel T. Herring's visual and vocal performance, which included elaborate and angular dance moves and death metal-style growls. Herring also put on a similarly unusual performance during the band's performance of the song on Later... with Jools Holland.

== Track listing ==
- 7-inch single
1. "Seasons (Waiting on You)" – 3:46
2. "One Day" – 4:27
- Digital download (remix)
1. "Seasons (Waiting on You)" (BADBADNOTGOOD Reinterpretation) – 3:43

== Charts ==
Chart performance for "Seasons (Waiting on You)"
Chart (2014)	Peak position
Australia (ARIA Hitseekers)	13
Belgium (Ultratop 50 Flanders)	50
UK Indie (Official Charts)	25
US Hot Rock & Alternative Songs (Billboard)	50
US Adult Alternative Airplay (Billboard)	27
US Alternative Airplay (Billboard)	37

== Certifications ==
Certifications for "Seasons (Waiting on You)"
Region	Certification	Certified units/sales
Canada (Music Canada)	Gold	40,000^{‡}
New Zealand (RMNZ)	Gold	15,000^{‡}
United Kingdom (BPI)	Silver	200,000^{‡}
United States (RIAA)	Gold	500,000^{‡}
^{‡} Sales+streaming figures based on certification alone.

== Release history ==
Release history for "Seasons (Waiting on You)"
Region	Date	Format	Label
United States	February 4, 2014	7-inch vinyl	4AD Records
United States	June 30, 2014	Digital download	4AD Records
