= The Snails =

US musical group

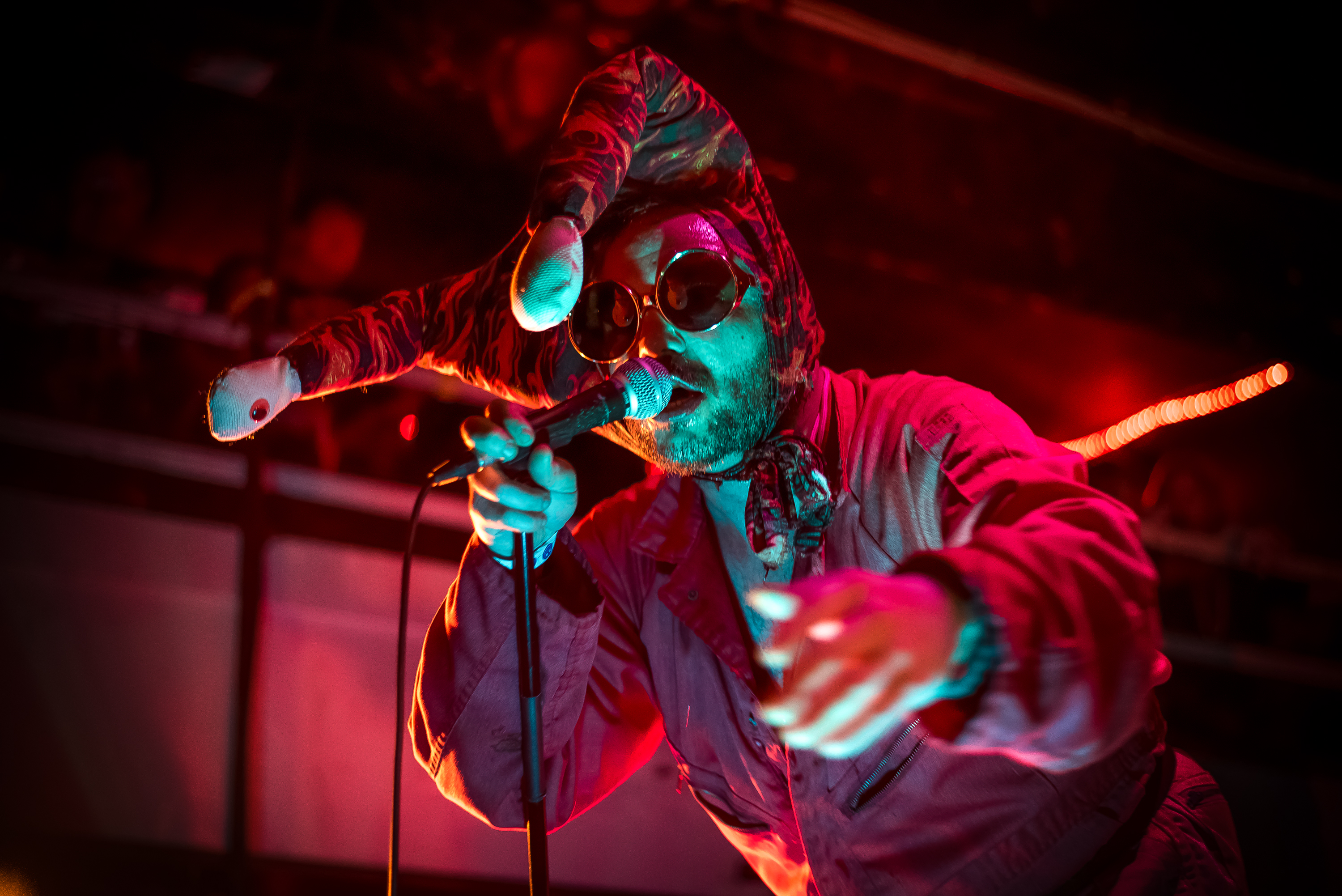
- Sammy Snail (Samuel T. Herring) of The Snails

Background information
- Origin: Baltimore, Maryland, United States
- Genres: Alternative rock, surf-rock, post-punk, reggae, ska
- Years active: 2008–present
- Label: Friends Records
- Members: Sandy Snailbelow (Andy Abelow); Snailliam (William Cashion); Sammy Snail (Samuel T. Herring); Snailburne (Drew Swinburne); Snailbraham (Abram Sanders); Snailrell (Ryan Syrell); Snailpril (April Camlin).
- Past members: R.M. O'Brien, Joel Herring, Brian Corum, Andrew Burt and Justin Lucas.
- Website: future-islands.com/snails.html

The Snails is an American rock band with touches of post-punk, ska and reggae, based in Baltimore, Maryland. It is currently composed of Sandy Snailbelow, Snailliam, Sammy Snail (also known as Snamuel or Snammy), Snailburne, Snailbraham, Snailrell and Snailpril. As snails, they live in a Shoebox, where they like to play basketball.

== History ==
=== 2008: Formation ===
The Snails formed in the summer of 2008 in Baltimore, Maryland, when rapper Spank Rock asked Future Islands to play his birthday party. Future Islands' third member Gerrit Welmers was out of town, so Samuel T. Herring and William Cashion put together a group of friends to play some old songs by Art Lord & the Self-Portraits (the band that preceded Future Islands).

=== 2008–2013: Art Lord & the Self-Portraits ===
Gradually producing their own material, the Snails are described by their record label - Friend’s Records - as “Baltimore’s answer to the California Raisins”.

As far as the meta-concept behind being a snail, there really isn't. We were just born this way, snails. The music that we breathe out is pretty natural, mitochondrion and all that stuff.

— Snailbraham, in Kyle Petersen, Future Islands members goof off with friends in the Snails, Charleston City Paper

Wearing colorful snail headpieces and outfits, the Snails have had a rotating cast of members. From 2008 to 2013, they played some 10 shows in the Baltimore area. Apart from being snails, their slow pace can also be explained by the fact that their members come from several Baltimore bands – Future Islands, Lower Dens, Wume, Nuclear Power Pants, Small Sur, Teeth Mountain, Lonnie Walker, Wing Dam amongst others - with different touring calendars.

=== 2013–2015: Worth the Wait ===
In April 2013 The Snails released the EP Worth the Wait, a five-song gatefold double 7" which was promoted by an East Coast tour of another 10 shows. A full-length album Songs from the Shoebox was recorded between December 2013 and November 2015 by producer Chester Endersby Gwazda.

After the success of Future Islands' album Singles released in March 2014, Future Islands toured massively until late 2015, leaving the project on hold.

=== 2015–present: Songs from the Shoebox ===
In November 2015, The Snails released the Christmas song “Snails Christmas (I Want A New Shell)”. A re-recording of an already released track included on the 2013 compilation Baltimas!!!!! In March 2016 they toured the US East Coast again, to promote the release of their debut album Songs From the Shoebox, also produced by Chester Endersby Gwazda and released in February 2016. It features 10 songs, of which “Flames” is an Art Lord & the Self-Portraits cover.

== Band members ==
Current members

- Sandy Snailbelow (Andy Abelow of Small Sur, and Showbiz!) - alto saxophone and keyboards
- Snailliam (William Cashion of Future Islands and Peals) - bass
- Sammy Snail (Samuel T. Herring of Future Islands) - vocals
- Snailburne (Drew Swinburne of Nuclear Power Pants) - guitar
- Snailbraham (Abram Sanders of Wing Dam) - drums
- Snailrell (Ryan Syrell) - alto saxophone
- Snailpril (April Camlin) - musical saw

Former members

- Jana Hunter (of Lower Dens)
- R.M. O'Brien (of Nuclear Power Pants)
- Joel Herring (of Plucky Walker)
- Brian Corum (of Lonnie Walker)
- Andrew Burt
- Justin Lucas (known as Justnailin)

== Discography ==
=== Albums ===
- Songs From the Shoebox (February 14, 2016)

=== EPs ===
- Worth The Wait (April 20, 2013)

=== Compilation appearances ===
- "Snails Christmas (I Want a New Shell)" from Baltimas!!!!!!!!! (December 24, 2013)
