= In Evening Air =

Studio album by Future Islands
- Released: May 4, 2010
- Genre: Synth-pop; alternative rock
- Length: 36:04
- Label: Thrill Jockey
- Producer: Chester Endersby Gwazda

Future Islands chronology
Wave Like Home (2008)	In Evening Air (2010)	On the Water (2011)

Singles from In Evening Air
- 1. "Tin Man" Released: 2010; 2. "In the Fall" Released: 2010

In Evening Air is the second album by American synth-pop band Future Islands, released on May 4, 2010, by Thrill Jockey records. It is titled after a poem of the same name by Theodore Roethke from his final collection, The Far Field. The album art was produced by former band member Kymia Nawabi.

In Evening Air was heavily influenced by Orchestral Manoeuvres in the Dark's 1983 album, Dazzle Ships.

== Track listing ==
All tracks are written by Future Islands

No.	Title	Length
1.	"Walking Through That Door"	4:34
2.	"Long Flight"	5:15
3.	"Tin Man"	3:14
4.	"An Apology"	3:44
5.	"In Evening Air"	1:13
6.	"Swept Inside"	4:47
7.	"Inch of Dust"	3:34
8.	"Vireo's Eye"	4:08
9.	"As I Fall"	5:35

Notes

- "Long Flight" features samples of a recording of the STS-1 first orbital space shuttle launch on April 12, 1981 at Cape Canaveral Florida, recorded by William Cashion.
- The album title was inspired by a Theodore Roethke poem of the same name.

== Personnel ==
Personnel taken from In Evening Air liner notes.

Future Islands

- J. Gerrit Welmers – synthesizers, programming
- Samuel T. Herring – vocals, lyrics
- William Cashion – bass & acoustic guitars

Additional musicians

- Denny Bowen – drums, percussion
- Andrew M. Burt – violin on "Swept Inside" and "As I Fall"
- Owen Gardner – cello on "Tin Man", "Swept Inside" and "As I Fall"
- Chester Endersby Gwadza – additional programming

Technical personnel

- Chester Endersby Gwadza – producer
- Joe Galarraga – assistant engineer
- Heba Kadry – mastering

== Reception ==
Professional ratings
Aggregate scores
Source	Rating
AnyDecentMusic?	6.8/10
Metacritic	74/100
Review scores
Source	Rating
AllMusic	3.5/5 stars
Drowned in Sound	7/10
Pitchfork	7.6/10
PopMatters	8/10 stars
Sputnikmusic	4/5
Tiny Mix Tapes	4/5 stars

The album received mostly positive reviews with Pitchfork giving it 7.6/10. The aggregated score from 11 critics on Metacritic is a rating of 74/100.

== Trivia ==
The songs Inch of Dust and Vireo's Eye were used for the TV series Shameless.
