= Future Islands =

American synth-pop band

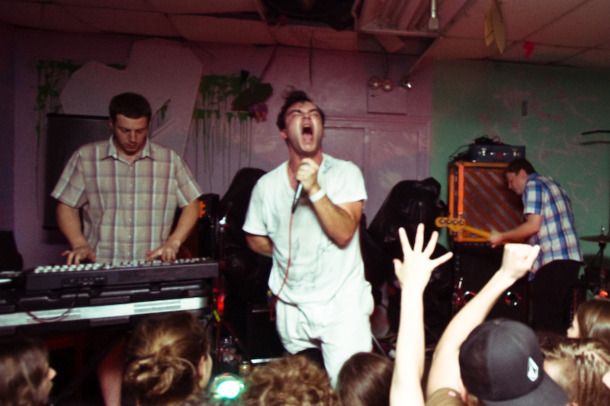
- Future Islands performing at Death By Audio in Brooklyn, February 2011

Background information
- Origin: Greenville, North Carolina, U.S.
- Genres: Synth-pop; new wave; post-punk; synth-rock; indie rock
- Years active: 2006–present
- Labels: 4AD; Thrill Jockey; Upset The Rhythm; Friends Records
- Members: Gerrit Welmers; William Cashion; Samuel T. Herring; Michael Lowry
- Past members: Erick Murillo
- Website: future-islands.com

Future Islands is an American synth-pop band that formed in Greenville, North Carolina, in 2006, later relocating to Baltimore, Maryland, in 2008. The band consists of Samuel T. Herring (vocals), Gerrit Welmers (keyboards, programming), William Cashion (bass, guitars) and Michael Lowry (drums).

The band was formed by Herring, Welmers and Cashion—the remaining members of the performance art college band Art Lord & the Self-Portraits—and drummer Erick Murillo. Murillo departed from the band after recording their debut album, Wave Like Home (2008). Continuing as a three-piece, the remaining trio released two further studio albums – In Evening Air (2010) and On the Water (2011) – to a growing cult fanbase and extensive touring.

Future Islands came to prominence in 2014 with their fourth album, Singles, released by 4AD. Its lead single "Seasons (Waiting on You)" was considered the best song of 2014 by Pitchfork and NME and its performance at the Late Show with David Letterman in March 2014 became the most-viewed video on the show's YouTube page and has been described as one of the best live performances of all time.

Ahead of recording their fifth studio album, The Far Field (2017), the band added session drummer Michael Lowry to its line-up. He became a core member of the band for their sixth studio album, As Long as You Are (2020). The band's seventh studio album, People Who Aren't There Anymore (2024), chronicled the dissolution of Herring's long-distance relationship across worldwide COVID-19 lockdowns.

== History ==
=== 2003–2005: Origins – Art Lord & the Self-Portraits ===
Sam Herring and Gerrit Welmers grew up in Morehead City, North Carolina, two streets away from each other, and attended the same middle school in Newport, North Carolina. They became friends around 1998, when they were in 8th grade. Herring had started making hip-hop music when he was 13 or 14, while Gerrit was a skater with interests in metal and punk music who bought his first guitar at age 14. Having different musical backgrounds, they did not consider making music together during high school. William Cashion started playing guitar when he was around 13, having had a couple of bands as a teenager in Raleigh, where he commuted to high school from Wendell, North Carolina. In 2002 he enrolled in the painting and drawing program at East Carolina University and had drawing classes with Sam Herring.

The idea to form a band came while Cashion was helping Herring study for an art history exam. They invited local record shop personality Adam Beeby to play rhythmic keyboards and fellow art student Kymia Nawabi for percussion and backing vocals. After a tumultuous debut on Valentine's Day February 14, 2003, at Soccer Moms' House, Herring also invited Welmers to join the band. Only Cashion and Welmers already played a musical instrument—the guitar—but Cashion took the bass and Welmers the keyboards, for a Kraftwerk-inspired sound.

Sam Herring played Locke Ernst-Frost, an arrogant narcissistic artist from Germany, Ohio, dressed in a 1970s-inspired white suit with slicked-back hair, and a heavy German accent. The character's name originally was meant to be Oarlock Ernest Frost but it got shortened as a reference to John Locke, the seventeenth-century philosopher; Max Ernst, the artist; and Robert Frost, the American poet.

The band quickly gained a local reputation and started touring the underground venues in the Southeast, playing shows with North Carolina acts like Valient Thorr and Baltimore artists such as Height, Videohippos, OCDJ, Nuclear Power Pants, Santa Dads, Ecstatic Sunshine, Blood Baby, Ponytail and electronic musician Dan Deacon whom they met during a show on May 26, 2004.

Nawabi who was already a senior when Cashion, Herring and Welmers were freshmen, left the band to prepare for her graduation project in June–July 2003. When Adam Beeby had to leave Greenville in September 2005, the remaining members dissolved the band.

=== 2006–2007: Formation – Little Advances ===
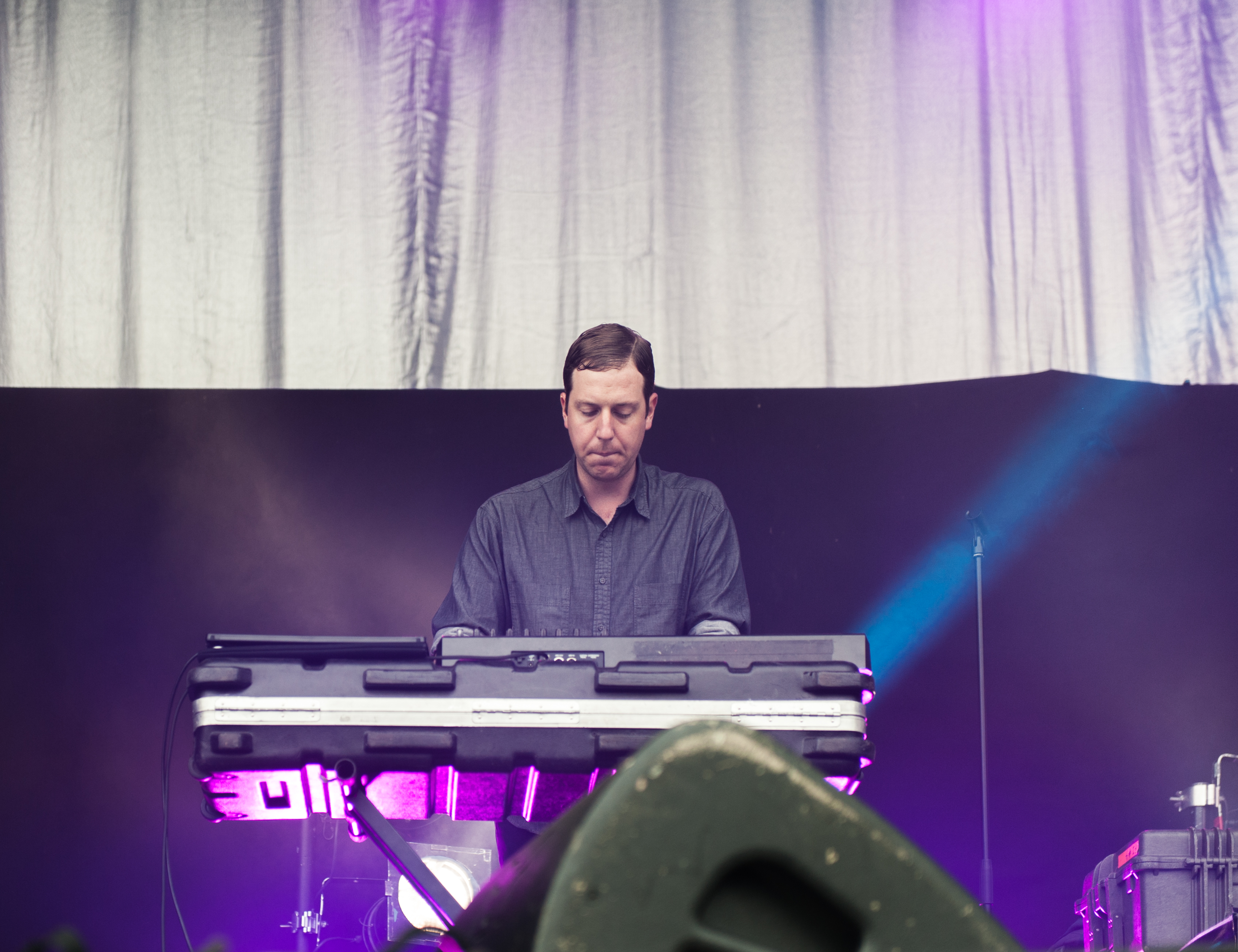
Keyboardist Gerrit Welmers at the Kosmonaut Festival (2015)

The name is meant to be vague. ... We were either gonna be called Already Islands or Future Shoes. Because, seriously, you don't know what future shoes look like, but you know you'd want a pair! (you know?). So after deciding Already Shoes was a bad name, we combined them to Future Islands. That's the boring truth, sorry!

— William Cashion, stated to BMore Musically Informed – September 30, 2009.

When Art Lord & the Self Portraits disbanded in late 2005, its members forgot they had discussed with alt-country band The Texas Governor the possibility of touring together. Future Islands was formed in early 2006 to keep that commitment, with an original line-up consisting of Cashion, Herring, Welmers and Erick Murillo—bassist for The Kickass—who played an electronic drum kit.

Already as Art Lord & the Self-Portraits, the band wanted to change their image and took this opportunity to do so. William Cashion stated: "Me and Gerrit had been talking for a while about how we wanted to get rid of the gimmick. We wanted to be taken seriously. Our songs had outgrown the gimmick that the band was made on. The songs were starting to deal with bigger, personal, universal themes. We wanted to be taken seriously."

The band played their first show on February 12, 2006, at an anti-Valentine's Day party in a venue called the Turducken house, opening for about a dozen bands. After writing 6–7 songs in only one week, they had to come up with a new name quickly, narrowing it down to two choices—Future Shoes and Already Islands—and combining them into one. Future Islands self-released the EP Little Advances on April 28, 2006, which they recorded in March 2006.

A couple of months later, Herring dropped out of college and left Greenville to deal with a substance abuse problem he had acquired: "In June, I left town and didn't come back. It was just drug problems, man. I got sucked into the darkness of partying and shit college kids do. I came clean to my parents and said, 'Look, I have a problem and need your help.' I stayed at my parent's for about a month and then moved across the state to Asheville, North Carolina. It took about a year for me to get my act together."

The band still continued and on January 6, 2007, they self-released a split CD with Welmers' solo project Moss of Aura, recorded in December 2006.

=== 2007–2008: Wave Like Home ===
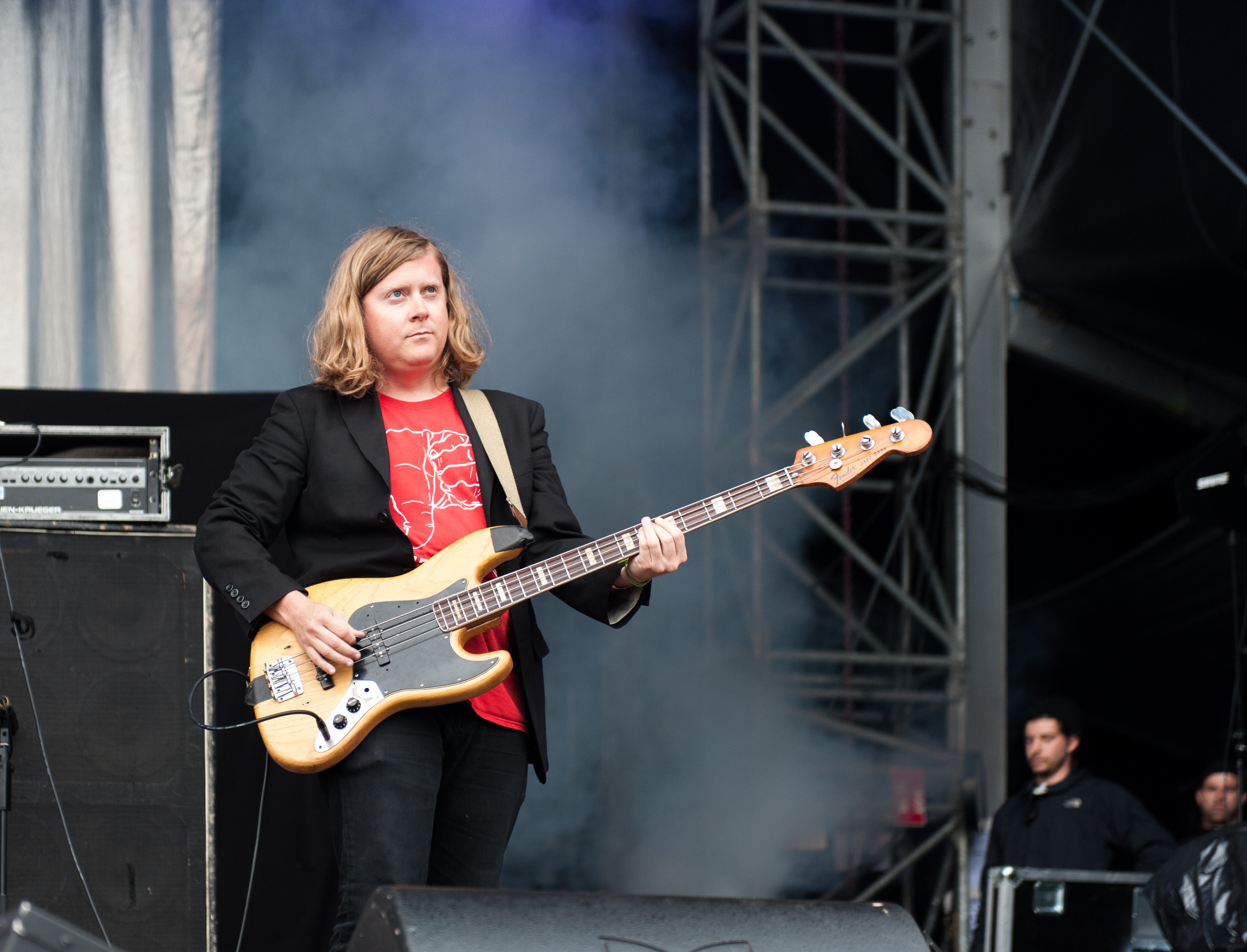
Bassist William Cashion at the Kosmonaut Festival (2015)

In July 2007, Future Islands recorded their debut album Wave Like Home with Chester Endersby Gwazda at Backdoor Skateshop in Greenville. As Cashion describes: "When we did Wave Like Home, we were working with a really tight schedule. Sam lived in Asheville and could only be in Greenville to record for a week or so, and we had to work very fast. We recorded the whole album in 3 days, and we spent about a month mixing it."

After a Halloween party in 2007, Erick Murillo quit the band. Having finished his degree, Cashion moved back to Raleigh: "We were scattered across North Carolina. I was living in Raleigh on friends' couches, Gerrit was in Greenville and Sam was in Asheville, which was five hours away." Between November 2007 and June 2008, Future Islands—encouraged by Dan Deacon and Benny Boeldt from Baltimore band Adventure—relocated to Baltimore. Cashion moved in November, Herring in January and finally Welmers. There, they could have access to cheap rent, be part of a supportive community and be closer to cities like New York, Philadelphia, and Washington, which allowed them to tour more extensively.

During the first half of 2008, the band added another drummer, Sam Ortiz from the Baltimore band Thrust Lab, who left weeks before the start of their first national tour in late July. On August 5, 2008, the band released the track "Follow You (Pangea Version)" as part of a split 7-inch with Deacon, through the label 307 Knox Records. Future Islands' track on the EP "Follow You (Pangea version)" was recorded in April 2006 at the Bonque house in Greenville, North Carolina during the Pangea sessions: the band's first proper session with Chester Endersby Gwazda.

London-based label Upset The Rhythm released Wave Like Home on August 25, 2008, which made sales difficult in the US due to the import costs. The cover art was designed by Kymia Nawabi, a former member of Art Lord & the Self-Portraits. She also designed the cover art of the Feathers and Hallways 7-inch which was recorded in Oakland, California, on July 21, 2008, during their first U.S. tour. Produced by Chester Endersby Gwazda, it was released on April 15, 2009, by Upset The Rhythm. This single was their first release as a focused three-piece: "We have definitely talked about adding a drummer at some point, when the time is right, but right now it just makes sense to be a three piece if, for nothing else, the fact that it is really easy to tour as a three piece. We really have very little gear. We really just have PA speakers for the keyboard and a bass amp."

=== 2008–2010: In Evening Air ===
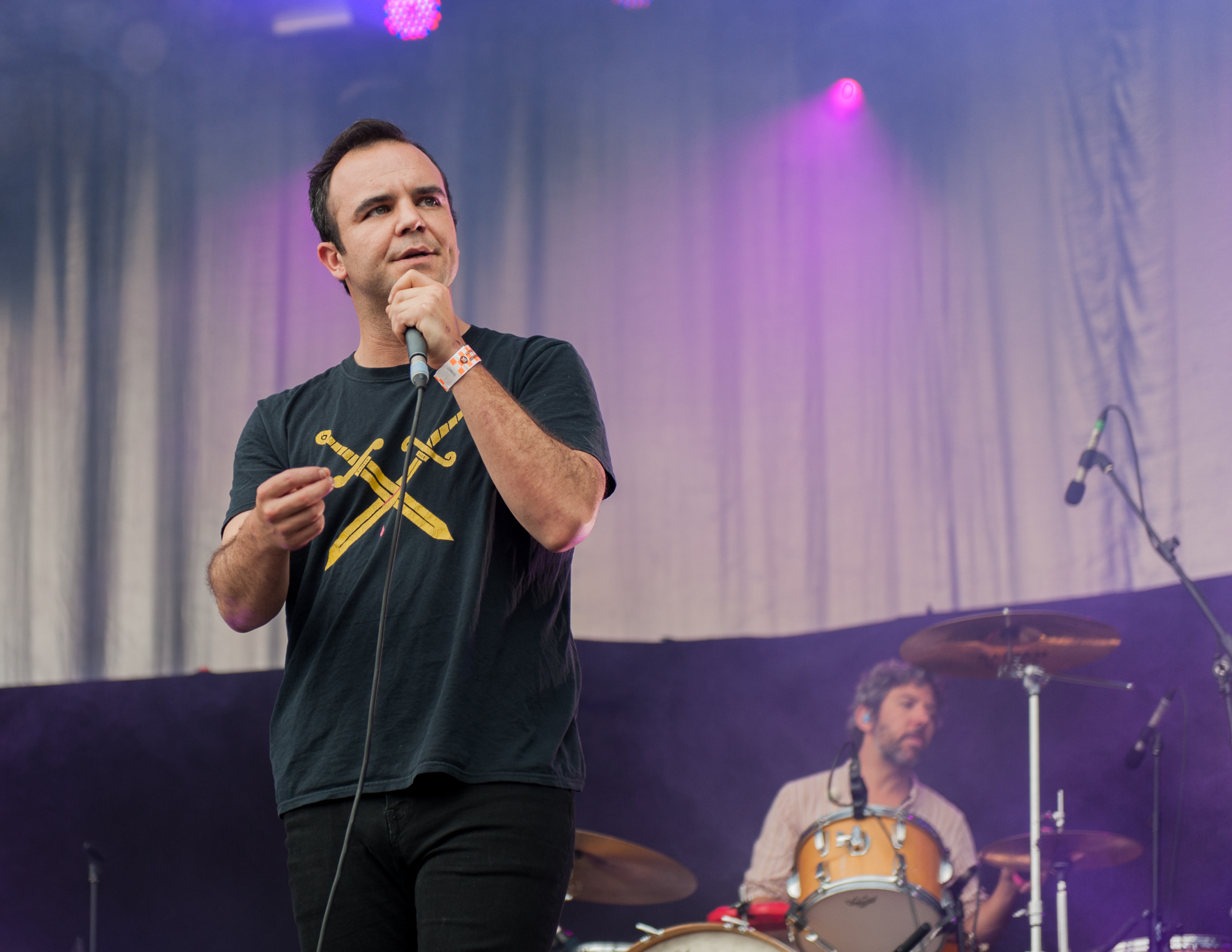
Frontman Sam Herring in 2015 at the Kosmonaut Festival, Germany, wearing a Double Dagger T-shirt

Sample of the song "Tin Man" from Future Islands' album In Evening Air

The strain of the band's first two consecutive national tours led to the end of Herring's long-term relationship in late 2008. This became the theme of Future Islands' second album In Evening Air whose first songs were written right after the breakup. In early 2009, the band toured Europe for the first time. The song "Tin Man" took the band through Dan Deacon's Bromst US and European tour.

Later that year, the band signed to independent record company Thrill Jockey. It was Double Dagger's bassist Bruce Willen who was responsible for giving the label a demo that contained early mixes of "Tin Man", "Walking Through That Door", "Long Flight" and "As I Fall". Future Islands began writing the rest of the album after Whartscape 2009 and recorded it in the band's living room in the historic Marble Hill neighborhood in Baltimore, with Chester Enderby Gwazda in July 2009. Released May 4, 2010, the cover art was again designed by Kymia Nawabi.

In February 2010, Future Islands released through the NYC art collective Free Danger the EP The Post Office Chapel Wave with remixes by Pictureplane, Javelin, Jones and Moss Of Aura, and collaborations with No Age and Victoria Legrand from Beach House. Future Islands debut with Thrill Jockey was the EP In the Fall released in April 2010 and produced by Chester Enderby Gwazda. Its title track featured vocals by Katrina Ford from Celebration. The EP also included an extended version of "Tin Man", a 2007 track "Virgo Distracts" and "Awake and Dreaming" which had been written for In Evening Air but did not fit the mood of the album. The cover art was shot by Bruce Willen from Post Typography.

Interested in expanding their sound, on July 7, 2010, the band recorded Undressed, an acoustic EP at Mobtown Studios, Baltimore for a radio broadcast. Produced by Mat Leffler-Schulman, the art cover was again designed by Kymia Nawabi. Played live at an art opening and at Whartscape 2010, the EP was released in September of that year: "We had been talking about arranging and performing an acoustic show for a while, and in the summer of 2010, Elena Johnston and Natasha Tylea invited us to do an acoustic performance at the opening of the "Wild Nothing" photography show that they curated. We got some friends together and figured out the acoustic versions."

On November 4, 2010, Future Islands released a split 7-inch with the Raleigh band Lonnie Walker featuring the track "The Ink Well". The cover art was by Elena Johnston and the single lead to the creation of the Baltimore independent label Friends Records.

=== 2011–2012: On the Water ===
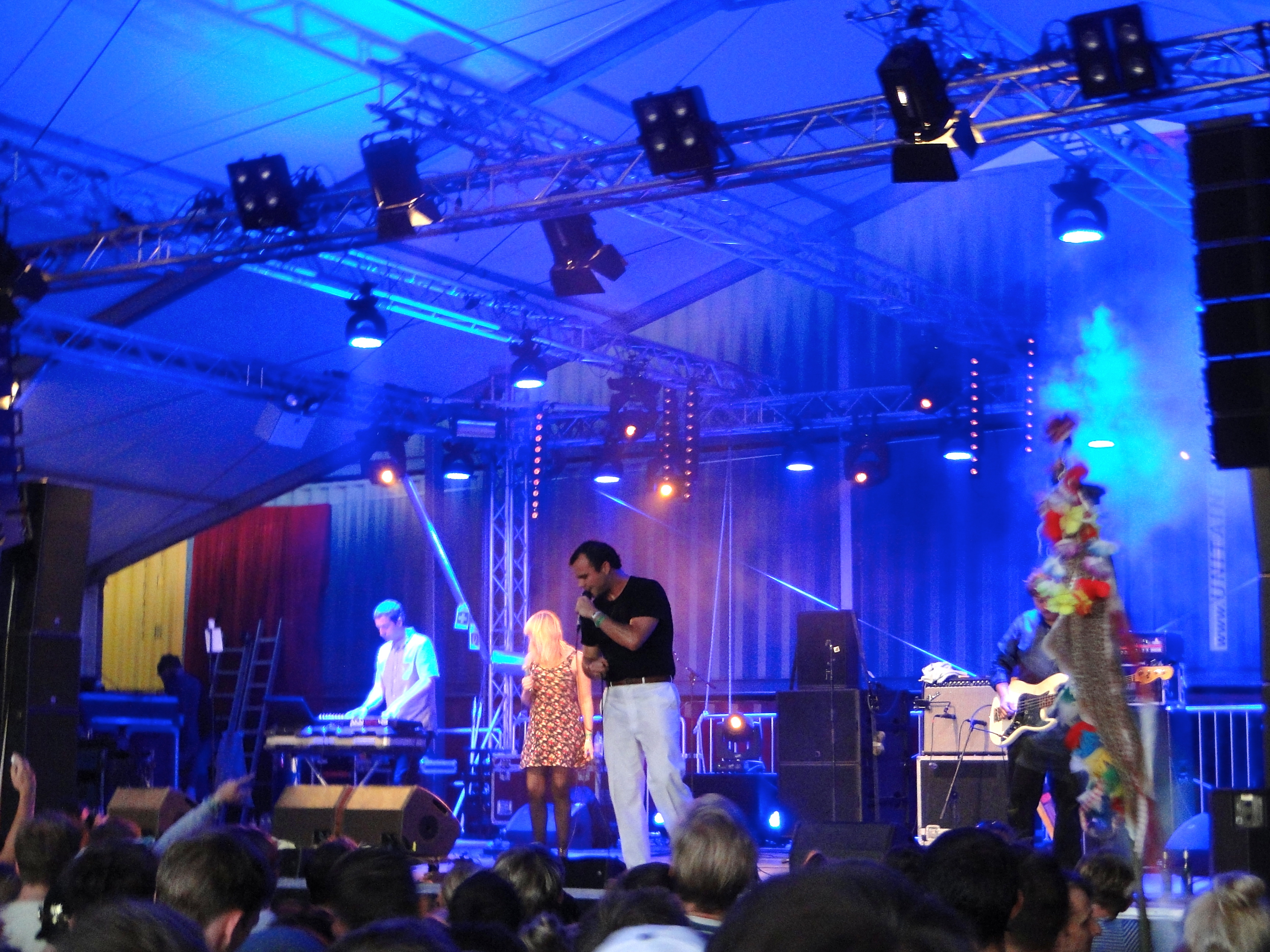
Future Islands in 2012 at the Dockville festival in Hamburg, Germany

Following a year of solid touring, Future Islands recorded their third album On the Water in Elizabeth City, North Carolina, between late May and early June 2011 with producer Chester Endersby Gwazda. William Cashion commented "Being secluded and free from distractions was the most important aspect of our going to North Carolina. Our friend Abe [Sanders] pretty much let us take over his house for ten days, and that gave us a lot of freedom to focus on writing and recording."

Sample of the song "Grease" from Future Islands' album On the Water

Not wanting to be pigeonholed, the band went against the expectation generated by In Evening Air, and the upbeat tone of the previous album was followed by a slow-burning record. Welmers' dance-floor-ready synthesizer and Cashion's uptempo bass were stripped down. The tone of the lyrics changed, according to Herring: "Because I didn't have that same anger, so I don't write about it."

Friction between the band and Thrill Jockey started to appear during the recording sessions, as Herring commented: "We had some issues. There was someone from the label hanging around talking about deadlines. Can we not talk about business while writing a song? Do you want it to be a good album, or do you want it to come out on time?"

Pressured by their label, the band rushed the mix and promotion of the album. The lead single "Before the Bridge/Find Love" was released on July 19, 2011, and the album on October 11, 2011. It featured a duet with Jenn Wasner from Wye Oak on the track "The Great Fire" and the art cover was designed by Baltimore artist Elena Johnston. After one year of touring On the Water, the band broke ties with their label.

On July 17, 2012, Future Islands released a charity split single with Baltimore band Ed Schrader's Music Beat through Famous Class records, featuring the song "Cotton Flower" and on September 3, 2012, they released the single "Tomorrow/The Fountain" through their previous label—Upset the Rhythm.

=== 2013–2015: Singles ===
Having toured for five consecutive years, in 2013 Future Islands was finally able to afford taking a break from the road, to write their fourth album: "We sank everything we had into [Singles]. It's definitely our most polished record. We were able to take time off the road because of the money we had saved from years of touring, so were able to write while not under the pressure of being in between tours."

They started writing in February 2013 in a rented hunting cabin in rural North Carolina, while rehearsing for the tenth anniversary of Art Lord & the Self-Portraits' first show. About the writing process, Herring described: "We ended up demoing about 24 or 25 songs, then went into the studio and decided to do 13 of those, and by the end of it we decided it would be a ten-track record. The writing process started in February – there were two or three songs that we had from the year before that we'd demoed – we stopped writing in the last week of July, and went into the studio in the first week of August. So there was a good five and a half, six months of writing, and getting together two or three times a week over that period to just jam and see what came up."

The band financed the album and recorded it at the Dreamland Recording Studios in Hurley, New York, in August 2013 with producer Chris Coady. In early 2014, the Future Islands announced they had signed a three-album deal to 4AD, who released Singles on March 24, 2014. The cover art was by mixed media artist Beth Hoeckel.

Sample of the song "Seasons (Waiting on You)" from Future Islands' album Singles

The band made their network television début on March 3, 2014, on The Late Show with David Letterman, performing the lead single "Seasons (Waiting on You)". Their performance on the show, particularly Herring's onstage antics, became an internet success, and garnered millions of views on YouTube. "Seasons (Waiting on You)" was eventually named the best song of 2014 by Pitchfork Media, the Pazz & Jop critics' poll, and Consequence of Sound. The success of the album led the Singles tour to extend itself until November 2015.

In February 2015, Future Islands wrote the single "The Chase"/"Haunted by You" and recorded it in March with producer Jim Eno at Public Hi-Fi, Austin, Texas. The single was released on April 29, 2015, with a cover art by Lesser Gonzalez Alvarez.

=== 2016–2019: The Far Field ===
In 2016, Future Islands took a break from touring and started writing their fifth album in January, in the small beach town of Avon, in the Outer Banks, North Carolina. William Cashion stated: "We got a beach house on the outer banks of North Carolina in the dead of winter. There was nobody there but us. You could look out of any window of this four-storey house and you'd be able to see the ocean. We set up in the living room, we'd get up every day and start jamming after our morning coffee and just go all day. We wrote about eight songs there, and about three of them made it onto the record. From that point on, we'd get together in chunks – we'd go to our rehearsal space in Baltimore, or over to Gerrit's place or to my home studio. We tried to just write the way that we always have."

The band tested their songs live in August playing under different names: The Hidden Haven, named after the beach house where they started writing the album; This Old House, after the TV show Herring watched when growing up; and Chirping Bush, inspired by a disturbing dream Welmers had about a bunch of birds who could not get out of a bush. "We wanted to do little shows, but we didn't want any attention for the shows; we wanted to kind of do it under the radar."

Future Islands recorded The Far Field in November 2016 at the Sunset Sound Recorders studio in Los Angeles, California, with producer John Congleton. The album was released on April 7, 2017, and its lead single "Ran" came out on January 31, 2017, followed by the single "Cave" on March 24. The album featured a duet with Blondie's Debbie Harry. As in the album In Evening Air, the title comes from Theodore Roethke's poetry work and the cover art — a piece titled Chrysanthemum Trance — is again by Kymia Nawabi.

On September 1, 2019, the band previewed seven new songs during a show at the Pearl Street Nightclub in Northampton, Massachusetts. According to Stereogum, the unreleased tracks were "The Painter", "Hit The Coast", "Born In A War", "Days" (which would later be titled "Thrill"), "Birmingham" (which would later be titled "Waking"), "Plastic Beach" and "Moonlight".

=== 2020–present: As Long as You Are and People Who Aren't There Anymore ===
On July 8, 2020, the band released the new track "For Sure" with an accompanying video. On August 12, 2020, the band announced their album As Long as You Are would be released on October 8, 2020, and simultaneously released the single "Thrill". On September 15, 2020, they released the track "Moonlight" which is also on the album. The track "For Sure" was featured on the soundtrack of MLB The Show 21. It was also included on the soundtrack of eFootball 2022.

The band premiered a remix of the single "For Sure" by Dan Deacon on January 19, 2021. Future Islands appeared on the Late Show with Stephen Colbert on 15 February 2022, performing "King of Sweden". In mid-2023, they opened several shows for Weezer during their Indie Rock Road Trip tour.

Written and recorded across the COVID-19 pandemic, the band's seventh studio album People Who Aren't There Anymore was released on January 26, 2024. The album chronicles the dissolution of Herring's long-distance relationship across worldwide lockdowns. On May 22, 2026, the group released From a Hole in the Floor to a Fountain of Youth, a compilation album that is "a collection of deep cuts, rarities and live tracks." They completed a limited tour in support of the album in May 2026.

== Artistry ==
=== Musical style and influences ===
I don't think that any band really escapes the genre tag. ... We just gave ourself a tag that made sense to us just so we wouldn't be put in another category. We started calling ourselves post wave back in 2003 and it was kind of a joke ... We definitely don't want to be tagged as anything because we want to be open to as many people as possible.

— Sam Herring stated to The Quietus – October 18, 2012.

Future Islands' music style has been tagged as synth-pop, but the band has routinely rejected that classification, considering themselves as "post-wave", by combining the romanticism of new wave with the power and drive of post-punk. Their music style has been also described as synth-rock and indie rock.

The band's members came from very different musical backgrounds and sensibilities: Sam Herring grew up performing hip-hop, Gerrit Welmers was into punk rock and heavy metal and William Cashion was into indie rock, grunge, krautrock and new wave, so a lot of the band's synth-pop influences come from him. Cashion was also a big fan of The Cure and The Smashing Pumpkins, and was influenced by bassists Peter Hook from Joy Division and New Order, and Kim Deal from The Pixies and The Breeders.

While Welmers and Herring found common ground through Danzig and Kool Keith, it was through Kraftwerk's "Trans-Europe Express" which was sampled by Afrika Bambaataa that Cashion and Herring found some common ground when forming the Art Lord & the Self-Portraits. They explained:

"Our early influences were Kraftwerk and Joy Division and New Order, so it all kind of came from those sounds ... We were just using what we had at our disposal to create, and that were old Casio and Yamaha keyboards and a borrowed bass guitar, borrowed amps. We scraped together what we could to make music with, weird shakers and sound makers and stuff, and that just kind of led us down a road. These kinds of things defined us early on and we kept with that sound, kept painting with that palette."

Herring named Orchestral Manoeuvres in the Dark (OMD) as "one of the biggest influences on Future Islands". He said of their 1983 album, Dazzle Ships, "We all just fell in love with it. We couldn't stop listening to it, and it really just became a huge inspiration and influence in creating our second album In Evening Air." Cashion affirmed that the entire band has drawn inspiration from OMD's "immense heart and soul".

=== Songwriting and vocals ===
I've always considered myself a singer third on the list—I'm a writer, I'm a performer and I'm a singer. I don't really think of myself as a musician. Those are the things that are most important to me—that I perform well and write something that will stand some test of time and be there for people.

— Sam Herring stated to Paste Magazine – March 24, 2014.

In Future Islands writing process, Gerrit Welmers and William Cashion develop the music which Sam Herring responds to with the lyrics. Herring's sad lyrics often contrast with the upbeat mood of the music. He explains: "Where the songs have always been kind of upbeat and happy, the message is often melancholy. I like it that way, people's natural instinct is to let their guards down and dance, and then they actually let the words seep in. Instead of turning away from the darkness, they embrace the light and find the darkness. I think the opposite is true too."

Literary influences on Herring's writing include poet Theodore Roethke—whose last book of poems The Far Field names Future Islands' 2017 album and includes the "In Evening Air" poem that names their 2010 album—and poet Jack Gilbert: whose poem and anthology "The Great Fires" names one of the band's songs. Herring also admitted being influenced by Italo Calvino's prose during the time he wrote the single "The Fountain".

In the spring of 2014, Sam Herring was diagnosed with Reinke's edema. According to him "There's four causes. Acid reflux, smoking, talking too much or overuse of the vocal cords, and then chronic misuse of the vocal cords ... which is how I sing. So, basically, I was four for four." Herring started compensating for the fact that he can no longer hit certain notes by growling, which in turn became distinctive on his vocals.

=== Live performances ===
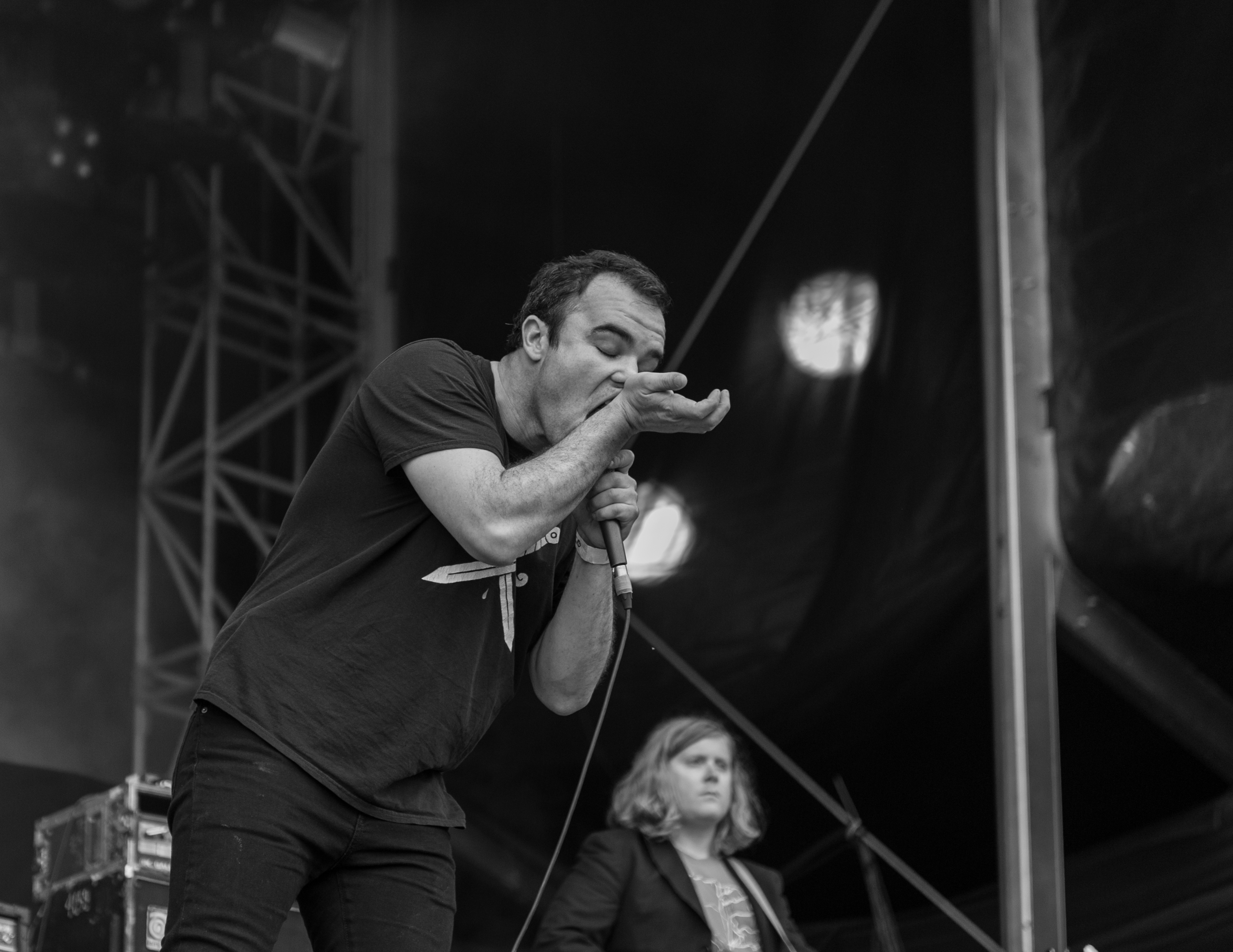
Sam Herring at the Kosmonaut Festival (2015)

More than a studio band, Future Islands define themselves as a live band and have toured extensively. Frontman Sam Herring is known by his stage performances. According to William Cashion "A lot of the energy of the show comes from the audience. If the audience is putting off energy, we're able to bounce it back. It's like a feedback loop. If the audience is there with us and they're giving us their energy, then it'll be easy for us to find it."

The style and presentation of the Art Lord & the Self-Portraits was determined by the art school backgrounds of its members: the band was meant to be a performance art piece. Herring has cited Ian Curtis, James Brown and Elvis Presley. as influences but his background in performance art and conceptual art also became reflected in his stage presence, even for Future Islands.

"I fell in love with performance art when I was 17 and that was the thing that I found: I just would sit and draw for 20 hours straight and make this thing photorealistic and then put it on a board and then people see it and that's it, or you can stand on the street and perform for 30 minutes with some weird thing you came up with off the top of your head, act out a play to no one but people are going to walk by and you're going to get a reaction. They may not get what you're doing or care about what you're doing, but there's something, you sparked something in their heads. And that's an exciting thing, to look into people's eyes. There's no expectation—you can create a memory for people, like I said, good or bad. It can grab people and that's a cool thing."

Herring's dedication to stage performance has not been without physical consequences. When touring Europe as part of the Dan Deacon Ensemble supporting the album Bromst, Herring was tackled by a drunken spectator in Paris. Six months later he realized he had torn his anterior cruciate ligament and underwent surgery in February 2010, continuing to perform shows in the following months wearing a knee brace, which can be seen on the June 24, 2010 Amoeba show footage. In 2014 Herring passed out at the airport on his way to Primavera festival due to exhaustion. Being revived by medics, he still made his plane and played the show that night. In 2015, he tore a meniscus while doing a knee drop when opening for Morrissey at Red Rocks on July 16, but the band completed the remaining four months of the Singles tour.

=== Touring ===
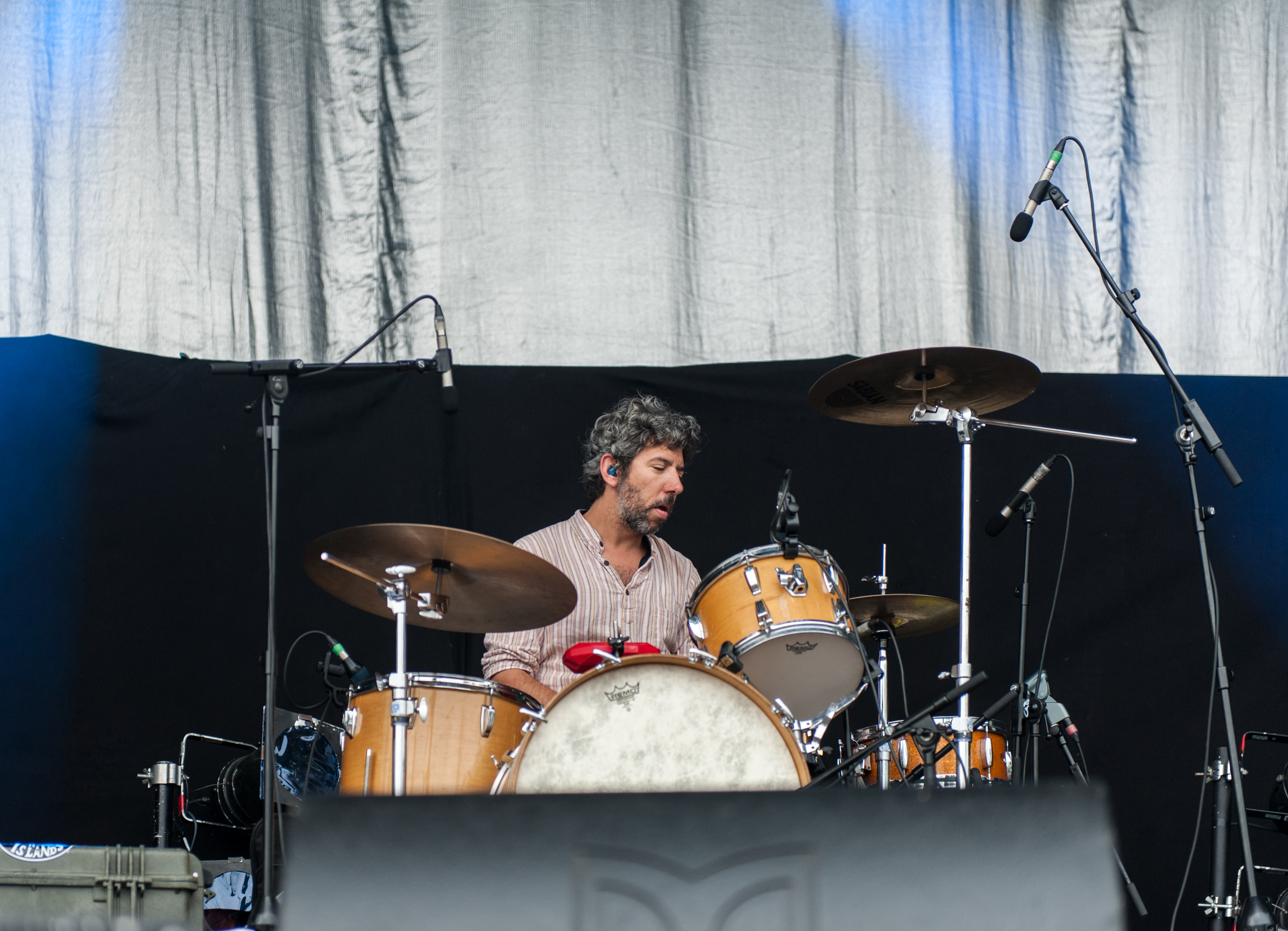
Drummer Mike Lowry at the Kosmonaut Festival (2015)

Future Islands has performed over 1,000 shows in their first 10 years. Since 2013, the band has included a drummer in its tours. In late 2013 and early 2014 it was Double Dagger's former drummer Denny Bowen who had already played drums and percussion on Future Islands albums In Evening Air, On the Water and Singles among some EPs and singles. In the spring of 2014, due to tour schedule conflicts between Future Islands and his own band Roomrunner, Bowen was replaced by Mike Lowry from Baltimore bands Lake Trout and Mt. Royal. Lowry was also part of The Far Field studio sessions.

"Our shows are all about creating a really energetic vibe, a physical thing, and we want more people to move – that's the big thing. We either want them to move, or be moved by the music. It was never weird to us that we didn't have a drummer, but to some people it was – they'd be like: "Where the hell are the drums coming from?"

Future Islands have opened for Morrissey, Grace Jones, Phantogram, Titus Andronicus and Okkervil River. They have performed at festivals such as Latitude, Great Escape, Primavera Sound, Glastonbury, Coachella, Øyafestivalen, Sziget, Bonnaroo, Sasquatch!, and SXSW, among others.

=== Cover artwork ===
Coming from an art background Future Islands attribute importance to their albums' cover artwork. William Cashion stated: "I think having good artwork is a big deal for any record. I think if a record has bad artwork I will just dismiss it, I just won't even give it a chance. I think a lot of people share that opinion, that artwork is very important." Future Islands' cover artwork has been delegated to different artists, as Sam Herring explains: "As projects pop up, we decide what artistic styles best speak to the music and the medium, then decide on artists. We primarily choose friends' work, though, people who we've become intimate with as friends. I think that pulls something deeper out of the whole, working with loved ones. You give birth to something bigger than yourself when you involve other people's ideas and minds. That's always a good thing."

Kymia Nawabi made the cover art for Wave Like Home, Feathers & Hallways (single), In Evening Air, Undressed (EP), and The Far Field. She is the most recurrent artist and is based in Brooklyn. She was a band member of the proto-Future Islands band Art Lord & the Self-Portraits and directed the video of "Walking Through that Door" in stop-motion animation. William Cashion commented "Our friend Kymia ... as I said, we write and record in our own world and she kind of makes ... her artwork is definitely in her own world, in a way. The images she uses are all her own. We went to college with her and we've always admired her work and we love working with her. She also did the cover for the new EP and the Feathers & Hallways EP. We definitely put a lot of weight on the art, and we want to make the albums look as good as they sound."

Elena Johnston created the cover art for On the Water, Future Islands / Lonnie Walker split 7-inch, Dream of You and Me single. She co-directed with William Cashion the video of "Dream of You and Me" and is the creator of the large canvas seen in the background of the interior scenes of the video "Ran". About the On the Water art cover William Cashion stated: "We decided that we wanted the album art to be loose and abstract for this album ... We wanted washes of color. The cover is actually an excerpt of a painting that Elena had already created." In another interview he added "It was great working with her. The piece wasn't made specifically for the album. We chose it from a series of paintings and drawings. She handled most of the typography on the album as well."

== Band members ==
Current members

- William Cashion – bass, guitar (2006–present)
- Samuel T. Herring – vocals (2006–present)
- Gerrit Welmers – keyboards, programming (2006–present); guitar (2011–present)
- Michael Lowry – drums (2020–present; touring musician 2014, 2014–2019)

Former members

- Erick Murillo – drums (2006–2007)
- Samuel N. Ortiz-Payero – drums (2008)
- Denny Bowen – drums (2009–2013; in-studio, 2013–2014, 2014; touring)

== Discography ==
Studio albums

- Wave Like Home (2008)
- In Evening Air (2010)
- On the Water (2011)
- Singles (2014)
- The Far Field (2017)
- As Long as You Are (2020)
- People Who Aren't There Anymore (2024)

Compilation albums

- From a Hole in the Floor to a Fountain of Youth (2026)

== Related projects ==
Moss of Aura
Keyboardist Gerrit Welmers has been writing solo as 'Moss of Aura' since 2006. After releasing five albums on cassette, Moss of Aura released the LP Wading in 2012 and We'll All Collide in 2016 through Friends Records.

The Snails
In 2008, Sam Herring and William Cashion started a parallel project called The Snails with members of other Baltimore bands. Their releases took place during Future Islands tour breaks: debut EP Worth the Wait came out in April 2013. In February 2016, they released their debut album Songs from The Shoebox.

Peals
In early 2012, William Cashion formed Peals with Double Dagger's former bassist Bruce Willen, releasing their debut album Walking Field in May 2013. In 2016 they released the album Honey through Friends Records.

Samuel T. Herring and Hemlock Ernst
Samuel T. Herring uses the stage name Hemlock Ernst when performing rap, the name Ernst coming from his Art Lord & the Self-Portraits character. He has appeared on collaborative hip-hop releases by Milo/Scallops Hotel, Busdriver, Open Mike Eagle among others. He teamed up with producer Madlib for a rap project named Trouble knows Me, they released an EP in 2015.

As Samuel T. Herring, he has collaborated with Double Dagger, Microkingdom, Beth Jeans Houghton/Du Blonde, Gangrene, BadBadNotGood, Clams Casino and Celebration.

== Awards and nominations ==
Year	Ceremony	Category	Work	Result	Ref
2014	AIM Awards	Independent Breakthrough of the Year	Future Islands	Nominated	
2014	AIM Awards	Independent Track of the Year	"Seasons (Waiting On You)"	Nominated	
2016	Libera Awards	Best Live Act	Future Islands	Nominated	
