= Singles (Future Islands album) =

Studio album by Future Islands
- Released: March 24, 2014
- Recorded: August 2013
- Studio: Dreamland (Hurley, New York)
- Genre: Synth-pop; new wave; indie pop
- Length: 42:11
- Label: 4AD
- Producer: Chris Coady

Future Islands chronology
On the Water (2011)	Singles (2014)	The Far Field (2017)

Singles from Singles
- 1. "Seasons (Waiting on You)" Released: February 4, 2014; 2. "A Dream of You and Me" Released: February 3, 2015

Singles is the fourth studio album by American synthpop band Future Islands, released on March 24, 2014 through 4AD Records. The album's lead single "Seasons (Waiting on You)" was picked as the best track of 2014 by NME, Pitchfork Media and Spin.

== Critical reception ==
Professional ratings
Aggregate scores
Source	Rating
AnyDecentMusic?	7.8/10
Metacritic	82/100
Review scores
Source	Rating
AllMusic	5/5 stars
The Daily Telegraph	4/5 stars
Entertainment Weekly	B+
The Guardian	4/5 stars
Mojo	4/5 stars
NME	8/10
Pitchfork	8.0/10
Q	4/5 stars
Rolling Stone	3.5/5 stars
Spin	8/10

Singles received acclaim from contemporary music critics. At Metacritic, which assigns a normalized rating out of 100 to reviews from mainstream critics, the album received an average score of 82, based on 32 reviews, which indicates "universal acclaim".

== Track listing ==
All tracks are written by Future Islands.

No.	Title	Length
1.	"Seasons (Waiting on You)"	3:46
2.	"Spirit"	4:22
3.	"Sun in the Morning"	3:48
4.	"Doves"	3:28
5.	"Back in the Tall Grass"	4:15
6.	"A Song for Our Grandfathers"	4:55
7.	"Light House"	4:46
8.	"Like the Moon"	4:40
9.	"Fall from Grace"	4:15
10.	"A Dream of You and Me"	3:50

== Charts ==
Chart (2014–16)	Peak position
Australian Albums (ARIA)	60
Belgian Albums (Ultratop Flanders)	51
Danish Albums (Hitlisten)	32
UK Albums (OCC)	34
US Billboard 200	40
US Top Alternative Albums (Billboard)	10
US Top Rock Albums (Billboard)	11

== Certifications ==
Region	Certification	Certified units/sales
United Kingdom (BPI)	Gold	100,000^{‡}
^{‡} Sales+streaming figures based on certification alone.
