= Samuel T. Herring =

American singer (born 1984)

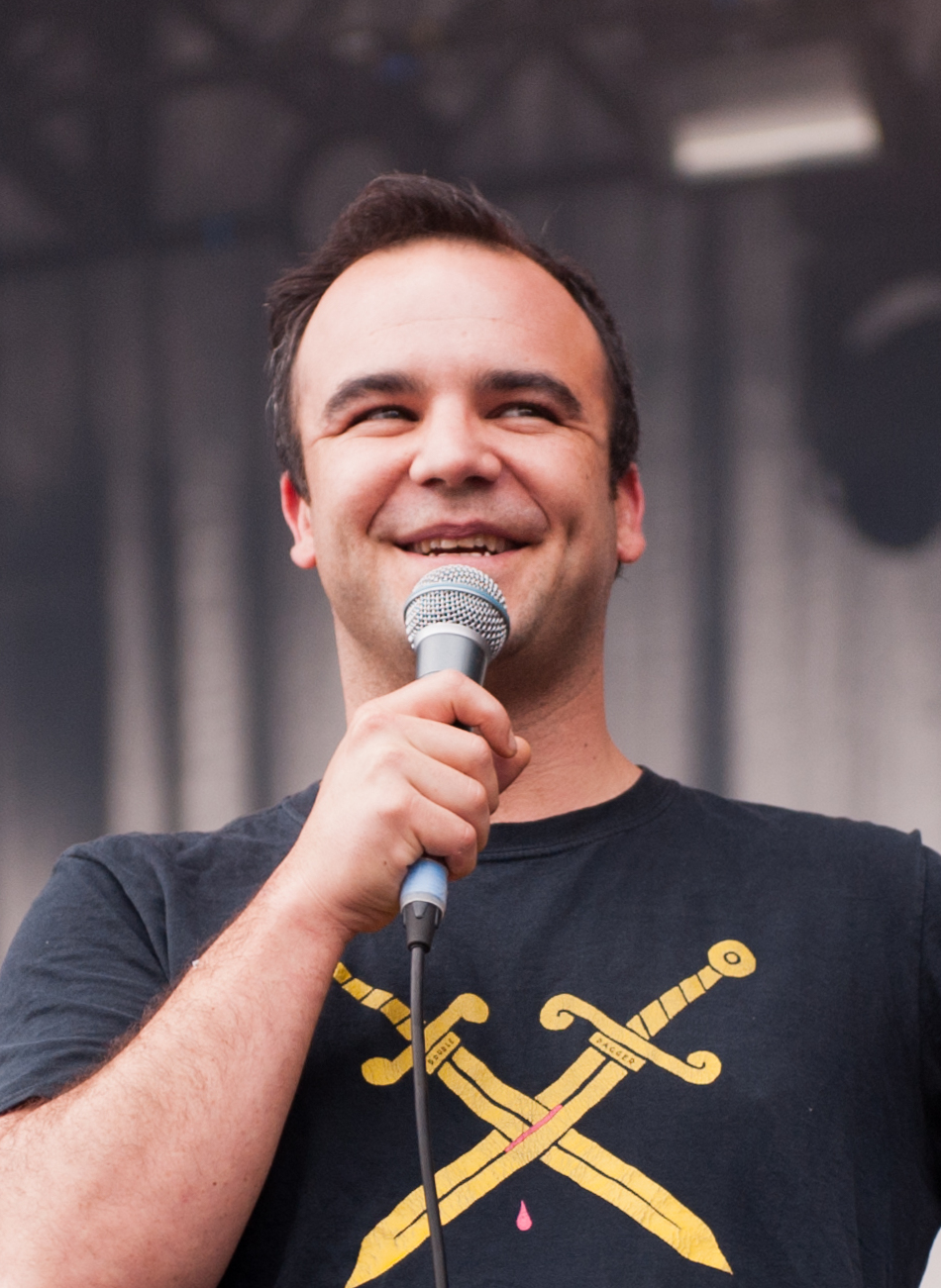
- Herring in 2015

Background information
- Also known as: Hemlock Ernst
- Born: Samuel Thompson Herring; April 13, 1984 (age 42); Morehead City, North Carolina, U.S.
- Origin: Newport, North Carolina, U.S.
- Genres: Synthpop; hip hop; alternative rock; indie pop
- Occupations: Singer; rapper; actor
- Instruments: Vocals
- Years active: 2003–present
- Labels: Madlib Invazion; Ruby Yacht

Samuel Thompson Herring (born April 13, 1984), also known as Hemlock Ernst, is an American singer, rapper and actor based in Baltimore, Maryland. He is best known as the frontman of the synth-pop band Future Islands, with whom he has recorded seven studio albums. He has also previously been a member of Art Lord & the Self-Portraits, The Snails, and Trouble Knows Me.

In 2023, Herring starred in the Apple TV horror fantasy television series, The Changeling, alongside LaKeith Stanfield and Adina Porter.

== Early life ==
Born in Carteret County, North Carolina, Herring grew up in Newport and Morehead City. He has 1/4 roots from the Philippines, from his mother's side. He began rapping at age 14 at freestyle battles and cyphers. In 2002, he enrolled at East Carolina University. Herring is a keen football (soccer) fan and an avid supporter of Everton F.C.

== Career ==
In 2003, while attending East Carolina University, Herring and other colleagues started the performance art band Art Lord & the Self-Portraits, which lasted until 2005. Some of its former members started Future Islands in 2006, and the band relocated to Baltimore, Maryland in 2008. In 2013, Herring took a break from the band's touring in order to spend more time on his solo rap project, writing more, and doing more shows.

Parallel to Future Islands, Herring continued rapping either solo, under the moniker Hemlock Ernst, or with his brother as Flesh Epic. Hemlock was his original writing name on an on-line music board when he was in the 9th grade, from a poem he wrote about Socrates taking the hemlock poison. Ernst comes from his character in Art Lord & the Self-Portraits who was named Locke Ernst-Frost: a reference to the religious poet John Locke, the artist Max Ernst, and the American poet Robert Frost.

In 2015, Hemlock Ernst teamed up with producer Madlib for a new rap project called Trouble Knows Me. Entirely produced by Madlib, the self-titled EP was released via Madlib Invazion on September 1, 2015. It was pre-sold at Madlib's show at The Mid in Chicago, Illinois on July 17, 2015, as well as Rappcats' website and a Rappcats popup shop. On March 24, 2016, British musician Four Tet sat in for Benji B on BBC Radio 1 and played "Rings in the Coffee", an unreleased track by Trouble Knows Me.

On October 25, 2019, he released a rap album, Back at the House, via Ruby Yacht under the moniker Hemlock Ernst. It was entirely produced by Kenny Segal.

In June 2022, Deadline announced Herring had joined the cast of the Apple+ series The Changeling; Season 1 of the show premiered in September 2023, in which Herring made his acting debut as William Wheeler.

On September 29, 2023, the Hemlock Ernst album The Fall Collection was released on the Alpha Pup label. Produced by Height Keech.

== Discography ==
=== Studio albums ===
- Back at the House (2019) (with Kenny Segal, as Hemlock Ernst & Kenny Segal)

=== EPs ===
- Trouble Knows Me (2015) (with Madlib, as Trouble Knows Me)

=== Singles ===
- "Down" (2019) (with Kenny Segal, as Hemlock Ernst & Kenny Segal)

=== Guest appearances as Samuel T. Herring ===
- Double Dagger — "The Lie/The Truth" from More (2009)
- Microkingdom — "I'm on Fire" (2012)
- Beth Jeans Houghton — "Pelican Canyon" (2014)
- Du Blonde — "Mind Is on My Mind" from Welcome Back to Milk (2015)
- Gangrene — "Play It Cool" from Welcome to Los Santos (2015)
- BadBadNotGood — "Time Moves Slow" from IV (2016)
- Clams Casino — "Ghost in a Kiss" from 32 Levels (2016)
- Celebration — "Paper Trails" from Wounded Healer (2017)
- BadBadNotGood — "I Don't Know" (2017)
- Nina Kinert — "Chapped Lips" from Romantic (2018)
- DJ Shadow — "Our Pathetic Age" from Our Pathetic Age (2019)
- PBDY — "Tears or Rain" from Careworn (2019)
- Chaunter — "Lightning Games" from Dream Dynamics (2019)
- Kennebec — "Leaving the Canyons" (2022)
- billy woods & Kenny Segal — "Facetime" (2023)
- Amtrac - "Domino" (2023)

=== Guest appearances as Hemlock Ernst ===
- Rapdragons — "Gotta Go" from Featuring Baltimore (2010)
- Scallops Hotel — "Lavender Chunk" from Plain Speaking (2015)
- 83cutlass — "Wicked Kingdom" (2015)
- Milo — "Souvenir" from So the Flies Don't Come (2015)
- Busdriver — "Ministry of the Torture Couch" from Thumbs (2015)
- Cavanaugh — "Typecast" and "Lemons" from Time and Materials (2015)
- Curse ov Dialect — "Twisted Strangers" from Twisted Strangers (2016)
- Open Mike Eagle & Paul White — "Protectors of the Heat" from Hella Personal Film Festival (2016)
- Words Hurt — "This Is Where I Leave You" (2016)
- Boy Legs — "Something Out There" from Pinball Museum (2016)
- Watercolor Warewolf — "Wwhat U Wwaitin 4" from AM Nights: 92.3 the Beast (2016)
- Charge It to the Game — "Bite Me" from Urban Hall of Fame (2016)
- JPEGMafia — "Llama Mind" from The 2nd Amendment (2016)
- Bond St. District — "Terror Era" from A Church on Vulcan (2016)
- Drew Scott — "Porcelain" and "Dead Cupid" from Ill Vessel (2017)
- Passage — "Krang (Total Reduction Remix)" from Worked On (2017)
- Billy Woods — "Illegal Tints" (2017)
- Busdriver — "Tiny Infinities" from Electricity Is on Our Side (2018)
- Mister and Curt Cataract — "Approaching Land" from Approaching Land (2019)
- Blockhead — "Blue Veil" from Free Sweatpants (2019)
- R.A.P. Ferreira — "Export The Conundrum" from the truly ancient and original lefthanded styles of the hoodwinkers and penny pinchers (2019)
- Otis Mensah — "Breath of Life" (2020)
- Blu & Fatlip — "Good For The Soul" from Live From The End Of The World (2023)
- Open Mike Eagle & Kenny Segal — "Unfinished Concrete Initials" from DOOMED (2026)
