= Kaytranada discography =

- Studio albums: 4
- EPs: 3
- Singles: 38
- B-sides: 3
- Mixtapes: 12
- Collaborations (as The Celestics and other): 8
- Remix compilations: 2

Active since 2010, Kaytranada has released four studio albums, two studio EPs, numerous singles and beat tapes. At first he went under the name Kaytranada, releasing a series of mixtapes. He released his first studio album, 99.9%, in 2016, which he followed up with the Grammy-winner Bubba in 2019.

== Albums ==
=== Studio albums ===
List of albums, with selected details and chart positions
| Title | Details | Peak chart positions | | | | | | | | | Certifications |
| Title | Details | CAN | AUS | NZ | UK | US | US Dance | US R&B | US R&B/HH | US Ind. | Certifications |
|---|---|---|---|---|---|---|---|---|---|---|---|
| 99.9% | Released: May 6, 2016; Label: XL; Formats: CD, LP, digital download | 24 | 21 | 31 | 31 | 73 | 2 | — | — | 7 | BPI: Silver; RMNZ: Platinum |
| Bubba | Released: December 13, 2019; Label: RCA; Formats: LP, digital download | 21 | 53 | 39 | 68 | 56 | 1 | 8 | 23 | — | BPI: Silver |
| Timeless | Released: June 7, 2024; Label: RCA; Formats: CD, LP, digital download | 30 | 42 | 25 | 41 | 28 | 2 | 2 | 6 | — | |
| Ain't No Damn Way! | Released: August 15, 2025; Label: RCA; Formats: CD, LP, digital download | — | — | — | — | — | 8 | — | — | — | |
"—" denotes album that did not chart or was not released

=== Mixtapes ===
List of beat tapes and mixtapes, with selected details
| Title | Year | Details |
|---|---|---|
| Kaytra da Mouse | 2010 | Released: April 2010; Credited as Kaytradamus |
| The Weather Report | 2010 | Released: August 23, 2010; Credited as Kaytradamus |
| Teriphikness | 2010 | Released: December 1, 2010; Credited as Kaytradamus |
| Merrymaking Music | 2011 | Released: June 28, 2011; Credited as Kaytradamus |
| Kaytra LaBoom | 2011 | Released: August 22, 2011; Credited as Kaytradamus |
| Kaytra Nada | 2011 | Released: February 26, 2012; Credited as Kaytradamus |
| Kaytrap EP | 2012 | Released: July 12, 2012; Credited as Kaytradamus |
| Spring Mixtape For Bromance | 2013 | Released: October 31, 2014; Distributor: Bromance; Formats: CD, digital |
| Instrumental Hip Hop Is Dead | 2013 | Released: July 3, 2013 |
| Whatever | 2014 | Released: May 16, 2014 |
| For Mixmag: The Cover Mix | 2014 | Released: October 31, 2014; Distributor: Mixmag; Formats: CD, digital |
| 0.001% | 2016 | Released: September 22, 2016; Companion to 99.9% |

=== Collaborative projects ===
List of The Celestics albums, with selected details
| Title | Year | Details |
|---|---|---|
| Massively Massive | 2011 | Released: December 15, 2011; Label: self-released; Format: Digital; Credited as Kaytradamus |
| Supreme Laziness | 2014 | Released: May 20, 2014; Label: HW&W; Format: Digital |

List of other collaborative projects, with selected details
| Title | Year | Details |
|---|---|---|
| Kayoz EP (with Munoz) | 2011 | Released: February 1, 2011; Credited as Kaytradamus |
| Mockay EP (with Mr. Mockwell) | 2012 | Released: March 17, 2012; Credited as Kaytradamus |
| The Good Fight EP (with Krystale) | 2012 | Released: July 3, 2012; Credited as Kaytradamus |
| Les Filles Du Roé (with Robert Nelson) | 2012 | Released: September 4, 2012; Credited as Kaytradamus |
| Ocean & Montana EP (with Buddy) | 2017 | Released: May 18, 2017; Label: RCA; Formats: 12", digital |
| Kaytraminé (with Aminé as Kaytraminé) | 2023 | Released: May 19, 2023; Label: CLNB, Venice; Formats: Digital |

== Extended plays ==
List of EPs, with selected details
| Title | Details | Certifications |
|---|---|---|
| Kaytra Todo | Released: February 25, 2013; Label: Jakarta, HW&W; Formats: digital | |
| Nothin' Like U / Chances | Released: November 30, 2018; Label: RCA; Formats: 12", digital download | ARIA: Gold |
| Intimidated | Released: November 19, 2021; Label: RCA; Formats: Digital download, streaming | |

== Singles ==
=== As lead artist ===
List of singles, with chart position, showing year released and album name
| Title | Year | Peak chart positions | Certifications | Album |
| Title | Year | US Dance | Certifications | Album |
|---|---|---|---|---|
| "Free Things in Life" | 2013 | — | | Bromance #10 |
| "At All" / "Hilarity Duff" | 2013 | — | | Non-album single |
| "Leave Me Alone" (featuring Shay Lia) | 2014 | — | | 99.9% |
| "Drive Me Crazy" (featuring Vic Mensa) | 2015 | — | | 99.9% |
| "Glowed Up" / "Lite Spots" (featuring Anderson .Paak) | 2016 | — | RIAA: Gold; RMNZ: Gold | 99.9% |
| "Together" (featuring AlunaGeorge and GoldLink) | 2016 | — | | 99.9% |
| "My Dope House" (with Freddie Gibbs) | 2016 | — | | Non-album single |
| "10%" (featuring Kali Uchis) | 2019 | — | RIAA: Gold; ARIA: Gold | Bubba |
| "What You Need" (featuring Charlotte Day Wilson) | 2019 | 27 | | Bubba |
| "Oh No" (featuring Estelle) | 2019 | — | | Bubba |
| "Freefall" (featuring Durand Bernarr) | 2019 | 29 | | Bubba |
| "2 the Music" (featuring Iman Omari) | 2019 | — | | Bubba |
| "Vex Oh" (featuring GoldLink, Eight9fly and Ari PenSmith) | 2019 | — | | Bubba |
| "The Worst in Me" (featuring Tinashe) | 2019 | 17 | RIAA: Gold | Bubba |
| "Need It" (featuring Masego) | 2019 | 23 | | Bubba |
| "Culture" (featuring Teedra Moses) | 2019 | — | | Bubba |
| "Dysfunctional" (featuring VanJess) | 2020 | — | | Non-album singles |
| "Look Easy" (featuring Lucky Daye) | 2020 | 21 | | Non-album singles |
| "The Recipe" (with Aluna and Rema) | 2020 | — | | Non-album singles |
| "Caution" | 2021 | — | | Non-album singles |
| "Twin Flame" (with Anderson .Paak) | 2022 | 21 | | Non-album singles |
| "4Eva" (as Kaytraminé with Aminé and Pharrell Williams) | 2023 | — | | Kaytraminé |
| "Rebuke" (as Kaytraminé with Aminé) | 2023 | — | | Kaytraminé |
| "Lover/Friend" (with Rochelle Jordan) | 2023 | 21 | | Timeless |
| "Drip Sweat" (featuring Channel Tres) | 2024 | 34 | | Timeless |
| "Space Invader" | 2025 | 11 | | Ain't No Damn Way! |

=== As featured artist ===
List of tracks as a featured artist
| Title | Year | Certifications | Album |
|---|---|---|---|
| "Ones" (Mr. Carmack featuring Kaytranada) | 2013 | | Ones (Promo) |
| "Down Low" (Cyber featuring Green Hypnotic & Kaytranada) | 2013 | | Down Low (Promo) |
| "Cherry Funk" (Pomo featuring Kaytranada) | 2013 | | The Other Day |
| "Girl" (The Internet featuring Kaytranada) | 2015 | RIAA: Platinum; BPI: Silver; RMNZ: Gold | Ego Death |
| "Lavender" (BadBadNotGood featuring Kaytranada) | 2016 | | IV |
| "Lust" (Kendrick Lamar) | 2017 | | Damn |
| "Telling the Truth" (Mary J. Blige featuring Kaytranada & BadBadNotGood) | 2017 | | Strength of a Woman |
| "Intro" (Nine Six Honcho feat. Kaytranada) | 2017 | | Crazy |
| "Domina" (Planet Giza featuring Kaytranada) | 2017 | | Détour: Zayad City |
| "Lavender [Nightfall Remix]" (Snoop Dogg featuring Kaytranada & BadBadNotGood) | 2017 | | Neva Left |
| "Heard This One Before" (Phonte featuring Kaytranada & Bosco) | 2019 | | Pacific Time EP |
| "Nike Shoe Box" (Lou Phelps with Kaytranada) | 2019 | | Extra Extra! EP |

== Other charted and certified songs ==
List of other charting tracks, with chart position, showing year released and album name
| Title | Year | Peak chart positions | | Certifications | Album |
| Title | Year | NZ Hot | US Dance | Certifications | Album |
|---|---|---|---|---|---|
| "You're the One" (featuring Syd) | 2016 | — | — | RIAA: Gold; BPI: Silver; RMNZ: Platinum | 99.9% |
| "Got It Good" (featuring Craig David) | 2016 | — | — | RMNZ: Gold | 99.9% |
| "Taste" (featuring VanJess) | 2019 | — | 24 | | Bubba |
| "Do It" | 2019 | — | 21 | | Bubba |
| "Puff Lah" | 2019 | — | 22 | | Bubba |
| "September 21" | 2019 | — | 43 | | Bubba |
| "Scared to Death" | 2019 | — | 31 | | Bubba |
| "Intimidated" (featuring H.E.R.) | 2021 | 13 | 9 | RIAA: Gold; ARIA: Gold; BPI: Gold | Intimidated |
| "Be Careful" (featuring Thundercat) | 2021 | — | 20 | RMNZ: Gold | Intimidated |
| "$payforhaiti" (featuring Mach-Hommy) | 2021 | — | 21 | | Intimidated |
| "Who He Iz" (as Kaytraminé) | 2023 | 23 | — | | Kaytraminé |
| "Letstalkaboutit" (as Kaytraminé featuring Freddie Gibbs) | 2023 | 29 | — | | Kaytraminé |
| "Master P" (as Kaytraminé featuring Big Sean) | 2023 | 33 | — | | Kaytraminé |
| "Sossaup" (as Kaytraminé featuring Amaarae) | 2023 | 22 | — | | Kaytraminé |
| "Pressure" | 2024 | — | 49 | | Timeless |
| "Spit It Out" (featuring Rochelle Jordan) | 2024 | — | 37 | | Timeless |
| "Call U Up" (featuring Lou Phelps) | 2024 | 38 | 43 | | Timeless |
| "Weird" (featuring Durand Bernarr) | 2024 | — | 46 | | Timeless |
| "Feel a Way" (featuring Don Toliver) | 2024 | 31 | 29 | | Timeless |
| "Do 2 Me" (featuring Anderson .Paak and Sir) | 2024 | — | 47 | | Timeless |
| "Witchy" (featuring Childish Gambino) | 2024 | 15 | 12 | | Timeless |
| "Snap My Finger" (featuring PinkPantheress) | 2024 | — | 37 | | Timeless |

== Other appearances ==
Standalone tracks on compilations

- "Street Twister" on Artbeat Montreal: Brassures Du Terroir (ABMTL, December 6, 2011)
- "109" and "Kevin" with High Klassified on Piu Piu Beat Tape Vol. 1 (Piu Piu, May 10, 2012)
- "Black Mozart" feat. Green Hypnotic & Cyber on SandwichGallery 2 (a-La, January 11, 2013) (as part of The Celestics)
- "118" on Distant Minds 3 (LOAFLAB, July 7, 2013)
- "195" on XL Chapter VI (XL Recordings, February 25, 2016)
- "Well I Bet Ya" on Gangster Music Vol. 1 (All City Records, 2019)

== Remixes ==
Official remix albums

- Lavendar [Nightfall Remix] (Innovative Leisure Records, June 9, 2017) (original artist: BADBADNOTGOOD)
- The ArtScience Remixes (Blue Note, April 21, 2018) (original artist: Robert Glasper)

Remix compilations

- Remixes Vol. 1 (January 1, 2012)
- Kaytranada RMX EP (September 4, 2013)

== Music videos ==
=== As lead artist ===
List of music videos as lead artist, with directors, showing year released
| Title | Year | Director(s) |
|---|---|---|
| "AT ALL" | 2013 | Martin C. Pariseau |
| "LITE SPOTS" | 2016 | Martin C. Pariseau |
| "GLOWED UP" (featuring Anderson .Paak) | 2016 | Bo Mirosseni |
| "YOU'RE THE ONE" (featuring SYD) | 2016 | Shomi Patwary |
| "PUFF LAH" | 2019 | Liam MacRae |
| "10%" (featuring Kali Uchis) | 2020 | |
| "Need It" (featuring Masego) | 2020 | |
| "The Worst in Me" (featuring Tinashe) | 2020 | |
| "Look Easy (The Short)" (featuring Lucky Daye) | 2020 | |
| "Twin Flame" (featuring Anderson .Paak) | 2022 | Anderson .Paak |
| "Drip Sweat" (featuring Channel Tres) | 2024 | |
| "Witchy" (featuring Childish Gambino) | 2024 | |
| "Snap My Finger" (featuring PinkPantheress) | 2024 | |
| "Seemingly" | 2024 | |
| "Call U Up" (featuring Lou Phelps) | 2024 | |
| "Pressure" | 2024 | |
| "Video" (featuring Ravyn Lenae) | 2024 | |
| "Spit It Out" (featuring Rochelle Jordan) | 2024 | |
| "Space Invader" | 2025 | Kaytranada & Daniel Yaro |

== See also ==
- Kaytranada production discography
