= Kaytranada production discography =

Louis Kevin Celestin is a producer better known as Kaytranada. This production discography lists the recorded performances, writing and production credits as Louis Kevin Celestin, as Kaytranada, or Kaytradamus.

Song names that are bold are singles, album names/releases are in italics. Please note, this list may be incomplete.

== 2010 ==
=== Costa Joe – Petit Pays (Promo) (unreleased) ===
- "Petit Pays" (produced as Kaytradamus)

=== Costa Joe & Louie Phelps – Y'a Probleme! (Promo) (unreleased) ===
- "Y'a Probleme!" (produced as Kaytradamus)

== 2011 ==
=== R.J. and Technique – Brain Suck (Promo) (unreleased) ===
- "Brain Suck" (produced as Kaytradamus)

== 2012 ==
=== Green Hypnotic – Inc.O.A.S.T.Nito (November 20) ===
- "Montreal (Fuck 'Em All)" {produced as Kaytradamus}

Robert Nelson

- "Dorothée" (August 27)

== 2013 ==
=== Cyber - "Down Low" ===
- "Down Low" (May 15)

=== Koriass – Rue Des Saules (November 12) ===
- "Long Time No See"

=== Nine Six Honcho – Intro ===
- "Intro"

=== Robert Nelson – "Des Hauts Et Des Bas" June 20) ===
- "Des Hauts Et Des Bas"

== 2014 ==
=== Alaclair Ensemble – Toute Est Impossible (July 1) ===
- "Fastlane"

=== GoldLink – "Sober Thoughts" (May 15) ===
- "Sober Thoughts" (April 1)

=== Mick Jenkins – "Rain" (September 18) ===
- "Rain"

=== Mobb Deep – The Infamous Mobb Deep (April 1) ===
- "My Block"

=== Reva DeVito – "Friday Night" (April 17) ===
- "Friday Night"

=== Shay Lia – 3 Months ===
- "3 Months" (September 16)

=== The Celestics – "Kill" / "Charles Barkley" ===
- "Kill" (June 3)
- "Charles Barkley" (October 21)

=== Vic Mensa – "Wimme Nah" (August 8) ===
- "Wimme Nah"

== 2015 ==
=== Aminé – Calling Brio (August 31) ===
- "Buckwild"
- "La Danse"
- "YeYe"

=== Freddie Gibbs – Shadow of a Doubt (November 20) ===
- "Insecurities" (feat. River Tiber) {produced with Frank Dukes & Speakerbomb}

Illa J – Illa J (October 2)

- "Strippers" {produced with Potatohead People}

Kali Uchis – Por Vida (February 4)

- "Rush" (May 5) {produced with BadBadNotGood}

Koriass – Petit Love EP (December 18)

- "Quinze Minutes"

Leon, The Synergist – Synergize (July 7)

- "Hotel Banger"

Lou Phelps (aka Louie P) – "Pree" (April 20)

- "Pree" (feat. Marvel Alexander)

Marvel Alexander – Don't Die Yet (January 23)

- "Don't Die Yet"
- "Illest Nigga"
- "Popcorn" (feat. Wiki) {produced with BadBadNotGood}

Mick Jenkins – Wave[s] EP (August 21)

- "Ps & Qs"
- "Your Love"
- "Head Ass"

Rejjie Snow – "Blakkst Skn" (September 23)

- "Blakkst Skn" (feat. Rae Morris) (December 7)

Rome Fortune – "Dance"

- "Dance" (November 24)

Talib Kweli – Fuck the Money (August 14)

- "Butterfly" (feat. Steffanie Christi'an)

The Internet –

- "Girl" (June 23)

Towkio – .Wav Theory (April 28)

- "Involved" (feat. Vic Mensa )
- "Reflection" (May 21)

Wasiu – "Physical" February 12)

- "Physical" (February 12)

Wiki – Lil' Me (December 7)

- "3 Stories" (June 8)

Zak Abel – One Hand on the Future (August 28)

- "Say Sumthin"

== 2016 ==
Anderson .Paak – Malibu (January 15)

- "Lite Weight" (feat. The Free Nationals United Fellowship Choir)

Azealia Banks – Slay-Z (March 24)

- "Along the Coast" (April 28)

BadBadNotGood – IV

- ""Lavender" (November 16) {produced with BadBadNotGood}

Chance The Rapper – Coloring Book (May 13)

- "All Night" (feat. Knox Fortune)

Craig David – Following My Intuition (September 30)

- "Sink or Swim" {produced with Tre Jean-Marie}

Exmiranda – "Pink Panther" (December 22)

- "Pink Panther"

GoldLink – Fall in Love (August 26)

- "Fall in Love" (feat. Ciscero) (November 22)

J.K. the Reaper – "Dressed 2 Kill" (September 8)

- "Dressed 2 Kill" (feat. Denzel Curry) (November 8)

Kali Uchis – "Only Girl" (April 11)

- "Only Girl" (feat. Steve Lacy & Vince Staples) (April 20)

Katy B – Honey

- "Honey"

KAYTRANANDA – 99.9%

- 01. "Track Uno"
- 02. "Bus Ride" (featuring Karriem Riggins and River Tiber) {produced with Karriem Riggins and River Tiber}
- 03. "Got It Good" (featuring Craig David)
- 04. "Together" (featuring AlunaGeorge and GoldLink)
- 05. "Drive Me Crazy" (featuring Vic Mensa)
- 06. "Weight Off" (featuring BadBadNotGood){produced with BadBadNotGood}
- 07. "One Too Many" (featuring Phonte)
- 08. "Despite the Weather"
- 09. "Glowed Up" (featuring Anderson .Paak)
- 10. "Breakdance Lesson N.1"
- 11. "You're the One" (featuring Syd)
- 12. "Vivid Dreams" (featuring River Tiber)
- 13. "Lite Spots"
- 14. "Leave Me Alone" (featuring Shay Lia)
- 15. "Bullets" (featuring Little Dragon)
- 16. "Nobody Beats the Kay"

Lou Phelps – Rent Is Due (Promo) (April 1)

- "Rent Is Due" (feat. Key! (produced with Planet Giza))

Mick Jenkins – The Healing Component (September 23)

- "1000 Xans" (feat. theMIND) {produced with THEMpeople}
- "Communicate" (feat. Ravyn Lenae ) {produced with THEMpeople}

– Countdown 2 Midnight (December 16)

- "Aurora Borealis" {produced with THEMpeople}

– "The Artful Dodger"

- "The Artful Dodger" {produced with THEMpeople}

Reva DeVito – The Move EP (September 13)

- "So Bad"
- "The Move"

River Tiber – Red Bull Sound Select

- "Gravity" {produced with River Tiber}
- "Illusions" (feat. Pusha T) {produced with River Tiber & Doc McKinney}

Rome Fortune – Jerome Raheem Fortune (February 26)

- "Dance" (November 24)

Sinéad Harnett – Sinéad Harnett EP (August 4)

- "Say What You Mean"

Wiki – "Crib Tax"

- "Crib Tax" (January 8)

== 2017 ==
Alicia Keys – "Sweet F'n Love" (January 12)

- "Sweet F'n Love"

Antwon – Sunnyvale Gardens (October 5)

- "What I Do" (July 22)

Buddy – Ocean & Montana EP (May 19)

- "A Lite"
- "Find Me" (May 19)
- "Guillotine"
- "Love or Something"
- "World of Wonders" (June 14)

Cassie – "Don't Play It Safe" (December 22)

- "Don't Play It Safe" (January 9)

Chewii – "PuNoni" (May 23)

- "PuNoni" (feat. Govales) (May 24)

Freddie Gibbs – You Only Live 2wice (March 31)

- "Alexys" {produced with BadBadNotGood}

GoldLink – At What Cost (March 24)

- "Hands on Your Knees" (feat. Kokayi)
- "Have You Seen That Girl"
- "Meditation" (feat. Jazmine Sullivan) (August 21)

Griff Cowan – Cocaine Testarossa (August 11)

- "Cocaine Testarossa"

Ivan Ave – "Also" (January 20)

- "Also" (January 20) {produced with Kiefer}

– Every Eye (November 10)

- "Steaming" (March 23) {produced with DāM-FunK}

Lou Phelps – 001: Experiments EP (April 12)

- "Average" (feat. KALLITECHNIS) (January 27)
- "I Got It" (feat. KALLITECHNIS)
- "Last Call" (feat. Bishop Nehru)
- "Massively Massive Part 2"
- "My Forte" (feat. CJ Flemings)
- "What Time Is It" (feat. Innanet James) (August 4)
- "What Time Is It" (Interlude) (August 4)
- "What We Been Thru"

Mary J. Blige - Strength of a Woman

- "Telling the Truth" {produced with BadBadNotGood}

Matt Martians – The Drum Chord Theory (January 27)

- "28" {produced with BadBadNotGood}

Nick Murphy (aka Chet Faker) – Missing Link EP (May 9)

- "Your Time"

Sinéad Harnett – Chapter One (June 1)

- "Heal You"

Shay Lia – "What's Your Problem" (June 26)

- "What's Your Problem" (November 2)

– "Losing Her" (March 24)

- "Losing Her" (March 27)

Snoop Dogg – Neva Left

- "Lavender (Nightfall Remix)" (March 12)

Sunni Colón – "Little Things" (August 10)

- "Little Things"

Talib Kweli – Radio Silence (November 17)

- "Traveling Light" (feat. Anderson .Paak) (November 17)

Wasiu – MTLIENS 2 (October 27)

- "Tabula Rasa"

=== Wiki - No Mountains in Manhattan ===
- "Baby Girl"

Yoshua – Tulou (July 7)

- "Weight Off" (feat. Baby-D) {produced with BadBadNotGood}

== 2018 ==
Bishop Nehru – Elevators: Act I & II (March 16)

- "Driftin'"
- "Get Away"
- "No Idea"
- "The Game of Life"
- "Up Up & Away" (feat. Lion Babe )

Cadence Weapon – Cadence Weapon (January 19)

- "My Crew (Woooo)"

Costa Joe – "Guerrier" (March 31)

- "Guerrier"

Craig David – The Time Is Now (January 26)

- "Live in The Moment" (feat. GoldLink)

Diggy – "Goin" (October 27)

- "Goin'"

Govales – G Spot (February 23)

- "All In"
- "Out of This World"

Lauren Faith – "Just a Little" (August 16)

- "Just a Little"

Lou Phelps – 002/Love Me (September 21)

- "Come Inside" (feat. Jazz Cartier) (March 29)
- "Come Inside" (hidden interlude)
- "Miss Phatty" (September 10) {produced with BadBadNotGood}
- "Higher" {produced with Karriem Riggins}
- "Go!"
- "Want To (For the Youth)" (May 23)

Mick Jenkins – Pieces of a Man (October 26)

- "Padded Locks" (feat. Ghostface Killah) (October 11)
- "Understood" (October 21) {produced with Alexander Sowinski of BadBadNotGood}

– "What Am I to Do"

- "What Am I to Do"

Rejjie Snow – Dear Annie (February 16)

- "Egyptian Luvr" (feat. Aminé & Dana Williams)

=== Shad - A Short Story About a War ===
- "The Fool Part 3 (Frame of Mind)"

Shay Lia – "Cherish"/"Funky Thing"

- "Cherish" (February 2)
- "Funky Thang" (August 11)
- "Vacation (Interlude)"

VanJess – Silk Canvas (July 27)

- 09. "Another Lover"

== 2019 ==
=== KAYTRANADA – Bubba ===
- 01. "Do It"
- 02. "2 the Music" (featuring Iman Omari)
- 03. "Go DJ" (featuring SiR)
- 04. "Gray Area" (featuring Mick Jenkins)
- 05. "Puff Lah"
- 06. "10%" (featuring Kali Uchis)
- 07. "Need It" (featuring Masego)
- 08. "Taste" (featuring VanJess)
- 09. "Oh No" (featuring Estelle)
- 10. "What You Need" (featuring Charlotte Day Wilson)
- 11. "Vex Oh" (featuring GoldLink, Eight9fly and Ari PenSmith)
- 12. "Scared to Death"
- 13. "Freefall" (featuring Durand Bernarr)
- 14. "Culture" (featuring Teedra Moses)
- 15. "The Worst in Me" (featuring Tinashe)
- 16. "September 21"
- 17. "Midsection" (featuring Pharrell Williams)

=== KAYTRANADA – "Dysfunctional" ===
- "DYSFUNCTIONAL" (featuring VanJess)

=== Lauren Faith – Cosmic EP (July 25) ===
- "Jheeze (Cosmic Love)"

=== Maybe Watson - Enter the Dance ===
- "Pablo Mezza"

=== Mono/Poly – Monotomic (September 13) ===
- "Dive Out"

=== Quelle Chris – Gangster Music Vol. 1. (March 8) ===
- "Brain of the Ape"

=== Phonte - Pacific Love ===
- "Heard This One Before" (featuring Bosco)

=== Sesame Street – "Give It, Live It, Respect" (April 18) ===
- "Give It, Live It, Respect" (featuring Common) {produced with BadBadNotGood}

=== Shay Lia – Dangerous (May 24) ===
- "Blue" {produced with BadBadNotGood}
- "Want You" (feat. Kojey Radical )

== 2020 ==
=== Aluna – Renaissance (August 28) ===
- "The Recipe" (with Kaytranada and Rema)

=== KAYTRANADA – "Look Easy" ===
- "Look Easy" (feat. Lucky Daye)

=== Lou Phelps – EXTRA EXTRA! EP ===
- "NIKE SHOE BOX"

=== Maeta – "Teen Scene" ===
- "Teen Scene" (feat. Buddy)

=== Mick Jenkins – "Frontstreet" ===
- "Frontstreet (Freestyle)"

== 2021 ==
=== Tinashe – 333 ===
- "Unconditional"

=== Muzi - Interblaktic ===
- I Know It

== 2022 ==
=== Ravyn Lenae - Hypnos ===
- "Xtasy"

=== Kelela - Raven ===
- "On The Run"

=== PinkPantheress - Take Me Home ===
- "Do you miss me?"

=== JID - The Forever Story ===
- "Can't Punk Me" (feat. EARTHGANG)

=== D Smoke - War & Wonders ===
- "Mind My Business"

=== Freddie Gibbs - $oul $old $eperately ===
- "Zipper Bagz"

=== IDK - Simple ===
- "Dog Food"

== 2023 ==
=== AMAKA - Oasis ===
- "Cruisin'"
- "Unfamiliar'"

=== Don Toliver - Lovesick ===
- "Honeymoon"

=== Victoria Monét – Jaguar II ===
- "Alright"

=== Mariah the Scientist - To Be Eaten Alive ===
- "Out of Luck'"

=== Joyce Wrice - Motive ===
- "Iced Tea"
- ”Lookin for Ya”
- ”Pace Yourself”

=== Myth Syzer - Poison ===
- "Sunday Love Fever"

== 2024 ==
=== ¥$ (Kanye West and Ty Dolla Sign) – Vultures 1 ===
- 03. "Paid" {produced with many others}

=== KAYTRANADA – Timeless ===
- 01. "Pressure"
- 02. "Spit It Out" (featuring Rochelle Jordan)
- 03. "Call U Up" (featuring Lou Phelps)
- 04. "Weird" (featuring Durand Bernarr)
- 05. "Dance Dance Dance Dance"
- 06. "Feel A Way" (featuring Don Toliver)
- 07. "Still" (featuring Charlotte Day Wilson)
- 08. "Video" (featuring Ravyn Lenae)
- 09. "Seemingly"
- 10. "Drip Sweat" (featuring Channel Tres)
- 11. "Hold On" (featuring Dawn Richard)
- 12. "Please Babe"
- 13. "Stepped On"
- 14. "More Than a Little Bit" (featuring Tinashe)
- 15. "Do 2 Me" (featuring Anderson .Paak and Sir)
- 16. "Witchy" (featuring Childish Gambino)
- 17. "Lover/Friend" (featuring Rochelle Jordan)
- 18. "Wasted Words" (featuring Thundercat)
- 19. "Snap My Finger" (featuring PinkPantheress)
- 20. "Stuntin" (featuring Channel Tres)
- 21. "Out of Luck" (featuring Mariah the Scientist)

=== Maeta ===
- "DJ Got Me"
- "Turn Me On"

=== Mach-Hommy - #RICHAXXHAITAN ===
- "#RICHAXXHAITAN" (feat. 03 Greedo)

=== JasonMartin & DJ Quik – Chupacabra ===
- 15. "Ayo"

== 2025 ==
=== KAYTRANADA – Ain't No Damn Way! ===
- 01. "Space Invader"
- 02. "Championship"
- 03. "Home"
- 04. "Target Joint"
- 05. "Things"
- 06. "backstABS"
- 07. "Good Luck"
- 08. "Shine Your Light for We"
- 09. "Goodbye Bitch!"
- 10. "Don't Worry Babe / I Got U Babe"
- 11. "Blax"
- 12. "Do It (Again!)" (featuring TLC)

=== IDK feat. DMX ===
- "START 2 FiNiSH - S.T.F."

=== Rochelle Jordan ===
- "The Boy"

=== Teyana Taylor feat. KAYTRANADA ===
- "Open Invite" (feat. KAYTRANADA)

=== PartyOf2 ===
- "FEEL LOVE"

== Remixes ==
Title	Year	Artist	Album	Release date
Russian Roulette (Kaytradamus Remix)	2009	Rihanna	Russian Roulette (Promo) (unreleased)	2009
Find Your Love (Kaytradamus Remix) (Extended Version)	2010	Drake	Find Your Love (Promo) (unreleased)	2010
Find Your Love (Kay's Hippydee-Hop Edit)	2010	Drake	Find Your Love (Promo) (unreleased)	2010
Signatune (Kaytradamus Remix)	2010	DJ Mehdi	Kaytra Da Mouse	April 2010
Window Seat (Kaytradamus Remix)	2010	Erykah Badu	Kaytra Da Mouse	April 2010
Stop! (Kaytradamus Remix)	2010	J Dilla	Stop! (Promo) (unreleased)	2010
Control (Kaytradamus Remix)	2010	Janet Jackson	Control (Kaytradamus Remix)	2010
DVNO (Kaytradamus Remix)	2010	Justice	Kaytra Da Mouse	April 2010
Teenage Dream (Kaytradamus Remix)	2010	Katy Perry	Teenage Dream (Promo) (unreleased)	2010
Nightcall (Kaytradamus Remix)	2010	Kavinsky	Nightcall (Promo) (unreleased)	May 8, 2010
XXXO (Kaytradamus Remix)	2010	M.I.A.	XXXO (Promo) (unreleased)	2010
Somebody to Love Me (feat. Boy George & Andrew Wyatt) (Kaytradamus Remix)	2010	Mark Ronson & The Business Intl.	Somebody to Love Me (Promo) (unreleased)	2010
Sick Muse (Kaytradamus Remix)	2010	Metric	Sick Muse (Promo) (unreleased)	2010
Psych Swing (Kaytradamus Remix)	2010	Munoz	Psych Swing (Promo) (unreleased)	2010
Drugs (Kaytradamus Remix)	2010	Ratatat	Drugs (Promo) (unreleased)	2010
Rude Boy (Kaytradamus Remix)	2010	Rihanna	Rude Boy (Promo) (unreleased)	2010
The Continuation (Kaytradamus Remix)	2010	Rozeaudio	The Continuation (Promo) (unreleased)	2010
Music Sounds Better With You (Kaytradamus Remix)	2010	Stardust	Music Sounds Better With You (Promo) (unreleased)	2010
What You Know (Kaytradamus Remix)	2010	Two Door Cinema Club	What You Know (Promo) (unreleased)	June 22, 2010
Skates III (Kaytradamus Remix)	2011	Action Movie Hero Boy	The Forest	August 1, 2011
The American Dream (Kaytralaboom Remix)	2011	Children of the Corn	The American Dream (Promo) (unreleased)	November 24, 2011
Beautiful People (Kaytradamus Remix)	2011	Chris Brown	Beautiful People (Promo) (unreleased)	April 15, 2011
Game Over (feat. Jay Dee & Phat Kat (Kaytradamus Remix)	2011	Dabrye	Game Over (Promo) (unreleased)	May 5, 2011
Caught Up (Kaytradamus Remix feat. Louie P Celestic)	2011	Krystale	Caught Up (Promo) (unreleased)	November 20, 2011
Go Around (Kaytradamus Remix)	2011	Nenna Yvonne	Go Around (Promo) (unreleased)	June 14, 2011
Get the Bassline (Kaytradamus Remix)	2011	Neus	Get the Bassline	May 1, 2011
S&M (Kaytradamus 1977 Remix)	2011	Rihanna	S&M (Promo) (unreleased)	2011
Water Games (Kaytradamus Remix)	2011	SebastiAn	Water Games (Promo) (unreleased)	June 18, 2011
Rain (Kaytradamus Remix)	2011	SWV	Rain (Promo) (unreleased)	May 15, 2011
Diggin' On You (Kaytradamus Remix)	2011	TLC	Diggin' On You (Promo) (unreleased)	2011
Creep (Kaytradamus Remix)	2011	TLC	Creep (Promo) (unreleased)	December 21, 2011
Rumble In The Jungle (feat. Busta Rhymes, John Forté & Fugees) (Kaytradamus Remix)	2012	A Tribe Called Quest	Rumble In The Jungle (Promo) (unreleased)	April 6, 2012
Party (feat. André 3000) (Kaytradamus Remix)	2012	Beyoncé	Party (Promo) (unreleased)	June 28, 2012
Southside Anthem (Kaytranada Remix)	2012	Big Dope P	Southside Anthem (Promo) (unreleased)	2012
American Dream (feat. McGruff, Ma$e, Cam'Ron & Bloodshed) (Kaytradamus Remix)	2012	Big L	Remixes Vol. 1	January 1, 2012
Full Moon (Kaytradamus Remix)	2012	Brandy	Full Moon (Promo) (unreleased)	June 15, 2012
Wamp Wamp (What It Do) (feat. Slim Thug) (Kaytradamus Remix)	2012	Clipse	Remixes Vol. 1	January 1, 2012
The Corner (feat. Kanye West & The Last Poets) (Kaytradamus Remix)	2012	Common	The Corner (Promo) (unreleased)	2012
Lie4 (Kaytranada Remix)	2012	Danny Brown	Kaytranada Remix (EP)	October 1, 2012
Lie4 (Kaytranada Remix) (Instrumental)	2012	Danny Brown	Kaytranada Remix (EP)	October 1, 2012
Doin' It Wrong (Kaytradamus Remix)	2012	Dres	Remixes Vol. 1	January 1, 2012
Love of My Life (Kaytranada Remix)	2012	Erykah Badu	Kaytranada Remix (EP)	April 24, 2012
SupaStar (feat. Common) (Kaytradamus Remix)	2012	Floetry	Remixes Vol. 1	January 1, 2012
Mighty Healthy (Kaytradamus Remix)	2012	Ghostface Killah	Remixes Vol. 1	January 1, 2012
R.E.C. Room (Kaytradamus Remix)	2012	Inspectah Deck	Remixes Vol. 1	January 1, 2012
My Thang (Kaytradamus Remix)	2012	James Brown	Remixes Vol. 1	January 1, 2012
If (Kaytranada Remix) (Alternate)	2012	Janet Jackson	If (Promo) (unreleased)	2012
If (Kaytranada Remix) (Alternate II)	2012	Janet Jackson	If (Promo) (unreleased)	2012
That's The Way Love Goes (Kaytra's Way)	2012	Janet Jackson	That's The Way Love Goes (Promo) (unreleased)	May 3, 2012
Dream Brother (Kaytranada Remix)	2012	Jeff Buckley	Dream Brother (Promo) (unreleased)	September 12, 2012
Cry Me A River (Kaytranada Remix)	2012	Justin Timberlake	Cry Me A River (Promo) (unreleased)	July 7, 2012
Crucial (Kaytranada Remix)	2012	K-Os	Crucial (Promo)	November 12, 2012
Mort De Manu (Garde Ta Job) (Kaytradamus Remix)	2012	Koriass	Mort De Manu (Garde Ta Job) (Promo) (unreleased)	2012
Caught Up (feat. Louie P Celestic) (Alternate Remix)	2012	Koriass	Caught Up (Promo) (unreleased)	2012
Bad Girls (Kaytradamus Remix)	2012	M.I.A.	Bad Girls (Promo) (unreleased)	April 16, 2012
Loverboy (Kaytradamus Remix)	2012	Maybe Watson	Maybe Watson Remix	September 17, 2012
P.S. (Kaytradamus Remix)	2012	Maybe Watson	Maybe Watson Remix	September 17, 2012
P.S. (Kaytradamus Remix) (Instrumental)	2012	Maybe Watson	Maybe Watson Remix	September 17, 2012
Honey Beef (Kaytranada's Remix)	2012	Mos Def, Lee Fields & The Expressions	Remixes Vol. 1	January 3, 2012
Sock It 2 Me (Kaytranada Edition)	2012	Missy Elliott	Sock It 2 Me (Promo)	December 14, 2012
Lady (Hear Me Tonight) (Kaytranada Remix)	2012	Modjo	Lady (Hear Me Tonight) (Promo)	November 24, 2012
Say It Right (feat. Timbaland) (Kaytradamus Remix)	2012	Nelly Furtado	Say It Right (Promo) (unreleased)	August 8, 2012
Steepless (feat. Cornelia) (Kaytradamus Remix)	2012	Portico Quartet	Steepless (Promo)	January 8, 2012
Move Love (feat. KING) (Kaytradamus Remix)	2012	Robert Glasper Experiment	Move Love (Promo)	January 24, 2012
Climax (Kaytradamus Remix)	2012	Usher	Climax (Promo)	May 9, 2012
Fire N' Rain (Kaytranada Edition)	2013	Acid Washed	Fire N' Rain (Promo)	April 10, 2013
Mariah (Kaytranada Edition)	2013	American Royalty	Mariah (Promo)	July 1, 2013
Mariah (Kaytranada Edition) (Instrumental)	2013	American Royalty	Mariah (Promo)	July 1, 2013
Why Don't We Fall In Love (Kaytranada Remix)	2013	Amerie	Kaytranada Remix (EP)	September 4, 2013
Why Don't We Fall In Love (Kaytranada Edition) (Alternate)	2013	Amerie	Why Don't We Fall In Love (Promo)	April 22, 2013
ATM Jam (feat. Pharrell) (Kaytranada Edition)	2013	Azealia Banks	ATM Jam (Promo)	September 7, 2013
ATM Jam (feat. Pharrell) (Kaytranada Edition) (Alternate)	2013	Azealia Banks	ATM Jam (Promo)	September 7, 2013
Waiting Game (Kaytranada Edition)	2013	Banks	Waiting Game (Promo)	November 7, 2013
Typically Her (Kaytranada Edition)	2013	Beverlay	Typically Her (Promo)	February 27, 2013
Work It Out (feat. Pharrell) (Kaytranada Remix)	2013	Beyoncé	Kaytranada Remix (EP)	September 4, 2013
Treasure (Kaytranada Edit)	2013	Bruno Mars	Treasure (Promo)	August 29, 2013
What's It Gonna Be (feat. Janet Jackson) (Kaytranada Edition)	2013	Busta Rhymes	What's It Gonna Be (Promo)	June 25, 2013
I Want You (feat. Will.I.Am) (Kaytranada Remix)	2013	Common	I Want You (Promo)	October 29, 2013
Perfect Form (feat. Shy Girls) (Kaytranada Edition)	2013	Cyril Hahn	Perfect Form (Promo)	August 18, 2013
January (feat. Jamie Woon) (Kaytranada Edition)	2013	Disclosure	Settle: The Remixes	December 17, 2013
Holdin On (Kaytranada Edit)	2013	Flume	Holdin On (Promo)	June 5, 2013
If (Kaytranada Remix)	2013	Janet Jackson	Kaytranada Remix (EP)	September 4, 2013
Blue Magic (feat. Pharrell) (Kaytranada Remix)	2013	Jay-Z	Instrumental Hip Hop Is Dead	July 3, 2013
Golden (Kaytranada's Life Extended Living Edition)	2013	Jill Scott	Golden (Promo)	March 20, 2013
Love & Pain (Kaytranada Remix)	2013	JMSN	Love & Pain (Remix EP)	January 1, 2013
On & On (feat. George Maple) (Kaytranada Remix)	2013	Snakehips	On & On (Promo)	May 27, 2013
Be Your Girl (Kaytranada Remix)	2013	Teedra Moses	Kaytranada Remix (EP)	September 4, 2013
Creep (feat. Dallas Austin) (Kaytranada's Creepier Edition)	2013	TLC	Creep (Promo)	January 11, 2013
Time Is Now (Kaytranada Remix)	2013	Youthkills	Time Is Now (Promo) (unreleased)	2013
Kaleidoscope Love (Kaytranada Edition)	2014	AlunaGeorge	Body Music (Remixed)	June 16, 2014
Kaleidoscope (Kaytranada's Flip)	2014	BadBadNotGood	Kaleidoscope (Promo)	October 15, 2014
Talk Is Cheap (Kaytranada Flip)	2014	Chet Faker	Talk Is Cheap (Promo)	June 13, 2014
Body Party (Kaytranda's Never Going to Release This Shieet)	2014	Ciara	Body Party (Promo)	May 16, 2014
Come Get It (Where U At) (feat. eLZhi) (Kaytranada Remix)	2014	J Dilla	Come Get It (Where U At) (Promo)	May 14, 2014
It's Love (Kaytranada Remix)	2014	Jill Scott	It's Love (Promo)	May 14, 2014
I'm Really Hot (Kaytranada Remix)	2014	Missy Elliott	I'm Really Hot (Promo)	May 15, 2014
Wrote A Song About You (Kaytranada Edition)	2014	MNEK	Wrote A Song About You (Remixes)	April 21, 2014
Happy (Kaytranada Edition)	2014	Pharrell Williams	Happy (Promo)	May 12, 2014
About The Money (feat. Young Thug) (Kaytranada Remix)	2014	T.I.	About The Money (Promo)	December 9, 2014
Feel of Love (feat. Jacques Lu Cont & Jamie Lidell) (Kaytranada Edition)	2014	Tensnake	Feel of Love (Promo)	September 2, 2014
Silent Treatment (Kaytranada Edit)	2014	The Roots	Silent Treatment (Promo)	May 14, 2014
Oh My God (feat. Busta Rhymes) (Kaytranada Edit For the Clubs)	2015	A Tribe Called Quest	Oh My God (Promo)	September 29, 2015
Nothing Like This (Kaytranada Flip)	2015	J Dilla	Nothing Like This (Promo)	June 18, 2015
Don't Mess With My Mans (Kaytranada Edit)	2015	Lucy Pearl	Don't Mess With My Mans (Promo)	September 29, 2015
I Can Love You (feat. Lil' Kim) (Kaytranada Flip)	2015	Mary J. Blige	I Can Love You (Promo)	December 19, 2015
Hey Love (Kaytranada Remix)	2015	Quadron	Hey Love (Promo) (unreleased)	2015
The Light (feat. Denai Moore) (Kaytranada Remix)	2015	SBTRKT	The Light (Promo)	March 14, 2015
The Right Time (Kaytranada Remix)	2015	Tuxedo	Tuxedo Remixes	October 2, 2015
The Right Time (Kaytranada Remix) (Instrumental)	2015	Tuxedo	Tuxedo Remixes	October 2, 2015
Down On My Luck (Kaytranada Edition)	2015	Vic Mensa	Down On My Luck (Promo) (unreleased)	2015
Girlfriend (Kaytranada Remix)	2016	Alicia Keys	0.001%	September 22, 2016
Planet Rock (Kaytranada Remix)	2016	Afrika Bambaataa & The Soulsonic Force	Planet Rock (Remixes)	August 17, 2016
I Want You (Kaytranada Remix)	2016	Erykah Badu	I Want You (Promo)	May 9, 2016
Sharpness (Kaytranada Edit)	2016	Jamie Woon	Sharpness (Promo)	February 22, 2016
Alright (Kaytranada Flip)	2016	Janet Jackson	Alright (Promo)	March 9, 2016
Alright (Kaytranada Flip) (Alternate)	2016	Janet Jackson	Alright (Promo)	March 9, 2016
Alright (Kaytranada Flip) (Instrumental)	2016	Janet Jackson	Alright (Promo)	March 9, 2016
No Sleeep (Kaytranada Remix)	2016	Janet Jackson	0.001%	September 22, 2016
Kiss It Better (Kaytranada Edition)	2016	Rihanna	Dance Remix (EP)	June 1, 2016
Cranes In The Sky (Kaytranada Edit)	2016	Solange	Cranes In The Sky (Promo)	October 11, 2016
Diggin' On You (Kaytranada Remix) \ Flippin on You	2016	TLC	Diggin' On You (Promo)	January 5, 2016
U Don't Have To Call (Kaytranada Remix)	2016	Usher	0.001%	September 22, 2016
Strobelite (feat. Peven Everett) (Kaytranada Remix)	2017	Gorillaz	Strobelite (Promo)	August 18, 2017
House Party (Kaytranada Edit) (Drum breaks by BadBadNotGood)	2017	Latrelle	House Party (Promo)	January 10, 2017
Get to Know Ya (Kaytranada Flip)	2017	Nao	For All We Know: The Remixes	February 12, 2017
Midnight (Kaytranada Edit) \ The Night is On My Mind	2018	A Tribe Called Quest	Midnight (Promo)	August 15, 2018
Bubblin' (feat. Busta Rhymes) (Kaytranada Remix)	2018	Anderson .Paak	Bubblin' (Promo)	July 25, 2018
Waitin' (Kaytranada's 115 BPM Edit) (Single) (September 26)	2018	Kelela	Take Me A_Part (The Remixes)	October 5, 2018
Day to Day (feat. Casey Benjamin) (Kaytranada Remix)	2018	Robert Glasper Experiment	The ArtScience Remixes	April 13, 2018
Find You (feat. Iman Omari) (Kaytranada Remix)	2018	Robert Glasper Experiment	The ArtScience Remixes	April 13, 2018
No One Like You (feat. Alex Isley) (Kaytranada Remix)	2018	Robert Glasper Experiment	The ArtScience Remixes	April 13, 2018
Thinkin' 'Bout You (feat. Talib Kweli) (Kaytranada Remix)	2018	Robert Glasper Experiment	The ArtScience Remixes	April 13, 2018
Written In Stone (feat. Chanel Martin) (Kaytranada Remix)	2018	Robert Glasper Experiment	The ArtScience Remixes	April 13, 2018
Kiss of Life (Kaytranada Edit)	2018	Sade	Kiss of Life (Promo)	August 15, 2018
Where Were You In the Morning (Kaytranada Remix)	2018	Shawn Mendes	The Album (Remixes)	December 21, 2018
Roll (Burbank Funk) (Kaytranada Remix)	2018	The Internet	Roll (Burbank Funk) (Promo)	May 11, 2018
Rock the Boat (Kaytranada Edition)	2020	Aaliyah	Rock the Boat (Promo) (unreleased)	August 11, 2020
Bravebird (Kaytranada Edit)	2020	Amel Larrieux	Bravebird (Promo) (unreleased)	May 5, 2020
Don't Start Now (Kaytranada Edit)	2020	Dua Lipa		November 2020
Your Teeth In My Neck (Kaytranada Remix)	2020	Kali Uchis	Your Teeth In My Neck (Promo) (unreleased)	May 5, 2020
Wild Side (featuring Kaytranada) (Kaytranada Remix)	2021	Normani	Non-album remix	November 15, 2021
The Don & the Boss (Kaytranada Remix)	2021	Busta Rhymes		January 2022
Out of Time (KAYTRANADA Remix / Audio)	2022	The Weeknd	Non-album remix	April 2022
All Along (Kaytranada Remix)	2022	Rochelle Jordan		Sep 2022
Assumptions (Kaytranada Edit)	2023	Sam Gellaitry	Non-album remix	March 10, 2023
Young Rich & In Love (Kaytranada Remix)	2024	Kali Uchis	Orquíedas Parte 2	August 9, 2024
Don't Forget About Us (KAYTRANADA Remix)	2025	Mariah Carey	Non-album remix	
Girl Like Me	2025	PinkPantheress	Fancy Some More?	October 10, 2025

== Unofficial tracks ==
2009 (as Kaytradamus)

- "Getdownism"
- "Me, You and What?"
- "Minuit / Midi"

2010 (as Kaytradamus)

- "Aftershock/Jesus"
- "Anyone?"
- "Beggers"
- "Chipmonkey"
- "El Tricky"
- "Evacuate!" (Instrumental)
- "Fakin The Funk (Le Fin)"
- "Fell In Love"
- "God Put A Smile On My Face" (cover)
- "Good Music" (Instrumental)
- "Kaytra Nada's Theme"
- "Khayzumah Shabazz (Episode Uno – Born In These Streets)"
- "Let The Bass Slaps You"
- "Magnificent"
- "Paranoia"
- "Personal"
- "Startin' To Give Up"
- "The Coolest Remix"

2011 (as Kaytradamus)

- "A Jamaican BudWISEer/Too Wise"
- "Aidez Un Négrito"
- "Being Sexy"
- "Breakdance avec Kay"
- "Chocolate Tasty Milkshake"
- "Deep Dish"
- "Deux Cent"
- "El Bagay"
- "Hot Hoe"
- "I Know You"
- "Kay's Chinese Cabbage"
- "Love Took Us"
- "Mayer Hawthorne"
- "No Dancers Pt. 2 (Summer's Edition)"
- "Oh My Lawds"
- "Ooh Nah Yeah"
- "Petit Pays"
- "Rain In My Eyes"
- "Rocket Love"
- "Shook It"
- "TaDaTa"
- "The Future"
- "Told Too Many Times"

2012 (as Kaytradamus)

- "Evacuate" (feat. Miss Wonder)
- "FeelinQuiteSecsii"
- "New Seizures"
- "Regrets"
- "Summer Sadness"
- "Yeahman (Imasay)"
- "Down4U" (with Sango)
- "Voices from Heaven" (with Sango)
- "OriKay" (with Orijanus)

2013

- "Aloneness" (feat. Shay Lia)
- "Old Beat"
- "Seeu Enni Way"
- "Last Chance to Dance" (with Shash'u)
- "C'mon" (Feat. Kaytranada) (by Myth Syzer)
- "Black Mozart" (Instrumental) (The Celestics track)

2014

- "Lovelock" (feat. Shay Lia)
- "Victoria Bridge"
- "Widescreen" (feat. Kaytranada) (by Myth Syzer)

2015

- "81"
- "A Loser's Celebration"
- "Bow Bow" / "Feds Taking Pics"
- "Come Clean" (Hilary Duff Cover)
- "Ending Beat of the Mariah Remix"
- "Go Ahead"
- "Haitian Cook Out"
- "I've Got Your"
- "Kokaine"
- "Sub Bass"
- "Synthed"
- "Whateva U Want"

2016

- "C.O.D. Flip"
- "Nobody Beats the Kay"

2017

- "Chaos"
- "Windy:

2018

- "Chicago" (feat. Common)
- "Do We Have A Problem?" (Demo)

2020

- "Freefall" (Alternate) (feat. Durand Bernarr)
- "Hottest Shit"
- "KAYTRA2017 11 13 – Home"
- "KAYTRA2019 02 12"
- "KAYTRA2020 02 14 – BBNG"
- "KAYTRA2020 02 23 – Drugstore"
- "KAYTRA2020 04 16 I Don"t
- "Let Me Love You"
- "Wanna Be Your Lover"

Unconfirmed tracks

2007 (as Kaytradamus)

- "A Song For Liz"
- "Declivity"
- "Degradation"
- "Division"
- "Drop"
- "Harvest"
- "Rod Boogie"
- "She Thinks Soap's Sexy"
- "Surrender"
- "The Repercussion"
- "Twilight"

2008 (as Kaytradamus)

- "Afterlife"
- "Downfall"
- "Fruitage"
- "Goody Two Thoughts"
- "I Smile In Your Arms"
- "Jump"
- "Rhymes"
- "Smile"
- "Stairway To The Heart"
- "Third Stage"
- "Yearning For Full Thoughts"
- "You Think I Ain't Worth A Rod"

2009 (as Kaytradamus)

- "Pointy Blues"
- "Though Though Though"

2012 (as Kaytradamus)

- "Oh Snap
- "Sadness 1.0
- "Sweet Tooth" (Alternate) (with Krystale)
- "Robert Dit" (Instrumental) (with Robert Nelson)

2013

- "Around The World"
- "Drumline"
- "Eight Records"
- "Piano"
- "Piano Part II"
- "Zoe"

2014

- "Leave Me Alone" (Alternate) (feat. Shay Lia)
- "Lovecrimes"
- "Supreme"
- "Tacky"
- "The Black Sheep"
- "Worth It"
- "Charles Barkley" (Instrumental) (The Celestics track)

2015

- "I've Got You"
- "Pumped Up Kicks" (Foster the People cover)
- "Streams of Thought"

2016

- "Bus Bacc Home (Interlude)" (Instrumental)
- "Happy Conversations"
- "Lurking Around"
- "Twisted"

2017

- "Breezy"
- "Chain Reaction"
- "Everlong"
- "Hey Hey"
- "Vaporized Women"
- "Come Inside" (Alternate) (Lou Phelps track)

2018

- "A Song About Eskimos"
- "Forkplay"
- "Obsessed"
- "Vibrating Anxiety"

2019

- "Who Is It"
