= Lavender (BadBadNotGood song) =

Single by BadBadNotGood

from the album IV
- Released: July 8, 2016
- Genre: Nu jazz; instrumental hip hop; electronic
- Length: 3:21
- Label: Innovative Leisure
- Songwriters: BadBadNotGood; Kaytranada

BadBadNotGood singles chronology
"Confessions Pt. II" (2016)	"Lavender" (2016)	"In Your Eyes" (2016)

"Lavender" is a song released by Canadian jazz instrumental hip hop band BadBadNotGood (BBNG) as part of their 2016 album IV. The song has been adapted into two music videos. The official video was released by BBNG in November 2016. The American rapper Snoop Dogg added lyrics to the song and released the "Nightfall Remix" version in 2017. The music video to this version caused some controversy because of a scene depicting a mock assassination of U.S. President Donald Trump.

== Background and release ==
BBNG made the original version of the track with Kaytranada in their home studio in Toronto. In an email to The Fader, BBNG described the process of making the song. "Kay started the idea as a beat with our drum breaks and some synth melodies. Then we recut the drums and synth to formulate a song with more sections." In an interview with PopMatters in August 2016, Chester Hansen of BBNG said the band liked Kay's drum breaks and synth ideas and that the band "thought it would sound cool in context with the Ghost stuff we were working on so we took that and reworked it and then next time Kay was in town we worked on it again. It took about three or four different stages, and it was really this winter [when we completed it]."

The song was initially released on the album IV July 8, 2016. BBNG performed a rendition of "Lavender" on the Australian radio station Triple J during a Like a Version segment December 9, 2016.

== Reception ==
Michelle Geslani, writing in Consequence of Sound, described the song as "a true hybrid of both BadBadNotGood and Kaytranada, highlighted by woozy, jazzy bits and synths that tend to growl and glow." Jamieson Cox of The Verge praised Kaytranada's performance in the song writing. "It's tough to discern Kay's presence on this one, and that's a compliment — he seamlessly slots into the band's spacey, roiling jazz-funk."

== Official music video ==
BBNG released their official music video for "Lavender" via YouTube November 16, 2016. The video was directed by Fantavious Fritz and features BBNG band members playing a realistic game of Dungeons & Dragons. The video begins with the BBNG band members looking at an advertisement on a telephone pole for a game of Dungeons & Dragons. When they get to the address on the flyer, the owner of the house locks them in his garage and forces them to play a game of D&D. While playing the game, Kaytranada appears as a holographic game piece to help the band members in their quest. During the game, the Dungeon Master who locked the band members in his garage walks outside to answer a phone call. While he is outside, one of the band members slips poison into the Dungeon Master's drink. When the DM returns, he takes a drink from his cup and hands the band members a gun, trying to force them to play a game of Russian roulette. Before the game of Russian Roulette can start, the DM dies from the poison. The music video ends with an advertisement for a Dungeon Master named John Dempsey located in the Greater Toronto Area. The video was one of the top ten finalists for the 2017 Prism Prize.

== Personnel ==
- Chester Hansen – bass guitar, CS-60, Yamaha organ
- Matthew Tavares – auxiliary synthesizer
- Alex Sowinski – drums, percussion
- Leland Whitty – acoustic guitar, electric guitar
- Kaytranada – CS-60, percussion

== Snoop Dogg remix ==
Snoop Dogg released a remix of "Lavender" titled "Lavender (Nightfall Remix)" with a music video on March 12, 2017. The beginning of the video shows a clown family and follows the father (played by Michael Rapaport), who smokes weed while stressed. After the father encounters a clown policeman, he is shot dead with a glitter gun while a bystander films the incident. The video cuts to "The Clown House", where Ronald Klump, a clown parody version of Donald Trump, holds a press conference concerning the deportation of all "doggs". In the video, Snoop Dogg sees Klump and his henchmen outside, and then grabs a gun and aims it at Klump. He pulls the trigger and a flag with the word "bang" pops out. Klump is later seen in chains.

The song was included in Snoop's album Neva Left, released on May 19, 2017. Conservative politicians and commentators criticized the video's mock assassination of Ronald Klump, a parody of Donald Trump. On March 15, 2017, President Donald Trump wrote on Twitter, "Can you imagine what the outcry would be if @SnoopDogg, failing career and all, had aimed and fired the gun at President Obama? Jail time!" Trump's lawyer Michael Cohen called the video "totally disgraceful" and called for Snoop to apologize. Some artists, including T.I. and Talib Kweli, defended Snoop's video. The rapper Common compared it to political statements made by Public Enemy and KRS-One.

== See also ==
- 99.9%
- Dungeons & Dragons in popular culture
