= At All =

At All may refer to:

- At All, a 2008 album by Viggo Mortensen
- "At All", a 2013 song by Kaytranada
