= Lavender (Nightfall Remix) =

2017 Snoop Dogg song

Single by BadBadNotGood featuring Kaytranada and Snoop Dogg

from the album Neva Left
- Released: March 12, 2017
- Genre: Jazz; hip hop
- Length: 3:15
- Label: Doggystyle; Empire
- Songwriters: Snoop Dogg; BadBadNotGood; Kaytranada

"Lavender (Nightfall Remix)" is a 2017 song by American rapper Snoop Dogg. It is a remixed version of the BadBadNotGood (BBNG) song "Lavender" with lyrics added addressing the issue of police brutality in the United States. Its music video was controversial because of a scene depicting a mock assassination of a parody version of U.S. President Donald Trump. The song was included in Snoop's 2017 album Neva Left.

== Background ==
During a video game event in October 2016, the American rapper Snoop Dogg and American YouTuber Jesse Wellens paused for a smoking session. During this time, Wellens proposed a music video with clowns, inspired by the shooting of Philando Castile. Three days later, Snoop sent Wellens his own version of "Lavender" with lyrics referencing police brutality. Wellens later told Billboard, "When I originally wrote the idea of the video, the video of [Philando Castile] getting shot came out online and it was causing riots. We just kind of wanted to bring the clowns out, because it's clownery."

In late October 2016, Snoop previewed his new song regarding police brutality on Instagram, sampling the beat of BBNG's "Lavender". Snoop said the song was meant to be "not controversial but real – real to the voice of the people who don't have a voice."

== Music video and release ==
The song was released on March 12, 2017, with a music video directed by Jesse Wellens and James DeFina. It depicts a world of clowns and "doggs". The beginning of the video shows a clown family and follows the father (played by Michael Rapaport), who smokes weed while stressed. After the father encounters a clown policeman, he is shot dead with a glitter gun while a bystander films the incident. The video cuts to "The Clown House", where Ronald Klump, a clown parody version of Donald Trump, holds a press conference calling for the deportation of all "doggs". In the video, Snoop Dogg sees Klump and his henchmen outside, and he grabs a gun and goes outside to aim it at Klump. When Snoop pulls the trigger, a flag with the word "bang" pops out. Klump is later seen in chains between Snoop and Jesse, who are smoking blunts.

The song was included in Snoop's album Neva Left, released on May 19, 2017.

== Controversy ==
Conservative politicians and commentators criticized the video's mock assassination of Ronald Klump, a parody of Donald Trump. Senator Marco Rubio (R-Florida) said, "We've had presidents assassinated before in this country, so anything like that, people should really be careful about that kind of thing." Senator Ted Cruz (R-Texas) said "I think it really is in poor taste to be making fun of murdering someone. Particularly assassinating the president." On March 15, 2017, President Donald Trump wrote on Twitter, "Can you imagine what the outcry would be if @SnoopDogg, failing career and all, had aimed and fired the gun at President Obama? Jail time!" Trump's lawyer Michael Cohen called the video "totally disgraceful" and called for Snoop to apologize. Fox News host Kimberly Guilfoyle suggested "killing" Snoop Dogg and Bow Wow over the video. The U.S. Secret Service told The Wrap that the agency was "aware of" the video. Jesse Wellens later said on the H3 Podcast that the Secret Service interviewed him and Snoop Dogg about the video.

On March 16, Snoop posted a video responding to the controversy, saying, "Now they wanna ask me questions and interview me, but guess what? I've got nothing to say, mate." Some artists, including T.I. and Talib Kweli, defended Snoop's video. Common compared it to political statements made by Public Enemy and KRS-One. Bow Wow tweeted, "Ayo @realDonaldTrump shut your punk ass up talking shit about my uncle @SnoopDogg before we pimp your wife and make her work for us," and deleted the tweet within 24 hours. While discussing his reaction to the video's ending, Ice-T said, "I was nervous. He's messing with the line. We'll see how this weighs out, but I roll with Snoop. I thought it was a good video."

== Critical reception ==
The rapper Treach called the video "artistic" and compared its comedy to Saturday Night Live skits. Spencer Kornhaber compared the reactions to the video to remarks made by Madonna at the Women's March on Washington about bombing the White House, arguing that they both show how strong political statements are used by one's political enemies to "portray Trump's critics as wackos." Amy Zimmerman of The Daily Beast wrote that the music video was "noticeably bereft of punchlines" and criticized its depiction of Trump, writing it "isn't amusing...so much as disturbing and deadly." Matthew Dessem, writing for Slate, called the video's execution "not bad" and said the video's clown gags gave it "a lurid effect that actually feels about right for this moment in time."

== Charts ==
Chart (2017)	Peak position
US Jazz Digital Songs (Billboard)	2

== See also ==
- Black Lives Matter
- Insane Clown President
- Make America Crip Again
- 2016 clown sightings
