= Keep It Playa =

Keep It Playa may refer to:

- Keep It Playa, the debut studio album by Saucy Santana
- "Keep It Playa", a song by Saucy Santana from the eponymous studio album
- "Keep It Playa", a song by Pharrell featuring Slim Thug on his 2006 album In My Mind
- "Keep It Playa", a song by Lou Phelps
