= 220 (EP) =

2018 extended play by Snoop Dogg

EP by Snoop Dogg
- Released: February 20, 2018
- Genres: West Coast hip hop; gangsta rap
- Length: 28:30
- Labels: Doggystyle; Empire
- Producers: My Guy Mars; Dr. Evo; October London; Ben Billions

Snoop Dogg chronology
Make America Crip Again (2017)	220 (2018)	Bible of Love (2018)

Singles from 220
- 1. "Everything" Released: February 9, 2018; 2. "Doggytails" Released: February 12, 2018; 3. "220" Released: February 24, 2018

220 is the third extended play by American rapper Snoop Dogg. The EP was released on February 20, 2018, by Doggystyle Records and Empire Distribution. It features guest appearances from Jacquees, Dreezy, LunchMoney Lewis, Hypnotic Brass Ensemble, and frequent collaborators Kokane, Goldie Loc, and October London.

== Background ==
Snoop Dogg announced the EP and its release date on February 19, 2018. The album's lead single, "Everything", was released on February 9, 2018.

== Critical response ==
Professional ratings
Review scores
Source	Rating
HotNewHipHop	4/5 stars

220 received a positive rating from music critic Phillip Mlynar of HotNewHipHop. He said that "While perhaps not as hungry as he was during his prime, Snoop Dogg has aged gracefully, owning his role as hip-hop's favorite uncle. Lyrically, he's still the same Snoop we all know and love; the iconic voice and infectious charisma never left."

== Track listing ==
Credits adapted from Tidal.

- Tracks produced by My Guy Mars, Dr. Evo, October London & Ben Billions.

No.	Title	Length
1.	"Intro"	2:34
2.	"Everything" (featuring Jacquees and Dreezy)	4:28
3.	"220" (featuring Goldie Loc)	4:41
4.	"Waves" (featuring October London)	3:47
5.	"I Don't Care" (featuring LunchMoney Lewis)	2:32
6.	"Doggytails" (featuring Kokane)	3:33
7.	"Motivation" (featuring Hypnotic Brass Ensemble)	3:26
8.	"On the Double"	3:29
Total length:		28:30
