= Bubba (album) =

Studio album by Kaytranada
- Released: December 13, 2019
- Recorded: 2016–2018
- Genres: Dance; electronic; pop; alternative R&B
- Length: 50:35
- Label: RCA
- Producer: Kaytranada

Kaytranada chronology
99.9% (2016)	Bubba (2019)	Kaytraminé (2023)

Alternative cover
- Physical edition cover

Singles from Bubba
- 1. "10%" Released: December 9, 2019; 2. "The Worst in Me" Released: October 7, 2020

Bubba (stylized in all caps) is the second studio album by the Canadian electronic music producer Kaytranada, released by RCA Records on December 13, 2019. The album's release was preceded by the release of the single "10%" which features singer Kali Uchis, which was released on December 9, 2019. In the lead-up to the album release, Igloofest, a winter music festival, announced Kaytranada as a surprise guest. Just after the album release, Kaytranada announced a one-day pop-up shop and DJ set in Montreal.

It won a Grammy Award for the Best Dance/Electronic Album category, while "10%" won Best Dance Recording at the 63rd Annual Grammy Awards on March 14, 2021. At the Juno Awards of 2021, it won the award for Dance Recording of the Year.

== Recording ==
In an interview with GQ, Kaytranada said that recording Bubba was a very different process to his previous album. Previously, songs would be edited on his laptop and sent remotely to collaborating artists for them to add their own ideas. With Bubba, recordings took place mainly in-studio with both the producer and the artist present. As a result, Kaytranada had to adapt to creating chemistry and personal relationships with artists in the studio.

In an interview with GQ, Kaytranada revealed that some of the artists on the previous album 99.9% turned down reappearances on Bubba. This changed the direction of the entire album, as it instead focused on the "Kaytranada sound", searching for and evolving his personal style of music. The result is a unique blend of neo-soul, hip-hop, Afrobeat, and other varying genres in a dance style that the artist describes as "funky".

== Musical style and themes ==
The Haitian-born Canadian producer Kaytranada expands on the house and techno genres to create modern Disco tracks, using what Billboard describes as an "inventive, funk-meets-electronica sound". An NPR review noted that, rather than adhering to any single genre, the album morphs between Afrobeat, house, funk, R&B, disco, hip hop, and others. These are ubiquitous styles found in the Nigerian popular genre, from where Afrobeat gains its heritage. Bubba relies on its Afrobeat elements to "build a physical experience" in its bass and instrumentation, and feels "chameleonic" in its range. The album is commonly described as "trance-like" and "psychedelic". In a Pitchfork review, it was said to "[push] the audience's boundaries away from what they are comfortable with".

Atwood Magazine noted that while Kaytranada's style is categorized as electronica, he deviates from the genre's usual audience of music festival goers, instead focusing on diversity and blending together different genres on each track. The Nation identified overarching themes of love, culture, and hiding behind masks, summarizing the album as thematically disconnected but emotionally "human". Individual songs do not thematically blend, but transition musically; for instance, consecutive tracks "What You Need" and "Vex Oh" give almost opposing views on love. Crack Magazine and NPR identify connections between Kaytranada's use of backbeats and synthesizers, and the evolution of R&B and post-Disco club music from the 1980s, especially in early underground DJs.

Kaytranada revealed the album was influenced by the events in his life after the release of 99.9%, including opening up about his sexuality, coming to terms with his newfound fame, and dealing with anxiety, stress, and depression as a result. Bubba focuses on themes of loneliness and being an outcast, which Kinfolk states to be what appeals most to his audience.

== Promotion ==
In the first year of its release, Bubba topped Billboard's Dance/Electronic Albums Chart. Kaytranada spoke out about his experience continuing producing for RCA records despite his experiences with depression from touring to promote his previous album.

The album was preceded by the single “10%”. This was followed by Kaytranada touring in Australia in January 2020 as part of the FOMO festival line-up in Adelaide, Sydney, Melbourne and Brisbane. More tour dates included the III Points Festival in Miami, Florida in May 2020, and the REBEL Entertainment complex in Toronto, Ontario, though both dates were postponed indefinitely due to the 2020 COVID-19 pandemic.

== Reception ==
Professional ratings
Aggregate scores
Source	Rating
AnyDecentMusic?	7.4/10
Metacritic	82/100
Review scores
Source	Rating
AllMusic	4/5 stars
Clash	7/10
Exclaim!	8/10
The Line of Best Fit	8/10
MusicOMH	4/5 stars
NME	4/5 stars
Paste	7.2/10
Pitchfork	8.1/10

Bubba received critical acclaim upon its release. At Metacritic, which assigns a normalized score out of 100 to all reviews from mainstream publications, the album received an average score of 82, based on 7 reviews, indicating "universal acclaim". Jonah Bromwich from Pitchfork compared the album to 99.9%, describing it as "another set of coherent, well-sequenced set of tracks without any major drop-offs, all the more impressive as the album runs more than 50 minutes", and writing that Kaytranada "blesses this woeful decade with one last great dance record." Max Freedman from Paste commented on the queer sound of the album, noting that "it's hard not to read some of its traits as directly stemming from just how much happens in the first three years after someone comes out." NPR described the album as "deeply human", a "welcome nod to the roots of dance music", and having a "last call", "end-of-the-night" feeling.

NME's review summarizes the album as being aimed more at Kaytranada's existing fans, rather than appealing to a new fan base. Paste magazine writes that “Bubba” does not deviate much from the formula established by “99.9%”. Clash Magazine also critiqued the album's brevity and unevenness. Some reviewers critiqued the closing track, "Midsection" (featuring Pharrell Williams), as being musically disconnected from the rest of the album.

== Impact ==
NPR writes that in the 1980s, club DJs needed to constantly satisfy a dynamic crowd with dynamic music. The innovations that were developed during this period are still relied upon by artists today. Tracks from Bubba, such as “What You Need”, demonstrate the relevance of producers’ ability to meet the ever-changing needs of the crowd. In a Rolling Stone review of the album, it is stated that the 80s track chopping techniques allow Kaytranada to express his own personal journey over the last four years. Kinfolk writes that the disco theme appeals to alternative and individual crowds, to which Kaytranada feels a sense of belonging, whilst the R&B and House elements of his music incorporate a much broader crowd. This achieves an overall sense of giving comfort to outsiders of a community through music, as interpreted by NPR.

The blend between R&B and Afrobeat production on the album develops tracks into music that isn't just heard but is also felt as NPR states. NPR also writes that listening to the album becomes a physical experience of feeling the thumping beat and hearing the melodic accompaniment.

Alternatively, some reviewers feel that elements of the album do not work together and at times production elements can get in the way of each other as a review by KEYMAG states. In this review, KEYMAG reviews the album as “stifled with moments of utter inertia”. KEYMAG similarly lends some criticism to “Midsection” and the incorporation of Pharrell Williams’ falsetto into the track.

== Track listing ==
Standard edition
No.	Title	Writer(s)	Featured artist(s)	Length
1.	"Do It"	Louis Celestin; Lekan Parsons		2:12
2.	"2 the Music"	Celestin; Iman Omari	Iman Omari	3:55
3.	"Go DJ"	Celestin; Sir Farris	Sir	2:36
4.	"Gray Area"	Celestin; Jayson Jenkins	Mick Jenkins	2:19
5.	"Puff Lah"	Celestin		1:53
6.	"10%"	Celestin; Karly Loaiza; Colin Leonard; Mckinley Jackson; Melvin Steals; Mervin Steals	Kali Uchis	3:06
7.	"Need It"	Celestin; Micah Davis	Masego	2:17
8.	"Taste"	Celestin; Ivana Nwokike; Jessica Nwokike	VanJess	3:37
9.	"Oh No"	Celestin; Estelle Swaray	Estelle	2:47
10.	"What You Need"	Celestin; Charlotte Wilson	Charlotte Day Wilson	3:03
11.	"Vex Oh"	Celestin; D'Anthony Carlos; Emmanuel Isong; Ariowa Irosogie	GoldLink; Eight9fly; Ari PenSmith	2:42
12.	"Scared to Death"	Celestin; Willie Lee Jr.		2:33
13.	"Freefall"	Celestin; Durand Bernarr	Durand Bernarr	3:01
14.	"Culture"	Celestin; Teedra Moses; Taj Austin; Ras Austin	Teedra Moses	4:08
15.	"The Worst in Me"	Celestin; Tinashe Kachingwe	Tinashe	3:46
16.	"September 21"	Celestin		1:51
17.	"Midsection"	Celestin; Pharrell Williams; George Decimus; Pierre-Edouard Décimus	Pharrell Williams	4:49
Total length:				50:35

Instrumental version
No.	Title	Writer(s)	Length
1.	"2 the Music"	Louis Celestin	3:55
2.	"Go DJ"	Celestin	2:36
3.	"Gray Area"	Celestin	2:19
4.	"10%"	Celestin; Colin Leonard; Mckinley Jackson; Melvin Steals; Mervin Steals	3:06
5.	"Need It"	Celestin	2:17
6.	"Taste"	Celestin	3:37
7.	"Oh No"	Celestin	2:47
8.	"What You Need"	Celestin	3:03
9.	"Vex Oh"	Celestin	2:42
10.	"Freefall"	Celestin	3:01
11.	"Culture"	Celestin; Taj Austin; Ras Austin	4:08
12.	"The Worst in Me"	Celestin	3:46
13.	"Midsection"	Celestin; Pharrell Williams; George Decimus; Pierre-Edouard Décimus	4:49
Total length:			40:09

== Personnel ==
Credits adapted from Tidal.

- Kaytranada – production
- Colin Leonard – mastering engineering (track 6)

Rolling Stone lists Kaytranada collaborating with a range of artists on Bubba such as Pharrell Williams, Tinashe, GoldLink, Estelle, Mick Jenkins, SiR, Charlotte Day Wilson, Iman Omari, Masego, VanJess, Ari PenSmith, Eight9fly, Durand Bernarr, and Teedra Moses. Forbes notes that this is quite a large guest list for an R&B album. Forbes writes that this album demonstrates Kaytranada's ability to visualise the songs in their rudimentary stages and determine which artist suits the final version of the song.

== Charts ==
Chart (2019)	Peak position
Australian Albums (ARIA)	53
Belgian Albums (Ultratop Flanders)	81
Belgian Albums (Ultratop Wallonia)	194
Canadian Albums (Billboard)	21
Dutch Albums (Album Top 100)	34
French Albums (SNEP)	128
New Zealand Albums (RMNZ)	39
Swiss Albums (Schweizer Hitparade)	74
UK Albums (Official Charts)	68
US Billboard 200	56
US Top Dance Albums (Billboard)	1

== Certifications ==
Region	Certification	Certified units/sales
United Kingdom (BPI)	Silver	60,000^{‡}
^{‡} Sales+streaming figures based on certification alone.
