= Kinfolk (magazine) =

Lifestyle magazine for young professionals

- Cover of issue 49, September 2023
- Categories: Lifestyle
- Frequency: Quarterly
- Founder: Nathan Williams, Katie Searle-Williams, Doug Bischoff, Paige Bischoff
- Founded: 2011
- First issue: July 2011
- Country: United States
- Based in: Portland, Oregon
- Language: English, Japanese, Chinese and Korean
- Website: kinfolk.com
- OCLC: 881493286

Kinfolk is an independent slow lifestyle magazine published by Ouur and based in Portland, Oregon.

== Operations ==
Kinfolk was founded in July 2011 by two couples: Nathan Williams and Katie Searle-Williams, and Doug and Paige Bischoff. A lifestyle magazine aimed primarily at young professionals, it focuses on home, work, play, food and community through photo essays, recipes, interviews, profiles, personal stories and practical tips. An international pool of writers, photographers, designers, and chefs contribute to Kinfolk. Typically, more than 50 individuals contribute to each issue.

Released quarterly, each issue is seasonally themed, with all food, entertainment, and lifestyle content geared towards that theme. Articles include interviews with well-known chefs, accompanied by themed menus with recipes, illustrated guides to daily encounters and inspirational photo essays encouraging readers to try new activities.

In addition to its print publication, Kinfolk organizes monthly "community gathering" events that take place around the world, each based on a seasonal theme such as flower potlucks, butcher's block parties and campfire cooking. These events take place concurrently and aim to unite the global community of Kinfolk readers while also offering practical advice and lessons. The company also produces international food-based workshops, cookbooks and a short film series.

== Reception ==
Kinfolk has been praised for the quality of its graphic design and its photography. In 2014, Benjamin Tepler, writing in the Portland Monthly, described it as having created "a distinct ripple in the publishing world" with "an aesthetic all its own." Tim Murphy, a reporter for The New York Times, called it "the Martha Stewart Living of the Portland Set", writing that the city "may have officially out-twee'd itself" with Kinfolk.

== International versions ==
Kinfolk has an international readership. In addition to English, the magazine has published Chinese, Japanese, and Korean editions.

== Books ==
Since 2013, Kinfolk has produced several books:

- The Kinfolk Table: Recipes for Small Gatherings (Artisan Books, 2013), containing 85 traditional recipes contributed by its global readership.
- The Kinfolk Home: Interiors for Slow Living (Artisan Books, 2015), an interior design survey of international scope.
- The Kinfolk Entrepreneur: Ideas for Meaningful Work (Artisan Books, 2017).
- The Kinfolk Garden: How to Live with Nature (Artisan Books, 2020).
- Kinfolk Travel: Slower Ways to See the World (Artisan Books, 2021), a book of travel planning tips.

== Other magazines ==
In June 2021, Kinfolk published the first issue of Kindling, a magazine for 'people with children'. As of July 2022, three issues of Kindling have been published.

== Magazine issues ==
Issue Number	Date of release	Theme of Issue
1	1 January 2011	A Guide for Small Gatherings
2	7 February 2012	A Guide for Small Gatherings
3	27 March 2012	A Guide for Small Gatherings
4	3 July 2012	A Guide for Small Gatherings
5	2 October 2012	Senses
6	27 November 2012	A Guide for Small Gatherings
7	27 March 2012	Ice Cream
8	16 June 2013	Japan
9	10 September 2013	The Weekend Issue
10	3 December 2013	Aged
11	4 March 2014	Home
12	3 June 2014	Saltwater
13	2 September 2014	Imperfect
14	25 November 2014	Winter
15	3 Mar 2015	Entrepreneur
16	2 June 2015	Essentials
17	1 September 2015	Family
18	24 November 2015	Design
19	1 March 2016	Adrenaline
20	7 June 2016	Travel
21	16 September 2016	Home (II)
22	29 November 2016	Work Special
23	7 March 2017	Weekend Special
24	6 June 2017	Relationships
25	5 September 2017	The Food Issue
26	28 November 2017	The Sport Issue
27	6 March 2018	The Paris Issue
28	5 June 2018	Hair
29	4 September 2018	Print
30	28 November 2018	Hospitality
31	1 March 2019	Architecture
32	1 June 2019	Tokyo
33	10 Sep 2019	Education
34	12 December 2019	Intimacy
35	10 March 2020	Change
36	9 Jun 2020	Movement
37	8 September 2020	Nature
38	1 December 2020	Rituals
39	9 March 2021	Youth
40	8 June 2021	10th Anniversary Edition
41	7 September 2021	The Mediterranean
42	7 December 2021	Technology
43	15 March 2022	The Mind
44	14 June 2022	The Weather
45	13 September 2022	The Great Outdoors
46		
47		
48		
49		
50		
