= Kaytraminé =

Studio album by Kaytraminé
- Released: May 19, 2023
- Recorded: 2021
- Studio: Home studio, Malibu, California
- Length: 33:49
- Label: CLBN; Kaytranada; Venice
- Producer: Kaytranada; Aminé; Pharrell Williams

Aminé chronology
| TwoPointFive (2021) | Kaytraminé (2023) | 13 Months of Sunshine (2025) |

Kaytranada chronology
| Intimidated (2021) | Kaytraminé (2023) | Timeless (2024) |

Singles from Kaytraminé
- 1. "4eva" Released: April 7, 2023; 2. "Rebuke" Released: May 15, 2023

Kaytraminé is the debut album by the duo of the same name, consisting of American rapper Aminé and Haitian-Canadian record producer Kaytranada. It was released on May 19, 2023, by CLBN, Kaytranada, and Venice Music, and features guest musicians Big Sean, Amaarae, Snoop Dogg, Freddie Gibbs, and Pharrell Williams. The album was nominated for Rap Album/EP of the Year at the 2024 Juno Awards.

== Background ==
The first connection between the duo came when Aminé released an unofficial remix of Kaytranada's song "At All" in 2014. Kaytranada produced three songs from Aminé's 2015 mixtape Calling Brio. Kaytranada also produced the Rejjie Snow album Dear Annie, which included the Aminé-featuring song "Egyptian Luvr".

== Recording ==
The duo rented a house in Malibu, California, in 2021, where they recorded together nonstop for two weeks. Kaytranada composed instrumentals during the daytime and Aminé wrote lyrics to them at night. Kaytranada took several months to find samples for the album, including pieces from Bollywood films.

=== Style ===
The album took inspiration from sources including jazz pianist Bob James and rapper Don Toliver.

== Release ==
On April 4, 2023, both artists shared a teaser video to social media in which Kaytranada remixed the two's names together into their combined duo name and Aminé danced along. The posts were captioned "Kaytraminé by Kaytraminé, coming soon". On April 7, they released the album's lead single, "4eva" featuring Pharrell Williams, along with announcing a release date of May 12. On May 9, they released the album's cover art and track listing and announced the album's new release date on May 19. The second single, "Rebuke", was released May 15. The album was released on May 19 by CLBN, Kaytranada, and Venice Music. The instrumental version was released on September 15, 2023.

== Live ==
On April 14, 2023, Kaytranada had a set at Coachella 2023. During that set, he brought out Aminé as a guest, where the duo performed the live debut of "4eva". On July 12, the duo announced a five-date tour with stops at their hometowns of Montreal and Portland, as well as performances in Chicago, New York and Los Angeles.

== Reception ==
Kaytraminé ratings
Aggregate scores
| Source | Rating |
|---|---|
| AnyDecentMusic? | 7.5/10 |
Review scores
| Source | Rating |
| AllMusic | 3/5 stars |
| American Songwriter | 4/5 stars |
| Clash | 8/10 |
| Exclaim! | 8/10 |
| The Guardian | 4/5 stars |
| HipHopDX | 3.5/5 |
| The Line of Best Fit | 8/10 |
| NME | 4/5 stars |
| Pitchfork | 7.3/10 |
| Slant Magazine | 4/5 stars |

Kaytraminé was included on the long list for the 2024 Polaris Music Prize.

=== Year-end lists ===
Kaytraminé on year-end lists
| Publication | # | Ref. |
|---|---|---|
| Billboard | 14 | |
| Business Insider | 5 | |
| Clash | 60 | |
| Esquire | 5 | |
| Exclaim! | 34 | |
| The Line of Best Fit | 41 | |
| NME | 31 | |
| Rolling Stone | 38 | |
| Uproxx | —N/a | |

== Track listing ==
All lyrics are written by Adam Aminé Daniel with others noted; all music is composed by Daniel and Louis Kevin Celestin. All music is produced by Kaytranada with others noted.

Kaytraminé track listing
| No. | Title | Lyrics | Producers | Length |
|---|---|---|---|---|
| 1. | "Who He Iz" | | | 3:01 |
| 2. | "Letstalkaboutit" (featuring Freddie Gibbs) | Fredrick Jamel Tipton | | 2:47 |
| 3. | "4eva" (featuring Pharrell Williams) | Williams | Williams | 3:10 |
| 4. | "Westside" | | | 2:24 |
| 5. | "Master P" (featuring Big Sean) | Jahmarie Adams; Sean Michael Leonard Anderson | Aminé | 3:32 |
| 6. | "Rebuke" | | | 2:04 |
| 7. | "Sossaup" (featuring Amaarae) | Ama Serwah Genfi | | 2:36 |
| 8. | "STFU3" | | | 2:21 |
| 9. | "Ugh Ugh" | Karriem Riggins | | 4:10 |
| 10. | "Eye" (featuring Snoop Dogg) | Calvin Cordozar Broadus Jr. | | 2:40 |
| 11. | "K&A" | | | 5:04 |
| Total length: | | | | 33:49 |

== Personnel ==
=== Musicians ===
- Aminé – vocals
- Freddie Gibbs – vocals (2)
- Pharrell Williams – vocals (3)
- Big Sean – vocals (5)
- Amaarae – vocals (7)
- Snoop Dogg – vocals (10)

=== Technical ===
- Kaytranada – producer
- Aminé – producer (5)
- Pharrell Williams – producer (3)
- David Nakaji – mixing engineer
- Lauren D'Elia – mastering engineer, recording engineer (3–11)
- Emmanuel Gallegos – recording engineer
- Rafa Alvarez – recording engineer (1, 2, 4, 6, 8, 11)
- Aleksei Savchenko – recording engineer (1, 2, 4, 7, 11)
- Tom Kahre – recording engineer (5)
- Travis Shaggy Marshall – recording engineer (10)

== Charts ==
Chart performance for Kaytraminé
| Chart (2023) | Peak position |
|---|---|
| Belgian Albums (Ultratop Flanders) | 53 |
| Belgian Albums (Ultratop Wallonia) | 125 |
| Canadian Albums (Billboard) | 51 |
| Dutch Albums (Album Top 100) | 73 |
| Irish Albums (IRMA) | 96 |
| Lithuanian Albums (AGATA) | 69 |
| New Zealand Albums (RMNZ) | 9 |
| Swiss Albums (Schweizer Hitparade) | 35 |
| UK Albums (OCC) | 71 |
| US Billboard 200 | 92 |
| US Independent Albums (Billboard) | 16 |
| US Top R&B/Hip-Hop Albums (Billboard) | 41 |
