= Timeless (Kaytranada album) =

Studio album by Kaytranada
- Released: June 7, 2024
- Genre: Electronic; R&B; hip hop; house
- Length: 62:50
- Label: RCA
- Producer: Kaytranada

Kaytranada chronology
Kaytraminé (2023)	Timeless (2024)	Ain't No Damn Way! (2025)

Singles from Timeless
- 1. "Lover/Friend" Released: November 30, 2023; 2. "Stuntin" Released: December 1, 2023; 3. "Drip Sweat" Released: June 4, 2024

Timeless is the third studio album by the Canadian electronic music producer Kaytranada, released by RCA Records on June 7, 2024. A double album, it features collaborations with Rochelle Jordan, Lou Phelps, Durand Bernarr, Don Toliver, Charlotte Day Wilson, Ravyn Lenae, Channel Tres, Dawn Richard, Tinashe, Anderson .Paak, Sir, Childish Gambino, Thundercat, PinkPantheress, and Mariah the Scientist. The album received a nomination for Best Dance/Electronic Album at the 67th Annual Grammy Awards.

== Critical reception ==
Professional ratings
Aggregate scores
Source	Rating
AnyDecentMusic?	7.1/10
Metacritic	78/100
Review scores
Source	Rating
AllMusic	3.5/5 stars
Clash	8/10
Exclaim!	8/10
NME	4/5 stars
Pitchfork	7.3/10
The Guardian	4/5 stars
The Skinny	3/5 stars
Spin	A−

Timeless received generally positive reviews from music critics. On Metacritic, which assigns a weighted mean score based on ratings from publications, the album scored 78 out of 100 based on 9 reviews, indicating "generally favorable reviews".

Writing for Exclaim!, Wesley Mclean rated the album 8 out of 10, stating: "While it may be early to qualify his style or sound as timeless, it's managed to stand the test for the past 10 years and he's done nothing but hone his skills." Skye Butchard from The Skinny (magazine) wrote: "At its best, that ‘timeless’ tag works. Nods to house, disco, and hip-hop retain the sweaty human touch of older party songs – think organic instruments, crackling samples and unquantized beats. It's body music that doesn't lose track of the present in search of something lasting."

=== Year-end lists ===
Select year-end rankings for Timeless
Publication/critic	Accolade	Rank	Ref.
Billboard	Best Albums of 2024	37	
Rolling Stone	The 100 Best Albums of 2024	40	

== Track listing ==
Timeless track listing CD/LP
No.	Title	Writer(s)	Length
1.	"Pressure"	Louis Kevin Celestin; Bill Schnee; Dana Stinson; John Bowman; Michael Melvoin; Reggie Noble	1:58
2.	"Spit It Out" (featuring Rochelle Jordan)	Celestin; Bobby Byrd; Erasmo Esteves; James Brown; Miguel Atwood-Ferguson; Roberto Braga; Rochelle Jordan; Rush Davis; Ronald Lenhoff	3:38
3.	"Call U Up" (featuring Lou Phelps)	Celestin; José Martinez; Lou Phelps	2:58
4.	"Weird" (featuring Durand Bernarr)	Celestin; Bernarr Ferebee Jr.; Phelps	3:27
5.	"Dance Dance Dance Dance"	Celestin; Brian Holland; Edith Wayne; Harold Beatty	1:42
6.	"Feel a Way" (featuring Don Toliver)	Celestin; Caleb Toliver; Dave Sarkys; Georges Rodi	3:16
7.	"Still" (featuring Charlotte Day Wilson)	Celestin; Charlotte Day Wilson; Jimmy Webb	2:14
8.	"Video" (featuring Ravyn Lenae)	Celestin; Ravyn Lenae	3:12
9.	"Seemingly"	Celestin; Don Blackman	3:17
10.	"Drip Sweat" (featuring Channel Tres)	Celestin; Channel Tres; J. Brown; Rahul Dev Burman	2:27
11.	"Hold On" (featuring Dawn Richard)	Celestin; Dawn Richard; Tommy Paxton-Beesley	3:16
12.	"Please Babe"	Celestin; Carlos Corales	2:46
13.	"Stepped On"	Celestin	3:01
14.	"More Than a Little Bit" (featuring Tinashe)	Celestin; Tinashe Kachingwe	2:54
15.	"Do 2 Me" (featuring Anderson .Paak and Sir)	Celestin; Alissia Benveniste; Brandon Anderson; Christopher Wallace; Ernesto Rodríguez Dumont; Maurice Brown; Om'Mas Keith; Sean Combs; Sir Darryl Farris; Steven Jordan	3:50
16.	"Witchy" (featuring Childish Gambino)	Celestin; B. Holland; Donald Glover; Eddie Holland; Lamont Dozier	3:47
17.	"Lover/Friend" (featuring Rochelle Jordan)	Celestin; Jordan; Rush Davis	4:19

Digital and Streaming/Disc 2 physical version only
No.	Title	Writer(s)	Length
18.	"Wasted Words" (featuring Thundercat)	Celestin; Stephen Lee Bruner	1:27
19.	"Snap My Finger" (featuring PinkPantheress)	Celestin; Victoria Walker	3:21
20.	"Stuntin" (featuring Channel Tres)	Celestin; Channel Tres; Jerome Castille; Maurice Powell	3:02
21.	"Out of Luck" (featuring Mariah the Scientist)	Celestin; Mariah Buckles	2:58
Total length:			62:50

- Bonus tracks (Disc 2) were only available on the physical CD version. On the LP version they are available as a download with a card with a code. As of now, the bonus tracks are available on streaming.

== Personnel ==
- Kaytranada – production
- River Tiber – additional production (track 11)
- Alissia – additional production, bass, keyboards (track 15)
- Bebo Dumot – additional production, keyboards, percussion (track 15)
- Maurice Brown – additional production (track 15)
- Om'Mas Keith – additional production (track 15)
- Lauren D'Elia – mastering, engineering (all tracks); vocal production (tracks 1, 2, 4, 6–8, 11, 13, 14, 16, 18, 19, 21), vocal engineering (2, 4, 11)
- Neal H Pogue – mixing
- Derek "206derek" Anderson – mixing, vocal engineering (track 6)
- Rafael Alvarez – engineering (tracks 1, 3, 5)
- Different Sleep – engineering (tracks 2, 3, 11), vocal engineering (2, 3, 11, 13)
- Zachary Acosta – engineering assistance
- Ryan "Mellow" Venable – vocal engineering (track 6)
- Charlotte Day Wilson – vocal engineering (track 7)
- Bryan Schwaller – vocal engineering (track 8)
- Julian Cruz – vocal engineering (track 16)
- Jonny Breakwell – vocal engineering (track 19)
- Miguel Atwood-Ferguson – strings (track 2)

== Charts ==
=== Weekly charts ===
Weekly chart performance for Timeless
Chart (2024)	Peak position
Australian Albums (ARIA)	42
Australian Dance Albums (ARIA)	2
Belgian Albums (Ultratop Flanders)	64
Belgian Albums (Ultratop Wallonia)	149
Canadian Albums (Billboard)	30
Danish Albums (Hitlisten)	37
Dutch Albums (Album Top 100)	23
New Zealand Albums (RMNZ)	25
Portuguese Albums (AFP)	42
Swiss Albums (Schweizer Hitparade)	16
UK Albums (OCC)	41
UK R&B Albums (OCC)	28
US Billboard 200	28
US Top Dance Albums (Billboard)	2
US Top R&B/Hip-Hop Albums (Billboard)	6

=== Year-end charts ===
Year-end chart performance for Timeless
Chart (2024)	Position
Australian Dance Albums (ARIA)	41
