= Neva Left =

Studio album by Snoop Dogg
- Released: May 19, 2017
- Recorded: 2016–17 (1996 for Vapors DJ Battlecat Remix)
- Genres: West Coast hip-hop; gangsta rap; G-funk
- Length: 61:17
- Labels: Doggy Style; Empire
- Producers: Snoop Dogg (also exec.); BadBadNotGood; Big Bub; Brody Brown; Dr. Evo; DJ Battlecat; Jahlil Beats; J-Massive; Kaytranada; Mars; Mike & Keys; Musik MajorX; League of Starz; Rick Rock

Snoop Dogg chronology
Coolaid (2016)	Neva Left (2017)	Make America Crip Again (2017)

Singles from Neva Left
- 1. "Promise You This" Released: March 1, 2017; 2. "Lavender (Nightfall Remix)" Released: March 12, 2017; 3. "Mount Kushmore" Released: April 25, 2017; 4. "Swivel" Released: May 15, 2017

Professional ratings
Aggregate scores
Source	Rating
Metacritic	71/100
Review scores
Source	Rating
XXL Magazine	7/10
AllHipHop	4.5/5 stars
Rolling Stone	2.5/5 stars
Pitchfork	7.0/10
Exclaim!	6/10

Neva Left is the fifteenth studio album by American rapper Snoop Dogg. It was released on May 19, 2017, for digital download and July 7, 2017, for purchase on CD, by Doggystyle Records and Empire Distribution. Snoop Dogg enlisted a variety of guest vocalists including Redman, Method Man, B-Real, KRS-One, and frequent collaborators Charlie Wilson and Wiz Khalifa, among others. Meanwhile, production was handled by Dr. Evo, DJ Battlecat, Musik MajorX, League of Starz, and Rick Rock, among others.

== Background ==
The album's release date and artwork was unveiled on April 24, 2017. The cover features a 1992 photograph of Snoop Dogg standing beside a California State Route 187 road sign. This is a reference to the California penal code.

== Promotion ==
=== Singles ===
"Promise You This" was released on March 1, 2017, as the first single. "Lavender (Nightfall Remix)", a remix of "Lavender" by BADBADNOTGOOD also featuring Kaytranada, followed as the second single on March 12, 2017, with an accompanying music video. "Mount Kushmore" featuring Redman, Method Man, and B-Real, was made available for purchase as the third single on April 25, 2017, along with the pre-order of the album. A music video for 'Moment I Feared' was released on June 21, 2017.

== Commercial performance ==
Neva Left debuted at number 54 on the Billboard 200, with over 11,000 album-equivalent units. It was the 13th best-selling digital album of the week.

== Track listing ==
Credits, Samples and Notes all adapted from the booklet.

Neva Left
No.	Title	Writer(s)	Producer(s)	Length
1.	"Neva Left"	Calvin Broadus; Michael Cox, Jr.; John Groover, Jr.; David Porter; Isaac Hayes	Mike & Keys	5:06
2.	"Moment I Feared" (featuring Rick Rock)	Broadus; Ricardo Thomas	Rick Rock	2:27
3.	"Bacc in da Dayz" (featuring Big Tray Deee)	Broadus; J.Massey; Tracy Davis; Roger Ball; Malcolm Duncan; Kamaal Ibn John Fareed; Steve Ferrone; Alan Gorrie; Ali Shaheed Jones-Muhammad; Owen McIntyre; Minnie Riperton; Richard Rudolph; James Stuart; Malik Izaak Taylor; Leon Ware	J-Massive	3:49
4.	"Promise You This"	Broadus; Regis Bell	Dupri of League of Starz	2:53
5.	"Trash Bags" (featuring K Camp)	Broadus; Kristopher Campbell; Quinton Cook; Tim Wells, Jr.	Musik MajorX	3:27
6.	"Swivel" (featuring Stresmatic)	Broadus; Thomas Jackson; Thomas	Rick Rock	4:16
7.	"Go On" (featuring October London)	Broadus; Jared Samuel Eskrine; Christopher Brody Brown	Brody Brown	3:10
8.	"Big Mouth"	Broadus; Kevin Gilliam	DJ Battlecat	4:01
9.	"Toss It" (featuring Too $hort and Nef the Pharaoh)	Broadus; Todd Shaw; Tonee Hayes; Donté Blacksher	DNYC3 of League of Starz	3:14
10.	"420 (Blaze Up)" (featuring Devin the Dude, Wiz Khalifa, and DJ Battlecat)	Broadus; Devin Copeland; Cameron Thomaz; Gilliam; Lamar Edwards	DJ Battlecat; Mars	4:25
11.	"Lavender (Nightfall Remix)" (featuring BadBadNotGood and Kaytranada)	Broadus; Louis Celestin; Chester Hansen; Alex Sowinski; Matthew Tavares; Leland Whitty	BadBadNotGood; Kaytranada	3:15
12.	"Let Us Begin" (featuring KRS-One)	Broadus; Lawrence Parker; Gilliam; R. S. Lewis	DJ Battlecat	3:42
13.	"Mount Kushmore" (featuring Method Man, Redman, and B-Real)	Broadus; Reginald Noble; Louis Freese; Clifford Smith; J. Stella	Dr. Evo	3:48
14.	"Vapors (DJ Battlecat Remix)" (featuring Charlie Wilson and Teena Marie)	Antonio Hardy; Marlon Williams; Marcel Hall	DJ Battlecat	6:49
15.	"Still Here"	Broadus; Gilliam; Cliff Curry	DJ Battlecat	3:32
16.	"Love Around the World" (featuring Big Bub)	Broadus; Lee Drakeford; Larry Mizell	Big Bub	3:23
Total length:				61:17

Physical copy bonus track
No.	Title	Producer(s)	Length
17.	"Transition"	Jahlil Beats	3:47

Notes

- "420 (Blaze Up)" contains additional vocals by Shon Lawon
- "Let Us Begin" contains additional vocals by Janice Freeman
- "Mount Kushmore" features vocals by Steven J. Collins using a Talk box
- "Vapors (DJ Battlecat Remix)" features vocals by FatBoy SSE
- "I'm Still Here" features vocals by Kendrick Lamar

Sample credits

- "Neva Left" contains samples of "As Long As I've Got You" performed by The Charmels, written by David Porter and Isaac Hayes.
- "Bacc in da Dayz" contains a portion of the composition and samples of "Check the Rhime" performed by A Tribe Called Quest, written by Minnie Riperton, Richard Rudolph, Leon Ware, Ali Shaheed Jones-Muhammad, Kamaal Ibn John Fareed, Malik Izaak Taylor, Owen Mcintyre, Malcolm Duncan, Roger Ball, James Stuart, Steve Ferrone and Alan Gorrie.
- "Let Us Begin" contains interpolations from "My Philosophy" performed by KRS-One, written by Lawrence Parker.
- "Vapors (DJ Battlecat Remix)" embodies the composition "Vapors" performed by Biz Markie, written by Antonio Hardy, Marlon Williams and Marcel Hall.
- "Still Here" contains samples of "I'm Still Here" performed by The Notations, written by Cliff Curry.
- "Love Around the World" contains a sample from the recording of "When I'm with You" performed by Brenda Lee Eager, written by Larry Mizell.

== Charts ==
Chart (2017)	Peak position
Australian Albums (ARIA)	94
Belgian Albums (Ultratop Flanders)	78
Belgian Albums (Ultratop Wallonia)	148
Canadian Albums (Billboard)	39
Dutch Albums (Album Top 100)	51
French Albums (SNEP)	96
New Zealand Heatseekers Albums (RMNZ)	4
UK R&B Albums (Official Charts)	6
US Billboard 200	54
US Top Album Sales (Billboard)	31
US Independent Albums (Billboard)	6
US Top R&B/Hip-Hop Albums (Billboard)	26

== See also ==
- 2017 in hip-hop
