= Make America Crip Again =

EP by Snoop Dogg
- Released: October 27, 2017
- Recorded: 2017
- Genres: West Coast hip hop; gangsta rap
- Length: 29:26
- Labels: Doggystyle; Empire
- Producers: Snoop Dogg (also exec.); Ben Billions; Dâm-Funk; Don City; Franco Valli; Kid Capri; Kym Williams; Los; Mars; Niggarachi; Schife

Snoop Dogg chronology
Neva Left (2017)	Make America Crip Again (2017)	220 (2018)

Singles from Make America Crip Again
- 1. "Dis Finna Be a Breeze!" Released: September 29, 2017; 2. "M.A.C.A." Released: October 23, 2017

Make America Crip Again is the second extended play by American rapper Snoop Dogg. The EP was released on October 27, 2017, by Doggystyle Records and Empire Distribution. It features guest appearances from Chris Brown, O.T. Genasis and October London, among others, with production from Kid Capri and Dâm-Funk, among others. It was preceded by two singles, "Dis Finna Be a Breeze!" and "M.A.C.A.".

== Background ==
In an interview with Rolling Stone, Snoop Dogg explained the EP's title, by stating

It's not a statement or a political act: it's just good music. Certain people feel like we should make America 'great again', but that time they're referring to always takes me back to separation and segregation so I'd rather Make America Crip Again. In my lifetime, that's when young black men in impoverished areas organized to help their communities and to take care of their own because society basically left them for dead. A lot of people glorify the gang-banging and violence but forget that in the beginning, the Crips' main and sole purpose was to be the reflection of the Black Panthers. They looked after kids, provided after-school activities, fed them and stepped in as role models and father figures.

== Artwork ==
The cover of the original MP3 release features a blue baseball cap with the words "Make America Crip Again", a reference to "Make America Great Again" hats worn by Donald Trump supporters.

The album cover, released October 31, 2017, features Snoop Dogg standing behind a corpse with an identification tag reading "Trump". The cover is an homage to Ice Cube's 1991 album Death Certificate.

== Singles ==
The lead single, "Dis Finna Be a Breeze!" featuring comedian Ha Ha Davis was released on September 29, 2017.

The second single, "M.A.C.A." was released on October 23, 2017.

== Track listing ==
Make America Crip Again
No.	Title	Producer(s)	Length
1.	"M.A.C.A."	Ben Billions; Schife^{[a]}	3:17
2.	"3's Company" (featuring Chris Brown and O.T. Genasis)	Don City	4:05
3.	"Good Foot"	Kid Capri	3:31
4.	"Dis Finna Be a Breeze!" (featuring Ha Ha Davis)	Niggarachi; Mars^{[a]}; Franco Valli^{[a]}	2:47
5.	"None of Mine"	Ben Billions	3:20
6.	"My Last Name" (featuring October London)	Los	3:13
7.	"SportsCenter (Remix)" (featuring DesignerFlow)	Kym Williams	4:34
8.	"Fly Away" (featuring Shon Lawon)	DāM-FunK	4:39
Total length:			29:26

Notes

- ^{^[a]} signifies a co-producer

Sample credits

- "M.A.C.A." contains a sample of "La Di Da Di", as performed by Doug E. Fresh and MC Ricky D and interpolations of "Hey Young World", as performed by Slick Rick.
