= Ain't No Damn Way! =

Studio album by Kaytranada
- Released: August 15, 2025
- Genre: House
- Length: 35:25
- Label: RCA
- Producer: Kaytranada

Kaytranada chronology
Timeless (2024)	Ain't No Damn Way! (2025)

Singles from Ain't No Damn Way!
- 1. "Backstabs" Released: April 2021; 2. "Space Invader" Released: August 12, 2025

Ain't No Damn Way! (stylized in all caps) is the fourth studio album by Canadian electronic music producer Kaytranada. The album was released on August 15, 2025, through RCA Records.

The album was announced on August 11, with the first single, "Space Invader" arriving shortly thereafter on August 12. Inspired by a sample of Latrelle and Kelis "My Life" the single showcases a hypnotic, house-inflected groove and highlights Kaytranada's production style.

Following his Grammy Awards nominated 2024 album Timeless, Ain't No Damn Way! marks Kaytranada's first full-length original release since then. He has described the album as designed for "workouts, dancing and studying for people that love beats," underscoring its instrumental, beat-driven orientation.

Simultaneously with the release, he announced a co-headlining North American tour with French electronic duo Justice set to begin on October 16 in Vancouver.

The album was longlisted for the 2026 Polaris Music Prize.

== Background and release ==
Kaytranada announced Ain't No Damn Way! on August 11, 2025, sharing its title and release timing via social media. The lead single, "Space Invader" was released the following day. "Backstabs" was previously released as a single in April 2021 by record club Vinyl Me, Please in collaboration with Pitchfork and Lexus.

== Artistic direction ==
In promotional comments, Kaytranada emphasized that the album is an intentional return to his dance-oriented roots, stating it is "strictly for workouts, dancing and studying and for people that love beats".

== Promotion and touring ==
Alongside the album release, Kaytranada announced a fall tour, co-headlined with Justice. The tour begins October 16 in Vancouver and includes stops in Seattle, Chicago, Brooklyn, Atlanta, Miami and more.

== Critical reception ==
Professional ratings
Aggregate scores
Source	Rating
Metacritic	79/100
Review scores
Source	Rating
Exclaim!	8/10
MusicOMH	4/5 stars
NME	4/5 stars
Pitchfork	7.6/10
Rolling Stone	3.5/5 stars

Ain't No Damn Way! received positive reviews from critics. At Metacritic, which assigns a normalized rating out of 100 to reviews from mainstream publications, the album received an average score of 79, based on 6 reviews, indicating "generally favorable reviews".

NME's Kyann-Sian Williams gave the album four stars rating out of five and wrote, "Ain't No Damn Way! goes a long way in proving why Kaytranada remains the scene's most influential conductor, tightening and loosening the groove with tiny gestures: a clipped snare here, a sudden synth swell there. Without special guests this time around, he doubles down on what he does best: directing the dancefloor with precision, patience and pure instinct. Andrew Ryce of Pitchfork wrote, "Every drum hits with purpose, the basslines walk and burrow every which way, samples and voices are embedded in strange but intuitive ways. It's a beat tape that works as pop music for a generation of fans who have been conditioned to view instrumental electronic music as worthy of their attention, too, thanks to prominent representatives like Celestin himself."

== Track listing ==
Ain't No Damn Way! track listing
No.	Title	Writer(s)	Length
1.	"Space Invader"	Louis Kevin Celestin; Chad Hugo; Kelis Rogers; Pharrell Williams	4:36
2.	"Championship"	Celestin; Christopher Franke; Edgar Froese; Johannes Schmoelling	1:58
3.	"Home"	Celestin; Alex Sowinski	2:16
4.	"Target Joint"	Celestin	2:25
5.	"Things"	Celestin; Steve Monite	3:14
6.	"Backstabs"	Celestin	3:23
7.	"Good Luck"	Celestin; Karriem Riggins	1:50
8.	"Shine Your Light for We"	Daryl Hill; Scott Kinchin; Tony Sepe; Barry White	3:14
9.	"Goodbye Bitch!"	Celestin	2:49
10.	"Don't Worry Babe / I Got U Babe"	Celestin; Lee Huston Jr.; Lee Huston Sr.; James Yancey	3:14
11.	"Blax"	Celestin	2:48
12.	"Do It (Again!)" (featuring TLC)	Celestin; Kenneth Edmonds; Jonathan Robinson	3:38
Total length:			35:25

=== Notes ===
- All track titles, with the exception of "Backstabs", are stylized in all caps.
- "Backstabs" is stylized as "backstABS".
- "Space Invader" contains a sample of "My Life", performed by Latrelle featuring Kelis.

== Personnel ==
Credits adapted from Tidal.

- Kaytranada – production, mixing
- Lauren D'Elia – mastering
- Alex Sowinski – drums on "Home"
- Karriem Riggins – drums on "Good Luck"

== Charts ==
Chart performance for Ain't No Damn Way!
Chart (2025)	Peak position
UK Dance Albums (Official Charts)	2
US Top Dance Albums (Billboard)	8

== Release history ==
Release dates and formats for Ain't No Damn Way!
Region	Date	Format(s)	Label	Ref.
Various	August 15, 2025	CD; LP; digital download; streaming	RCA	
