= Shay Lia =

French-Djiboutian singer

- Born: Shanice Dileita Mohamed; September 8, 1993 (age 33); France
- Origin: Montreal, Quebec, Canada
- Genres: Electronic; R&B; dance; Funk; house
- Occupations: singer-songwriter; record producer
- Family: Dileita Mohamed Dileita (father)

Shanice Dileita Mohamed (born September 8, 1993), known professionally as Shay Lia, is a French and Djiboutian singer-songwriter and record producer based in Montreal, Quebec, Canada. Her music incorporates R&B, funk, house, and electronic music and frequently collaborates with Kaytranada.

== Early life ==
Shanice Dileita Mohamed was born September 8, 1993 in France to an ethnic Afar father and a French mother. Her father is Dileita Mohamed Dileita, who served as Prime Minister of Djibouti from 2001 to 2006. At the age of four, Lia moved with her family to Djibouti City in Djibouti, where she was raised until the age of 18. She has described herself as French and Djiboutian and closely identifies with the Afar community.

Lia grew up in a musical household. Her mother had a background in ballet and introduced her to artists including Janet Jackson and Sade, while her father listened to reggae and jazz. During her adolescence, she used YouTube to discover music, performances, interviews, and artists from outside Djibouti. Lia has cited Janet Jackson, Sade, Aaliyah, Stevie Wonder, Marvin Gaye, Kali Uchis, Masego, Kehlani, and Buddy as musical influences.

At the age of 18, Lia moved to Canada to attend the Université du Québec à Montréal in Montreal, Quebec where she studied sociology and communications. While at university, she began writing songs and developed an interest in pursuing music professionally. She initially kept her singing private before sharing recordings online, including through SoundCloud.

== Career ==
While living in Montreal, Lia became acquainted with producer Kaytranada. After seeing a video of Lia singing, he asked her whether she wrote songs and subsequently sent her instrumental tracks to work with.

Lia wrote the melody and lyrics for "Leave Me Alone", which was released on Kaytranada's debut studio album 99.9% in 2016. She also appeared as a dancer in Kaytranada's 2013 Boiler Room performance.

In 2018, Lia released several solo singles, including "The Cycle", produced by Sango. She was also featured on Kaytranada's single "Chances", which she co-wrote with Tony Stone. Lia and Kaytranada received a nomination for the SOCAN Songwriting Prize for the song in 2019.

Lia released her debut extended play, Dangerous, in May 2019. The EP was longlisted for the 2019 Polaris Music Prize.

In 2020, Lia released her second EP, Solaris. She described the project as incorporating Afrobeats and R&B. She has also collaborated with artists including Nigerian singer Adekunle Gold and Dutch singer Leven Kali.

In 2023, Lia released her debut studio album, FACETS.

== Discography ==
=== EPs ===
- Dangerous (2019)
- Solaris (2020)

=== Albums ===
- FACETS (2023)
