= The Celestics =

Canadian hip hop duo

- Origin: Montreal, Quebec, Canada
- Genres: Hip hop; alternative hip hop
- Years active: 2011–present
- Labels: HW&W
- Members: Kaytranada; Lou Phelps
- Website: soundcloud.com/the-celestics

The Celestics are a Canadian hip hop duo from Montreal. Formed in 2011, the duo is composed of two brothers, rapper Lou Phelps and producer/DJ Kaytranada. Their debut studio project, titled Massively Massive, was independently released in 2011. The Celestics released their second project, titled Supreme Laziness, on May 20, 2014.

== Career ==
=== 2011–2014: Early beginnings ===
The Celestics began as Louie P. & Kaytradamus. They independently released their first project titled Massively Massive via BandCamp in 2011.

=== 2014–present: Supreme Laziness and 001: Experiments ===
On May 20, 2014 the duo released their second project titled Supreme Laziness. The project featured guest appearances from GoldLink, Dudley Doo, Nana Zen, Costa Joe & ST

On April 20, 2017, Lou Phelps released his debut solo project titled 001: Experiments – the project was produced entirely by Kaytranada. The project featured guest appearances by Bishop Nehru, Innanet James and Kallitechnis.

== Personal life ==
Lou Phelps is the younger brother of Kaytranada.

== Discography ==
- Massively Massive (2011)
- Supreme Laziness (2014)
