= Kaytranada =

Haitian and Canadian DJ and music producer (born 1992)

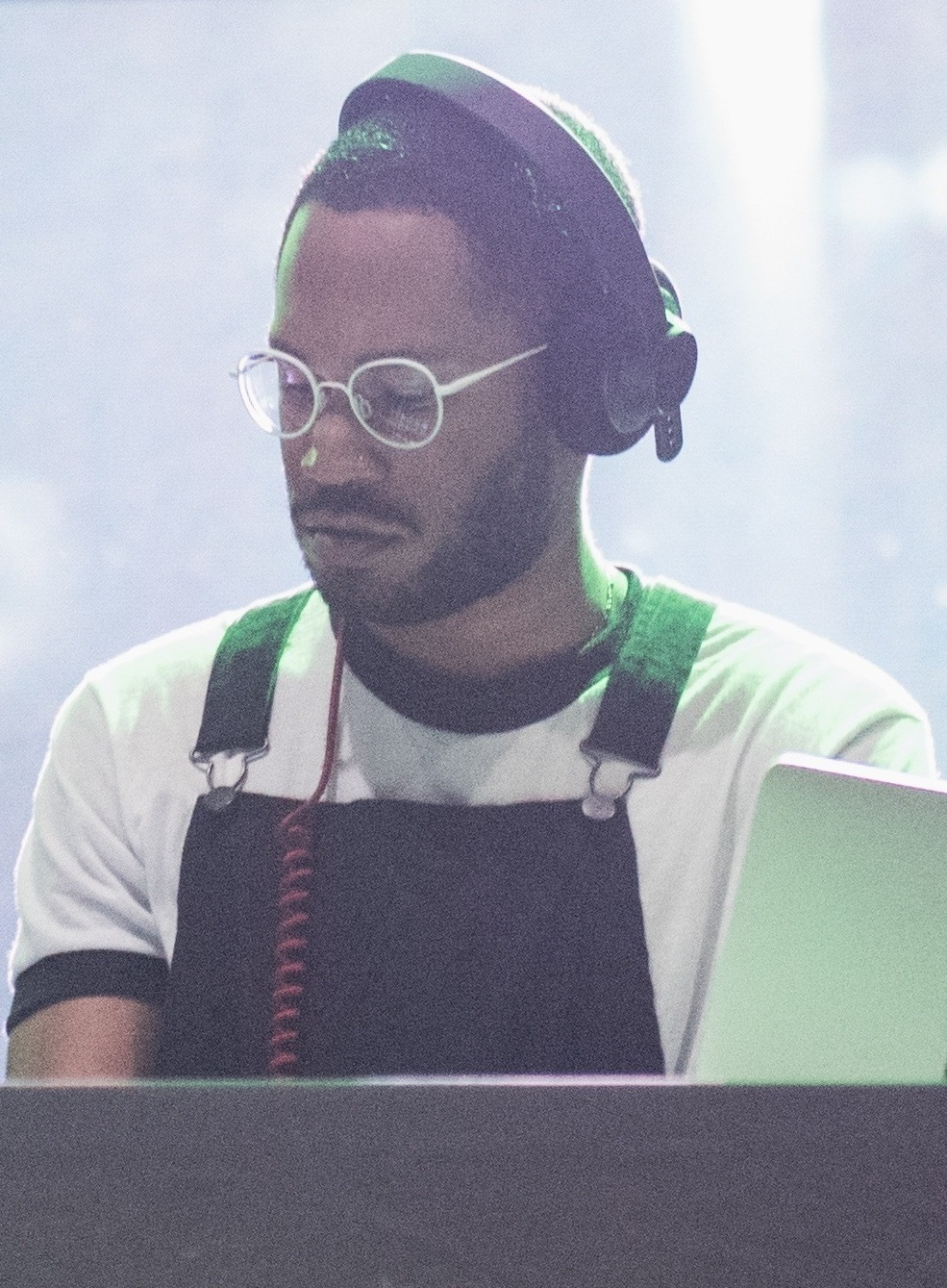
- Kaytranada in 2016

Background information
- Also known as: Kaytra; Kaytradamus
- Born: Louis Kevin Celestin; August 25, 1992 (age 34); Port-au-Prince, Haiti
- Origin: Montreal, Quebec, Canada
- Genres: Electronic; hip hop; R&B; dance; funk; house
- Occupations: DJ; record producer; singer; songwriter; rapper
- Works: Albums; production
- Years active: 2010–present
- Labels: HW&W; Jakarta; XL; RCA
- Member of: The Celestics
- Website: kaytranada.com

Louis Kevin Celestin (born August 25, 1992), known professionally as Kaytranada (stylized in all uppercase, sometimes shortened as KAYTRA), is a Haitian-Canadian music producer, and DJ. Celestin rose to prominence after releasing a series of mixtapes, remixes, and original music projects beginning in 2010 under the alias Kaytradamus. By 2013, and under the moniker Kaytranada, he began gaining wider recognition and, the following year, signed a deal with XL Recordings, with whom he would release his critically acclaimed debut studio album 99.9% in 2016. In 2019, he released its follow-up, Bubba, for which he won two Grammy Awards including Best Dance/Electronic Album. Celestin is one half of the hip hop duo the Celestics, along with his brother Lou Phelps.

== Early life ==
Kaytranada was born Louis Kevin Celestin on August 25, 1992, in Port-au-Prince, Haiti. Shortly after he was born, his family relocated to Saint-Hubert near Montreal where he was raised, and where he began his music career. Celestin's father was employed as a taxi driver and an estate agent, and his mother worked in healthcare. His parents divorced when he was 14. That same year, Celestin began to produce his own music after his brother Lou Phelps introduced him to FL Studio. The first song he ever sampled was Earth Wind & Fire's September, at 15 years old. Celestin ended up dropping out of high school to pursue music full-time to help support his family financially.

In an April 2016 article with The Fader, Celestin disclosed that he was gay and discussed his anxiety about coming out to his family. In the same interview, he shared his hopes of avoiding being defined by his sexuality as he's seen peers be labeled in the industry. Later in May of that same year, during an interview with The Guardian, he further opened up about mental health struggles brought on by his sexuality, which he said contributed to an identity crisis.

== Career ==
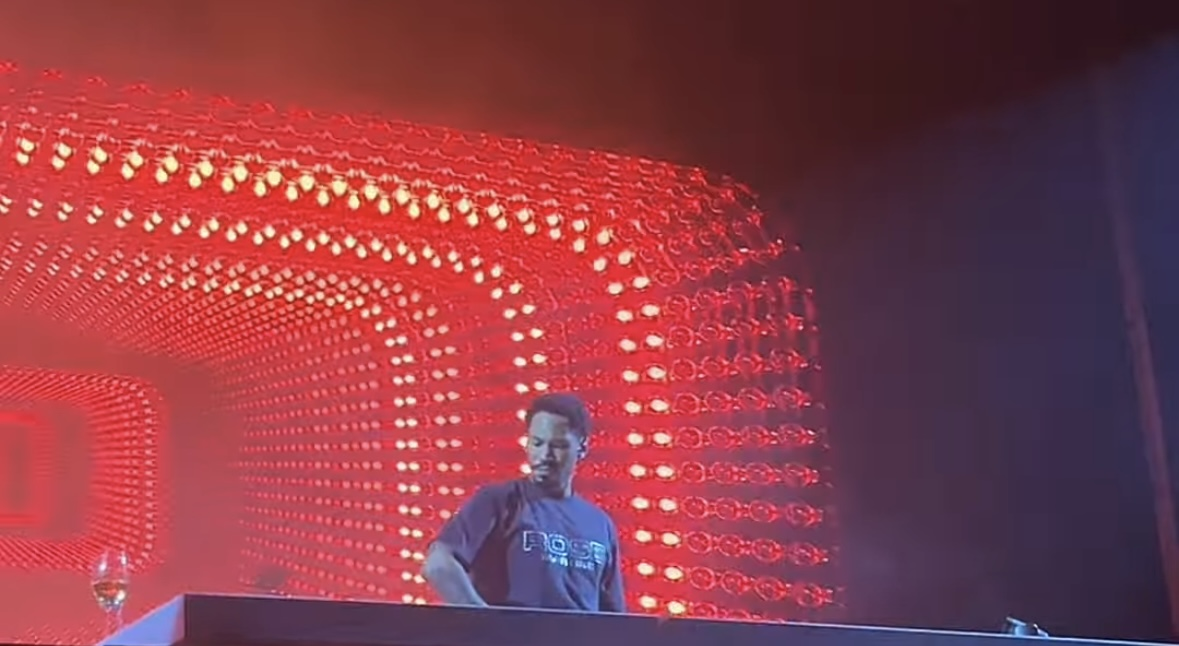
Kaytranada performing at Outernet London in 2025

Celestin began his career under the name Kaytradamus in 2010. He released two projects as Kaytradamus before changing his name to Kaytranada in 2012. In 2013, Celestin became an overnight hit on SoundCloud for his rework of "If" by Janet Jackson. Celestin was on the roster of HW&W Recordings, an independent label based in Los Angeles and Toronto. Celestin has released 13 projects and 41 remixes. He has toured more than 50 Canadian, American, European and Australian cities.

In December 2014, he signed an exclusive recording agreement with XL Recordings. During 2015, Celestin opened for two nights of Madonna's Rebel Heart Tour, one in Canada and one in the United States. Speculation arose that Celestin and producer Rick Rubin had started working together when a photo of them surfaced online around February 2015. It was later confirmed that they had formed a partnership backed by Pulse Recordings.

His debut album, 99.9%, was released on May 6, 2016. The album includes features from GoldLink, AlunaGeorge, Syd, Anderson .Paak, and Vic Mensa, among others. He also collaborated with Craig David on the song "Got It Good", which is on David's sixth studio album, Following My Intuition. Celestin won the 2016 Polaris Music Prize for his album 99.9%. The album received a score of 8.0 from Pitchfork.

On December 13, 2019, his second album, Bubba, was released on RCA Records. It received a score of 8.1 from Pitchfork.

On March 14, 2021, Celestin won a Grammy for Best Dance Recording for "10%" and Best Dance/Electronic Album for Bubba.

On April 7, 2023, Celestin and Aminé released "4eva" featuring Pharrell Williams, the first single from their joint album. The duo released a joint studio album, Kaytraminé, on May 19, 2023. The album includes guest verses from Pharrell Williams, Freddie Gibbs, Big Sean, Amaarae, and Snoop Dogg.

Celestin performed at the 22nd Coachella Valley Music and Arts Festival in April 2023.

In May 2024, Celestin announced that his third solo album, Timeless, would release on June 7, 2024. Collaborators on the album include Childish Gambino, PinkPantheress, Don Toliver, and Ravyn Lenae, among others.

On August 11, 2025 Celestin announced that his fourth studio album, Ain't No Damn Way!, would be released days later on August 15, 2025. On the next day, he released the first single "Space Invader" which samples Latrelle feat. Kelis' My Life.

== Personal life ==
Being a vocal member of the gay community, Celestin became the first Black producer and the first openly gay artist to win the award for Best Dance/Electronic Album at the Grammy Awards in 2021 for his work on his sophomore album, Bubba. Celestin discussed this in a 2021 interview with Billboard, before the event, "A lot of young kids who aspire to be musicians probably have the same inner struggles as me, being Black and gay just [trying to] fit in". Coming out in 2016, Celestin spoke about being gay and not fitting into stereotypical conceptions of a gay person, stating: "That's what I dealt with coming up. I was like, Yeah, I'm gay. But am I really gay? 'Cause I don't have the culture down. I'm not like, 'Yes, queen!' and stuff like that. So that was really hard to deal with." He has also spoken about the pressure he felt in relation to his lack of knowledge of LGBTQ history, his interracial relationship, and social media.

== Discography ==
=== Studio albums ===
- 99.9% (2016)
- Bubba (2019)
- Kaytraminé (2023; with Aminé)
- Timeless (2024)
- Ain't No Damn Way! (2025)

== Awards and nominations ==
Year	Awards	Category	Nominated work	Result
2015	SOCAN Awards	Electronic Music Award	Kaytranada	Won
2016	Rober Awards Music Prize	Best Electronica	Kaytranada	Won
2016	Rober Awards Music Prize	Breakthrough Artist	Kaytranada	Nominated
2016	Rober Awards Music Prize	Floorfiller of the Year	"Lite Spots"	Nominated
2016	iHeartRadio Much Music Video Awards	Best Post Production	"Lite Spots"	Nominated
2016	AIM Independent Music Awards	Independent Video of the Year	"Lite Spots"	Nominated
2016	Polaris Music Prize	Canadian Album of the Year	99.9%	Won
2016	Abilu Music Awards	International Electronic Album of the Year	99.9%	Won
2017	Juno Awards	Breakthrough Artist of the Year	Kaytranada	Nominated
2017	Juno Awards	Electronic Album of the Year	99.9%	Won
2017	Juno Awards	Video of the Year	"Lite Spots"	Nominated
2017	Canadian Independent Music Awards	Album of the Year	99.9%	Nominated
2017	Canadian Independent Music Awards	Artist of the Year	Kaytranada	Won
2017	iHeartRadio Much Music Video Awards	Video of the Year	"Glowed Up" (ft. Anderson .Paak)	Nominated
2017	SOCAN Songwriting Prize		"Glowed Up" (ft. Anderson .Paak)	Nominated
2019	SOCAN Songwriting Prize		"Chances" (ft. Shay Lia)	Nominated
2020	Polaris Music Prize	Canadian Album of the Year	Bubba	Shortlisted
2021	Grammy Awards	Best New Artist	Kaytranada	Nominated
2021	Grammy Awards	Best Dance Recording	"10%" (ft. Kali Uchis)	Won
2021	Grammy Awards	Best Dance/Electronic Album	Bubba	Won
2021	Juno Awards	Best Dance Recording	Bubba	Won
2021	Juno Awards	Producer of the Year	Kaytranada	Nominated
2022	Grammy Awards	Album of the Year	Back of My Mind (as featured artist)	Nominated
2022	Juno Awards	Producer of the Year	Kaytranada	Nominated
2022	Juno Awards	Best Dance Recording	"Caution"	Won
2023	Grammy Awards	Best Dance/Electronic Recording	"Intimidated" (with H.E.R.)	Nominated
2023	Juno Awards	Rap Single of the Year	"Twin Flame" (with Anderson .Paak)	Won
2023	Juno Awards	Producer of the Year	Kaytranada	Nominated
2023	BET Hip Hop Awards	DJ of the Year	Kaytranada	Nominated
2023	BET Hip Hop Awards	Producer of the Year	Kaytranada	Nominated
2024	BET Hip Hop Awards	DJ of the Year	Kaytranada	Nominated
2025	Grammy Awards	Best Dance/Electronic Recording	"Witchy" (featuring Childish Gambino)	Nominated
2025	Grammy Awards	Best Dance/Electronic Album	Timeless	Nominated
2025	Grammy Awards	Best Remixed Recording, Non-Classical	"Alter Ego (Kaytranada remix)" (Doechii featuring JT)	Nominated
2026	Grammy Awards	Best Dance/Electronic Recording	"Space Invader"	Nominated
2026	Grammy Awards	Best Remixed Recording, Non-Classical	"Don't Forget About Us (Kaytranada Remix)" (Mariah Carey)	Nominated
2026	Polaris Music Prize	Album	Ain't No Damn Way!	Longlisted
