= 99.9% =

Studio album by Kaytranada
- Released: May 6, 2016
- Recorded: 2014–2016
- Genres: Electronic; hip hop; alternative R&B
- Length: 59:08
- Labels: XL Recordings; HW&W
- Producer: Kaytranada

Kaytranada chronology
99.9% (2016)	Bubba (2019)

Alternative cover
- Canadian cover

Singles from 99.9%
- 1. "Leave Me Alone" Released: August 12, 2014; 2. "Drive Me Crazy" Released: January 27, 2015; 3. "Bus Ride" Released: March 17, 2016; 4. "Glowed Up" Released: April 7, 2016; 5. "Lite Spots" Released: May 10, 2016; 6. "You're the One" Released: 27 September 2016

99.9% is the debut studio album by Canadian electronic music producer Kaytranada, released May 6, 2016, through XL Recordings worldwide and Ultra Records in Canada. The 15-track album features guest contributions from by Anderson .Paak, Vic Mensa, Little Dragon, Syd, Craig David, AlunaGeorge, and BadBadNotGood amongst others. 99.9% was supported by five singles: "Leave Me Alone" featuring Shay Lia, "Drive Me Crazy" featuring Vic Mensa, the Karriem Riggins and River Tiber-assisted instrumental "Bus Ride", "Glowed Up" featuring Anderson .Paak, and "Lite Spots".

The album was named as the winner of the 2016 Polaris Music Prize, and won Electronic Album of the Year at the 2017 Juno Awards.

== Background and promotion ==
In May 2014, it was announced that Kaytranada had signed a deal with UK-based independent record label XL Recordings and planned to release an EP in the summer. During an interview with New York-based music magazine The Fader, the Montreal producer disclosed that XL is "one of the labels I always wanted to be on [...] It's a good label for people who are sort of lost and are like, 'Let me see what's going on.'" Kaytranada described the untitled EP as "abstract-feeling" and "uptempo, neo-soul," and was aiming to "make it as funky as possible". In addition, he confirmed that he had worked with Vic Mensa, Karriem Riggins, Reva DeVito, and Shay Lia amongst others.

On August 12, 2014, at the announcement of the EP's tentative title, So Bad, a song named "Leave Me Alone", featuring vocalist and fellow Montreal native Shay Lia, was released as the lead single. However, no updates had been provided regarding the EP's release date.

As reported on December 15, 2014, Kaytranada expanded his project into a full-length album. On Facebook, he posted a glimpse of his renewed contract with XL, along with the words "ALBUM COMING." Serving as the second single is the trap-influenced "Drive Me Crazy", featuring Chicago rapper Vic Mensa, released on January 27, 2015.

On September 7, 2015, Kaytranada took to Twitter to announce the album's official title: 99.9%. During Benji B's "Montreal Special" on BBC Radio 1 on March 16, 2016, he shared more details about his long-awaited effort. The producer expounded on the album title, explaining that it reflects his dissatisfaction and indecisiveness when it comes to his musical endeavor. Furthermore, he confirmed that Canadian instrumental band BadBadNotGood and The Internet's lead vocalist Syd were both recruited as guests contributors. Speaking about BadBadNotGood, he revealed that they recorded about fifteen tracks together, though only two were selected for the album. He also premiered a track from the album titled "Bus Ride" which features drum work from Detroit jazz percussionist and producer Karriem Riggins, and accompaniment from Toronto multi-instrumentalist and producer River Tiber. On Twitter, he confirmed that the album would be released on May 6.

The following day, Kaytranada unveiled via Instagram and Facebook the artworks and track listing for 99.9%, along with short individual animations corresponding to each track. The album's digital version was made available for pre-order ahead of its release on iTunes and Amazon, while its physical format could be pre-ordered on XL Recordings' online store. The physical product comes on a double 12-inch vinyl with a gatefold sleeve, and includes a free CD of the digital album.

On April 7, 2016, "Glowed Up", which features Anderson .Paak on vocals, debuted on Annie Mac's BBC Radio 1 show, with the music video, directed by Bo Mirosseni, premiering soon after. Marc Hogan from Pitchfork gave the song a "Best New Track" designation, stating that "It's a track where two complementary artists sound like they are right where they want to be, and the pleasure is in how they bring us into this world, too".

In anticipation of the album's release, an album-themed video game, 99.9%: The Game, was launched on Kaytranada's website on April 20, 2016. Designed by artist Ricardo Cavolo, who also worked on the album's artwork, the game is a side-scroller modeled after 2013's popular mobile game Flappy Bird. Players must navigate an airplane through obstacles while collecting items to earn points. Players who attain a high score of over a hundred points will be rewarded with a free download of "Nobody Beats the Kay," a bonus track from the album. On May 10, 2016, a music video for "Lite Spots" was released.

== Reception ==
Professional ratings
Aggregate scores
Source	Rating
AnyDecentMusic?	7.4/10
Metacritic	81/100
Review scores
Source	Rating
AllMusic	4.5/5 stars
Financial Times	4/5 stars
The Irish Times	4/5 stars
Mixmag	9/10
The Observer	3/5 stars
Pitchfork	8.0/10
Q	4/5 stars
Record Collector	5/5 stars
Spin	8/10
XLR8R	8/10

99.9% received critical acclaim upon its release. At Metacritic, which assigns a normalized score out of 100 to all reviews from mainstream publications, the album received an average score of 81, based on a number of 21 reviews, indicating "universal acclaim". Both Pitchfork and Spin gave the album a rating of 8 out of 10. Pitchfork's Jonah Bromwich wrote, "The genre-defying stew of funk, soul, R&B, and beat and dance music that Kaytranada has cooked up on 99.9% nods back at that heritage of percussion-driven synthesis." At PopMatters, which gives a rating out of ten stars, the album received an average rating of 6 stars. In his review, Chris Conaton wrote, "Even though [Kaytranada] doesn't do every genre he attempts equally skillfully, there's a pop music core to most of these songs that keeps 99.9% listenable throughout."

Kaytranada has won the 2016 Polaris Music Prize for the album.

=== Accolades ===
Publication	Accolade	Year	Rank	Ref.
The Guardian	The Best Albums of 2016	2016	36	
The Independent	Best Albums of 2016	2016	16	
NME	NME's Albums of the Year 2016	2016	5	
Rough Trade	Albums of the Year	2016	76	
The Skinny	Top 50 Albums of 2016	2016	25	
Stereogum	The 50 Best Albums of 2016	2016	36	
Apple Music	Best Albums of 2016 (Canada)	2016	1	
Pitchfork	Best Albums of 2016	2016	25	

== Track listing ==
All tracks produced by Kaytranada, except "Bus Ride" by Kaytranada, Karriem Riggins and River Tiber, and "Weight Off" by Kaytranada and BadBadNotGood.

99.9% track listing
No.	Title	Writer(s)	Length
1.	"Track Uno"	Kevin Celestin	5:44
2.	"Bus Ride" (featuring Karriem Riggins and River Tiber)	Celestin; Karriem Riggins; Tommy Paxton-Beesley	2:13
3.	"Got It Good" (featuring Craig David)	Celestin; Craig David; Tre Jean-Marie; Lauren K. Faith	3:48
4.	"Together" (featuring AlunaGeorge and GoldLink)	Celestin; Aluna Francis; D'Anthony Carlos	3:17
5.	"Drive Me Crazy" (featuring Vic Mensa)	Celestin; Victor Mensah	4:37
6.	"Weight Off" (featuring BadBadNotGood)	Celestin; Alexander Sowinski; Chester Hansen; Matthew Tavares; Leland Whitty	2:35
7.	"One Too Many" (featuring Phonte)	Celestin; Phonte Coleman	3:38
8.	"Despite the Weather"	Celestin	2:01
9.	"Glowed Up" (featuring Anderson .Paak)	Celestin; Brandon Paak Anderson	4:58
10.	"Breakdance Lesson N.1"	Celestin	4:28
11.	"You're the One" (featuring Syd)	Celestin; Sydney Bennett; Nicholas Eaholtz	3:47
12.	"Vivid Dreams" (featuring River Tiber)	Celestin; Paxton-Beesley	4:36
13.	"Lite Spots"	Celestin	3:50
14.	"Leave Me Alone" (featuring Shay Lia)	Celestin; Shay Lia	4:37
15.	"Bullets" (featuring Little Dragon)	Celestin; Yukimi Nagano; Erik Bodin; Håkan Wirenstrand; Fredrik Wallin; Sowinski; Hansen; Tavares; Whitty	4:59
Total length:			59:08

Kaytranada.com bonus track
No.	Title	Writer(s)	Length
16.	"Nobody Beats the Kay"	Celestin	2:03
Total length:			61:11

Notes

- "Track Uno" contains a sample of "I Figure I'm Out of Your Life" by Delegation, written by Kenneth Gold and Michael Denne.
- "Bus Ride" contains a sample of "По садочку хожу", written by Валерий Колесников, Вячеслав Новиков, Владимир Молотков and Александр Христидис.
- "Got It Good" contains a sample of "Olho de Vidro" by Jaime & Nair, written by Jaime Alem.
- "Drive Me Crazy" contains a sample of "Bermuda Triangle", written by Alan Hawkshaw.
- "Despite the Weather" contains excerpts from "Camouflage" written by Bob Selvin.
- "Glowed Up" contains a sample of "Raindrops" by Bobby Heath, Eric Peters and Robert Hunter.
- "Breakdance Lesson N.1" features samples from the Attitude recording "Love Me Tonight", written by David Frank Michael Murphy.
- "Lite Spots" contains a sample of "Pontos De Luz" performed by Gal Costa, and written by Jards Macalé and Waly Salomão.

== Charts ==
=== Weekly charts ===
2016 chart performance for 99.9%
Chart (2016)	Peak position
Australian Albums (ARIA)	21
Belgian Albums (Ultratop Flanders)	38
Belgian Albums (Ultratop Wallonia)	106
Canadian Albums (Billboard)	24
Dutch Albums (Album Top 100)	29
French Albums (SNEP)	81
German Albums (Offizielle Top 100)	94
Irish Albums (IRMA)	83
New Zealand Albums (RMNZ)	31
Swiss Albums (Schweizer Hitparade)	54
UK Albums (Official Charts)	31
US Billboard 200	73
US Top Dance Albums (Billboard)	2

2023 chart performance for 99.9%
Chart (2023)	Peak position
German Albums (Offizielle Top 100)	49

=== Year-end charts ===
Year-end chart performance for 99.9%
Chart (2016)	Position
US Top Dance/Electronic Albums (Billboard)	11

== Certifications ==
Certifications for 99.9%
Region	Certification	Certified units/sales
Denmark (IFPI Danmark)	Gold	10,000^{‡}
New Zealand (RMNZ)	Platinum	15,000^{‡}
United Kingdom (BPI)	Silver	60,000^{‡}
^{‡} Sales+streaming figures based on certification alone.
