= Lou Phelps =

Haitian-Canadian rapper and producer (born 1994)

- Also known as: Louie P.
- Born: Louis-Philippe Celestin; August 30, 1994 (age 31)
- Origin: Saint-Hubert, Quebec
- Genres: Hip hop
- Occupations: Rapper; Record producer
- Years active: 2011–present
- Labels: HW&W

Louis-Philippe Celestin (born August 30, 1994), better known by his stage name Lou Phelps, is a Haitian-Canadian rapper and producer from Saint-Hubert, Quebec. He is a member of the Canadian hip hop duo The Celestics alongside his brother Kaytranada.

== Career ==
=== 2011–2014: Early career ===
Lou Phelps began his career as Louie P. with The Celestics. They released their debut project titled Massively Massive in 2011.

=== 2014–present: Supreme Laziness and 001: Experiments ===
In 2014, Lou Phelps, along with Kaytranada, released a project titled Supreme Laziness under the moniker The Celestics.

On April 20, 2017, Lou Phelps released his debut project titled 001: Experiments. The project was produced entirely by Kaytranada. The project featured guest appearances by Bishop Nehru, Innanet James and Kallitechnis.

In 2025, Lou Phelps released his debut album, Chèlbè, again produced by Kaytranada. The 11 track album includes the lead single, "WHAT NOW", and also features songs with GoldLink and Nono Black.

== Influences ==
Lou Phelps's influences include Andre 3000, Kendrick Lamar, Kanye West, Anderson .Paak and Madlib.

== Discography ==
=== Solo ===
- 001: Experiments (2017)
- 002: Love Me (2018)
- 003: Extra Extra (2020)
- Touché (2022)
- Chèlbè (2025)

=== Collaborations ===
- Massively Massive (with Kaytranada as The Celestics) (2011)
- Supreme Laziness (with Kaytranada as The Celestics) (2014)
