= Wild & Free (band) =

American band

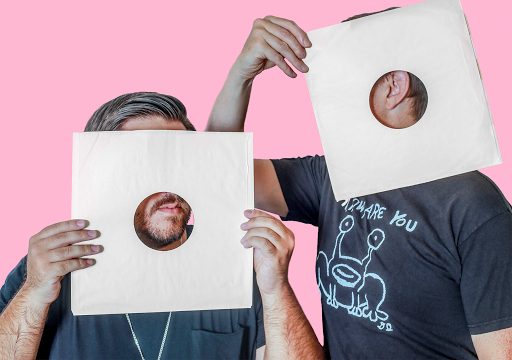
- Wild & Free (2017)

Background information
- Origin: Los Angeles, California, United States
- Genres: Dance, daytime disco, chillwave
- Years active: 2015-present
- Label: RIS Labs
- Members: Drew Kramer; George Cochrane
- Website: Official website

Wild & Free is an American, Los Angeles based duo composed of producers, vocalists, and multi-instrumentalists, Drew Kramer and George Cochrane. They produce songs in the electronic dance music, disco, chillwave, and related genres. Their first single "Tropique" was released in 2015, and Spin Magazine described it as filled with "fat bass lines, tropical-tinged percussion and universally agreeable party sentiments." In 2015, their music was licensed for use on The CW series, The Vampire Diaries.

In 2016, they opened for indietronica stars Classixx at Mixmag's "The Lab Los Angeles." Their first EP, titled "Low Pressure" was also released that year on the RISLabs label. Also in 2016, their music appeared on the MTV reality show The Real World.

Wild & Free has also produced remixes for artists including Gigamesh, Ben Browning of Cut Copy, Karl Kling of RAC, and David Marston of Soul Clap Records. Their production work includes co-producer credits on "Can't Stop Your Lovin'" by Poolside, which charted on Billboard in 2019. The track was also featured on season four of the Netflix series 13 Reasons Why.

In 2018, they took part in a Fact magazine "Against The Clock" challenge in which they "...made a sun-drenched disco jam in just 10 minutes with the aid of a sampler, vintage synths and a bass guitar."

== Discography ==
=== Singles ===
- "Life On Jupiter" / Rock It Science Laboratories (July 29, 2016)
- "Moment" / Noon Pacific (April 3, 2017)
- "Ferns and Stuff" / Discotexas (November 3, 2017)
- "Do U Ever Get Down?" / Kitsuné (February 26, 2018)
- "Never Let Me Down" / Los Angelearic (July 31, 2020)

=== EPs ===
- "Low Pressure" EP / Rock It Science Laboratories (May 22, 2015)
- "The Moonhowler" EP / Rock It Science Laboratories (November 13, 2015)
- "Low Pressure Remixed" EP / Rock It Science Laboratories (September 11, 2015)
- "Ferns and Stuff (The Remixes)" EP / Discotexas (June 22, 2018) (featuring remixes from Justin Strauss of Milk 'N' Cookies, DJ Fame and Bryan Mette, Xinobi, and Boys Get Hurt)

=== LPs ===
- Shapes On Shapes / Discotexas (November 17, 2017)

=== Remixes/Edits ===
- Panama - "I Watched You Slip (Wild & Free Remix)" / Future Classic (September 5, 2017)
- Ben Browning - "Friends Of Mine (Wild & Free Remix)" / Yellow Year Records (2015)
- Gigamesh - "All Night (Wild & Free Remix)" / Hyperreal Records (December 9, 2016)
- David Marston - "Sometimes It's Hard ft. Brigitte Zozula (Wild & Free Remix)" / Soul Clap Records (January 27, 2017)
- Karl Kling - "How The West Was Won (Wild & Free Remix)" / Mani / Pedi Records (October 28, 2016)
- Joe Goddard - "Truth is Light (Wild & Free Remix)" / Domino Records (November 9, 2017)
- Xinobi - "Morning Fix (Wild & Free Remix)" / Discotexas (July 6, 2018)
- Poolside - "Which Way To Paradise (Wild & Free Remix)" / Poolside Records (August 30, 2018)
- Moullinex - "Say It Slow feat. Georgia Anne Muldrow (Wild & Free Remix)" / Discotexas (October 12, 2018)

=== Music videos ===
- "Trippin On You" / Complex UK (July 18, 2018)

=== Collaborations ===
- Falqo ft. Wild & Free - "Someday" / Surfin Wavs (May 18, 2016)
- Falcon Punch - "Higher feat. Wild & Free" / Noon Pacific (August 15, 2016)

=== Appears on compilations ===
- Miami Poolside 2015 / Toolroom Records (March 23, 2015)
- Noon Pacific 001 Vinyl Compilation / Noon Pacific (2016)
- Vinyl Moon Volume 004: Surface Tension / (December 2015)
- Late Summer Compilation Volume 6 / La.Ga.Sta (September 30, 2016)
