= Classixx =

American production and DJ duo

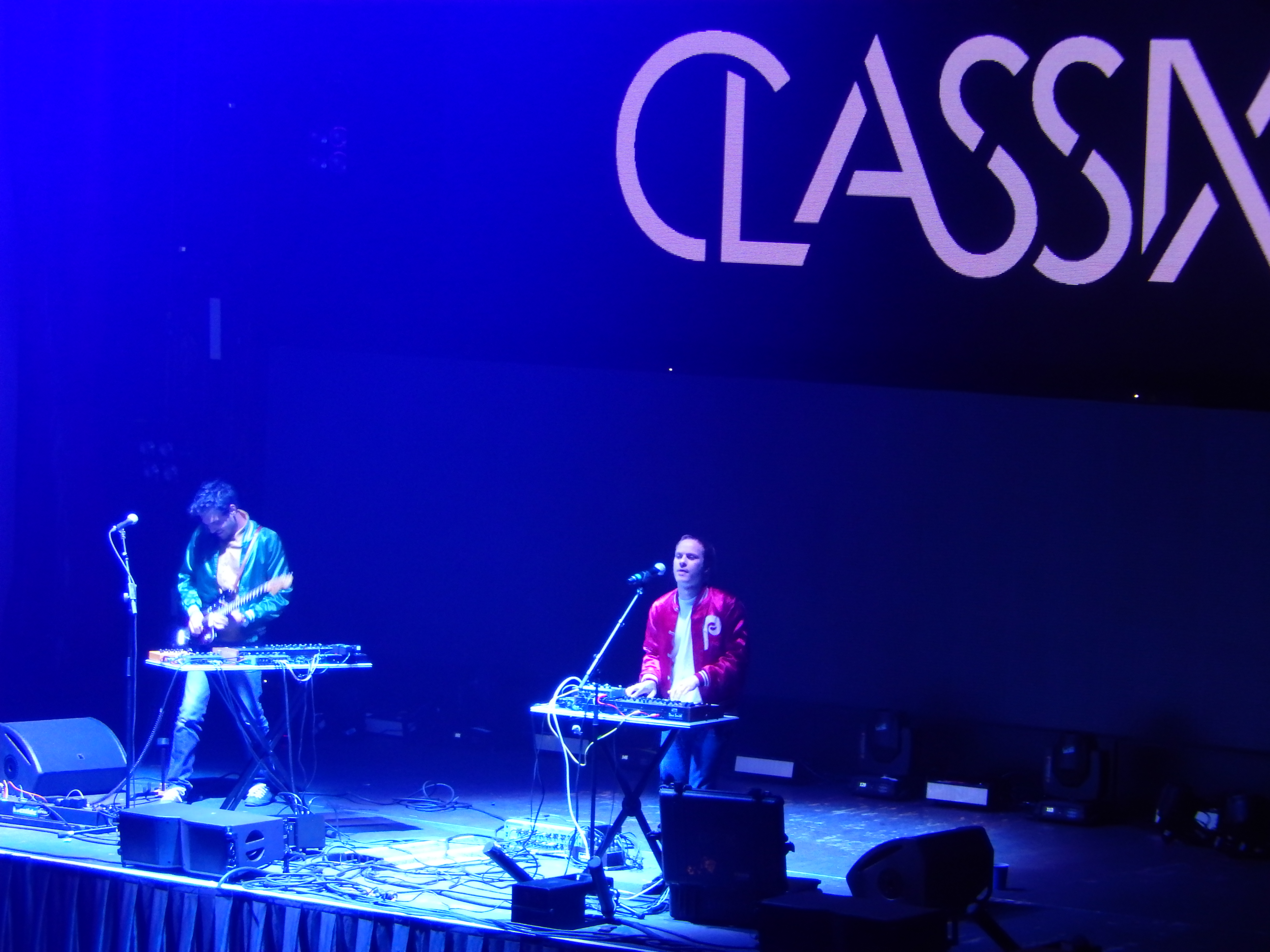
- Classixx performing in 2013

Background information
- Origin: Los Angeles, California, United States
- Genres: Electronic; electropop; indietronica; nu-disco; deep house
- Years active: 2008–present
- Labels: Kitsuné, Innovative Leisure, Future Classic
- Members: Michael David; Tyler Blake
- Website: classixx.la

Classixx is an American electronic music record production and DJ duo, based in Los Angeles, composed of Michael David and Tyler Blake.

== History ==
Tyler Blake and Michael David, childhood friends, started a DJ duo in the suburbs of Los Angeles. The name Classixx came from their liking of classic compilations of different music. The DJ duo is influenced by a plethora of music, ranging from old school R&B to Paul Simon to Kraftwerk.

The duo currently reside in the greater Los Angeles metropolitan area. Michael David married Katie Gravette in 2011. David and Blake are childhood friends and attended the same middle school and high school together.

== Career ==
David spent the first half of the 2000s releasing his own music and touring in a band as a guitar player while Blake attended the Berklee School of Music. In 2005, David left his previous band and Blake dropped out of music school. Soon after, Classixx was formed. In their early twenties, Classixx were part of the new wave of the Los Angeles electronic music. A change from the banger-driven electro that had been dominating dance floors, their sound was a smooth blend of disco, new wave, funk, house, and indie rock. Recent remixes for groundbreaking and diverse artists include Phoenix, Mayer Hawthorne, Holy Ghost, Ladyhawke, Fischerspooner, Groove Armada, Yacht, Beni, Drop the Lime and Major Lazer. According to Chicagoist, Classixx "became staples in DJ sets all over the world".

Pitchfork Media wrote that the duo gave Phoenix's "Lisztomania" "a gorgeously pillowy synth-disco framework". The Los Angeles Times called it "pure disco cotton candy".

Classixx's debut single, "I'll Get You" featuring Jeppe (Junior Senior), was released in the summer of 2009 on Paris based Kitsune Records.

Classixx's first album, Hanging Gardens, was released on May 14, 2013 via Innovative Leisure.

Classixx announced their second album Faraway Reach via Instagram on February 17, 2016. The album features guest appearances by Passion Pit, T-Pain, De Lux, Alex Frankel, How to Dress Well, Nonku, Harriet Brown, Isles and Panama and was released on June 3, 2016.

In 2017, they worked with Panama on his EP 'Hope for Something'.

== Discography ==
Studio albums

- Hanging Gardens (Innovative Leisure · 2013)
- Faraway Reach (Innovative Leisure · 2016)

Singles

- "Cold Act Ill" (In Stereo · 2008)
- "I'll Get You (feat. Jeppe)" (Kitsune Records · 2009)
- "Into the Valley" featuring Karl Dixon (Green Label Sound · 2011)
- "Holding On" (Innovative Leisure · 2013)
- "All You're Waiting For" featuring Nancy Whang (Innovative Leisure · 2013)
- "Santa Domino" (Innovative Leisure · 2013)
- "A Stranger Love" (Innovative Leisure · 2014)
- "Whatever I Want" featuring T-Pain (Innovative Leisure · 2015)
- "Just Let Go" featuring How To Dress Well (Innovative Leisure · 2016)
- "Safe Inside" featuring Passion Pit (Innovative Leisure · 2016)
- "I Feel Numb" featuring Alex Frankel (Innovative Leisure · 2016)
- "Possessive" (Innovative Leisure · 2017)
- "Love Me No More" (Innovative Leisure · 2019)
- "What's Wrong With That? (Silly Love Songs Rework)" (Innovative Leisure · 2020)
- "One More Song" featuring Roosevelt (Innovative Leisure · 2020)
- "Francesca"/"Weekends" (collaboration with Local Natives) (Innovative Leisure · 2020)
- "Big Rhythm" (Potion Records · 2021)
- "Get Myself Together" (Classixx · 2024)
- "Higher" with Panama (Classixx · 2024)

Original production

- Mayer Hawthorne - "No Strings" (Produced by Classixx) (Stones Throw Records · 2010)

Remixes

- 2009: "Lisztomania" by Phoenix
- 2009: "Starts With One" by Shiny Toy Guns
- 2009: "My Love Sees You" by Beni
- 2009: "I Will Come Back" by Holy Ghost!
- 2009: "Riddle of Steel" by Guns N' Bombs
- 2009: "Green Eyed Love" by Mayer Hawthorne
- 2009: "Cash Flow" by Major Lazer
- 2009: "We Are Electric" by Fischerspooner
- 2010: "Psychic City" by Yacht
- 2010: "Devil's Eyes" by Drop The Lime
- 2010: "Paper Romance" by Groove Armada
- 2010: "When Your Love Is Safe" by Active Child
- 2011: "Reginald's Groove" by Cosmic Kids
- 2011: "Buzzin'" by Shwayze
- 2011: "Blue Velvet" by Lana Del Rey
- 2011: "Lucky Star" by Madonna
- 2012: "Take a Walk" by Passion Pit
- 2012: "Move in the Right Direction" by Gossip
- 2012: "Am I Real?" by Nite Jewel
- 2013: "You Can't Run From My Love" by Munk & Peaches
- 2013: "Is This How You Feel?" by The Preatures
- 2013: "Penny" by Hanni El Khatib
- 2014: "Always" by Panama
- 2014: "Sundream" by Rüfüs Du Sol
- 2015: "The Pleasure Principle by Janet Jackson
- 2017: "Dark Days" by Local Natives
- 2017: "Undertow" by Panama (with Turbotito)
- 2017: "Rise and Fall" by Night Drive
- 2018: "Wolves Still Cry" by Lawrence Rothman
- 2021: "Good Old Days" by JR JR
- 2022: "Boom Boom" by Terri Gold
- 2024: "Weak in Your Light" by Nation of Language
