= Bass Drum of Death (album) =

Studio album by Bass Drum of Death
- Released: June 25, 2013
- Genres: Garage rock, noise rock
- Length: 34:37
- Label: Innovative Leisure

Bass Drum of Death chronology
GB City (2011)	Bass Drum of Death (2013)	Rip This (2014)

Singles from Bass Drum of Death
- 1. "Shattered Me" Released: April 16, 2013; 2. "Bad Reputation" Released: September 17, 2013

Professional ratings
Aggregate scores
Source	Rating
Metacritic	71/100
Review scores
Source	Rating
Allmusic	4/5 stars
MusicOMH	3.5/5 stars
Pitchfork	5.9/10
Drowned in Sound	7/10

Bass Drum of Death is the second studio album by Bass Drum of Death. It was released in June 2013 under Innovative Leisure.

The first single from the album "Shattered Me" was released on April 16, 2013.

== Track list ==
No.	Title	Length
1.	"I Wanna Be Forgotten"	2:21
2.	"Fine Lies"	3:14
3.	"Shattered Me"	2:15
4.	"Such a Bore"	4:24
5.	"No Demons"	2:36
6.	"Bad Reputation"	3:48
7.	"Faces of the Wind"	2:02
8.	"Crawling After You"	3:49
9.	"White Fright"	2:40
10.	"Way Out"	3:22
11.	"(You'll Never Be) So Wrong"	4:05
