= Hanging Garden =

Hanging Garden, Hanging garden, or Hanging Gardens may refer to:

== Horticulture and plants ==
- Hanging garden (cultivation), a sustainable landscape architecture, an artistic garden or a small urban farm, attached to or built on a wall
- Hanging garden (habitat), a plant community of the flora of the Colorado Plateau and Canyonlands region

== Art, literature and music ==
- The Hanging Garden (film), a 1997 film by Thom Fitzgerald
- Hanging Garden (2005 film), a Japanese film
- Hanging Gardens (2022 film), a film by Ahmed Yassin Al Daradji
- The Hanging Garden (Rankin novel), a 1998 novel by Ian Rankin
  - "The Hanging Garden", TV adaptation, an episode of Rebus
- The Hanging Garden (White novel), a 2012 unfinished novel by Patrick White
- "The Hanging Garden" (song), by The Cure (1982)
- Hanging Gardens (The Necks album), a 1999 album by The Necks
- Hanging Gardens (Classixx album), a 2013 album by Classixx
- Hanging Gardens, a 1990 live album by Nico

== Places ==
- Hanging Gardens of Babylon, one of the Seven Wonders of the Ancient World
- Hanging Gardens of Mumbai, in India
- Terraces (Bahá'í), also known as the Hanging Gardens of Haifa, in Israel
