= Will the Guns Come Out =

Studio album by Hanni El Khatib
- Released: September 27, 2011
- Length: 31:34
- Label: Innovative Leisure
- Producer: Hanni El Khatib

Hanni El Khatib chronology
Will the Guns Come Out (2011)	Head in the Dirt (2013)

Singles from Will the Guns Come Out
- 1. "Dead Wrong" Released: 2010; 2. "Build. Destroy. Rebuild." Released: 2010

Will the Guns Come Out is the debut studio album by American singer-songwriter Hanni El Khatib. It was released on September 27, 2011, through Innovative Leisure. It received generally favorable reviews from critics.

== Background ==
Will the Guns Come Out was recorded in Hanni El Khatib's bedroom. It includes his cover versions of "Heartbreak Hotel" and "You Rascal You". "I Got a Thing" is included as a bonus track on the end of the album. It is a cover of Fuzzy Haskins-written "I Got a Thing, You Got a Thing, Everybody's Got a Thing", which appeared on Funkadelic's debut studio album, Funkadelic (1970). It was used on a Nike ad campaign, which received two million views on YouTube. "Dead Wrong" and "Build. Destroy. Rebuild." were released as singles from the album.

== Critical reception ==
Professional ratings
Aggregate scores
Source	Rating
Metacritic	65/100
Review scores
Source	Rating
AllMusic	3.5/5 stars
DIY	3/5 stars
Filter	79%
The Guardian	3/5 stars
Spin	7/10

According to the review aggregator Metacritic, Will the Guns Come Out received "generally favorable reviews" based on a weighted average score of 65 out of 100 from 7 critic scores.

Andrew Olshevski of CMJ commented that Hanni El Khatib "manages to brandish an impressive range of techniques from his eclectic arsenal over the course of his debut." Caroline Sullivan of The Guardian stated, "The White Stripes loom large over all this, but he brings a noirish touch of his own that renders a few tracks more than just pastiche." Camille Dodero of Spin described the album as "a fine testament to the power of pomade nostalgia, cigarette-pack-in-sleeve tropes, and Gene Vincent licks." Mary Kosearas of Filter stated, "Like a well-ordered classic, the whiskey-soaked vocals and intentionally rough instrumentals inspire a motivation that is not of the Twittering era: it speaks to the barefoot babes running through the streets, bottle in hand, fist raised." She added, "The tracks jump in range between genres, but for the most part you can find a consistent punk sound woven throughout."

=== Accolades ===
Year-end lists for Will the Guns Come Out
Publication	List	Rank	Ref.
Les Inrockuptibles	The 100 Best Albums of 2011	44	

== Track listing ==
All tracks are written by Hanni El Khatib, except where noted.

Will the Guns Come Out track listing
No.	Title	Writer(s)	Length
1.	"Will the Guns Come Out"		1:25
2.	"Build. Destroy. Rebuild."		2:58
3.	"Fuck It, You Win"		3:11
4.	"Dead Wrong"		3:28
5.	"Come Alive"		2:34
6.	"Loved One"		2:37
7.	"Heartbreak Hotel"	Mae Boren Axton; Tommy Durden; Elvis Presley	3:12
8.	"Wait Wait Wait"		3:56
9.	"Garbage City"		3:54
10.	"You Rascal You"	Sam Theard	2:21
11.	"I Got a Thing" (bonus track)	Clarence Haskins	2:00
Total length:			31:34

== Personnel ==
Credits adapted from liner notes.

- Hanni El Khatib – vocals, production, mixing
- Marc Bianchi – additional production and/or drums (1–5, 7, 9), recording (1–9)
- Greg Reeves – guitar (4), mastering
- Nicolas Fleming-Yaryan – drums (10), recording (10)
- Josh Marcy – recording (11)

== Charts ==
Chart performance for Will the Guns Come Out
Chart (2011)	Peak position
French Albums (SNEP)	111
US Heatseekers Albums (Billboard)	46
