= Gelli Haha =

American singer (born 1996)

Angel Abaya (Gelli Haha)
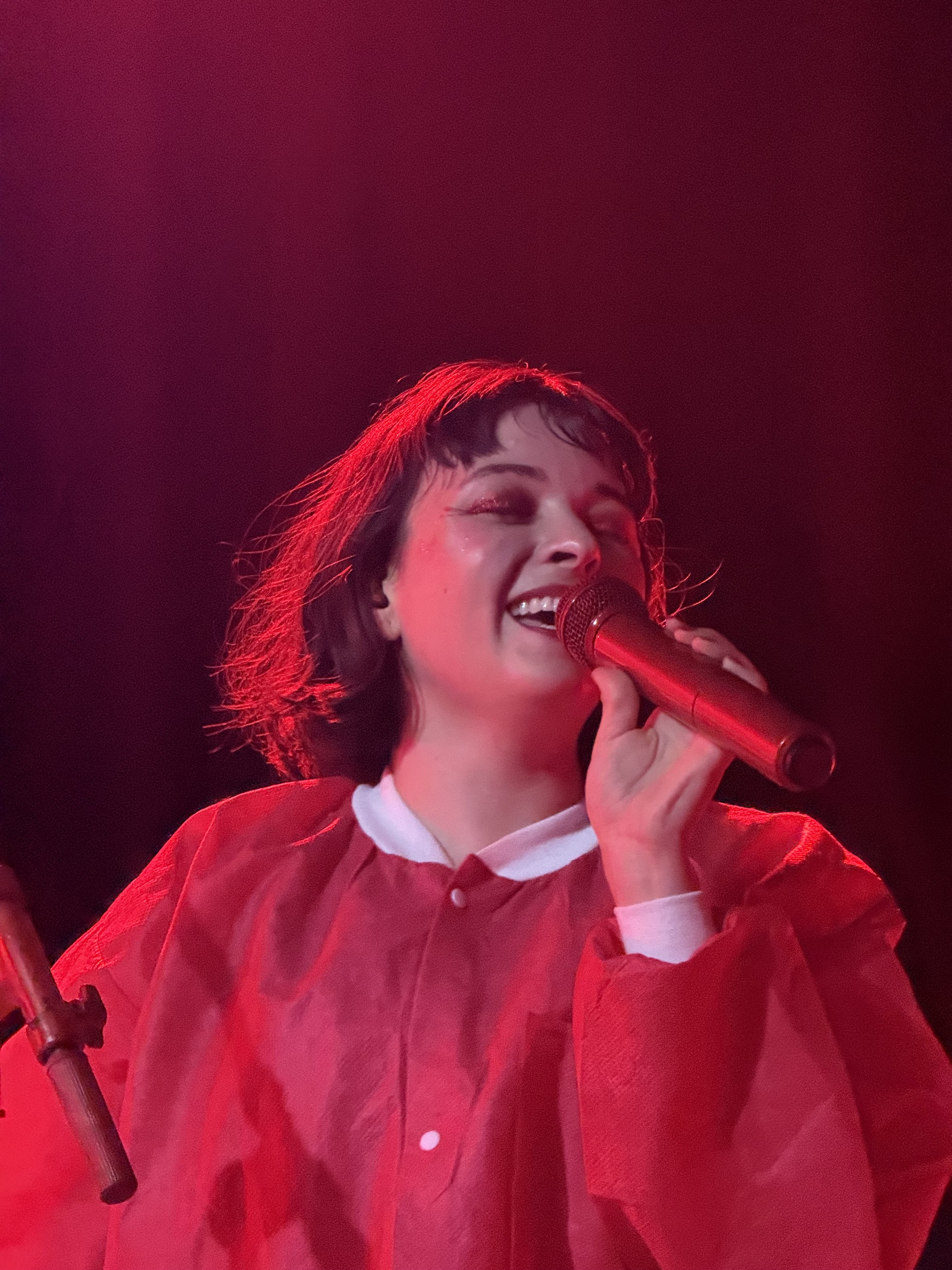
- Gelli Haha in 2026

Background information
- Also known as: Angel Abaya
- Born: September 23, 1996 (age 30); Boise, Idaho, US
- Genres: Experimental pop; indie rock
- Occupation: Singer
- Years active: 2014–present
- Labels: Earth Libraries; Innovative Leisure
- Website: gelli.world

Angel Abaya (born September 23, 1996), also known as Gelli Haha, is an American singer based in Los Angeles. As Angel Abaya, she released her first extended play, Quaranmood (2020), and her debut studio album, The Bubble (2023).

After releasing The Bubble, Abaya adopted the stage name "Gelli Haha" and released the studio album Switcheroo (2025) under the alias. Haha's aesthetic extensively utilizes the color red and is noted for its childishness and comedic nature. She received attention from major music publications due to this aesthetic.

== Early life ==
Angel Abaya was born in Boise, Idaho, on September 23, 1996. She is of Filipino descent through her father, and English and Irish descent through her mother. Her maternal grandmother is a music professor in Great Falls, Montana, and plays the pipe organ at her church. During her pre-adolescent years, Abaya began listening to jazz music, which she credits with helping her find "more self expression in [her] voice". She began playing the violin at the age of six and later the piano at the age of eight, and also partook in choir and orchestra during her childhood.

During her adolescence, she dabbled in playing the guitar, but did not become a prolific guitarist until adulthood. Abaya entered Boise's music scene at the age of eighteen and was a member in several bands, one of which spawned an invitation to collaborate with the contemporary performing arts company LED.

She eventually became the group's program director. Abaya worked in the Treefort Music Fest's communications department and as a teacher at the music education non-profit organization Boise Rock School. Her job consisted of creating blogs, communicating with media journalists, project managers and graphic designers. She also performed at the festival.

== Career ==
In 2020, after signing with Earth Libraries, Abaya released her debut extended play, Quaranmood, alongside an accompanying short film. The short film was created using funds from the COVID Cultural Commissioning Fund, a grant for Boise based artists during the COVID-19 lockdown. Following the EP's release, Abaya began working on her debut studio album, The Bubble. While she developed the album, Abaya released two standalone singles, "Sleepy Shine" and a cover of Joni Mitchell's song "River." She moved to Los Angeles in 2021, where she took on gigs as a freelance journalist.

The Bubble was released on May 5, 2023, and was preceded by the singles "Over/On/Under", "Through The Glass", "Better", and its title track. She embarked on a tour with her backing band to promote the album.

Following the album's release, Abaya began feeling "unwelcome" in her life. As a result, she developed Gelli Haha, a fictional character living in "the Gelliverse," who serves as a representation of her inner child. Abaya has described Haha as both a solo project and a project with collaborators, but also as a band consisting of her, collaborator Sean Guerin of De Lux, and backup dancers she dubbed the "Gelli Kompany". With Guerin's help, she fleshed out her vision for Haha, beginning with a pivot to center the color red in her wardrobe and aesthetics.

Over the next two years, the two worked together on what would become her second studio album and her first as Gelli Haha. Switcheroo was released on June 27, 2025 via Innovative Leisure and was preceded by the singles "Bounce House", "Funny Music", "Spit", and "Normalize". On March 25, 2026, Haha reissued the album to include a new single, "Klouds Will Carry Me To Sleep."

== Artistry ==
The music under Abaya's birth name has been labeled as psychedelic punk and indie rock by music journalists, while she herself conceptualizes it as singer-songwriter music. Each song in Quaranmood was written about a specific emotion Abaya experienced on a daily basis during the COVID-19 lockdown. The Bubble explores the concept of people putting themselves in various "bubbles," such as interpersonal relationships or identities, and the resulting psychological effects of this phenomenon. Abaya said the album stemmed from a time in her life when she felt like "an anxious people pleaser." Quaranmood primarily featured guitar-driven pop, rock, and folk music.

Abaya's work as Gelli Haha marked a shift in her music towards synthesizer-based experimental pop and electroclash releases. She attributed her work in the synthpop genre to a desire to "meet in the middle" between pop music and experimental music; to her, the former was "too boring" while the latter was "too unpalatable." Writing Switcheroo, Abaya's sonic inspirations included the band Animal Collective and singer-songwriter Kate Bush.

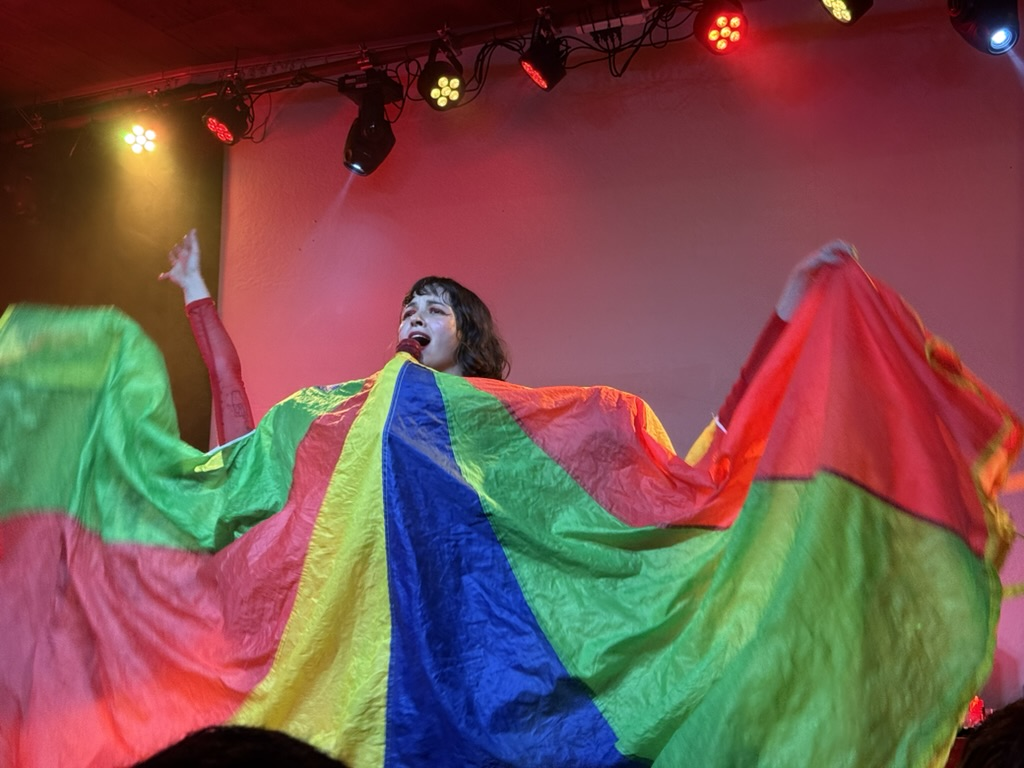
Haha's visual style frequently incorporates childhood toys, such as playground parachutes

Songs in Switcheroo received comparisons to pop art, Sid and Marty Krofft, Giorgio Moroder, Devo, Caroline Polachek, OMD, and Magdalena Bay. She has also mentioned taking inspirations from her childhood musical memories, including such favorite artists as Britney Spears, Gwen Stefani, and Avril Lavigne.

Abaya describes Haha as existing "somewhere between Studio 54 and Area 51". Haha's aesthetic notably revolves around the color red, as well as media for children, such as Pee Wee Herman. Supplemental inspirations for Haha's style and music included the philosopher Osho and his belief that seriousness was a "disease", as well as vaudeville, the DFA Records collective, and New York City's Club Kids.

== Discography ==
=== As Angel Abaya ===
==== Studio albums ====
List of studio albums by Angel Abaya
| Title | Album details |
|---|---|
| The Bubble | Released: May 5, 2023; Label: Earth Libraries; Format: Streaming, digital download |

==== Extended plays (EPs) ====
List of extended plays by Angel Abaya
| Title | EP details |
|---|---|
| Quaranmood | Released: October 16, 2020; Label: Earth Libraries; Format: Streaming, digital download |

==== Singles ====
List of singles by Angel Abaya
| Year | Title | Album |
|---|---|---|
| 2020 | "River" | Non-album singles |
| 2021 | "Sleepy Shine" | Non-album singles |
| 2023 | "Over/On/Under" | The Bubble |
| 2023 | "Through The Glass" | The Bubble |
| 2023 | "Better" | The Bubble |
| 2023 | "The Bubble" | The Bubble |

=== As Gelli Haha ===
==== Studio albums ====
List of studio albums by Gelli Haha
| Title | Album details |
|---|---|
| Switcheroo | Released: June 27, 2025; Label: Innovative Leisure; Format: Streaming, digital download, LP, CD |

==== Singles ====
List of singles by Gelli Haha
| Year | Title | Album |
|---|---|---|
| 2025 | "Bounce House" | Switcheroo |
| 2025 | "Funny Music" | Switcheroo |
| 2025 | "Spit" | Switcheroo |
| 2025 | "Normalize" | Switcheroo |
| 2026 | "Klouds Will Carry Me To Sleep" | Switcheroo |
