= Savage Times =

Studio album by Hanni El Khatib
- Released: February 17, 2017
- Length: 59:35
- Label: Innovative Leisure

Hanni El Khatib chronology
Moonlight (2015)	Savage Times (2017)	Flight (2020)

Savage Times is the fourth studio album by American singer-songwriter Hanni El Khatib. It was released on February 17, 2017 through Innovative Leisure.

== Critical reception ==
Professional ratings
Aggregate scores
Source	Rating
Metacritic	77/100
Review scores
Source	Rating
AllMusic	4/5 stars
Clash	7/10
Loud and Quiet	6/10
Record Collector	4/5 stars
The Line of Best Fit	6.5/10

Savage Times was met with generally favourable reviews from music critics. At Metacritic, which assigns a normalized rating out of 100 to reviews from mainstream publications, the album received an average score of 77, based on five reviews.

AllMusic's Timothy Monger called the album "indeed raw, desperate, and chock-full of new ideas and sounds, making this a creative breakout for El Khatib". Kris Needs of Record Collector praised the album, stating: "the messages of richly-orchestrated missives like "Gun Clap Hero" deserve to be heard; hopefully their contagious settings will take them to the masses". Aurora Henni Krogh of Clash described it: "as a whole, Savage Times is a chaotic, yet interesting album". Sarah Dawood of The Line of Best Fit resumed: "listeners may not like the whole album--but they’ll almost definitely love it in parts".

== Track listing ==
No.	Title	Length
1.	"Baby's OK"	2:25
2.	"Gonna Die Alone"	3:18
3.	"Born Brown"	1:54
4.	"Paralyzed"	3:12
5.	"Miracle"	3:02
6.	"Mangos & Rice"	2:56
7.	"Come Down"	2:44
8.	"No Way"	3:36
9.	"Mondo and His Makeup"	2:36
10.	"Gun Clap Hero"	4:26
11.	"Black Constellation"	3:31
12.	"So Dusty"	3:24
13.	"Till Your Rose Comes Home"	2:34
14.	"Hold Me Back"	3:49
15.	"Savage Times"	3:16
16.	"1AM"	2:07
17.	"Peep Show"	2:46
18.	"This I Know"	2:37
19.	"Freak Freely"	5:22
Total length:		59:35

== Charts ==
Chart (2017)	Peak position
French Albums (SNEP)	79
