= Switcheroo (disambiguation) =

A switcheroo is a sudden unexpected variation or reversal, often for a humorous purpose.

Switcheroo may also refer to:

- Switcheroo (Gelli Haha album), 2025
- Switcheroo, a 1998 novel by Olivia Goldsmith
- Switcheroo, a 2016 novel by Aaron Elkins
- "Switcheroo", a pricing game from The Price Is Right TV series
- "Switcheroo", an episode of American Dragon: Jake Long TV series
- "Switcheroo (Space Ghost Coast to Coast)", an episode of Space Ghost Coast to Coast
- "Switcheroo", a 2012 episode of This American Life radio program
- "Switcheroo", track on the 2000 Superfast (Dynamite Hack album)

== See also ==
- Comic strip switcheroo, a 1997 April Fools' Day practical joke
- The Switcheroo Series: Alexisonfire vs. Moneen, a 2005 EP by bands Alexisonfire and Moneen
- "The Great Switcheroo", a short story by Roald Dahl
- Katie Kazoo, Switcheroo, a book series by Nancy E. Krulik
