= Hanging Gardens (Classixx album) =

Studio album by Classixx
- Released: May 14, 2013
- Recorded: 2007–13
- Genre: Electropop; French house; nu-disco; synth-pop; electro house; progressive house; soft rock; dancehall
- Length: 55:46
- Label: Innovative Leisure; Future Classic
- Producer: Classixx

Classixx chronology
Hanging Gardens (2013)	Faraway Reach (2016)

Singles from Hanging Gardens
- 1. "I'll Get You" Released: October 5, 2009; 2. "Holding On" Released: February 11, 2013; 3. "All You're Waiting For" Released: April 24, 2013

Hanging Gardens is the debut studio album by Los Angeles-based electronic music production duo Classixx, consisting of Michael David and Tyler Blake. The duo had been making tracks since 2007 but did not decide to release a full-length album until much later because of their concerns over whether or not listeners really wanted an LP from them. In making the record, Classixx went for a record with "hooky melod[ies]," "some nice chords," and a positive feel-good tone while still having depth not common in dance music. Hanging Garden is an electropop album that contains elements of a wide variety of genres such as French dance music, rock, Chicago house, R&B, techno, and balearic beat. The LP features collaborations from acts such as Nancy Whang, Active Child, Sarah Chernoff, Jeppe, and Jesse Kivel.

Promoted with single releases for "I'll Get You," "Holding On," and "All You're Waiting For" and music videos for the songs "Holding On," "All You're Waiting For," and "Stranger Love," Hanging Gardens was distributed by Innovative Leisure and Future Classic on May 14, 2013. Responses from professional reviewers were favorable in general and ranked in the top 50 of numerous year-end lists by publications such as Rolling Stone, Gigwise, and Billboard; some critics called it superior from most other dance albums due to its songwriting, while some were more critical of the LP's instrumental tracks and repetitiveness. Thump has ranked it the 84th best dance album ever released. The LP also did well commercially, landing in the top 15 on the American Billboard Independent Albums and Heatseekers Albums charts.

== Background ==
Classixx had been working on songs since 2007. For a while, they were very skeptical about making a studio album. As Michael David explained, "we struggled for a little bit as to whether or not people care[d] for a full-length album, especially from two producers." "I'll Get You," a track that would later appear on Hanging Gardens, was released as a single on October 5, 2009; its music video for the song was done by American photographer Mark Hunter, also known as Cobrasnake, which involves a female in a bikini dancing to the track on a beach. It was until they had produced a certain number of tracks that the duo "felt like [they] were on to something decent" and decided to create an album.

== Production ==
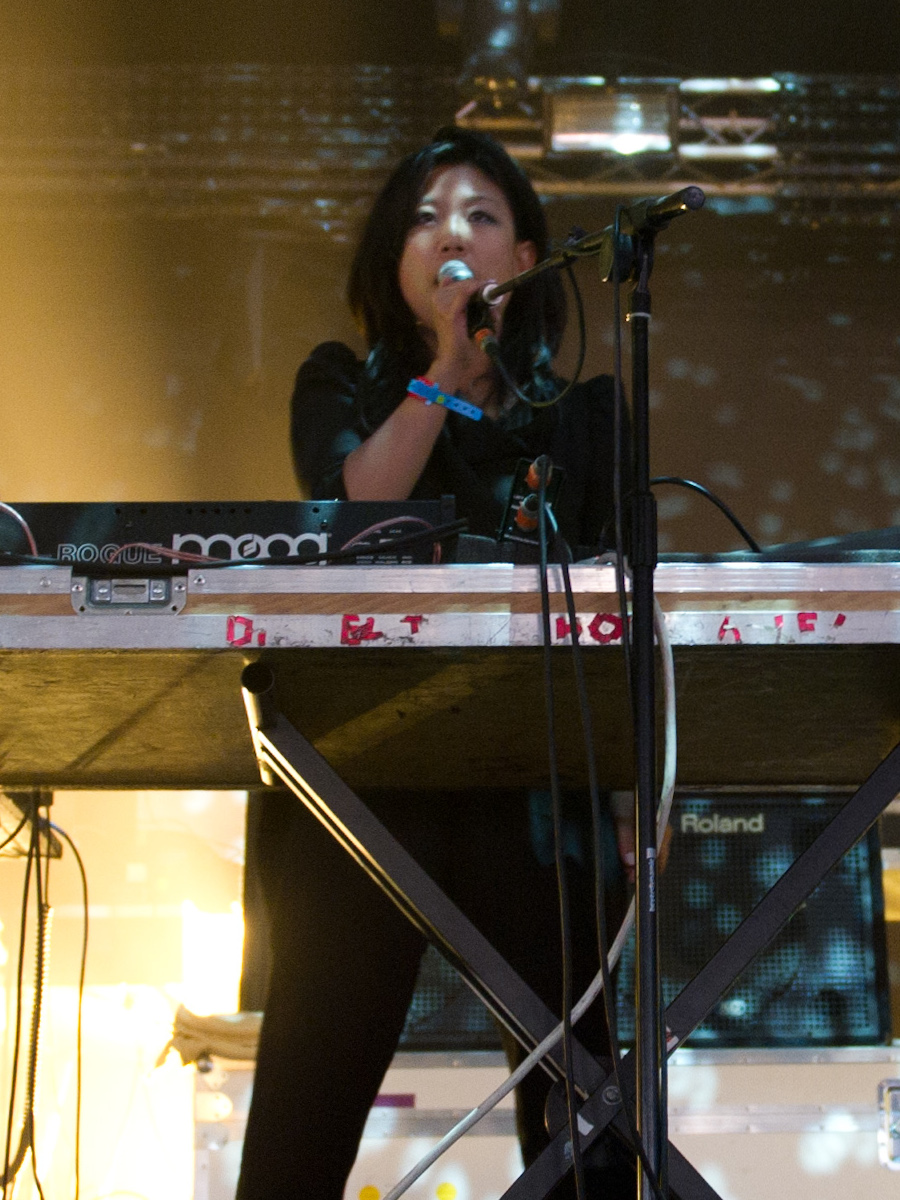
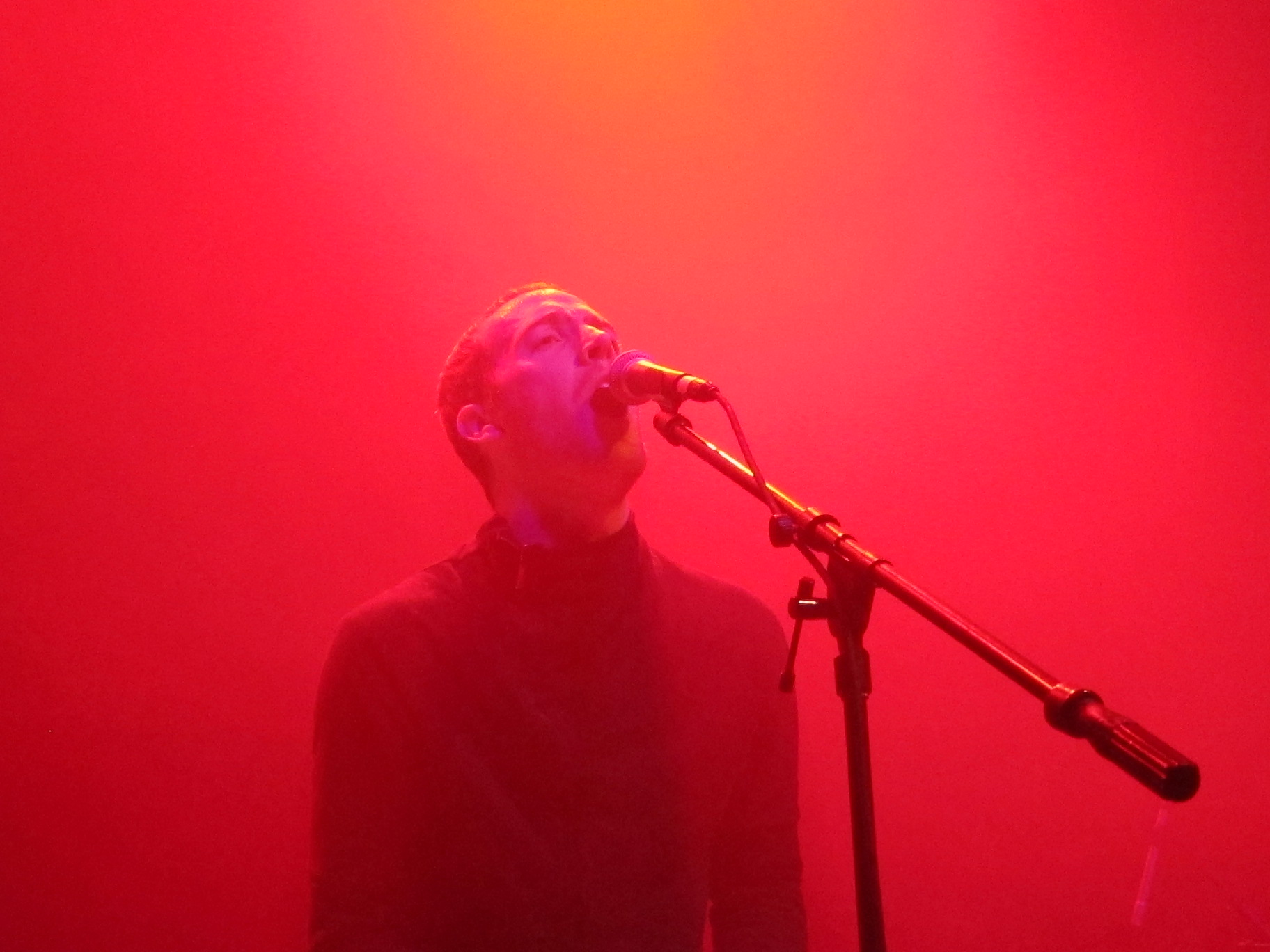
Hanging Gardens features collaborations with artists such as Nancy Whang (left) and Active Child (right).

Hanging Gardens was mainly recorded in Classixx's studio on Santa Clara Avenue in Venice Beach. The duo wanted all of the tracks to be "symbolic representation[s]" of their life in Venice Beach. For instance, the title of "Rhythm Santa Clara’ represents the location of their Santa Clara studio. When the duo formed, they originally only used software synthesizers like NI Massive, but later on, they began using outboard equipment; thus, most of the tracks on Hanging Gardens includes many sounds that were produced with analog synthesizers. The album's closer "Borderline," was originally planned to have an actual drumbeat, but the duo chose to only have claps for percussion to give the track an "unsettling" effect.

Hanging Gardens includes collaborations with artists such as Nancy Whang, Active Child, Sarah Chernoff, Jeppe, and Jesse Kivel. However, Classixx intended to create collaborations for the LP at least as possible, Blake reasoning that “when you make a record represented by the collaborations, you get lost in your sound." They also did not want to use acts that were very popular but rather actual friends to work with because, as David explained, "when you have these albums with like, big names to help propel the record, it can feel really disjointed and you don’t get great work because they’re doing you a favor." Whang's vocals were tracked at a Brooklyn studio run by Nick Millhiser of the band Holy Ghost!.

The title of Hanging Garden was conceived by the duo from looking at a picture of a futuristic building by Renzo Piano in the middle of the rainforest. The artwork was done by Australian designer Jonathan Zawada. With the cover art, the duo intended a symbol that was similar to the logo for the Olympic Games. However, Alejandra Ramirez of Complex described it as a homage to the cover of Tangerine Dream's record Optical Race (1988).

== Composition ==
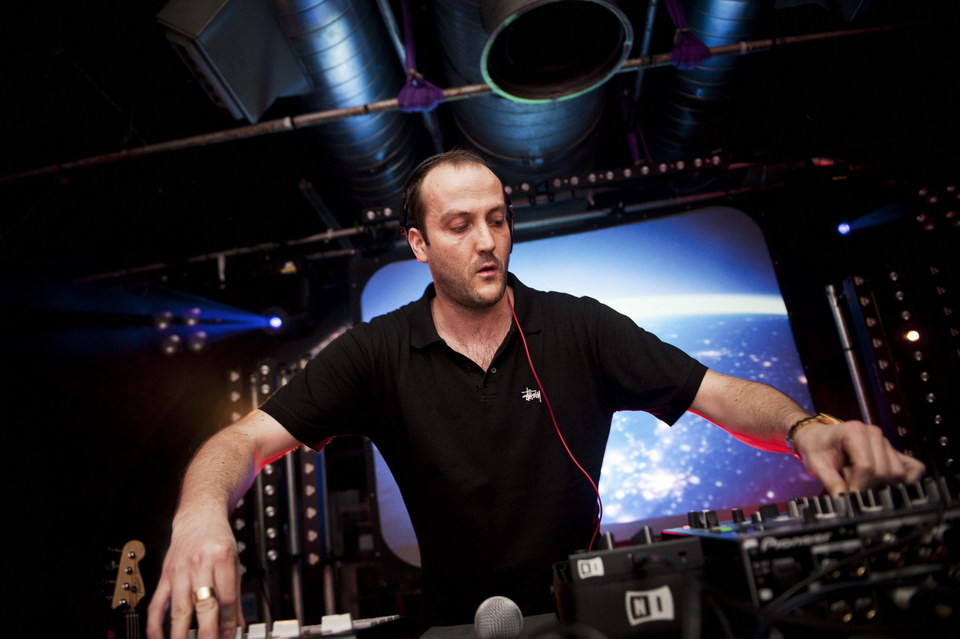
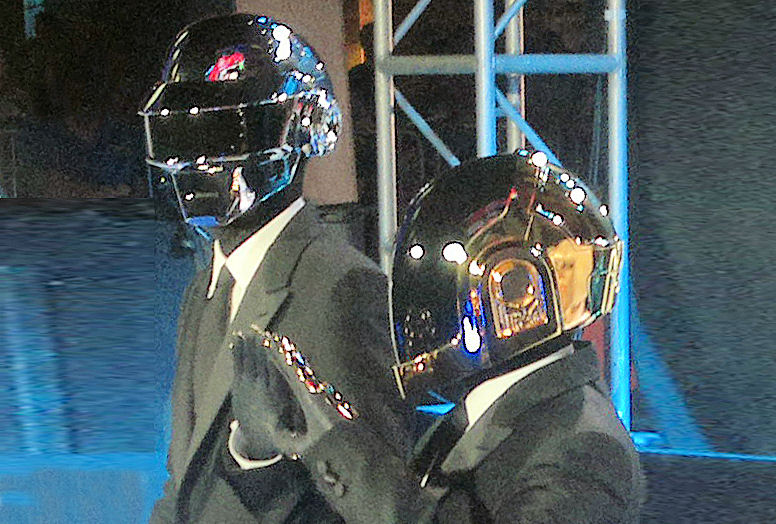
Classixx garnered influence from French music acts such as Fred Falke (left) and Daft Punk (right).

Hanging Gardens is a 1980s-style electropop album that touches on many types of musical genres and synthesizer textures. It uses melodies in the vein of classic rock, and AllMusic journalist Tim Sendra categorized Hanging Gardens as a combination of "uptempo neo-disco tracks with moody, late-night ballads, and sunny tropical jams with a driving-through-rain-soaked-city-streets vibe." Freelance writer Jordan Manizer labeled “A Fax from the Beach” a "pseudo-ambient" track, Contactmusic.com described "Rhythm Santa Clara" as a techno cut, while Pitchfork's Larry Fitzmaurice categorized "Long Lost" as an "ethereal R&B-leaning tune." The album also includes elements of Chicago house, balearic beat, trance, electro-funk, what Paul Lester of The Guardian described as the "chilldisco" works of Active Child and Toro y Moi, and music by New Order.

Classixx was influenced by French music acts such as Fred Falke and Daft Punk; "Holding On" includes synthesizer similar to those in Falke's track "808 PM at the Beach," while "All You're Waiting For" is reminiscent of tracks from Daft Punk's LP Discovery (2001). David reasoned that "French dance music artists modernized music genres like boogi funk and italo disco and churned repetitive synth beats into danceable pop-structured songs." A journalist for NPR Music categorized Hanging Gardens as "French house through a smooth Yacht Rock lens." Other and influences and inspirations for the album's sound include Michael Jackson, Quincy Jones, Giorgio Moroder, DFA, Kraftwerk, and Talking Heads.

With Hanging Gardens, Classixx went for an LP that had depth, therefore not being "a dance record from beginning to end," but also still had a "fun[] dance groove." They were very focused on making a pop album with "hooky melod[ies]," "some nice chords," and a positive feel-good tone. All of the tracks consist of what Ramirez labeled as "glossy synths and glassy-eyed club gestures" and range in style from mainstream accessible dance music cuts like 'Holding On" to deep house songs such as "Rhythm Santa Clara." Lester analyzed the LP "has a sort of nostalgic-for-now quality of ebullient sadness that works well as a soundtrack for late summer." As Kirk Williams analyzed, Hanging Gardens is a melodic album that, in addition to synthesizers, also uses live instruments "for optimal emotional impact." Ramirez noted that the LP has a "push-and-pull" method of balancing its "kitschiness and tasteful" elements; he used “Do You Like Bass" as a specimen for this, where the vocal line “Do you like bass" is "absurdly repeated to kitschy excess, but coupled with gilded bass thumps, and sunny warbles, the song works."

== Promotion ==
A single for "Holding On" was issued on February 11, 2013, and its music video premiered via The Fader on February 20. The video is a tribute to the French drama film Rendez-vous (1985) and involves David and Blake driving around Los Angeles. A remix EP featuring three re-edits of the song from LifeLike, Jerome LOL, and LoSoul was issued in April 2013. The album's next single was "You're Waiting For," issued on April 24, 2013, and garnering a "Best New Track" review from Pitchfork upon its release. The song's music video was released on July 24, 2013, and produced for a "Music Video Series" run by Urban Outfitters. Directed by Tim K, the video depicts Whang as a wealthy person on a ship that includes several jewels, gowns, puppies, martinis, and dancing shirtless sailors. The message of the video is that many fancy objects are not really pretty or useful. An official black-and-white music video for "Stranger Love" was released on April 2, 2014, and involves two kids sneaking out of their houses to roam around a town.

== Critical reception ==
Professional ratings
Aggregate scores
Source	Rating
Metacritic	82/100
Review scores
Source	Rating
AllMusic	4/5 stars
Big Shot	4/5 stars
Contactmusic.com	3/5 stars
The Digital Fix	6/10
Filter	82%
In Your Speakers	40/100
Mixmag	4/5 stars
Pitchfork	7.8/10
Spectrum Culture	3.5/5 stars
Spin	8/10

Responses from music journalists towards Hanging Gardens upon release were very favorable in general. In a review for Death and Taxes, Ned Hepburn stated, "Hanging Gardens is a beautiful, memorable album that will go down as one of the albums of the year. It’s classy and classic at the same time; a rare combo." Sendra honored Hanging Gardens as a "crash course on electronic pop in 2013," writing that "so many dance music producers rely on the beats and some dynamics to put their music across, but Classixx stand apart from the pack by writing songs with melodies that stick with you." Mainzer wrote that it showed that Classixx are "certainly capable of transcending its own genre to create something truly interdisciplinary."

Fitzmaurice called the album a "decadent trifle to lose yourself in, a deceptively simple record that has the potential for great longevity." He opined that "the biggest surprise of Hanging Gardens is that they're great songwriters, too" and "it's astonishing how many of the guest appearances simply work, and in such a satisfying way, too." Critic Gerrit Feenstra honored the record as "an indelible blend of old and new – retro without rust, progressive without distancing, and hopefulness and passion without cheese." He also noted, "Classixx have a unique vision to offer the dance floor through their vast, hopeful sound that keeps the energy building while giving the listener something more euphoric to experience."

However, Hanging Gardens also garnered a fair share of criticism. Both Fitzmaurice and Lester were the least favorable towards Hanging Gardens's instrumentals. Lester opined that the songs with vocals were the album's better tracks, reasoning that they "engage" the listener in terms of emotion, while Fitzmaurice explained that the instrumental tracks "aren't quite distinctive enough to push the five-and-six-minute mark as they frequently do." The Digital Fix called the album a "winning cocktail of contagious, party-inducing dance and more chilled, melodic tunes will prove to be a hot weather soundtrack for many." However, they were also mixed towards the songs in the middle part of the record; they stated that since there were "few vocal samples or variation to add interest, these tracks simply fall short of the mark, and allow a dull repetition to set in."

In a piece for In Your Speakers, Lindsay Saunders also criticized the repetitive nature of the LP and summarized that, despite having a few "shining moments," "the music fits the album art because it sounds like something you would work out to, but not a particularly enjoyable record in and of itself." In a review for Ion magazine, writer Trevor Risk was very harsh towards Hanging Gardens, calling it "completely bland, with maybe enough good musical ideas to fill one track at best." His review also lambasted that labels "enlist electronic acts to pump out LPs either to fulfill contracts, or to try and legitimize themselves in the world of “pop” and claim that they've all moved on from doing remixes, as if that's below them at this point."

== Accolades ==
Hanging Gardens was in the top 50 of numerous year-end lists. It was number 37 on a year-end list of best albums by independent music blog Obscure Sound, where Mike Mineo called it the "life of the party," "vibrant and brimming with color," and wrote that it "shows some of the most engaging sounds and production in the electronica scene today." Putting the LP at number 17 on their "50 best albums of 2013," Gigwise stated that it "is the embodiment of summer, comprised of a tracklist that screams sunshine through its bouncy electronic grooves and excellent production."

Hanging Gardens was also number 17 on Billboard's list of 2013's best dance albums. They highlighted its "relaxed confidence that belongs at a daytime party in any city," and also noted, "It’s one thing to produce an album that embodies a sound, but the L.A. duo has also left enough space on “Hanging Gardens” to inspire a scene." Rolling Stone put it on their list of the best dance albums of the year at number 20, while on a list of the best albums of 2013 by Gorilla vs. Bear, the LP ranked number 28. On Thump's list of the "99 Greatest Dance Albums of All Time," Hanging Gardens was number 84, with the publication describing it as "12 tracks of happy-go-lucky perfection. If you soundtracked the best first date in history, you'd get this. Swipe right forever."

== Track listing ==
Track lengths adapted from 7digital.

No.	Title	Length
1.	"Hanging Gardens"	5:24
2.	"All You're Waiting for" (featuring Nancy Whang)	4:17
3.	"Holding On"	6:20
4.	"Rhythm Santa Clara"	3:02
5.	"Dominoes"	4:13
6.	"A Fax from the Beach"	5:39
7.	"Long Lost" (featuring Active Child)	4:51
8.	"Stranger Love" (featuring Sarah Chernoff)	3:59
9.	"I'll Get You" (featuring Jeppe)	3:59
10.	"Supernature"	3:49
11.	"Jozi's Fire"	5:46
12.	"Borderline" (featuring Jesse Kivel)	4:27
Total length:		55:46

Sample credits

- "Hanging Gardens" uses an altered version of the lead melody of "Seven Wonders," a song by Fleetwood Mac
- "Holding On" features a sample of "Escape" by The Deeper Band

== Personnel ==
Production

- Written and produced by Michael David and Tyler Blake
- Recorded in Venice Beach, Los Angeles and "some rooms in New York"
- Mixed by Eric Broucek
- Mastered by Bob Weston at Chicago Mastering Service in Chicago, Illinois
- Artwork by Jonathan Zawada

Performers

- Michael David
- Tyler Blake
- Andrew Ampaya
- Andrew Raposo
- August Glahn-AbrahamsenBonneville
- First Ward Children's Choir
- Carlo Dall'Amico
- Filip Nikolic
- Guy Licata
- Jamie Muhoberac
- Jeppe
- Jesse Kivel
- Justin Meldal-Johnsen
- Laythan Armor
- Morgan Wiley
- Nancy Whang
- Nick Millheiser
- Noelle Scaggs
- Patrick Grossi
- Ryan Levine
- Sarah Chernoff
- Simon "Woolfy" James

== Release history ==
Region	Date	Format(s)	Label
Worldwide	May 14, 2013	Digital download; CD; vinyl	Innovative Leisure
Australia; New Zealand	May 14, 2013	Compact disc	Future Classic

== Charts ==
Chart (2013)	Peak position
US Top Dance/Electronic Albums (Billboard)	13
US Top Heatseekers Albums (Billboard)	12
