= Wild & Free =

Wild & Free may refer to:

- Wild & Free (album), a 2013 album by A Rocket to the Moon
- Wild & Free (band), a Los Angeles based duo
- "Wild & Free" (song), a 2015 song by Lena Meyer-Landrut
- Wild & Free (TV series), a Brazilian reality television series

== See also ==
- Wild and Free, a 2011 album by Ziggy Marley
- "Wild 'N Free", a 1995 song by Rednex
