= II (Khun Narin album) =

Live album by Khun Narin
- Released: March 25, 2016
- Recorded: 2016
- Genre: Psychedelic rock
- Length: 39:52
- Label: Innovative Leisure
- Producer: Josh Marcy

Khun Narin chronology
Electric Phin Band (2014)	II (2016)

Professional ratings
Review scores
Source	Rating
Allmusic	3.5/5 stars
Robert Christgau	(2-star Honorable Mention)

II is the second live album by Khun Narin, released on March 25, 2016 by Innovative Leisure Records.

== Track listing ==
No.	Title	Length
1.	"Phua kao"	3:52
2.	"Phom rak mueang Thai"	4:39
3.	"Baisi sukhwan"	5:38
4.	"Sao kalasin lam phloen"	5:56
5.	"Chackim"	3:17
6.	"Long wat"	5:52
7.	"Thang jai thang jao"	7:45
8.	"Sao ubon ro rak"	2:53

== Personnel ==
Adapted from the II liner notes.

Khun Narin

- Witthawat Chimphali – bass guitar
- Phirasak Hutsi – chap cymbal
- Chanwit Khomkham – klong khaek
- Buntham Makam – klong khaek
- Wirot Manachip – chap cymbal
- Akchadawut Nangngam – klong khaek
- Wanlop Saengarun – tenor drum, splash cymbal
- Nattapol Soison – phin, chap cymbal
- Chaiyan Sonpoh – phin
- Wirot Yakham – musical direction, chap cymbal

Production and design

- Nathan Cabrera – cover art, illustrations
- Dave Cooley – mastering
- Edouard Degay Delpeuch – photography
- Sonny Diperri – mixing
- Hanni El Khatib – art direction, design
- Josh Marcy – production, recording, photography
- Trevor Tarczynski – art direction, design

== Charts ==
Chart (2014)	Peak position
US World Albums (Billboard)	8

== Release history ==
Region	Date	Label	Format	Catalog
United States	2016	Innovative Leisure	CD, LP	IL2036
