= Switcheroo (Gelli Haha album) =

Studio album by Gelli Haha
- Released: June 27, 2025
- Genre: Alternative dance Electroclash
- Length: 34:37
- Label: Innovative Leisure
- Producers: Angel Abaya; Sean Guerin

Singles from Switcheroo
- 1. "Bounce House" Released: March 19, 2025; 2. "Funny Music" Released: April 24, 2025; 3. "Spit" Released: May 28, 2025; 4. "Normalize" Released: June 11, 2025; 5. "Klouds Will Carry Me To Sleep" Released: March 25, 2026

Switcheroo is the second studio album by American alternative pop artist Angel Abaya, and her first album released under the name Gelli Haha. It was released on June 27, 2025, via Innovative Leisure in LP, CD and digital formats.

== Background ==
The album was produced by Sean Guerin, who also co-wrote it. It incorporates elements of alternative dance and was created using music production equipment by companies such as Eventide and MXR. The album's first single, "Bounce House" was released on March 19, 2025. It was followed by "Funny Music", the second single on April 24, 2025.

== Reception ==
Professional ratings
Review scores
Source	Rating
AllMusic	3.5/5 stars
Pitchfork	7.6/10

Writing for The Quietus, Claire Biddles described the album as "tonnes of fun in its own right, but is also ripe with potential for further transmissions from the Gelliverse." AllMusic assigned it a rating of three and a half, stating "Goofy, fun, and reliably catchy, Switcheroo does indeed live up to its own premise."

The album received a 7.6 rating from Pitchfork, whose reviewer Harry Tafoya described it as encompassing "stoned revelation, gross-out humor, and a stockpile of bizarro sound effects" and "riotously fun production and full-barreled commitment to silliness."

== Track listing ==
All tracks are written by Angel Abaya and Sean Guerin.

No.	Title	Length
1.	"Funny Music"	3:21
2.	"Spit"	3:19
3.	"Normalize"	3:15
4.	"Bounce House"	3:32
5.	"Piss Artist"	3:33
6.	"Tiramisu"	3:00
7.	"Gelliverse"	3:01
8.	"Dynamite"	3:42
9.	"Johnny"	3:23
10.	"Pluto Is Not a Planet It's a Restaurant"	4:31
Total length:		34:37

2026 Reissue
No.	Title	Length
11.	"Klouds Will Carry Me To Sleep"	3:44
Total length:		38:21

== Personnel ==
Credits adapted from Tidal.

- Angel Abaya – vocals, production
- Sean Guerin – drums, programming, production, mixing
- Kelly Hibbert – mastering
- Claire June Apana – art direction
- Kat Brouwer – cover art
- Sophie Prettyman-Beauchamp – photography
- Juju Haha – back cover photo
- Sisi Haha – back cover photo
- Colin Pinegar – graphic assistant
