= Tropics (musician) =

- Birth name: Christopher Ward
- Born: 1988 or 1989 (age 35–36)
- Origin: Southampton, England
- Genres: Electronic
- Years active: 2010–present
- Labels: Planet Mu; Svetlana Industries; Five Easy Pieces; Innovative Leisure; Plus Fours

Tropics is the stage name of English electronic musician Chris Ward. Originally from Southampton England, he presently lives in Los Angeles.

== History ==
In 2013, Tropics released his EP, titled Popup Cinema. That same year Tropics also released another EP titled Home & Consonance via Five Easy Pieces. In 2015, Tropics released his full-length album, titled Rapture, via Innovative Leisure. His fourth album, Nocturnal Souls, was released in 2018 through Plus Fours.

== Discography ==
Studio albums

- Parodia Flare (2011, Planet Mu)
- Rapture (2015, Innovative Leisure)
- Nocturnal Souls (2018, Plus Fours)

EPs

- Soft Vision (2010, Planet Mu)
- Home & Consonance (2013, Five Easy Pieces)
- Popup Cinema (2013, Svetlana Industries)
