= GB City =

Studio album by Bass Drum of Death
- Released: April 12, 2011
- Genre: Garage rock, noise rock, grunge, lo-fi
- Length: 32:31 (original) / 34:29 (iTunes edition)
- Label: Fat Possum Records
- Producer: John Barrett

Bass Drum of Death chronology
GB City (2011)	Bass Drum of Death (2013)

Professional ratings
Aggregate scores
Source	Rating
Metacritic	69/100
Review scores
Source	Rating
Allmusic	3.5/5 stars
Consequence	3.5/5 stars

GB City is the debut studio album by Bass Drum of Death. It was released on Fat Possum Records on April 12, 2011. The video for "Get Found" was released in 2011. A single For "High School Roaches," featuring the title song "Get Found," "You're Haunting Me," and "Spare Room" was released on Baby Don't Records in 2010.

== Track listing ==
No.	Title	Writer(s)	Length
1.	"Nerve Jamming"	John Barrett	2:37
2.	"GB City"	Barrett	3:04
3.	"Get Found"	Barrett	3:01
4.	"Velvet Itch"	Barrett	2:57
5.	"High School Roaches"	Barrett	2:34
6.	"Spare Room"	Barrett	2:56
7.	"Young Pros"	Barrett	2:40
8.	"Heart Attack Kid"	Barrett	2:43
9.	"Leaves"	Barrett	3:58
10.	"I Could Never Be Your Man"	Barrett	3:10
11.	"Religious Girls"	Barrett	2:51
Total length:			32:31

iTunes bonus track
No.	Title	Writer(s)	Length
12.	"He's So Fine †"	Ronald Mack	1:59
Total length:			34:29

† Cover of The Chiffons' pop/ doo-wop song He's So Fine
