= Rip This =

Studio album by Bass Drum of Death
- Released: October 7, 2014
- Genres: Garage rock, indie rock, noise rock, punk blues
- Length: 30:31
- Label: Innovative Leisure
- Producer: Jacob Portrait

Bass Drum of Death chronology
| Bass Drum of Death (2013) | Rip This (2014) | Just Business (2018) |

Professional ratings
Aggregate scores
| Source | Rating |
|---|---|
| Metacritic | 64/100 |
Review scores
| Source | Rating |
| Allmusic | 3.5/5 stars |
| NME | 7/10 stars |
| The Guardian | 3/5 stars |
| Consequence of Sound | C+ |

Rip This is the third studio album by Bass Drum of Death. It was released in October 2014 under Innovative Leisure.

== Track list ==
All songs written by John Barrett.

| No. | Title | Length |
|---|---|---|
| 1. | "Electric" | 3:25 |
| 2. | "Left For Dead" | 2:58 |
| 3. | "For Blood" | 2:21 |
| 4. | "Everything's The Same" | 2:39 |
| 5. | "Sin Is In 10" | 4:07 |
| 6. | "Black Don't Glow" | 3:10 |
| 7. | "Burns My Eye" | 2:36 |
| 8. | "Lose My Mind" | 3:56 |
| 9. | "Better Days" | 2:06 |
| 10. | "Route 69 (Yeah)" | 3:13 |

== Personnel ==
Bass Drum of Death

- John Barrett – guitars, lead vocals
- Len Clark – drums

Technical

- Jacob Portrait – engineer, mixing, producer
- Fred Kevorkian – mastering

Photography

- Brock Fetch – cover photo
