= Khun Narin =

- Origin: Phetchabun, Thailand
- Genres: Psychedelic rock
- Labels: Innovative Leisure
- Website: www.innovativeleisure.net

Khun Narin is a psychedelic music ensemble based out of the Phetchabun Province in Thailand. Led by Khun Narin, the group is known locally for their impromptu improvisational performances situated at backyard parties and parades. The group comprises a constantly rotating line-up of native musicians of varying ages, from children to elderly men.

Khun Narin were discovered via YouTube when music producer Josh Marcy happened upon videos of their live performances. With his assistance, they released their first album, titled Electric Phin Band, on August 26, 2014.

== History ==
Khun Narin were discovered in early 2013 by Los Angeles music producer Josh Marcy when he happened upon a YouTube video of the group performing live. The channel belonged to Thai phin player Beer Sitthichai, who had been recording and uploading videos of Khun Narin since late 2010. The group was locally respected and known to perform at parties. A video of the group performing "Zombie" by The Cranberries piqued Marcy's interest and he contacted Innovative Leisure Records. Innovative Leisure shared Marcy's interest in the band's music and paid for his plane trip to find them. After arriving in Thailand, Marcy contacted Peter Doolan, an American living in Bangkok who was an admirer of the group and had contact with them.

Josh Marcy recorded an improvised live session of Narin Phin to serve as the content for the album Electric Phin Band, which was released on August 26, 2014 by Innovative Leisure Records. Critical response was very favorable and the band was lauded for their skilled and lively performances. The group followed up that release in 2016 with the release of II, issued by Innovative Leisure Records.

== Musical style ==
The music of Khun Narin is grounded on Thai and Laotian melodies informed by garage music and psychedelic rock. Critics have noted a resemblance to the music of Konono Nº1 and Incredible String Band. Despite comparisons, the group claims to have had little exposure to more widely celebrated rock acts. When asked about Khun Narin's connection to psychedelic music, Marcy responded "It just happens to have turned out in a way that sounds familiar, in that vein, to us. They'd never heard the Grateful Dead or things like that."

== Discography ==
- Electric Phin Band (Innovative Leisure, 2014)
- II (Innovative Leisure, 2016)
