= Electric Phin Band =

Live album by Khun Narin
- Released: August 26, 2014
- Recorded: 2014
- Genre: Psychedelic rock
- Length: 40:23
- Label: Innovative Leisure
- Producer: Josh Marcy

Khun Narin chronology
Electric Phin Band (2014)	II (2016)

Electric Phin Band is the debut live album of Khun Narin, released on August 26, 2014 by Innovative Leisure Records.

== Critical reception ==
Professional ratings
Review scores
Source	Rating
Allmusic	3.5/5 stars
Robert Christgau	B+

Reception of Electric Phin Band has been positive. In his review for Allmusic, Fred Thomas described the group's playing as "warped, drunkenly playful, and mired in the influence of Western pop and celebratory psychedelia." Dustin Krcatovich of The Quietus was similarly enthusiastic, saying "the music shares rock and roll's mother-heartbeat propulsion but largely eschews its structures, having much more to do with traditional Thai folk forms. The resulting music is raucous, deft, loud, and awesome." Music journalist Robert Christgau gave the album a B+ on his rating scale, calling the music "lively yet quiet."

== Track listing ==
No.	Title	Length
1.	"Lam phu tai"	11:41
2.	"Lai sing"	4:38
3.	"Sut sanaen"	4:35
4.	"Show wong khun narin"	19:29

== Personnel ==
Adapted from the Electric Phin Band liner notes.

Khun Narin

- Sitthichai Charoenkhwan – phin
- Witthawat Chimphali – bass drum
- Buntham Makam – bass drum
- Wirot Manachip – ching
- Wanlop Saengarun – drums, cymbal
- Chaiphichit Taraphan – bass guitar
- Wirot Yakham – musical direction, cymbal

Production and additional personnel

- Nathan Cabrera – cover art
- Josh Marcy – production, recording, photography
- Trevor Tarczynski – design

== Chart positions ==
Chart (2014)	Peak position
US World Albums (Billboard)	2
US Heatseekers Albums (Billboard)	43

== Release history ==
Region	Date	Label	Format	Catalog
United States	2014	Innovative Leisure	CD, CS, LP	IL2021
