= Bass Drum of Death =

American garage punk band

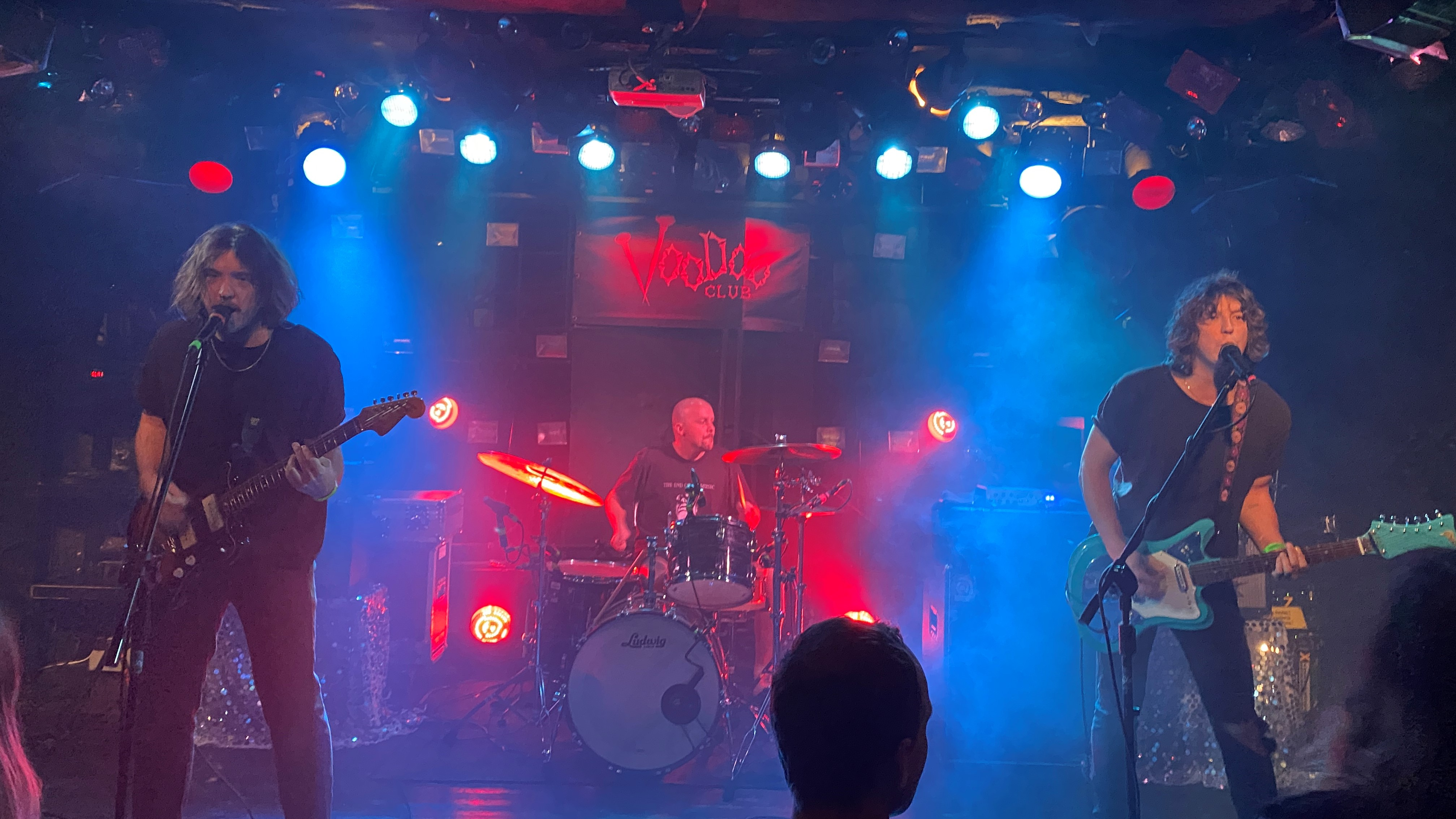
- Bass Drum of Death performing in Warsaw (2023).

Background information
- Also known as: John Barrett's Bass Drum of Death
- Origin: Oxford, Mississippi, U.S.
- Genres: Garage rock; garage punk; noise rock; punk rock
- Years active: 2008–present
- Labels: Fat Possum Records, Muscle Beach Records, Innovative Leisure, Because
- Members: John Barrett; Jim Barrett; Ian Kirkpatrick
- Past members: Colin Sneed; Trent Chouteau; Josh Hunter; Len Clark; Eric Parisi
- Website: bassdrumofdeath.com

Bass Drum of Death is an American garage punk band from Oxford, Mississippi, United States, currently signed to Fat Possum Records.

== History ==
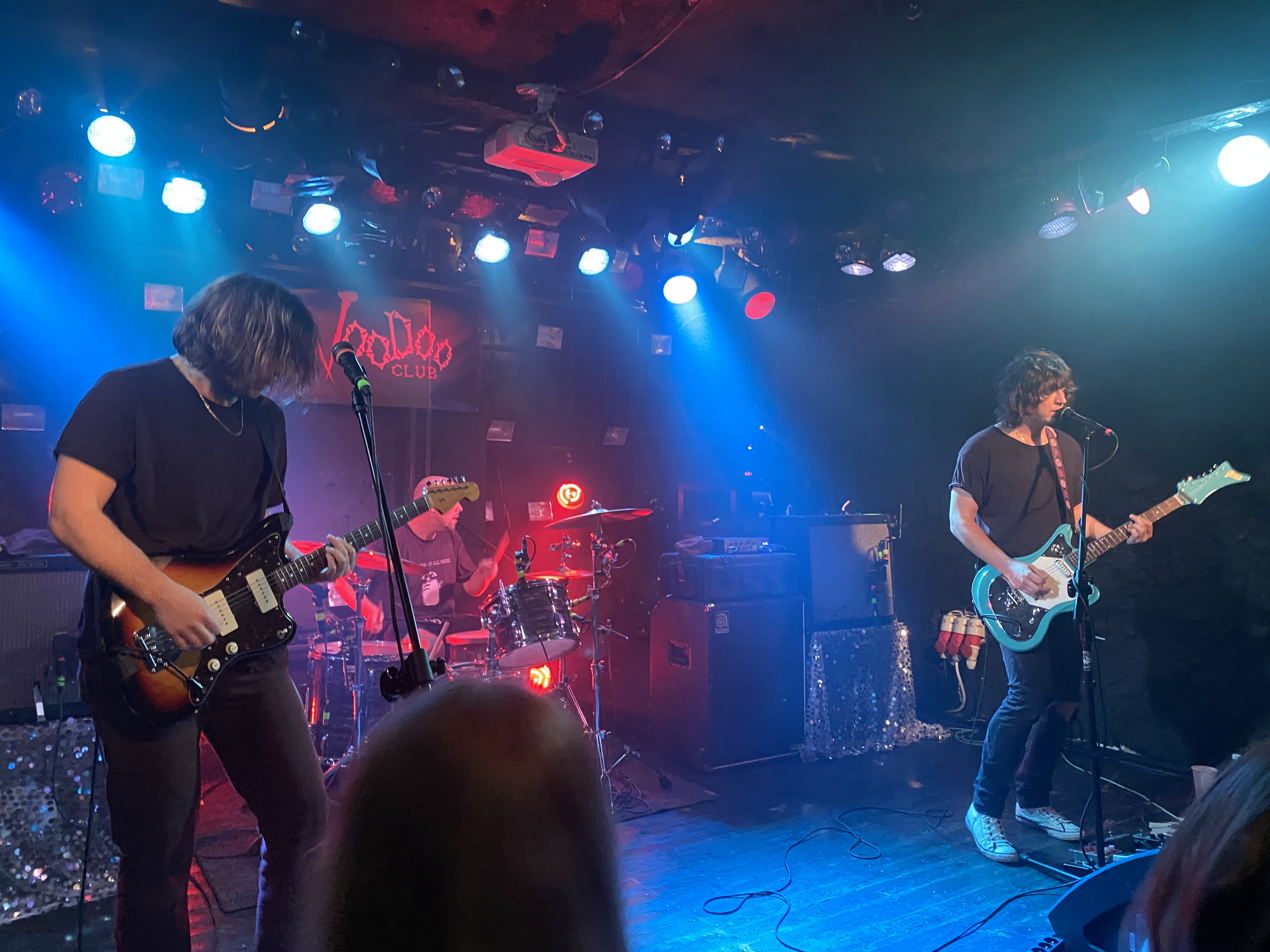
Bass Drum of Death performing in 2023.

=== Origins & GB City (2008–2012) ===
The band's frontman, John Barrett, formed Bass Drum of Death in 2008 as a one-man-band, playing both his bass drum and guitar. The band's members are from Oxford, Mississippi, and they played in Oxford to its booming music scene between 2008 and 2013 before Barrett decided to move to New York City. The touring band consists of two guitarists and a drummer. Barrett recorded their first two albums by himself.

Their debut LP, GB City, was released on April 12, 2011 by Fat Possum Records. Inflated Records also distributed the vinyl edition. In April 2011, Bass Drum of Death performed live on Fuel TV with MellowHype, of OFWGKTA, playing the song "64". Their song, "Get Found", has been aired on Triple J, an Australian alternative music radio station and the group played the station's 2012 New Beginning's Festival. In addition, Bass Drum of Death has performed at the Rock en Seine Festival in France.

=== Bass Drum of Death & Rip This (2013–2014) ===
In early 2013, the band was signed to Innovative Leisure Records. In two consecutive years, they released two full-length albums. On June 25, 2013, they released their second self-titled album, Bass Drum of Death and the following year, on October 7, 2014, they released their third album, Rip This, which featured drummer Len Clark as a new collaborative band member.

From the time of their inception, Bass Drum of Death has toured the United States and Europe extensively. In August 2014, the band performed in Brazil for the first time.

=== Hiatus & Just Business (2015–2020) ===
In May 2015, John Barrett announced through the band's social media accounts, that Bass Drum of Death would be going on a hiatus citing "personal issues", canceling their scheduled summer tour of Europe in the process. On September 5, 2015, the band returned playing the Made in America festival in Philadelphia, which was also seen on a webcast.

On November 3, 2017, Barrett, announced on Twitter that he had finished their fourth album, Just Business, which eventually released on July 27, 2018. The group followed that album with a 7-inch single, "Too Cold to Hold" / "Wait", released on Muscle Beach Records. It featured Bass Drum of Death founder and frontman John Barrett collaborating with his younger brother, Jim Barrett. The pair started writing songs in Brooklyn in early 2020 and finished recording in Oxford, Mississippi during the COVID-19 lockdown. The band also readied a full-length album.

=== Say I Won't & SIX (2022–present) ===
On September 14, 2022, the band announced their fifth studio album, Say I Won't, along with the release of the single "Say Your Prayers". The album marked the band's return to Fat Possum Records and was released on January 27, 2023. A second single, "Find It" was released on October 19, 2022. In 2024, the band released a live album entitled "Live... and Let Die". It was released on June 8, having been recorded in Chicago in April 2023.

On September 12, 2025, the band released their sixth studio album, SIX.

== In other media ==
=== Film ===
- "Velvet Itch" features in 2011's Ghost Rider: Spirit of Vengeance.
- "Heart Attack Kid", "Get Found", "Such A Bore", "High School Roaches", and "Nerve Jamming" all feature in 2014's Suburban Gothic.
- Their song "Left For Dead" features in 2017's Fist Fight.

=== Video Games ===
- "Get Found" features in 2012's MLB 2K12.
- "Crawling After You" features in the soundtrack of 2013's Grand Theft Auto V.
- "Crawling After You", "Electric", "Lose My Mind", and "Everything's the Same" all feature in the soundtrack of 2014's Forza Horizon 2.
- "I Wanna Be Forgotten" features during the credit sequence of 2014's Sunset Overdrive. Their tracks "I'm On The Run", "Between The Lines" and "Smell The Night" were also recorded for the game.
- "I Don't Wanna Know" features in the soundtrack for 2018's Forza Horizon 4.

=== TV ===
- "Way Out" features in an episode of The Vampire Diaries.
- "Nerve Jamming" features in an episode of Waterloo Road.
- "Just Business" features in an episode of Altered Carbon.
- "Bad Reputation" features in the pilot episode of 9-1-1.

=== Other ===
- Various other tracks of theirs have featured in advertisements for H&M, NASCAR, Jacamo and Folgers.
- "I Wanna Be Forgotten" was used in Thrasher Magazine's "King Of The Road".

== Discography ==
=== Studio albums ===
- GB City (2011)
- Bass Drum of Death (2013)
- Rip This (2014)
- Just Business (2018)
- Say I Won’t (2023)
- SIX (2025)

=== EPs ===
- EP (2008)
- High School Roaches (2010)
- Daytrotter Session (2011)
