= Sam Blasucci =

- Born: 21 November 1994 (age 31); Pasadena, California, US
- Origin: La Cañada Flintridge, California, US
- Genres: Experimental pop
- Occupations: Musician; songwriter; producer
- Instruments: Vocals; guitar; piano
- Years active: 2011–present
- Labels: Innovative Leisure; Calico Discos
- Member of: Mapache
- Website: www.samblasucci.com

Sam Blasucci is an American singer-songwriter based in Ojai, California. He is known for his solo work and as a member of folk rock duo Mapache.

== Biography ==
Blasucci was born in Pasadena, California and grew up in La Cañada Flintridge. He currently lives in Ojai. His father is David Blasucci, a musician and singer-songwriter who has performed in films A Mighty Wind and For Your Consideration.

While at school Blasucci played in several bands, including The Melvin Doo with his Mapache bandmate Clay Finch.

He formed Mapache with Clay Finch after his return to California and the band released their debut album, Spiritual Pajamas, in 2017. In 2023, Blasucci released his debut solo album, Off My Stars. As of 2026, he has released four solo albums.

In 2025, Blasucci and Bryce Makela directed and produced a conceptual live concert film to accompany his second solo album, Real Life Thing.

He has also self-published three volumes of poetry and art: Guidelines for Dying: Volume 1, Guidelines for Dying: Volume 2, and ORCHIDS.

Apart from Mapache and his solo work, Blasucci has also played (alongside Clay Finch) in Grateful Shred, a Grateful Dead covers band.

== Discography ==
Studio albums
Title	Details
Off My Stars	Released: 2 June 2023; Label: Innovative Leisure, Calico Discos; Formats: CD; LP; Digital download
Real Life Thing	Released: 1 November 2024; Label: Innovative Leisure, Calico Discos; Formats: LP; Digital download
ALL BLUE	Released: 6 June 2025; Label: Amateur Circus; Formats: LP; Digital download
Physical Dream	Released: 17 April 2026; Label: Calico Discos; Formats: Digital download
Black Rose	Released: 21 July 2026; Label: DoublePlay Records; Formats: Digital download
