= Just Business (album) =

Studio album by Bass Drum of Death
- Released: July 27, 2018
- Genres: Noise rock; punk rock; pop rock; punk blues
- Length: 36:07
- Label: Century Media

Bass Drum of Death chronology
Rip This (2014)	Just Business (2018)

Singles from Just Business
- 1. "Heavy" Released: May 11, 2018; 2. "Just Business" Released: June 1, 2018; 3. "Too High" Released: July 14, 2018

Just Business is the fourth studio album by American punk rock band, Bass Drum of Death. The album was released on July 27, 2018, through Century Media Records.

== Background ==
On June 1, 2018, the second single and title track "Just Business" was released. Impose praised the track for its more mature lyrics and described the style of the song as "a soaked signature fuzz we’ve all come to know and love from Bass Drum of Death".

== Track listing ==
1. "Third Coast Dreaming" (2:47)
2. "Too High" (3:47)
3. "Diamond in the Rough" (3:02)
4. "Failing Up" (2:57)
5. "Heavy" (2:16)
6. "I Don't Wanna Know" (3:14)
7. "Odds Are Good" (3:44)
8. "Just Business" (4:05)
9. "I Love You (I Think)" (3:05)
10. "I Thought I Told You" (3:29)
11. "Leaving" (2:49)

== Critical reception ==
Professional ratings
Review scores
Source	Rating
Flood Magazine	6/10

Thus far Just Business has received mixed reviews from contemporary music critics. Writing for Flood Magazine, Jonathan Pruett felt the album lacked a consistency, "his ability to leap from genre to genre (a bit of Only Ones pub-punk here, a bit Interpol-esque grandiose post-punk there) leaves you flustered."
