= Always (Panama EP) =

EP by Panama
- Released: 3 October 2013 (Australia); 2014 (USA)
- Venue: San Francisco
- Label: Future Classic
- Producer: Eric Broucek

Panama chronology
It's Not Over (2012)	Always (2013)	Hope for Something (2017)

Singles from Always
- 1. "How We Feel" Released: October 2013; 2. "Always" Released: October 2013; 3. "Strange Feeling" Released: February 2014

Always is the second extended play by Australian musician Panama, released in October 2013. The EP was certified platinum in Australia in 2020.

== Reception ==
Jamie Macmillian from HappyMag said, "The EP has solidified their sound as a band and has brought them to the forefront of new music, both here and internationally." Macmillian described opening track "Always" as "a powerful and engulfing song" saying "It's a solid dance track with plenty of house influences, tinted with a bit of pop which makes it addictive listening." He said "How We Feel" is his personal favourite out of all three tracks saying "It's a little more experimental with interesting effects and loops with definite dub vibes. The vocals on this track sound R&B influenced and add an interesting layer to the song." He described "Destroyer" as "a restrained dance/house track that sounds like it's from outer space".

Carena Liptak from Audio Femme said "Like debut It's Not Over, Always gears towards an electrically colorful synth pop, but on this release McCleary assumes a new assuredness over his music's texture and subtlety."

== Track listing ==
No.	Title	Writer(s)	Length
1.	"Always"	Jarrah McLeary	3:39
2.	"How We Feel"	McLeary	4:03
3.	"Destroyer"	McLeary	5:03
4.	"Strange Feeling" (Bonus track)	McLeary	4:43
5.	"Always" (Classixx remix)	McLeary	5:31
6.	"Always" (Wave Racer remix)	McLeary	3:41
7.	"Destroyer" (Cosmo's Midnight remix)	McLeary	3:38

- Note, tracks 5–7 are on the Deluxe Edition.

== Certifications ==
Region	Certification	Certified units/sales
Australia (ARIA)	Platinum	70,000^{‡}
^{‡} Sales+streaming figures based on certification alone.

== Release history ==
Country	Date	Format	Version	Label	Catalogue
Australia	3 October 2013	Digital download, 12" EP, CD	Standard	Future Classic	FCL98
Australia	1 November 2013	Digital download, streaming	Deluxe	Future Classic	—

== In-usage media ==
- "Always (Classixx remix)" was featured in the 2014 racing video game Forza Horizon 2.
- "Always" was featured in the 2013 open-world action game Grand Theft Auto V.
