= De Lux =

American post-disco musical duo

De Lux is an American post-disco musical duo from Los Angeles, consisting of Sean Guerin and Isaac Franco. Guerin and Franco began creating music together at the age of 15. As of 2017, the group is signed to Innovative Leisure. The band released their first album, Voyage, in 2014. It was praised by Paul Lester as not having "a bad track". In 2015, Generation was released and the group promoted the album through appearances in the Coachella Valley Music and Arts Festival and Panorama Fest in New York City.

Their song "Moments" was featured in the 2014 video game Forza Horizon 2, on the in-game Innovative Leisure radio station and in the 2015 film Paper Towns. "Cool Up" was featured in FIFA 21 and the bestselling video game Forza Horizon 5.

== Discography ==
=== Studio albums ===
- Voyage (2014)
- Generation (2015)
- More Disco Songs About Love (2018)
- Do You Need A Release? (2022)

=== Extended plays ===
- More Disco Covers About Love (2018)
- In Betweens (2020)
- Uneven (2021)
- Love Is Hard Work (2024)

=== Collaborations ===
- "In These Fine Times" (with Classixx) (2016)
- "Power Struggle" (with Hanni El Khatib) (2019)
