= Hanni El Khatib =

American singer-songwriter (born 1981)

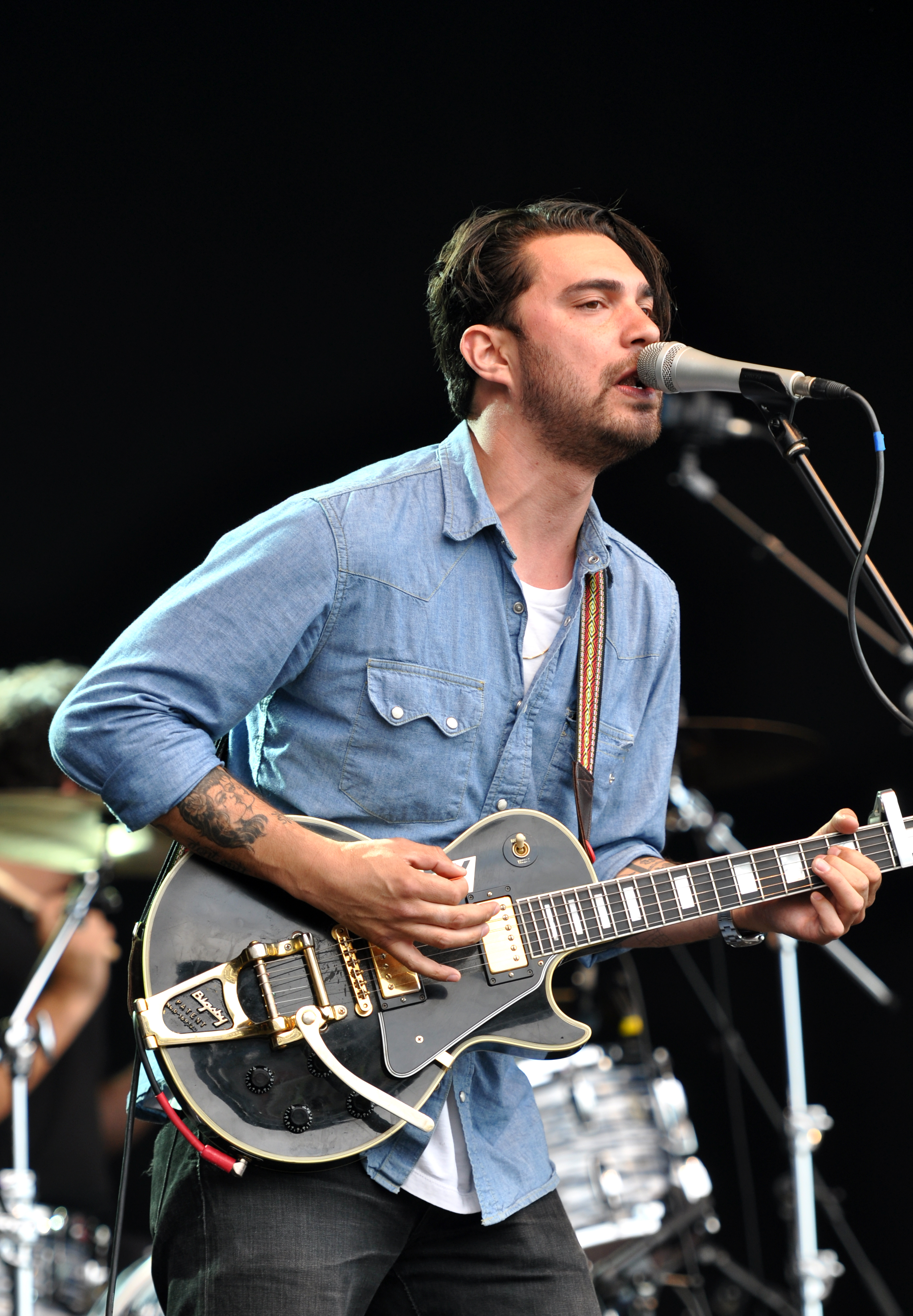
- Hanni El Khatib at Rock am Ring, Germany, 2013

Background information
- Also known as: Cills, Logic, Street Price
- Born: June 8, 1981 (age 45); San Francisco, California, United States
- Genres: Rock, blues rock
- Occupations: Musician, songwriter, producer
- Instruments: Vocals, guitar
- Years active: 2010–present
- Website: hannielkhatib.com

Hanni El Khatib (born June 8, 1981) is an American singer-songwriter, and multi-instrumentalist, and producer. He is also the visual director and co-owner of Los Angeles–based independent record label Innovative Leisure. His 2013 sophomore full-length Head in the Dirt was produced by the Black Keys' Dan Auerbach. His album Moonlight was released on January 20, 2015. He was described by The Guardian as a "former skate-punk raised on vintage rock and R&B [who] is keeping the spirit of 76 alive with his primal raunch 'n' roll."

== Biography ==
Hanni El Khatib, a first-generation American, was raised in San Francisco, California, by a Palestinian father and a Filipino mother. He grew up skateboarding and listening to 60s soul, surf music, doo-wop and British invasion bands like the Beatles and the Zombies. He took piano lessons as a child and learned to play the guitar between age 11 and 12. He attended art school but dropped out before graduating.

While employed as creative director for streetwear label HUF, he recorded himself singing and playing acoustic guitar as a hobby. He spent a year recording his songs with electric guitar and drums at the suggestion of friend and studio engineer Marc Bianchi of Her Space Holiday. After participating in a 2009 art show in San Francisco, he began circulating a homemade CDR of his music, one of which he gave to Innovative Leisure label co-founder Jamie Strong.

== Musical career ==
He was signed to Innovative Leisure in 2010. His debut was the 7" vinyl single "Dead Wrong," released on September 21, 2010, backed with a cover of the 1931 song "You Rascal You" most famously recorded by Louis Armstrong. His second 7" vinyl single "Build. Destroy. Rebuild." b/w "Loved One" was released on November 3, 2010. During this time, he would perform live and begin touring extensively, including a tour with Florence and the Machine, as a duo with drummer and longtime friend Nicky Fleming-Yaryan. He quickly developed a substantial audience.

His debut album, Will the Guns Come Out, was released on Innovative Leisure on September 27, 2011. It was described by the Los Angeles Times as "a taut, muscular collection of rock ‘n’ roll" and by The Guardian as "if Joe Strummer came back as an angry young Filipino-Palestinian American." Much of this record consisted of the tracks recorded with Bianchi.

The album's final track "I Got A Thing," a cover of the 1970 Funkadelic single "I Got A Thing…" that was recorded by Josh Marcy, reached more than 2 million YouTube views in August 2011. It was licensed for a Nike advertising campaign to serve as what NPR called a "modern surf, skate and all-around shredding anthem." In the spring of 2012, El Khatib added a keyboard/organ player to his touring band to better recreate the sound of his album. In 2012, El Khatib met Black Keys’ frontman Dan Auerbach by chance in a bar during a shared DJ set in Paris. Later that year he recorded his second album Head In The Dirt in three weeks at Auerbach's Nashville studio Easy Eye. It was released on Innovative Leisure on April 30, 2013, and was described as "desert-burned blues rock boosted by punk, soul and hip-hop – music that has a retro heart but couldn't have been made before 2013" by Rolling Stone. Its track "Can't Win 'Em All" was featured in a popular Audi commercial that ran during Super Bowl XLVII and was reported to have reached 114 million Americans.

In 2014, El Khatib spent 30 days recording his third full-length Moonlight with drummer Ron Marinelli and engineer Sonni DiPerri at Los Angeles studio The Lair. With the exception of drums, El Khatib played most of the instruments on Moonlight himself and also sampled and edited Marinelli's drums. Moonlight also includes a field recording of a funeral procession, recorded by El Khatib during a skateboarding trip through a Mexican village. A remix of the title track featuring Wu-Tang Clan member GZA was released on November 18, 2014. Moonlight was released on Innovative Leisure on January 20, 2015. Clash Music described it as "a curious oddity" that "indicates that there’s far more to Hanni El Khatib than meets the eye."

In the fall of 2015, a Paris performance by El Khatib was cancelled after the Bataclan attack. He used the unexpected space in his schedule for studio sessions at the Jazzcats recording studio in Long Beach, described by Buzzbands LA as a "second home" where he and producer Jonny Bell worked writing and recording new material.

The first track from these sessions was "Baby’s OK," described by El Khatib as "completely improvised and was a total stream of consciousness lyrically and musically" and premiered in April 2016 by The Fader magazine. The second song "Gonna Die Alone" premiered in April 2016 on Zane Lowe's Beats 1 radio show. On April 29, 2016, El Khatib announced the first of five Savage Times EPs, releasing digitally on Innovative Leisure as they were completed and culminating in the Savage Times album, collecting the 21 tracks from the digital EPs for physical release on February 17, 2017. A reviewer for Clash Music said "it might well be his most creative document to date" and Mass Appeal reported that "as an already talented multi-instrumentalist, Hanni delivered on our high hopes."

== In popular culture ==
Hanni El Khatib's music has been used in television commercials for Converse, Captain Morgan, Applebee's, Sky Atlantic, Nike, Nissan, Levi's, T-Mobile and Apple.

His music was used in the USA Network series Suits, HBO series Hung, Netflix series Death By Lightning and Grace & Frankie, the Showtime series Californication and United States of Tara, the CBS series Elementary, the BBC series Luther and the feature film For a Good Time, Call.... The song "Build. Destroy. Rebuild." was used in the episode "Charity Case" of the series House. His song "Can't Win 'Em All" was used for the controversial Audi ad broadcast during the 2013 Super Bowl. "Come Alive" was used in the 2013 horror film Carrie. "Family" was used in NHL 14 and in the episode "Welcome Back, Jim" of the series Gotham (2015). His song “Gonna Die Alone” was also used in the 2023 Netflix series “Fubar” starring Arnold Schwarzenegger.

Hanni El Khatib played himself as the DJ of Innovative Leisure Radio in Forza Horizon 2. Three of his songs also played on the station: "Head In the Dirt", "Family", and "Pay No Mind".

The song "Save Me" was also featured on the NBC show The Blacklist, season 2, episode 19: "Leonard Caul" on April 23, 2015.

"Gonna Die Alone" was featured in the closing credits for the first-season finale of the television series Loudermilk.

The song "Alive" was featured in the 2024 movie Tarot.

== Discography ==
=== Albums ===
Year	Album	Peak positions		
Year	Album	US Heatseekers Albums	US Independent Albums	FRA
2011	Will the Guns Come Out	46	—	111
2013	Head in the Dirt	8	46	35
2015	Moonlight	15	—	55
2017	Savage Times	—	—	79
2020	FLIGHT	—	—	—

=== Singles ===
Year	Album	Peak positions	Notes
Year	Album	FRA	Notes
2010	"Dead Wrong"	—	Will the Guns Come Out
2010	"Build. Destroy. Rebuild."	—	Will the Guns Come Out
