= Poolside (band) =

American band

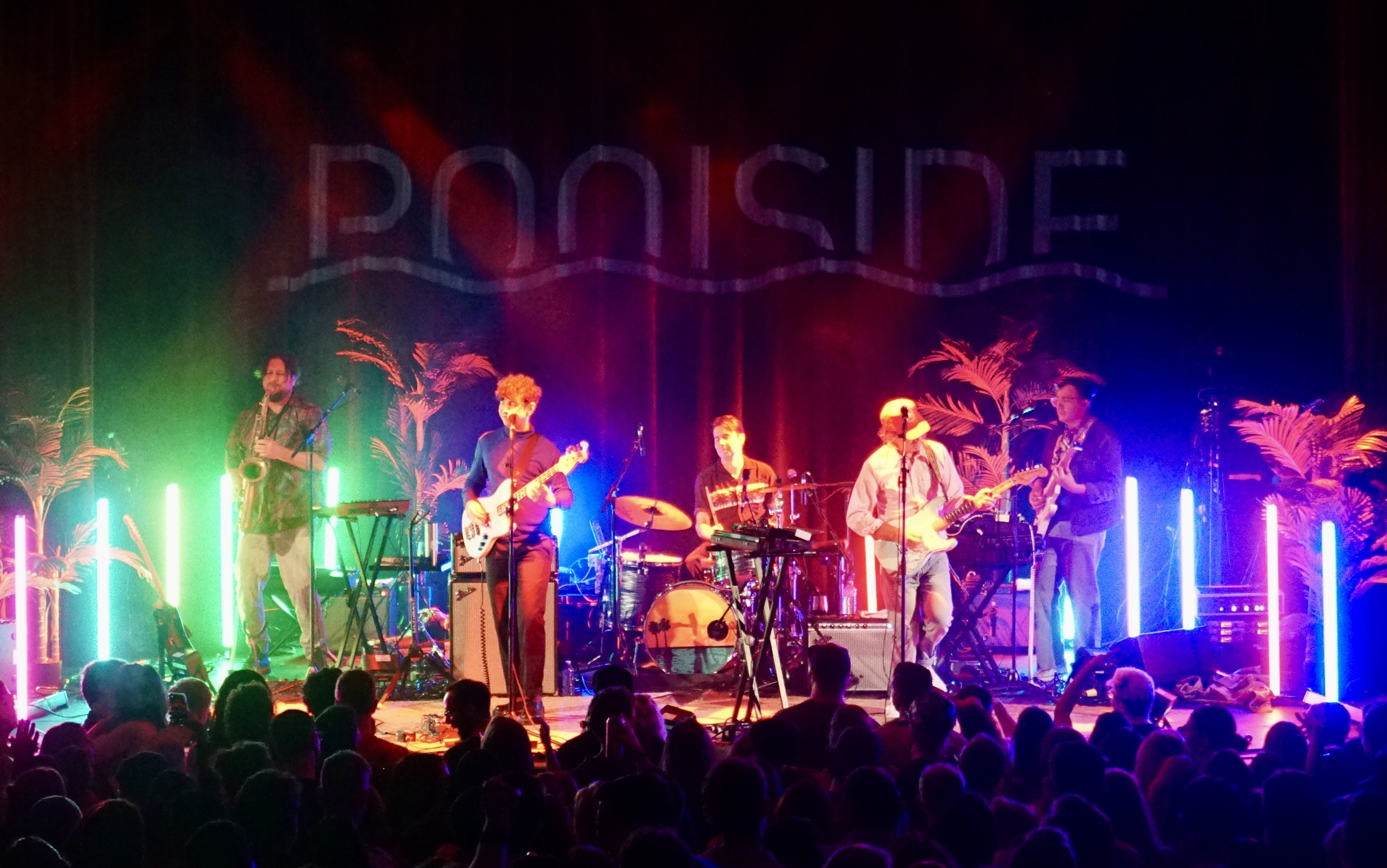
- Poolside performing in 2024

Background information
- Origin: Los Angeles, California, U.S.
- Genres: Nu-disco, chillwave, synthpop
- Years active: 2011–present
- Label: Pacific Standard Records
- Members: Jeffrey Paradise
- Past members: Filip Nikolic
- Website: poolsidemusic.com

Poolside is an American nu-disco and chillwave band from Los Angeles, California, formed in 2011 by Jeffrey Paradise and Filip Nikolic (Nikolic left the project in 2017). The band currently consists of Jeffrey Paradise with additional touring members of Vito Roccoforte (the Rapture), Mattie Safer (the Rapture), Alton Allen, and Casey Butler (Pharaohs).

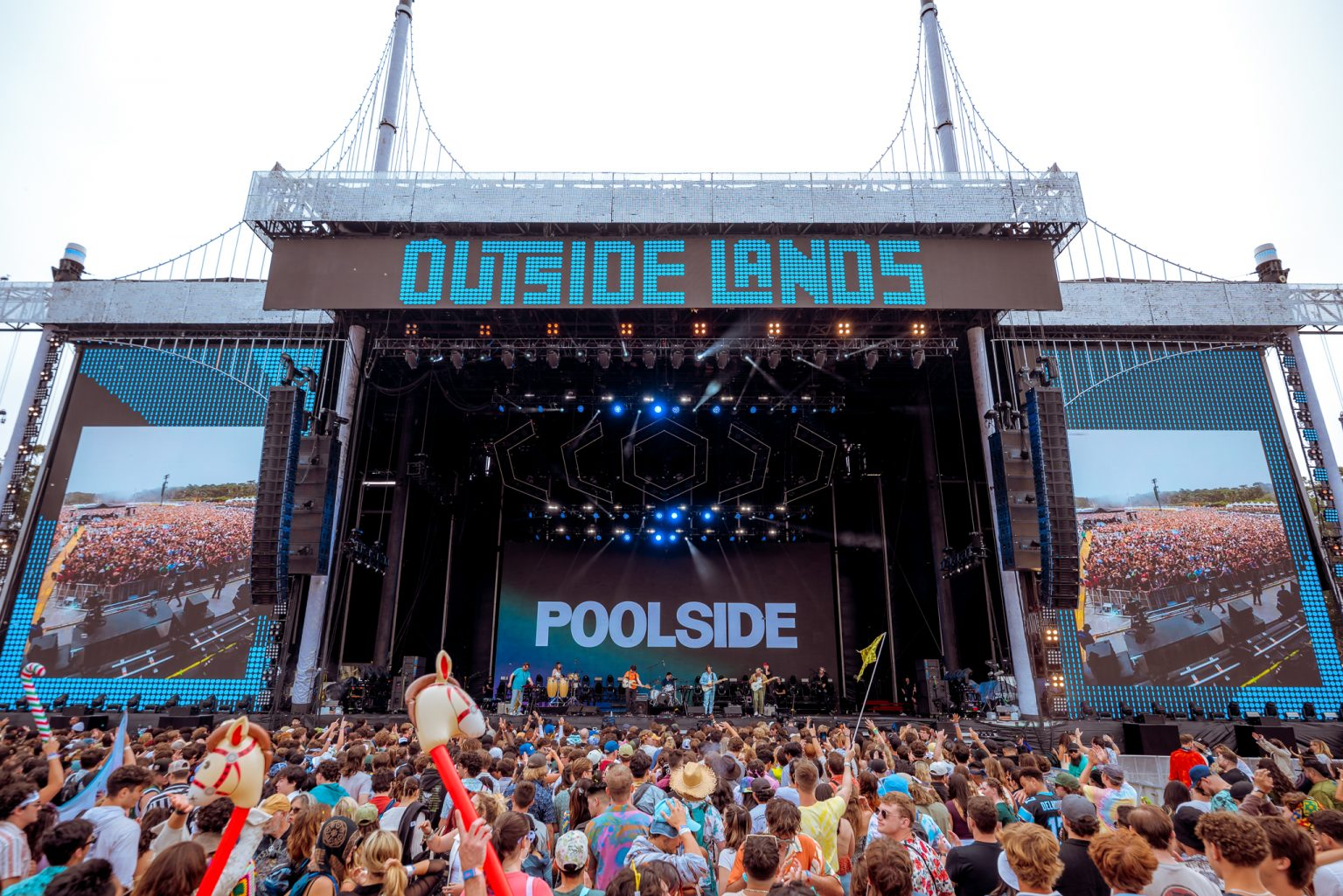
Poolside playing the Lands End stage at Outside Lands (2023)

The band has performed at high-profile festivals like FYF (2013), Primavera Sound (2013), and Coachella (2014). Poolside took a four-year break from touring, before returning in 2018 with their current lineup. And, have since toured the US and performed at festivals like Outside Lands (2018, 2023), Okeechobee (2018), Austin City Limits Music Festival (2023), Lollapalooza (2023) and Life Is Beautiful (2018) in support of their sophomore record Heat (2017). Poolside released their third record Low Season on February 7, 2020, followed soon after by its companion record High Season on May 28, 2021.

The band produces a specific version of nu-disco, which they refer to as "daytime disco", the style known for relaxed beats, high vocals and a wash of smooth electronics and the lounge sound overall.

As a solo DJ Jeffrey Paradise, under the Poolside (DJ Set) moniker, has carved out a place as an in-demand remixer. Most notably, with official remixes of Modest Mouse, Billy Idol, Jim James, L'Impératrice, Little Dragon, Tycho (musician), Matthew Dear, and others.

== History ==
=== Formation & early years (2004-2011) ===
In 2004, San Francisco DJ Jeffrey Paradise met Filip Nikolic (at the time bassist for Junior Senior) at Frisco Disco, one of Paradise's parties in San Francisco. Nikolic then spent time touring with Paradise Boys, a collaboration between Jeffrey Paradise and Bertie Pearson. A year later Nikolic came out to Los Angeles for a few months and the two gathered together in the studio to make a few songs. In 2006, the duo set out to make a disco influenced project; however, they were busy with other projects and their work “never got too serious.”

Poolside's debut single "Do You Believe" was released in 2011 and positively received by peers Todd Terje, Dimitri From Paris, and The Magician, and Dazed & Confused praised the song for its "pop-tinged disco, brimming with optimistic vocals and retro acid synths," while NME lauded its "supremely casual decadence." Later in 2011 LCD Soundsystem frontman James Murphy put Poolside into greater public notoriety by frequently incorporating their cover of Neil Young's "Harvest Moon" into his DJ sets.

The duo released their second single, “Take Me Home” in October 2011, followed by a video released on Scion Audio Visual in November 2011. The song was used as the first song on Aeroplane's In Flight Entertainment compilation.

=== Pacific Standard Time (2012) ===
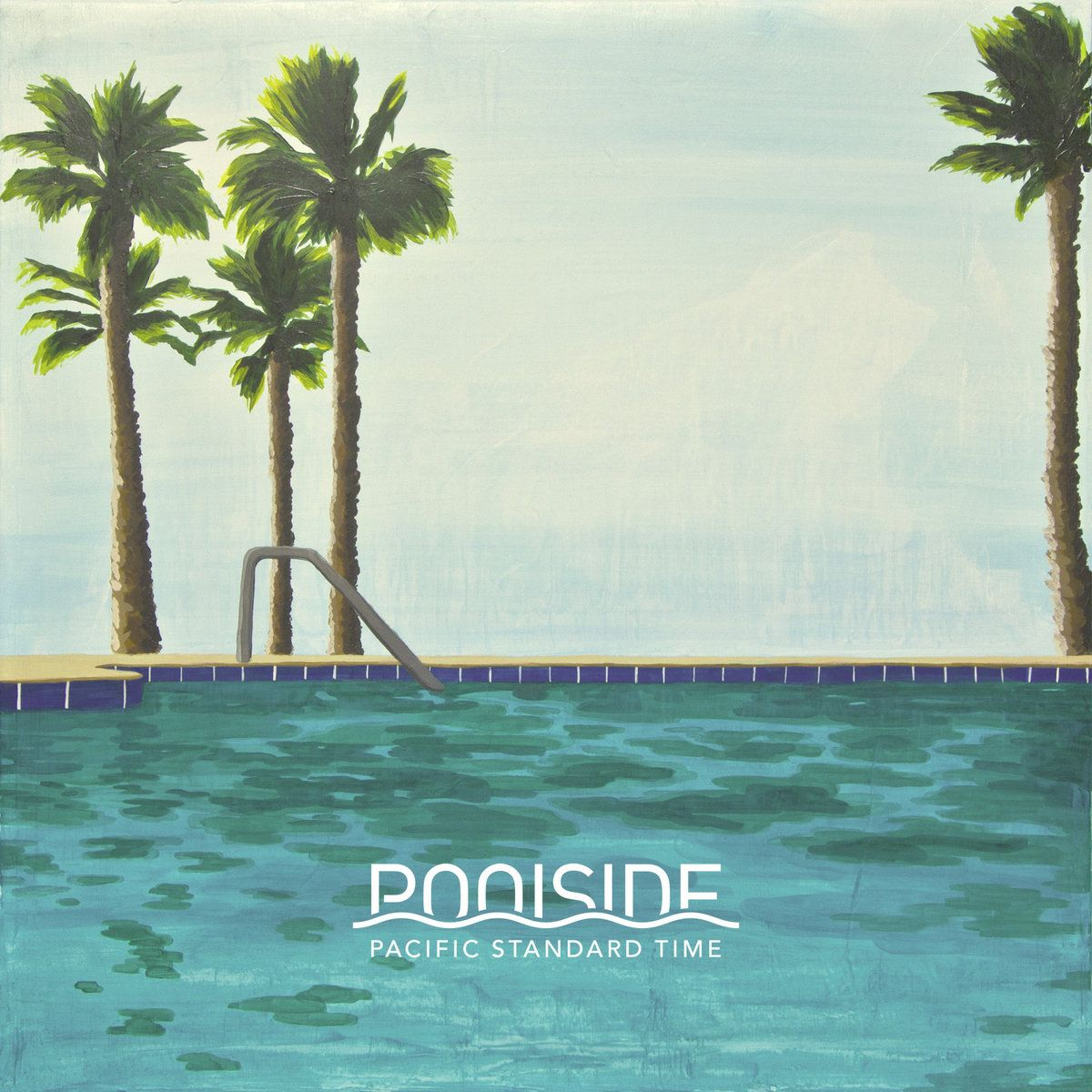
Album artwork for Pacific Standard Time' (2012)

On July 9, 2012, Poolside released their debut album Pacific Standard Time. The album was put together with no serious goal in mind, only to make groovy, daytime disco. Album track "Slow Down" was named "Best New Track" by Pitchfork, and Pitchfork called the album "a disco album that slinks along with the urgency of a teenager on the first day of summer vacation."

=== Heat (2017) ===
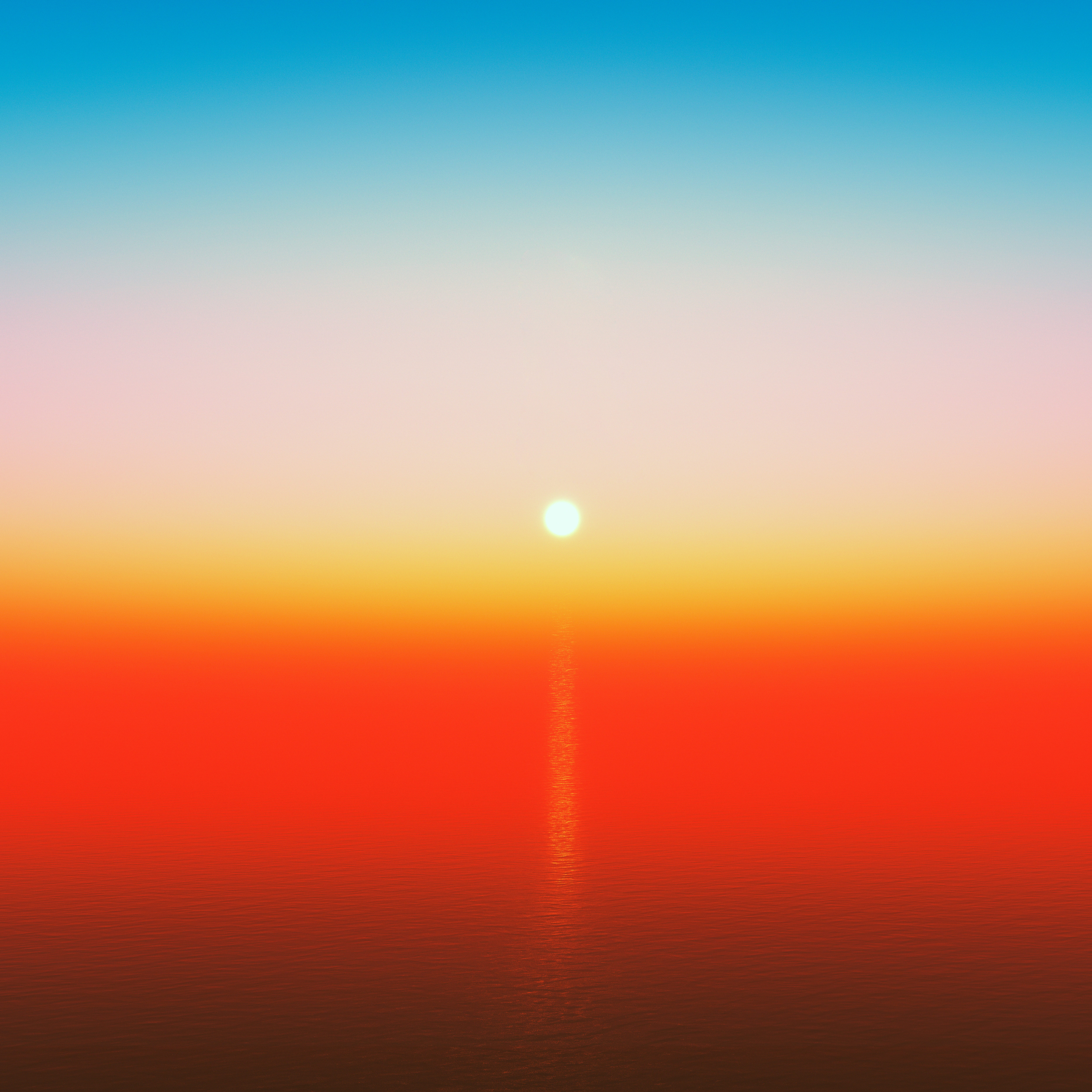
Album artwork for Heat (2017) Art by Neil Krug

On June 20, 2017, Poolside released their second album Heat. On Heat, the band "kept the same core ideas and expanded the pallet [they] worked with – the instruments, percussions, tempos, sounds, etc – but [they] definitely turned up the heat a bit more on some songs with more upbeat tempos, spread out into some more lush electronic vibes, and [they] didn’t shy away from our more guitar based influences that were mostly hiding on the first album." The band performed album track "Everything Goes" for the first time at Outside Lands in San Francisco on August 11, 2018.

=== Low Season (2020) ===
On February 7, 2020, Poolside released their third album, Low Season. It was preceded by the singles "Can't Stop Your Lovin' (feat. Panama)" and "Around The Sun (feat. Amo Amo)", the latter of which was named a "Song You Need To Know" by Rolling Stone. Low Season is the first Poolside album produced solely by Jeffrey Paradise following the departure of Filip Nikolic in 2017. In 2020, Poolside also released a cover of the Grateful Dead's "Shakedown Street" to mark the 25th anniversary of Jerry Garcia's passing.

=== High Season (2021) ===
On May 28, 2021, Poolside released their fourth album, High Season. The album features collaborators such as L'Impératrice, DRAMA, Todd Edwards, Miami Horror, and NEIL FRANCES.

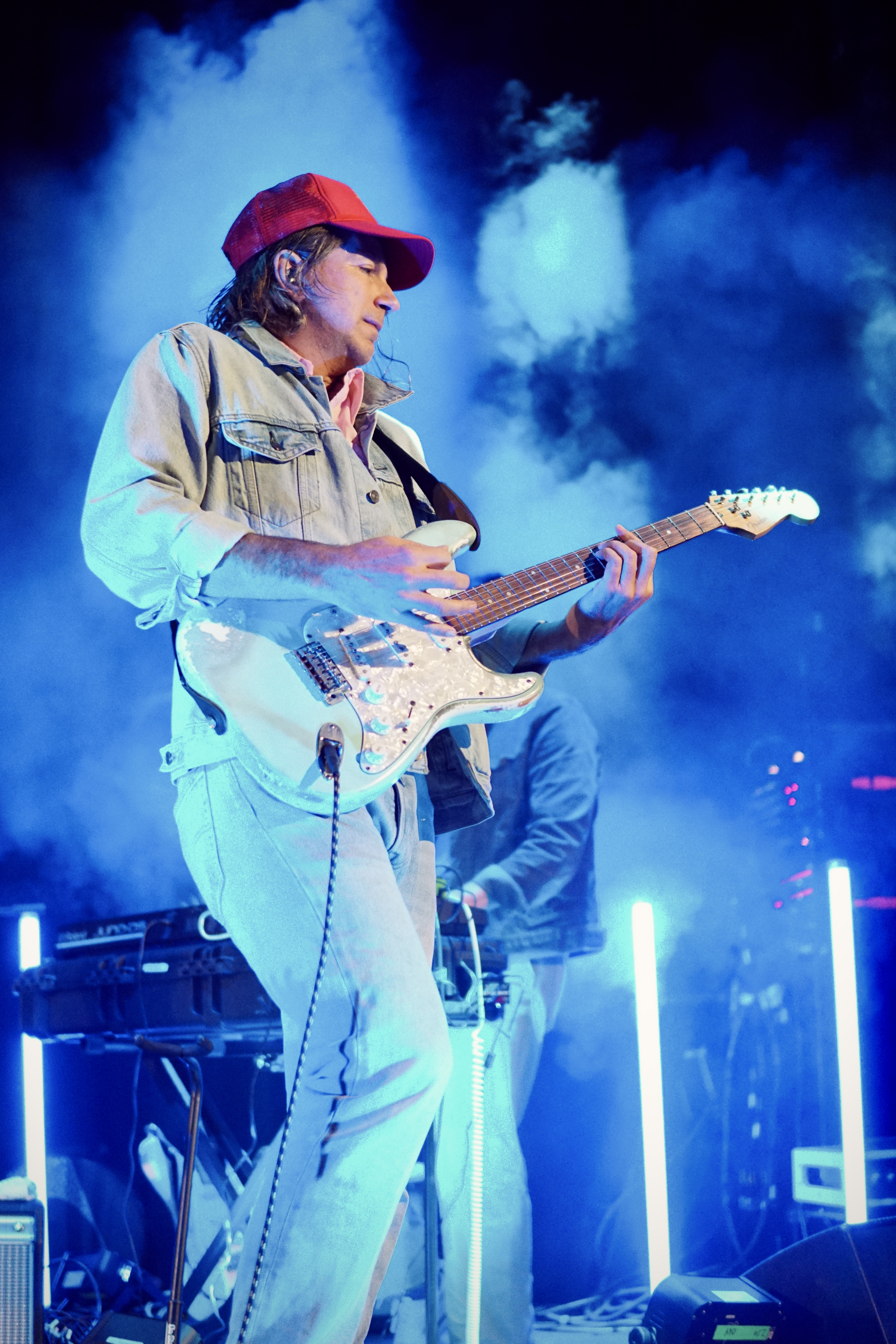
Jeffrey Paradise performing alongside Poolside in 2024

=== Blame It All On Love (2023) ===
Poolside's 2023 album, Blame It All On Love, marked the debut album release on Ninja Tune imprint Counter Records Anchored by features from Munya, Panama, Vansire, Slenderbodies, Mazy, Ora the Molecule, and Life On Planets, this album was described by American Songwriter as "a nighttime cruise, riding out any regrets through some yacht-rock and funk-lit plays around stories of multi-dimensional ideas of love."

== Discography ==
=== Albums ===
- Pacific Standard Time (2012)
- Heat (2017)
- Low Season (2020)
- Blame It All on Love (2023)

=== Remix albums ===
- High Season (2021)

=== Mixtapes ===
- Day & Night (2011)
- Night People (2011)
- Fall Back (2012)
- Seasons Change (2012)
- Stir It Up (2014)
- Contact High (2016)

=== Singles and EPs ===
- "Do You Believe" (2011), Future Classic
- "Take Me Home" (In-Flight Entertainment compilation) (2011), Eskimo / N.E.W.S.
- "Scion A/V Presents: Poolside - Only Everything" (2012)
- "If We Make It" (2015)
- "And the Sea" (July 20, 2016)
- "Everything Goes" (2017)
- "Feel Alright" (2018)
- "Which Way to Paradise (Remixes)" (2018)
- "Can't Stop Your Lovin'" (featuring Panama) (2019)
- "Greatest City" (2019)
- "Around the Sun" (featuring Amo Amo) (2020)
- "Getting There from Here" (with Todd Edwards) (2020)
- "Shakedown Street" (Grateful Dead cover) (2020)
- "I'm in Love with You" (with Neil Frances) (2020)
- "I Feel High" (with DRAMA) (2021)
- "Lamb's Wool" (with Foster the People) (2021)

=== Remixes ===
- The Rapture - "In the Grace of Your Love (Poolside Remix)" (2012)
- Matthew Dear - "Her Fantasy (Poolside Remix)" (2012)
- Laid Back - "Fly Away (Poolside Edit)" (2012)
- Black Sabbath – "Planet Caravan (Poolside Rework)"
- Neil Young - "Harvest Moon (Poolside cover)"
- Sade - "When Am I Going to Make a Living (Poolside Edit)" (2012)
- Cassiano - "Onda (Poolside & Fatnotronic Edit)"
- Little Dragon - "Cat Rider (Poolside Remix)"
- Fool's Gold - "I'm in Love (Poolside Remix)"
- The Pool - "Jamaica Running (Poolside Edit)"
- Zoé - "Andrómeda (Poolside Remix)" (2015)
- James Curd - "Alien (Poolside Mix)" (2015)
- Evinha - "Esperar Pra Ver (Poolside & Fatnotronic Edit)" (2016)
- Bohannon - "Save Their Souls (Poolside Edit)" (2016)
- Delegation - "Oh Honey (Poolside Edit)" (2016)
- Le Pamplemousse - "Gimmie What You Got (Poolside Edit)" (2016)
- The Rascals - "Groovin on a Sunday Afternoon (Poolside Edit)" (2016)
- Miami Horror - "Leila (Poolside Remix)" (2017)
- David Byrne - "Strange Overtones (Poolside cover)" (2017)
- Tycho - "Horizon (Poolside Remix)" (2018)
- Rhye - "Feel Your Weight (Poolside Remix)" (2018)
- Big Wild - "Touch (Poolside Remix)" (2020)
- L'Impératrice - "Fou (Poolside Remix)" (2020)
- Billy Idol - "Eyes Without a Face (Poolside Remix)" (2021)
