= Panama (band) =

Australian electronica band

- Origin: Sydney, Australia
- Genres: Electronic, alternative dance, indie pop
- Years active: 2010–present
- Labels: Future Classic, 300 Entertainment
- Spinoff of: The Dirty Secrets
- Members: Jarrah McCleary; Tim Commandeur; Tom Marland
- Website: panamamusic.co

Panama is an electronic musical project from Sydney, Australia. Panama formed after Jarrah McCleary's previous band, The Dirty Secrets came to an end. Panama has allowed McCleary to experiment musically and develop a more electronic, house influenced style.

Panama has seen band members come and go, but is spearheaded by Jarrah McCleary (lead vocals, keyboard, guitar), Tim Commandeur (drums) and Tom Marland (keyboard, guitar). Panama's second EP Always (2014) nabbed the band spots on BBC Radio 1, Triple J's iconic Hottest 100 and has had millions of plays on SoundCloud.

The band recorded an EP in Los Angeles and embarked on tours around the world including playing at SXSW in 2014 and Primavera Festival in 2015.

In 2015, Panama partnered with iconic swimwear brand, Seafolly, to featuring the brands latest designs in the music video for their single, "Stay Forever".

In 2020, the EP Always was certified platinum in Australia.

== Discography ==
=== Extended plays ===
| Title | EP details | Certification |
|---|---|---|
| It's Not Over | Released: 2 November 2012; Label: Future Classic (FCL79); Format: CD, Digital download, 12" | |
| Always | Released: 3 October 2013; Label: Future Classic (FCL98); Format: CD, Digital download, 12" | ARIA: Platinum |
| Hope for Something | Released: 24 June 2017; Label: Future Classic; Format: Digital download | |

=== Singles ===
==== As lead artist ====
| Year | Title | Album |
|---|---|---|
| 2012 | "It's Not Over" | It's Not Over |
| 2012 | "Magic" | It's Not Over |
| 2012 | "Money King" (with Jazzyst) | non album single |
| 2013 | "We Have Love" | It's Not Over |
| 2013 | "How We Feel" | Always |
| 2013 | "Always" | Always |
| 2014 | "Strange Feeling" | Always (Deluxe Edition) |
| 2014 | "Stay Forever" | non album singles |
| 2015 | "Jungle" | non album singles |
| 2017 | "Hope for Something" | Hope for Something |
| 2017 | "Undertow" | Hope for Something |
| 2019 | "Can't Stop Your Lovin'" (with Poolside) | non album singles |
| 2019 | "More Than Friends" (with Andrey Azizov) | non album singles |
| 2019 | "Drive" (with OTR) | non album singles |

==== As featured artist ====
| Year | Title | Album |
|---|---|---|
| 2017 | "Waterfall" (Petit Biscuit featuring Panama) | Presence |
| 2018 | "People I Know" (Boobox Cartel featuring Panama) | TBA |
| 2018 | "Wildflowers" (Zimmer featuring Panama) | TBA |
| 2019 | "Hollow" (Hounded featuring Panama) | TBA |
| 2019 | "Automatic" (Satin Jackets featuring Panama) | Solar Nights |
| 2019 | "Between Us (feat. Panama)" (Hayden James) | Between Us |
| 2021 | "Weightless" (Ben Böhmer & Panama) | Weightless - Single |
| 2021 | "Rolling Back" (TWO LANES & Panama) | Reflections |
| 2022 | "Fade Into Black" (Tinlicker and Panama) | Fade Into Black - Single |
| 2022 | "Far Behind" (Nils Hoffmann featuring Panama) | A Radiant Sign |
| 2022 | "New Love (feat. Panama)" (Le Youth & Sultan + Shepard) | Reminders |
| 2023 | "Left Behind" (TWO LANES & Panama) | Duality |
| 2024 | "Don't Let Go" (Keanler & Panama) | ABGT 602 |
| 2024 | "Love Come Through" (LP Giobbi & Panama) | Dotr |
| 2024 | "Control" (Cristoph, Panama & Tigerblind) | Control - Single |
| 2025 | "Nowhere to Hide" (Massane & Panama) | Nowhere to Hide - Single |
