= Innovative Leisure =

American record label

- Founded: 2010; 16 years ago
- Founder: Nate Nelson, Jamie Strong, Hanni El Khatib
- Distributor: Redeye Distribution
- Genre: Alternative rock, indie rock, pop, electronic, jazz, punk rock
- Country of origin: United States
- Location: Los Angeles, California
- Official website: www.innovativeleisure.net

Innovative Leisure is a Los Angeles-based record label founded in 2010 by Nate Nelson, Jamie Strong, and Hanni El Khatib. Its genre-spanning roster is anchored by artists including BadBadNotGood, Classixx, De Lux, Hanni El Khatib, Nick Waterhouse, and Tijuana Panthers. Notable alumni include garage rock bands Allah-Las, Bass Drum of Death, and The Buttertones, Thai psych rock ensemble Khun Narin, and producers Nosaj Thing and Jim-E Stack.

== History ==
Innovative Leisure was founded in early 2010 by Nate Nelson and Jamie Strong, formerly of Stones Throw Records, in partnership with musician and former Creative Director of HUF Hanni El Khatib. At first a side project of Nelson and Strong, the label's first releases were physical singles by artists including Mexicans with Guns and Freddie Gibbs, followed by albums by Lazer Sword and Hanni El Khatib. The label found momentum after signing Nick Waterhouse and Allah-Las, and releasing Rhye's first single, "Open," in 2012; the band's contract was subsequently signed to Universal.

In 2013, the label signed instrumental group BadBadNotGood and electronic duo Classixx, and released a series of albums and singles during the mid-2010s by these groups as well as artists including Bass Drum of Death, Crystal Antlers, and Tijuana Pathers. The label released Jim-E Stack's debut album in 2014. In 2017, it put out a compilation iL Loosies: B-Sides, Remixes and other Rarities.

The label has been nominated for the Libera Award for Label of the Year nearly every year since 2014. In 2016, Innovative Leisure was one of the 21 labels nominated for the IMPALA FIVEUNDERFIFTEEN campaign shining a light on the most inspiring young labels. The label received the IMPALA Young Label Spotlight Award. The label celebrated its tenth anniversary in 2020.

== Artist roster ==
As of June 2026.

=== Current ===
- Alex Maas
- Allah-Las
- Arjuna Oakes and Serebii
- BadBadNotGood
- Bambii
- Ben Marc
- Charlie Vettuno
- Claude Fontaine
- dadá Joãozinho
- De Lux
- Gelli Haha
- Hanni El Khatib
- Iguana Death Cult
- J-E-T-S
- Jimmy Edgar
- Jonah Yano
- L’Eclair
- Leland Whitty
- Mapache
- Maria Chiara Argirò
- Nick Waterhouse
- Peel
- Sam Blasucci
- Serebii
- Tijuana Panthers
- Tim Hill
- Wahid

=== Alumni ===
- Bass Drum of Death
- The Buttertones
- Classixx
- Crystal Antlers
- Dendrons
- Feeding People
- Gossamer
- Harriet Brown
- Holy Fuck
- Jim-E Stack
- Khun Narin
- Korey Dane
- Lazer Sword
- Lionel Boy
- Maston
- Mexicans with Guns
- Mint Field
- Mirror Tree
- The Molochs
- Nosaj Thing
- Pinky Pinky
- Rarelyalways
- Ric Wilson
- Rhye
- Superhumanoids
- Tropics
- Vicktor Taiwò
- Wall of Death

Innovative Leisure has also released singles by artists including Freddie Gibbs, Machinedrum, Nguzunguzu, WeBreakCameras, Two Eights, Death Boner, Isles, El Niño & The Southern Oscillations, OTTO FIX, Traps PS, and BAMBII, among others.
