= DJ Drama discography =

Hip hop disc jockey discography

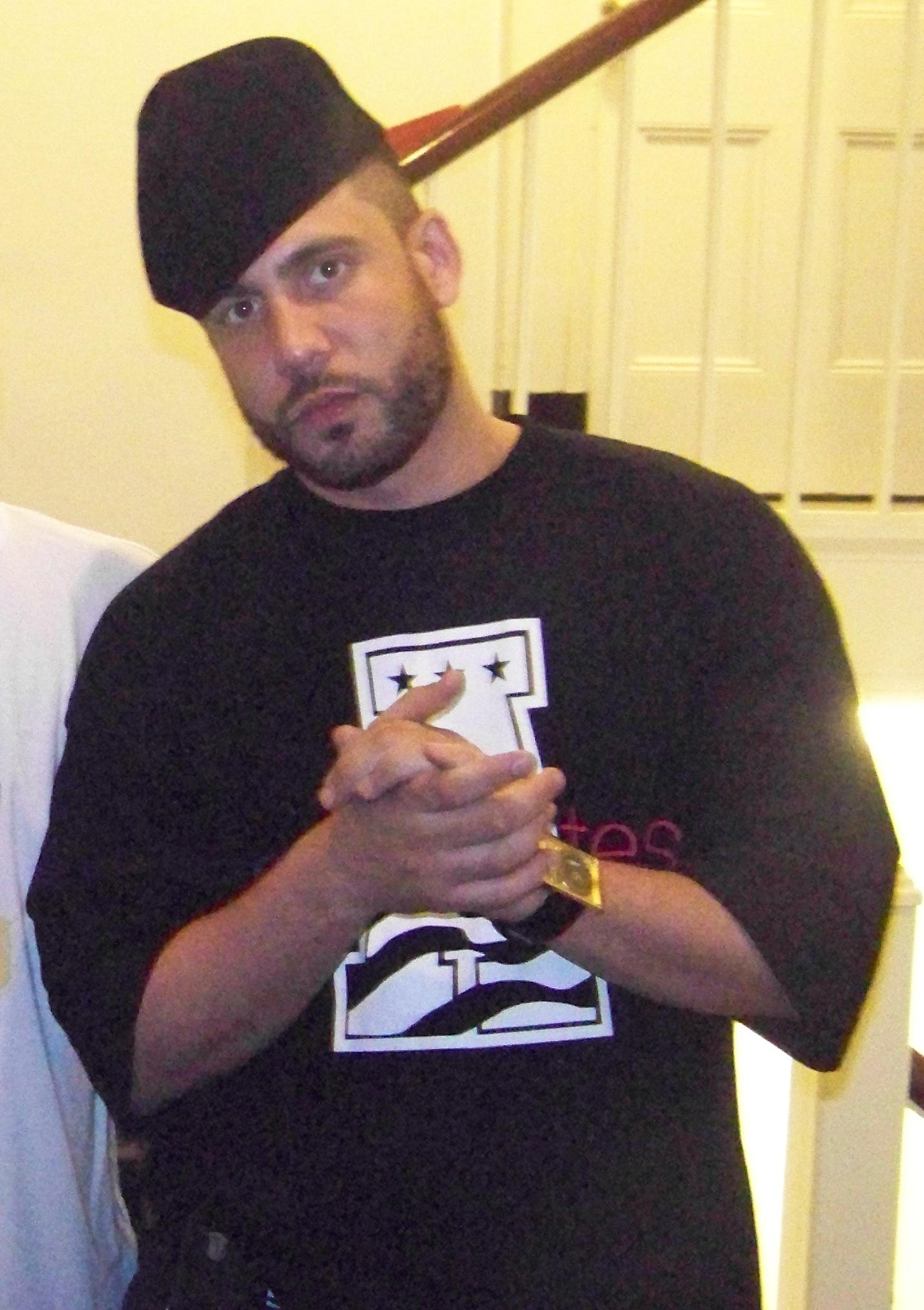
- DJ Drama In 2008
- Studio albums: 6
- Singles: 6
- Music videos: 10

The discography of American disc jockey DJ Drama consists of six independent studio albums. His first, Gangsta Grillz: The Album, was released in December 2007 and spawned two singles: "5000 Ones" (featuring Nelly, T.I., Yung Joc, Willie the Kid, Jeezy, Diddy and Twista) and "The Art of Storytellin' Part 4" (featuring OutKast and Marsha Ambrosius). Two years later, he released his second album Gangsta Grillz: The Album (Vol. 2) (2009), which likewise spawned two singles: "Day Dreaming" (featuring Akon, Snoop Dogg and T.I.) and "Ridiculous" (featuring Gucci Mane, Yo Gotti, Lonnie Mac and OJ da Juiceman)—both of which failed to chart domestically.

His third album, Third Power (2011) was his first not to be released in the Gangsta Grillz series; its lead single, "Oh My" (featuring Fabolous, Roscoe Dash and Wiz Khalifa) marked his first entry on the Billboard Hot 100. His fourth album, Quality Street Music (2012) saw further success with its singles "So Many Girls" (featuring Roscoe Dash, Tyga and Wale) and "My Moment" (featuring 2 Chainz, Meek Mill and Jeremih), which peaked at numbers 90 and 89 on the chart, respectively. His fifth, Quality Street Music 2 (2015) was led by the single "Wishing" (featuring Chris Brown, Skeme and LyQuin), which peaked at number 77 on the chart and remains his highest-charting song.

== Studio albums ==
List of albums, with selected chart positions.
Title	Album details	Peak chart positions		
Title	Album details	US	US R&B /HH	US Rap
I Told U So (with Yo Gotti)	Released: November 6, 2006; Label: 101 Distribution; Format: CD, digital download	—	—	—
Gangsta Grillz: The Album	Released: December 4, 2007; Label: Grand Hustle, Atlantic Records; Format: CD, digital download	26	3	2
There Is No Competition (with Fabolous)	Released: February 13, 2008; Label: Street Family; Format: digital download	—	—	—
The City Is In Good Hands (with Snoop Dogg)	Released: July 4, 2008; Label: Self-released; Format: CD, digital download	—	—	—
Gangsta Grillz: The Album (Vol. 2)	Released: May 19, 2009; Label: Grand Hustle, Atlantic Records; Format: CD, digital download	26	5	4
Cocaine Konvicts (with French Montana)	Released: September 25, 2009; Label: Cocaine City Records; Format: digital download	—	—	—
There Is No Competition 2: The Funeral Service (with Fabolous)	Released: March 5, 2010; Label: Desert Storm, Def Jam; Format: digital download	—	—	—
Third Power	Released: October 11, 2011; Label: eOne Music, Aphilliates Records, Powerhouse Productions; Format: CD, digital download	42	7	6
There Is No Competition 3: Death Comes in 3's (with Fabolous)	Released: December 25, 2011; Label: Desert Storm, Def Jam; Format: digital download	—	—	—
Quality Street Music	Released: October 2, 2012; Label: eOne Music, Aphilliates Records, Powerhouse Productions; Format: CD, digital download	15	5	2
Quality Street Music 2	Released: July 22, 2016; Label: eOne Music, Aphilliates Records, Powerhouse Productions; Format: CD, digital download	40	6	5
It's tha World	Released: May 24, 2018; Label: Self-released; Format: CD, digital download	—	—	—
12 AM in Atlanta 2 (with 24hrs)	Released: April 10, 2020; Label: Private Club, Rostrum; Format: CD, digital download	—	—	—
Fame Or Feds 3 (with Hardo & Deezlee)	Released: July 23, 2021; Label: SinceThe80s, LLC; Format: CD, digital download	—	—	—
What Would Big Do 2021 (with Fat Joe)	Released: August 13, 2021; Label: Self-released; Format: CD, digital download	—	—	—
Gangsta Grillz: We Set the Trends (with Jim Jones)	Released: January 14, 2022; Label: Vamplife, EMPIRE; Format: CD, digital download	—	—	—
The World Is Yours: Gangsta Grillz (with Badda TD)	Released: July 8, 2022; Label: Epic Records; Format: Streaming, digital download	—	—	—
Misguided (with OMB Peezy)	Released: August 19, 2022; Label: Overkill Ent., 300; Format: Streaming, digital download	—	—	—
Results Take Time (with Symba)	Released: September 16, 2022; Label: Starr Island, Atlantic Records; Format: Streaming, digital download	—	—	—
Gangsta Grillz: I Still Got It (with Snoop Dogg)	Released: October 20, 2022; Label: Death Row; Format: Streaming, digital download	—	—	—
Snofall (with Jeezy)	Released: October 21, 2022; Label: YJ Music Inc., Def Jam; Format: Streaming, digital download	9	4	3
God Save the Rave (with David Sabastian)	Released: November 11, 2022; Label: Believe In Yourself Records, Warner Records; Format: Streaming, digital download	—	—	—
Book of David (with Dave East & Buda & Grandz)	Released: November 18, 2022; Label: From the Dirt; Format: Streaming, digital download	—	—	—
Paint the City (with Icewear Vezzo)	Released: December 8, 2022; Label: Quality Control Music; Format: Streaming, digital download	—	—	—
Kill Us Both (with Ayilla)	Released: December 16, 2022; Label: Beilla Media; Format: Streaming, digital download	—	—	—
Rollin Stone (with J. Stone)	Released: January 4, 2023; Label: 25/8 No Breaks, All Money In No Money Out; Format: Streaming, digital download	—	—	—
Coke Boys 6 (with French Montana)	Released: January 6, 2023; Label: Coke Boys; Formats: Streaming, digital download	11	6	5
Bang on Dexter (with Kash Doll)	Released: February 10, 2023; Label: Kash Doll Enterprises, Inc., MNRK Records; Formats: Streaming, digital download	—	—	—
I'm Really Like That	Released: March 31, 2023; Label: MNRK; Formats: Streaming, digital download	67	30	21

== Singles ==
=== As lead artist ===
List of singles as lead artist, with selected chart positions, showing year released and album name
Title	Year	Peak chart positions					Album
Title	Year	US	US R&B /HH	US Rap	NZ	SWE	Album
"5000 Ones" (featuring Nelly, T.I., Yung Joc, Willie the Kid, Young Jeezy, Diddy and Twista)	2007	—	69	—	—	—	Gangsta Grillz: The Album
"The Art of Storytellin' Part 4" (featuring OutKast and Marsha Ambrosius)	2008	—	91	—	—	—	Gangsta Grillz: The Album
"Day Dreaming" (featuring Akon, Snoop Dogg and T.I.)	2009	—	88	—	33	58	Gangsta Grillz: The Album (Vol. 2)
"Ridiculous" (featuring Gucci Mane, Yo Gotti, Lonnie Mac and OJ da Juiceman)	2009	—	104	—	—	—	Gangsta Grillz: The Album (Vol. 2)
"Oh My" (featuring Fabolous, Roscoe Dash and Wiz Khalifa)	2011	95	18	12	—	—	Third Power
"We in This Bitch" (featuring Young Jeezy, T.I., Ludacris and Future)	2012	—	68	—	—	—	Quality Street Music
"My Moment" (featuring 2 Chainz, Meek Mill and Jeremih)	2012	89	23	16	—	—	Quality Street Music
"Never Die" (featuring Jadakiss, CeeLo Green, Nipsey Hussle and Jeezy)	2012	—	—	—	—	—	Quality Street Music
"So Many Girls" (featuring Tyga, Wale and Roscoe Dash)	2013	90	30	—	—	—	Quality Street Music
"Wishing" (featuring Chris Brown, Skeme and LyQuin)	2016	77	29	—	—	—	Quality Street Music 2
"Forever" (featuring Fabolous, Benny the Butcher, Jim Jones and Capella Grey)	2022	—	—	—	—	—	I'm Really Like That
"Ho4Me" (with Lil Baby featuring A Boogie wit da Hoodie)	2023	—	—	—	—	—	I'm Really Like That
"—" denotes a recording that did not chart or was not released in that territory.

=== As featured artist ===
List of singles as featured artist, with selected chart positions, showing year released and album name
Title	Year	Peak chart positions			Album
Title	Year	US	US R&B /HH	US Rap	Album
"Get Big" (Remix) (Dorrough featuring DJ Drama, Diddy, Yo Gotti, Bun B, Diamond, Shawty Lo, Wiz Khalifa and Maino)	2010	—	—	—	Non-album singles
"The Kings of the Streets" (DJ Kay Slay featuring DJ Khaled, DJ Drama, DJ Doo Wop and Fly Nate)	2011	—	75	—	Non-album singles
"Deja Vu" (Logic featuring DJ Drama)	2024	—	—	—	Ultra 85
"—" denotes a recording that did not chart or was not released in that territory.

== Other charted songs ==
List of songs, with selected chart positions, showing year released and album name
Title	Year	Peak chart positions			Album
Title	Year	US	US R&B /HH	US Rap	Album
"Undercover" (featuring Chris Brown and J. Cole)	2011	—	115	—	Third Power
"Popped Off" (T.I. featuring Dr. Dre and DJ Drama)	2012	—	75	—	Fuck Da City Up
"Ain't No Way Around It" (featuring Future)	2012	—	98	—	Third Power
"Pledge of Allegiance" (featuring Wiz Khalifa, Planet VI and B.o.B)	2012	—	48	—	Quality Street Music
"Sir Baudelaire" (Tyler, the Creator featuring DJ Drama)	2021	59	26	23	Call Me If You Get Lost
"Bop" (with Big Boogie featuring GloRilla)	2024	—	48	—	Redrum Wizard (Gangsta Grillz)
"—" denotes a recording that did not chart or was not released in that territory.

== Guest appearances ==
- 2006: "Freak" (Young Buck featuring DJ Drama)
- 2007: "Long Gone Missin'" (Trey Songz featuring DJ Drama)
- 2008: "Speedin' (We the Best Remix)" (Rick Ross featuring R. Kelly, DJ Khaled, Plies, Birdman, Busta Rhymes, DJ Drama, Webbie, Gorilla Zoe, Fat Joe, Torch, Gunplay, DJ Bigga Rankin', Flo Rida, Brisco and Lil Wayne)
- 2010: "Bounce, Rock, Skate (Kurupted Mix)" (Kurupt featuring DJ Drama, DJ Quik, Terrace Martin and Snoop Dogg)
- 2011: "Silent Assassin" (Dorrough featuring DJ Drama)
- 2012: "Popped Off" (T.I. featuring Dr. Dre and DJ Drama)
- 2012: "Dedication 4" (Lil Wayne mixtape)
- 2012: "40-40" (Troy Ave featuring Spot and DJ Drama)
- 2012: "He's from the A" (Micole featuring The-Dream, Gucci Mane, Roscoe Dash and DJ Drama)
- 2013: "Tongue Ring" (OverDoz featuring Cheetah Boyz and DJ Drama)
- 2014: STN MTN (Childish Gambino mixtape presented by Gangsta Grillz)
- 2015: Midwest Monsters 2 (King 810 EP produced by DJ Drama and presented by Gangsta Grillz)
- 2018: DiCaprio 2 (JID album)
- 2020: "Bandz Up" (Major League DJz featuring DJ Drama and Nasty C)
- 2021: Call Me If You Get Lost (Tyler, the Creator album)

== Music videos ==
=== As lead artist ===
List of music videos as lead artist, showing year released and directors
Title	Year	Director(s)
"5000 Ones" (featuring Nelly, T.I., Yung Joc, Willie the Kid, Young Jeezy, Diddy and Twista)	2007	Dale Resteghini
"Day Dreaming" (featuring Akon, Snoop Dogg and T.I.)	2009	Dale Resteghini
"Oh My" (featuring Fabolous, Roscoe Dash and Wiz Khalifa)	2011	Derek Pike
"Lock Down" (featuring Ya Boy and Akon)	2011	Daniel Czernilofsky
"Hand of God" (featuring Maino)	2011	James Kraze Billings
"Oh My" (Remix) (featuring Trey Songz, 2 Chainz and Big Sean)	2011	Decatur Dan
"Ain't No Way Around It" (Remix) (featuring Future, Big Boi and Young Jeezy)	2011	G. Visuals
"Never See You Again" (featuring Talia Coles and Wale)	2011	Prestige Film Works
"We in This Bitch" (featuring Young Jeezy, T.I., Ludacris and Future)	2012	Benny Boom
"My Moment" (featuring 2 Chainz, Meek Mill and Jeremih)	2012	Kareem Johnson
"So Many Girls" (featuring Roscoe Dash, Tyga and Wale)	2013	Alex Nazari

=== As featured artist ===
List of music videos as featured artist, showing year released and directors
Title	Year	Director(s)
"Get Big" (Remix) (Dorrough featuring DJ Drama, Diddy, Yo Gotti, Bun B, Diamond, Shawty Lo, Wiz Khalifa and Maino)	2010	Rage
"The Kings of the Streets" (DJ Kay Slay featuring DJ Khaled, DJ Drama, DJ Doo Wop and Fly Nate)	2011	none
