= Jesus piece =

Jesus piece or Jesus Piece may refer to:

- Open pasture behind Jesus College, Cambridge, upon which cricket was played
  - "To a Young Ass: Monologue to a Young Jack Ass in Jesus Piece", 1794 poem by Samuel Taylor Coleridge
- Jesus piece (jewelry), a type of jewelry depicting the face of Jesus
- Jesus Piece (album), a 2012 album by hip-hop artist the Game
- Jesus Piece (band), a hardcore/metal band from Philadelphia.
