= Absolute Greatness =

Studio album by Willie the Kid
- Released: September 30, 2008
- Recorded: 2007–08
- Genre: Hip hop
- Length: 48:06
- Label: Aphiliates; Embassy Entertainment; Asylum
- Producer: Brandon "Trendsetter" Douglass (exec.); DJ Drama (exec.); La the Darkman (exec.); Detroit Red; Don Cannon; Ron Boogie; Shotti Screwface; The Runners; V12 The Hitman; Vess Dynamic

Willie the Kid chronology
| Absolute Greatness (2008) | Never a Dull Moment (2010) |

Professional ratings
Review scores
| Source | Rating |
|---|---|
| HipHopDX | 2.5/5 |
| RapReviews | 7.5/10 |

Absolute Greatness is the debut album by American rapper Willie the Kid. It was released on September 30, 2008 through Aphilliates Music Group and Embassy Entertainment with distribution via Asylum Records. Production was handled by V12 The Hitman, Detroit Red, Don Cannon, Ron Boogie, Shotti Screwface, The Runners and Vess Dynamic, with Brandon "Trendsetter" Douglass, DJ Drama and La the Darkman serving as executive producers. It features guest appearances from La the Darkman, Bobby Valentino, Bun B, Flo Rida, Gucci Mane, Jovan Dais, Lonnie Mack, Rock City, Trey Songz and Yung Joc.

== Track listing ==
| No. | Title | Writer(s) | Producer(s) | Length |
|---|---|---|---|---|
| 1. | "Thang Back" | Willie B. Jackson; Don Cannon | Don Cannon | 3:33 |
| 2. | "Long Live the Prince" | W. Jackson; Jay-Christy Powell | Detroit Red | 2:07 |
| 3. | "Coogi Down" (featuring La the Darkman) | W. Jackson; Làson Jackson | Shotti Screwface | 3:08 |
| 4. | "Pressure" | W. Jackson; Andrew Harr; Jermaine Jackson | The Runners | 4:16 |
| 5. | "You" (featuring Bobby Valentino) | W. Jackson; Bobby Wilson; Mack Loggins | V12 The Hitman | 4:09 |
| 6. | "Love for Money" (featuring La the Darkman, Gucci Mane, Bun B, Flo Rida, Yung Joc and Trey Songz) | W. Jackson; L. Jackson; Radric Davis; Bernard Freeman; Tramar Dillard; Tremaine Neverson; Loggins | V12 The Hitman | 4:53 |
| 7. | "We Get Down" (featuring La the Darkman) | W. Jackson; L. Jackson; Loggins | V12 The Hitman | 3:46 |
| 8. | "Splendid!" | W. Jackson; Loggins | V12 The Hitman | 3:12 |
| 9. | "The W" (featuring Jovan Dais) | W. Jackson; Jovan Dais; Powell | Detroit Red | 3:52 |
| 10. | "Let Em Know" (featuring La the Darkman and Lonnie Mack) | W. Jackson; L. Jackson; L. Macintosh; Loggins | V12 The Hitman | 4:19 |
| 11. | "When the Lights Darken" (featuring Rock City) | W. Jackson; Theron Thomas; Timothy Thomas; Loggins | V12 The Hitman | 3:43 |
| 12. | "What They Wanna Hear" | W. Jackson; Cannon | Don Cannon | 3:01 |
| 13. | "Driven." | W. Jackson | Ron Boogie; Vess Dynamic | 4:07 |
| Total length: | | | | 48:06 |

== Chart history ==
| Chart (2008) | Peak position |
|---|---|
| US Top R&B/Hip-Hop Albums (Billboard) | 40 |
| US Top Rap Albums (Billboard) | 20 |
