= So Many Girls =

2013 single by DJ Drama featuring Tyga, Wale and Roscoe Dash

Single by DJ Drama featuring Tyga, Wale and Roscoe Dash

from the album Quality Street Music
- Released: September 28, 2012; February 20, 2013 (re-release)
- Length: 3:31
- Label: eOne
- Songwriters: Tyree Simmons; Matthew Samuels; Raymond Diaz; Jordan Sirhan; Joshua Scruggs; Olubowale Akintimehin; Michael Stevenson; Jeffrey Lee Johnson, Jr.; Alton Taylor; Robert Mickens; Robert Bell; Dennis Thomas; Robert Westfield; George Brown; Claydes Smith; Ronald Bell
- Producers: Boi-1da; Syk Sense

DJ Drama singles chronology
"We in This Bitch 1.5" (2012)	"So Many Girls" (2012)	"FDB (Remix)" (2013)

Tyga singles chronology
"Dope" (2012)	"So Many Girls" (2013)	"For the Road" (2013)

Wale singles chronology
"Bad" (2013)	"So Many Girls" (2013)	"LoveHate Thing" (2013)

Roscoe Dash singles chronology
"Snapbacks & Tattoos (Remix)" (2012)	"So Many Girls" (2013)	"Usta / KikIt" (2013)

Music video
- "So Many Girls" on YouTube

"So Many Girls" is a song by American hip hop artist DJ Drama featuring American rappers Tyga, Wale and Roscoe Dash. It was first released on September 28, 2012 as the fourth single from DJ Drama's fourth studio album Quality Street Music (2012), before being released to streaming services on February 20, 2013. Produced by Boi-1da and Syk Sense, the song contains a sample of the extended version of "Summer Madness" by Kool & the Gang.

== Music video ==
An official music video was released on February 18, 2013. Directed by Alex Nazari, and shot at the Harvard House Motel in Los Angeles, it sees the four artists at a house party, with plenty of women, who fill the hallways and bedrooms. Roscoe Dash is seen arriving in his white Cadillac. The video features static effects similar to that of VCR recordings.

== Charts ==
Chart (2013)	Peak position
US Billboard Hot 100	90
US Hot R&B/Hip-Hop Songs (Billboard)	30
