= 5000 Ones =

2007 single by DJ Drama

Single by DJ Drama featuring Nelly, T.I., Diddy, Yung Joc, Willie the Kid, Young Jeezy and Twista

from the album Gangsta Grillz: The Album
- Released: October 20, 2007
- Recorded: 2007
- Genre: Hip hop
- Length: 5:03 (album version); 4:47 (radio edit)
- Label: Grand Hustle, Atlantic
- Songwriters: Gary White; Cornell Haynes Jr.; Clifford Harris; Jasiel Robinson; Willie the Kid; Jay Jenkins; Carl Mitchell; Phalon Alexander; David Oddsson
- Producer: Jazze Pha

DJ Drama singles chronology
"Last Baby" (2006)	"5000 Ones" (2007)	"Day Dreaming" (2009)

Nelly singles chronology
"Wadsyaname" (2007)	"5000 Ones" (2007)	"Party People" (2008)

T.I. singles chronology
"Hurt" (2007)	"5000 Ones" (2007)	"That's Right" (2007)

Yung Joc singles chronology
"Bottle Poppin'" (2007)	"5000 Ones" (2007)	"Portrait of Love" (2007)

Willie the Kid singles chronology
"Takin' Pictures" (2007)	"5000 Ones" (2007)	"Love for Money" (2008)

Young Jeezy singles chronology
"Diamonds" (2007)	"5000 Ones" (2007)	"100 Million" (2007)

Twista singles chronology
"Give It Up" (2007)	"5000 Ones" (2007)	"Money" (2008)

"5000 Ones" is a song by American record producer DJ Drama. The song serves as his debut single and the lead single from his debut studio album Gangsta Grillz: The Album. The hip hop song, produced by Jazze Pha, features vocals from several rappers, namely Nelly, T.I., Yung Joc, Willie the Kid, Young Jeezy and Twista, as well as Diddy on background vocals and ad-libs. The single peaked at #52 on the U.S. Billboard Hot R&B/Hip-Hop Songs and peaked at #9 on the Hot Rap Tracks.

== Music video ==
The music video for "5000 Ones" premiered on BET’s Rap City on October 20, 2007. The video features cameo appearances from Jazze Pha, Swizz Beatz, Mr. Collipark, Gorilla Zoe, Jim Jones, Webbie, DJ Khaled, Jacki-O, Project Pat, Fabolous, Blood Raw, Slick Pulla, Roccett, Raekwon, Young Dro, Freeway, Diamond, Princess, Rasheeda, Jermaine Dupri, E-40, Lil Scrappy, Big Kuntry King, P$C, Alfamega, Yung LA, Mac Boney, The-Dream, Rick Ross, Juelz Santana, David Banner and Lil Duval among others.

== Charts ==
Chart (2007)	Peak position
US Hot R&B/Hip-Hop Songs (Billboard)	69
