= Never a Dull Moment (EP) =

EP by Willie the Kid & Lee Bannon
- Released: July 27, 2010
- Recorded: 2010
- Genre: Hip hop
- Label: Apphiliates Music Group/Embassy Ent.
- Producer: Lee Bannon

Willie the Kid chronology
Absolute Greatness (2008)	Never a Dull Moment (2010)

Lee Bannon chronology
Never a Dull Moment (2010)

Never a Dull Moment is the collaborative EP by rapper Willie the Kid and producer Lee Bannon. It was released on July 27, 2010, through Apphiliates Music Group and Embassy Entertainment.

== Track listing ==
1. "Blades"
2. "News Flash"
3. "Necessary Way" (featuring La the Darkman)
4. "M140 Weighs a Ton"
5. "Bath Water Running"
6. "Sky Miles" (featuring Currensy)
7. "Hickory Smoke"
