= Ali Bomaye =

Song by The Game featuring 2 Chainz and Rick Ross

from the album Jesus Piece
- Released: December 11, 2012
- Recorded: 2012
- Genre: Hip hop, cloud rap
- Length: 6:12 (Explicit album version); 5:21 (Clean album version)
- Label: DGC Records; Interscope Records
- Songwriters: Jayceon Taylor; Byron Forest; Tauheed Epps; William Roberts; Maurice Jordan; Florence Welch; Paul Epworth
- Producer: Black Metaphor

"Ali Bomaye" is a song by American rapper The Game, featured as the second track from his fifth studio album Jesus Piece. "Ali Bomaye" features fellow rappers 2 Chainz and Rick Ross, with production from Black Metaphor and samples "Seven Devils" by Florence and the Machine. The song has since peaked at number one on the Billboard Bubbling Under R&B/Hip-Hop Singles chart and appears in the soundtrack to Grand Theft Auto V. Despite never being released as a single, it is Game's third most streamed song on Spotify as of 2025.

== Background ==
When Muhammad Ali faced George Foreman in 1974's Rumble in the Jungle, Congolese (Zairian at the time) audience members cheered Ali by shouting, "Ali boma ye!", meaning, "Ali, kill him!" in Lingala. The Game would take inspiration from that chant on the chorus of the track. He told Vibe, "I just happened to be watching the movie and didn't have a song title or arc yet, so I was like fuck it... Ali Bomaye. And that's how I came up with the hook, really." He then sent the track to 2 Chainz and Rick Ross to polish off the song with their verses. The song ends with a skit featuring comedian Kevin Hart.

== Music video ==
In January 2013, The Game shot the first part of the music video with Rick Ross. On February 11 and 12, 2013 The Game shot the majority of the music video, with 2 Chainz in Los Angeles. The final version of the music video was released on July 2, 2013, and featured cameo appearances from French Montana, DJ Khaled and Chris Brown, among others. The video Directed by J.R. Saint and produced by Mahad Dar of Creative Dream Productions. The video has amassed over 120,000,000 views on YouTube.

== Critical reception ==
"Ali Bomaye" was met with generally positive reviews from music critics. DJBooth.net said the "beat on "Ali Bomaye" is absolutely a beast, and on the whole it's just one of those songs that demands some serious head nodding." David Jeffries of AllMusic called the song a, "10 Commandments-busting anthem, which makes selling your soul to the devil sound swanky and sweet. Slava Kuperstein of HipHopDX, praised the song's "rich production and epic vocal samples." Also saying, "2 Chainz and Rick Ross are merely tolerable on the cut (neither brings their best), but Game’s ear for production serves him well here." However, Eric Revis of The New York Times called Ross' verse on the song "excellent". Also Chris Dart of Exclaim! stated that The Game was overshadowed by 2 Chainz' charisma on the song. However, Phillip Mlynar of Spin said, "2 Chainz sounds worryingly constipated" on the track.

In August 2013, "Ali Bomaye" was serviced to DJ's as a promotional single from his fifth album Jesus Piece. The song is also featured on the soundtrack to Grand Theft Auto V on the Radio Los Santos station, which features hip hop contemporary to the video game's release.

== Chart performance ==
Chart (2013)	Peak position
US Bubbling Under R&B/Hip-Hop Singles (Billboard)	1

== Certifications ==
Region	Certification	Certified units/sales
New Zealand (RMNZ)	Gold	15,000^{‡}
United Kingdom (BPI)	Silver	200,000^{‡}
^{‡} Sales+streaming figures based on certification alone.
