= My Moment (DJ Drama song) =

Single by DJ Drama featuring 2 Chainz, Meek Mill and Jeremih

from the album Quality Street Music
- Released: June 29, 2012
- Recorded: 2012
- Genre: Hip hop; R&B
- Length: 3:15
- Label: Entertainment One
- Songwriters: Simmons; Tauheed Epps; Robert Williams; Jeremih Felton; Tyler Williams
- Producer: T-Minus

DJ Drama singles chronology
"We in This Bitch" (2012)	"My Moment" (2012)	"We in This Bitch 1.5" (2012)

2 Chainz singles chronology
"Beez in the Trap" (2012)	"My Moment" (2012)	"Birthday Song" (2012)

Meek Mill singles chronology
"Amen" (2012)	"My Moment" (2012)	"Triumphant (Get 'Em)" (2012)

Jeremih singles chronology
"Amen" (2012)	"My Moment" (2012)	"All That (Lady)" (2013)

"My Moment" is a song by American hip hop artist DJ Drama, released June 29, 2012, as the second single from his fourth studio album Quality Street Music (2012). The song, produced by record producer T-Minus, features American rappers 2 Chainz, Meek Mill and R&B singer-songwriter Jeremih.

== Music video ==
The music video was shot at OVO Fest, in Toronto, on August 6, 2012. DJ Drama gathered the song's featured artists and also released behind-the-scenes pictures of the video shoot via his Instagram account. The video premiered on MTV Jams on September 9, 2012, it featured the artists performing the song in an alleyway with visual cameo appearances from ASAP Rocky, Drake, and Waka Flocka Flame.

== Chart performance ==
The song first charted on the week of July 23, 2012, debuting at No. 92 on the Billboard Hot R&B/Hip-Hop Songs. On its second week on the chart, the song climbed to No. 87. On its fourth week the song climbed to No. 76 and has peaked at No. 23. On the week of October 18, the song debuted on the Hot 100 at No. 99. It has since peaked at No. 89, becoming DJ Drama's second highest-charting single as a lead artist, behind "Wishing" in 2016.

=== Charts ===
Chart (2012)	Peak position
US Billboard Hot 100	89
US Hot R&B/Hip-Hop Songs (Billboard)	23
US Hot Rap Songs (Billboard)	16
US Rhythmic Airplay (Billboard)	26

== Release history ==
Country	Date	Format	Label	Ref
United States	June 29, 2012	Digital download	Entertainment One	
