= All That (Lady) =

Single by The Game featuring Lil Wayne, Big Sean, Fabolous and Jeremih

from the album Jesus Piece
- Released: February 19, 2013
- Recorded: 2012
- Genre: Hip hop; R&B
- Length: 3:34
- Label: DGC; Interscope
- Songwriters: J. Taylor; D. Carter; J. Jackson; S. Anderson; J. Felton; A. Lyon; M. Valenzano
- Producer: Cool and Dre

The Game singles chronology
"Celebration" (2012)	"All That (Lady)" (2013)	"Or Nah" (2014)

Lil Wayne singles chronology
"Love Me" (2013)	"All That (Lady)" (2013)	"Karate Chop" (2013)

Big Sean singles chronology
"Show Out" (2013)	"All That (Lady)" (2013)	"Switch Up" (2013)

Fabolous singles chronology
"Oh My" (2011)	"All That (Lady)" (2013)	"Ready" (2013)

Jeremih singles chronology
"My Moment" (2012)	"All That (Lady)" (2013)	"Party Girls" (2014)

"All That (Lady)" is a song by American rapper The Game, released as the second single from his fifth studio album Jesus Piece. The song features additional vocals from fellow rappers Lil Wayne, Big Sean, Fabolous and American singer/rapper Jeremih. The song contains a clear vocal sample of "Lady" by D'Angelo. The week of the album's release the song "All That (Lady)" debuted at number 48 on the Billboard R&B/Hip-Hop Songs chart.

== Background ==
On December 4, 2012 Game premiered the song on Power 106's Big Boy Neighborhood in promotion of Jesus Piece. After that it had been rumored to be the second single and Game announced he would shoot a video for it. Then on February 19, 2013 the song was sent to radio as the second official single.

== Music video ==
During the week of the BET Awards 2013 Game shot the music video for the single along with Big Sean and Jeremih. The music video for "All That (Lady)" was released on November 1, 2013, shortly after his announcement of signing to Cash Money Records. Lil Wayne and Fabolous do not make appearances in the video.

== Critical reception ==
"All That (Lady)" received generally positive reviews from music critics. Leading up to the release of the album, Game would post a text message he received from Dr. Dre where Dre praised the song. XXL praised the songs soulful instrumental and Lil Wayne's guest verse. The New York Times also praised Wayne's verse on the song. PopMatters praised all the artists verses and the D'Angelo sample.

== Charts ==
Chart (2013)	Peak position
US Hot R&B/Hip-Hop Songs (Billboard)	48
