= Celebration (The Game song) =

Single by Game featuring Chris Brown, Tyga, Wiz Khalifa and Lil Wayne

from the album Jesus Piece
- Released: September 2, 2012
- Genre: West Coast hip-hop
- Length: 4:49
- Label: DGC; Interscope
- Songwriters: Jayceon Taylor; Christopher Brown; Michael Stevenson; Dwayne Carter; Cameron Thomaz; J. King
- Producers: SAP; Cool & Dre

The Game singles chronology
| "Pot of Gold" (2011) | "Celebration" (2012) | "All That (Lady)" (2013) |

Chris Brown singles chronology
| "Algo Me Gusta de Ti" (2012) | "Celebration" (2012) | "Ready" (2013) |

Tyga singles chronology
| "Gold" (2012) | "Celebration" (2012) | "Live It Up" (2012) |

Lil Wayne singles chronology
| "Ice" (2012) | "Celebration" (2012) | "No Worries" (2012) |

Wiz Khalifa singles chronology
| "Work Hard, Play Hard" (2012) | "Celebration" (2012) | "Remember You" (2012) |

Music video
- "Celebration" on YouTube

"Celebration" is a song by American rapper Game featuring fellow American rappers Tyga, Wiz Khalifa, & Lil Wayne and American singer Chris Brown, released as the lead single from the former's fifth studio album Jesus Piece. "Celebration" premiered on Los Angeles' Power 106 on August 22, 2012. The song samples Bone Thugs-n-Harmony's hit single "1st of tha Month", which in return samples the Chapter 8 and Anita Baker song "I Just Want to Be Your Girl".

== Production and recording ==
Celebration was written by Game (credited as Jayceon Taylor), Lil Wayne, Tyga, Chris Brown and Wiz Khalifa. Production of the song was handled by Cool & Dre and their protégé SAP. Celebration samples Bone Thugs-n-Harmony's hit 1st of tha Month produced by DJ U-Neek. Game said, "I grew up in Compton, California, and I'm a huge fan of Bone Thugs-n-Harmony. This is my fifth album, and my whole career I've been trying to figure out how to flip '1st of Tha Month' and I finally did it... I wanted to keep the feel of the song without taking too much of the original."

In an early version of the song, Game says he's "scoopin' up Drake and hittin' the freeway" instead of "scoopin' up Chris." "Drake" was replaced with "Chris" on the album version due to the feud between the two artists that had erupted a few months after the song was recorded. This version of the song also does not have a verse from Wiz Khalifa.

== Critical reception ==
David Jeffries from Allmusic wrote: "The breezy and nostalgic closer "Celebration" feels more like a Sunday picnic than a Sunday sermon." Pitchfork called this song "catchy Bone Thugs redux." Jon Dolan called this song "redemptive." USA Today listed this song in Download This list. XXL was positive: "Most instrumentals on the record are, appropriately, soulful but not identical, as highlights more thump, such as the album's first single "Celebration."

== Chart performance ==
"Celebration" managed to attain chart success, debuted and peaked at number 82 on the Billboard Hot 100, number 22 on US Rhythmic chart and number 24 on the Hot Hip-Hop/R&B chart. Lil Wayne's contribution earned him his 109th chart entry, surpassing Elvis Presley's record for the most chart entries. It re-entered the Billboard Hot 100 on the week of November 22, 2012 at number 100. The song spent a total of 12 weeks on the Hot 100 and 20 weeks on the Hip-Hop/R&B chart.

== Music video ==
The music video was directed by Matt Alonzo and produced by Tara Razavi, Michael Busalacchi and KeElviyn Craver. Game told MTV news that fans could expect a similar feel and visual from his mentor Dr. Dre's hit single Nuthin' but a 'G' Thang (featuring Snoop Doggy Dogg).

"The concept of the video is Nuthin' but a 'G' Thang my videos, I don't like them to be fake or feel like anybody gotta act, so we're really having a barbecue out here," Game said. "It's real food, it ain't no prop food, it's real water guns — everything real."

Game, Chris Brown, Tyga, Lil Wayne and Wiz Khalifa all appear in the video performing their part of the song. Game's son Harlem, Warren G, Mack Maine and Birdman are cameos in the video. The music video was released on September 18, 2012.

As of April 2021, the video has over 60 million views on YouTube.

== Remix ==
Shortly before their set at Rock the Bells' San Francisco Bay area on Sunday night, Bone Thugs-n-Harmony said they were appreciative of Game's new single which samples both their music and stylings.

"I feel like any song that we do that someone remixes we may have looked at as being disrespectful back when we were young and getting in the game," Wish Bone said from the tour stop in Mountain View, California. "But us being in the game for 20 years and younger cats coming up behind us doing our style, a style that we invented, that's kind of a compliment."

Game posted a picture on his Twitter showing the word "bone" structured with cannabis. Game later confirmed that he is working in the studio with Bone Thugs-n-Harmony on a remix for "Celebration". On October 28, an official remix, featuring all five members of Bone Thugs-n-Harmony was released by Game. It was positively received by the critics. The Game and the Bone Thugs filmed a music video for the track on November 14, 2012 in Los Angeles.

== Charts ==
=== Weekly charts ===
| Chart (2012–13) | Peak position |
|---|---|
| US Billboard Hot 100 | 81 |
| US Hot R&B/Hip-Hop Songs (Billboard) | 24 |
| US R&B/Hip-Hop Airplay (Billboard) | 30 |
| US Rhythmic Airplay (Billboard) | 22 |

=== Year-end charts ===
| Chart (2013) | Position |
|---|---|
| US Hot R&B/Hip-Hop Songs (Billboard) | 100 |

== Certifications ==
| Region | Certification | Certified units/sales |
|---|---|---|
| New Zealand (RMNZ) | Gold | 15,000^{‡} |
^{‡} Sales+streaming figures based on certification alone.

== Credits and personnel ==
Sample

- Contains elements from the composition "1st of tha Month" written by Bone Thugs-n-Harmony and produced by DJ U-Neek.

== Radio and release history ==
| Country | Date | Format | Label |
|---|---|---|---|
| Canada | September 2, 2012 | Digital download | DGC/Interscope |
| United States | September 2, 2012 | Digital download | DGC/Interscope |
| United States | September 2, 2012 | Rhythmic contemporary radio | DGC/Interscope |
| United States | September 2, 2012 | Urban contemporary radio | DGC/Interscope |
| United States | September 2, 2012 | Contemporary hit radio | DGC/Interscope |
