= Oh My (DJ Drama song) =

2011 single by DJ Drama

Single by DJ Drama featuring Fabolous, Roscoe Dash and Wiz Khalifa

from the album Third Power
- Released: May 13, 2011
- Recorded: 2010–2011
- Genre: Hip hop
- Length: 4:23 (album version); 4:15 (radio edit); 4:59 (remix)
- Label: Aphilliates; Entertainment One
- Songwriters: Tyree C. Simmons; Christopher J. Gholson; John D. Jackson; Jeffrey L. Johnson; Cameron J. Thomaz
- Producer: Drumma Boy

DJ Drama singles chronology
"Ridiculous" (2009)	"Oh My" (2011)	"We in This Bitch" (2012)

Fabolous singles chronology
"You Be Killin Em" (2011)	"Oh My" (2011)	"All That (Lady)" (2013)

Wiz Khalifa singles chronology
"Till I'm Gone" (2011)	"Oh My" (2011)	"No Sleep" (2012)

Roscoe Dash singles chronology
"Haters" (2011)	"Oh My" (2011)	"Let It Fly" (2011)

"Oh My" is a song by American hip hop disc jockey DJ Drama, released on May 13, 2011 as the lead single from his third studio album, Third Power. The song was produced by Memphis-based producer Drumma Boy, and features guest performances from American rappers Fabolous, Roscoe Dash and Wiz Khalifa. "Oh My" peaked at number 95 on the Billboard Hot 100—becoming Drama's first entry on the chart—and number 18 on the Hot R&B/Hip-Hop Songs chart.

== Music video ==
The music video, directed by Derek Pike was released on July 6, 2011 and can be purchased on iTunes The video features cameo roles from actor and comedian Kevin Hart, DJ Clue?, Big Sean, New England Patriots Wide Receiver Chad Ochocinco and Pittsburgh Steelers Outside Linebacker LaMarr Woodley.

== Charts ==
=== Weekly charts ===
Chart (2011)	Peak position
US Billboard Hot 100	95
US Hot R&B/Hip-Hop Songs (Billboard)	18
US Hot Rap Songs (Billboard)	12

=== Year-end charts ===
Chart (2011)	Position
US Hot R&B/Hip-Hop Songs (Billboard)	78

== Release information ==
Country	Date	Format	Label	Ref
United States	June 17, 2011	Digital download	Entertainment One	

== Remix ==
"Oh My (Remix)"

Song by DJ Drama featuring Trey Songz, 2 Chainz and Big Sean

from the album Third Power
- Released: August 9, 2011
- Recorded: 2011
- Genre: Hip hop
- Length: 4:59
- Label: Entertainment One
- Songwriters: Tyree Simmons, Christopher Gholson, Tremaine Neverson, Tauheed Epps, Sean Anderson
- Producer: Drumma Boy

Music video
- "Oh My (Remix)" on YouTube

"Oh My (Remix)" is a song by American hip hop artist DJ Drama and the official remix to the lead single from his third studio album Third Power. The song, included as the twelfth track on the album, maintains the original production from Drumma Boy, however features new guest appearances from American singer Trey Songz, and American rappers 2 Chainz and Big Sean. The song was released to digital retailers on August 9, 2011. On September 8, the official music video for the remix was released. Cameos in the video for the remix were made by Drumma Boy and Curren$y.

=== Release Information ===
==== Purchaseable Release ====
Country	Date	Format	Label	Ref
United States	August 9, 2011	Digital download	Entertainment One	
