= Jesus piece (jewelry) =

Piece of jewelry depicting Jesus

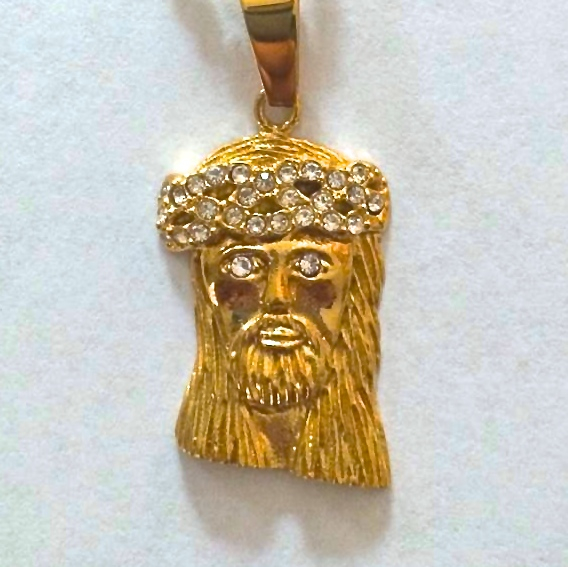
Gold Jesus piece detailed with gems.

A Jesus piece is a spiritual or religious piece of jewelry that is popular in the hip hop community and depicts the face of Jesus wearing the crown of thorns. Many hip hop artists and celebrities, including The Notorious B.I.G., Jay-Z, Kanye West, Big Pun, The Game, Kendrick Lamar and Meek Mill among others, have adopted the Jesus piece as a common fashion accessory and have them decorated with many precious gems. Cheaper Jesus pieces have also been sold in other materials including wood and inexpensive metals. Traditional medals in Western Christianity that are worn as necklaces have depicted the Holy Face of Jesus.

The Boombox wrote in 2018 that "the Jesus piece has arguably become one of the most iconic pieces of jewelry in hip-hop" while Highsnobiety wrote that "the Jesus piece has arguably become the most popular pendant of all time" in 2017.

== History ==
=== Puerto Rican Jesus (Jesus Valentine) ===
The first rapper to wear the Jesus piece was Puerto Rican Jesus. It was made by Tito The Jeweler in 1989.

=== The Notorious B.I.G. ===
So I just speak my piece, keep my peace Cubans with the Jesus piece, with my peeps...

— The Notorious B.I.G., "Hypnotize"

The popularity of the Jesus piece is attributed to Christopher Wallace (The Notorious B.I.G.) and Tito Caicedo, Wallace's jeweler. Wallace paid Tito approximately $10,000 a piece for multiple Jesus pieces that he would give to those he worked with and wear himself. The Jesus pieces were decorated with precious gems, specifically on the hair of Jesus.

=== Jay-Z ===
When Wallace died in 1997, his Jesus piece was given to his son Christopher Wallace Jr. "CJ". Jay-Z would then wear the Jesus piece multiple times for whenever he would record a new album. Two years after Wallace's death, Jay-Z appeared on the December 1999 issue of the XXL magazine with a Jesus piece.

Jay-Z wrote in his book, Decoded, the importance of Wallace's Jesus piece; "It's part of my ritual when I record an album: I wear the Jesus piece and let my hair grow till I'm done".

=== Kanye West ===
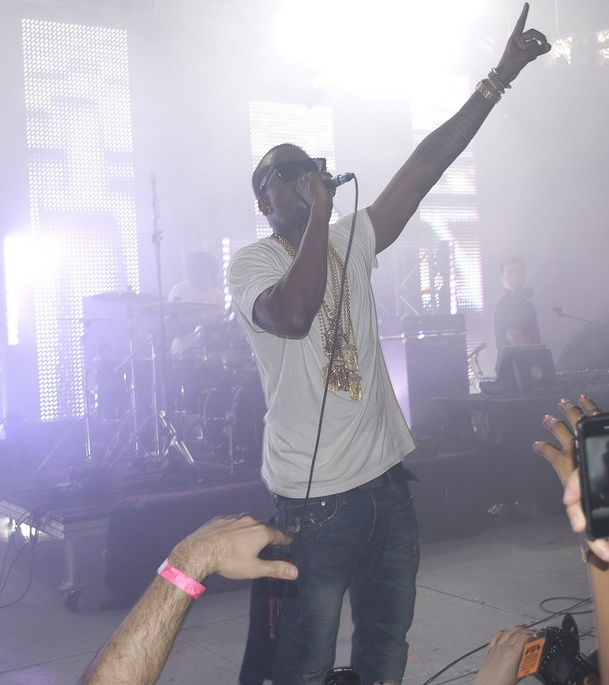
West wearing multiple Jesus pieces in 2009.

==== Jacob Arabo partnership ====
In 2004, Kanye West partnered with Jacob Arabo, a jeweler that outfitted many hip-hop artists with their jewelry. West's personal Jesus piece created by Jacob cost $25,000, was the size of a man's palm and had clear diamonds for Jesus' crown of thorns, yellow and light-brown diamonds as Jesus' blond hair, aquamarines for blue eyes and small rubies for the tears of blood on his face. In an interview with Rolling Stone, West explains complications he had creating the revised Jesus piece by repeating a discussion he had with Jacob.

"I love the way it looks with the blue eyes, but I'll get too much flak for it. I can't explain that blue-eyed shit. I need to do another one. A black one. Because I have socially conscious lyrics and I'm-a get flak."

After experimenting with various colors for the piece's eyes, West decided that the aquamarine blue eyes were best suited for the piece. West then jokingly explained how he would avoid social commentary saying, "I'll say it's the one (Jesus) off my grandmother's wall! It's Grandma's Jesus!"

==== Takashi Murakami partnership ====
In 2007, West again created another derivation of the Jesus piece with Japanese artist Takashi Murakami, who created the cover artwork for West's Graduation. The Jesus piece was estimated to cost approximately $200,000.

== In popular culture ==
- The album cover of Kanye West's 2007 album Graduation features the Dropout Bear wearing a Jesus piece similar to Murakami's design.
- The Game's 2012 album Jesus Piece has a deluxe edition cover that features a stained glass Jesus wearing a Jesus piece.
- Rick Ross' 2012 album God Forgives, I Don't has Rick Ross wearing multiple Jesus pieces on both the standard and deluxe edition covers.
- In a Power 106 interview, Big Sean stated that after he had lost the Jesus piece that Kanye West had given him, his former label mate Kid Cudi gave his personal Jesus piece to Big Sean.
- The album cover of Boosie Badazz's 2015 album, Touch Down 2 Cause Hell, features Boosie Badazz wearing multiple Jesus pieces.
- The song "Jesus Piece" on the album MDNA made by the German rap group Genetikk.

== See also ==
- Cross necklace
- Holy Face of Jesus
