= Quality Street Music =

Studio album by DJ Drama
- Released: October 2, 2012
- Recorded: 2011–12
- Genre: Hip-hop
- Length: 58:41
- Labels: Aphilliates; Embassy; Powerhouse; eOne
- Producers: Boi-1da; The Maven Boys; Cardiak; DJ Mustard; Hit-Boy; Jahlil Beats; Kane Beatz; V2 the Hitman; T-Minus; TM88; Remo the Hitmaker; Jeffery James; JMIKE; Syk Sense

DJ Drama chronology
Third Power (2011)	Quality Street Music (2012)	Quality Street Music 2 (2016)

Singles from Quality Street Music
- 1. "We in This Bitch" Released: February 29, 2012; 2. "My Moment" Released: June 29, 2012; 3. "Never Die" Released: September 15, 2012; 4. "So Many Girls" Released: February 20, 2013

Professional ratings
Review scores
Source	Rating
Allmusic	4/5 stars

Quality Street Music is the fourth studio album by American hip hop disc jockey DJ Drama. It was released on October 2, 2012, by Entertainment One Music, Aphilliates Music Group, Embassy Entertainment, and Powerhouse Productions. The album features guest appearances from Kendrick Lamar, Childish Gambino, T-Pain, Fabolous, Jeezy, Drake, Future, Nipsey Hussle, Wiz Khalifa, T.I., Ludacris, 2 Chainz, B.o.B., Kid Ink, Jeremih, Meek Mill, Waka Flocka Flame, Tyler, the Creator, Wale, Gucci Mane, Birdman, and Rick Ross, among others.

== Singles ==
The album's lead single, "We in This Bitch" was released for digital download on February 29, 2012. The song features guest vocals from American hip hop recording artists Future, Jeezy, T.I., Ludacris, with production by Kane Beatz and JMIKE. The song peaking at number 68 on the US Billboard's Hot R&B/Hip-Hop Songs. The music video was released on May 8, 2012, and it was directed by Benny Boom.

The album's second single, "My Moment" was released on June 29, 2012, via iTunes. The song features guest vocals from hip hop recording artists 2 Chainz and Meek Mill, along with an American R&B singer Jeremih, with the production on this track was handled and provided by T-Minus. The song peaking at number 23 on the US Hot R&B/Hip-Hop Songs chart, number 16 on the Rap Songs, and number 89 on the Hot 100. The music video was shot at OVO Fest, in Toronto, on August 6, 2012. DJ Drama gathered the song's featured artists and also released behind-the-scenes pictures of the video shoot via his Instagram account. The music video premiered on MTV Jams on September 9, 2012.

The album's third single was this second version of "We in This Bitch", which was called "We in This Bitch 1.5", which also features guest vocals from southern rapper Future with his new verse, and Canadian hip hop recording artist Drake. It was released on May 11, 2012, however, it later came out as a digital download on September 4, 2012.

The album's fourth single, "Never Die" was released on September 15, 2012. The song features guest vocals from American hip hop recording artists Jeezy, Jadakiss and Nipsey Hussle, along with American singer-songwriter Cee Lo Green, with the production that was handled and provided by Cardiak. On that same day, it came out to be included on the final track list for the album.

=== Other songs ===
Upon Quality Street Music's release, "So Many Girls" featuring Wale, Tyga and Roscoe Dash, peaking at number 44 on the US Hot R&B/Hip-Hop Digital Songs. The cover for the song was released on October 8. It was released as a single on February 20, 2013, and debuted on the Hot 100 at number 90.

"Pledge of Allegiance" featuring Wiz Khalifa, Planet VI and B.o.B., debuted on the US Hot R&B/Hip-Hop Songs chart at number 48 despite never being released as a single.

== Commercial performance ==
The album debuted at number 15 on the US Billboard 200, and at number 3 on the Top R&B/Hip-Hop Albums, selling 25,000 copies on its first week. Quality Street Music is DJ Drama's highest charting album to date. As of February 7, 2013, the album has sold 51,080 copies in the United States.

== Track listing ==
No.	Title	Writer(s)	Producer(s)	Length
1.	"Goin' Down" (featuring Fabolous, T-Pain, and Yo Gotti)	Tyree Simmons; John Jackson; Faheem Najm; Mario Mims; Matthew Samuels; Brett Kruger; Zale Epstein	Boi-1da; The Maven Boys	4:19
2.	"Never Die" (featuring Jadakiss, CeeLo Green, Nipsey Hussle, and Jeezy)	Simmons; Jason Phillips; Thomas Callaway; Ermias Asghedom; Jay Jenkins; Carl McCormick	Cardiak	4:40
3.	"My Moment" (featuring 2 Chainz, Meek Mill, and Jeremih)	Simmons; Tauheed Epps; Robert Williams; Jeremih Felton; Tyler Williams	T-Minus	3:20
4.	"We in This Bitch" (featuring Jeezy, T.I., Ludacris, and Future)	Simmons; Jenkins; Jeremy Coleman; Nayvadius Wilburn; Clifford Harris, Jr.; Christopher Bridges; Daniel Johnson	Kane Beatz; JMIKE	4:04
5.	"So Many Girls" (featuring Tyga, Wale, and Roscoe Dash)	Simmons; Samuels; Raymond Diaz; Jordan Sirhan; Joshua Scruggs; Olubowale Akintimehin; Michael Stevenson; Jeffrey Lee Johnson, Jr.; Alton Taylor; Robert Mickens; Robert Bell; Dennis Thomas; Robert Westfield; George Brown; Claydes Smith; Ronald Bell	Boi-1da; Syk Sense	3:31
6.	"Clouds" (featuring Rick Ross, Miguel, Pusha T, and Curren$y)	Simmons; Mack Loggins; William Roberts II; Miguel Pimentel; Terrence Thornton; Shante Franklin	V12 the Hitman	4:07
7.	"Chocolate Droppa (Skit)" (featuring Kevin Hart)	Kevin Hart	Hart	1:19
8.	"I'ma Hata" (featuring Waka Flocka Flame, Tyler, the Creator, and Derez De'Shon)	T. Simmons; Derez Lenard; Juaquin Malphurs; Tyler Okonma; Bryan Simmons	TM88	4:21
9.	"Real Niggas in the Building" (featuring Travis Porter and Kirko Bangz)	Simmons; Donquez Woods; Harold Duncan; Lakeem Mattox; Kirk Randle; Dijon McFarlane	DJ Mustard	4:32
10.	"My Way" (featuring Common, Lloyd, and Kendrick Lamar)	Simmons; Lonnie Lynn; Lloyd Polite; Kendrick Duckworth; Chauncey Hollis	Hit-Boy	3:40
11.	"Pledge of Allegiance" (featuring Wiz Khalifa, R. City (credited as Planet VI), and B.o.B)	Simmons; Jeffery James; Cameron Thomaz; Timothy Thomas; Theron Thomas; Bobby Simmons, Jr.	James	4:32
12.	"Same Ol' Story" (featuring Kid Ink, Schoolboy Q, Cory Gunz, and Childish Gambino)	Simmons; Loggins; Brian Collins; Quincy Hanley; Peter Pankey, Jr.; Donald Glover	V12 the Hitman	4:25
13.	"We in This Bitch 1.5" (featuring Drake and Future)	Simmons; Wilburn; Johnson; JR Brown; Coleman; Aubrey Graham	Kane Beatz; JMIKE	3:23
14.	"My Audemars" (featuring Meek Mill, Birdman, and Gucci Mane)	Simmons; R. Williams; Bryan Williams; Radric Davis; Orlando Tucker	Jahlil Beats	4:47
15.	"Monique's Room" (featuring Fred the Godson)	Simmons; Frederick Thomas; Remo Green	Remo the Hitmaker	4:07
Total length:				58:41

== Personnel ==
Credits for Quality Street Music adapted from Allmusic.

- 2 Chainz – Featured Artist
- Olubowale Akintimehin – Composer
- Derek "MixedByAli" Ali – Engineer
- Kori Anders – Engineer
- Ermias Asghedom – Composer
- Bart Simmons – Composer
- Lu Balz – Mixing
- Kirko Bangz – Featured Artist
- Alton Bates – Engineer
- Jahill Beats – Producer
- Birdman – Featured Artist
- B.o.B – Featured Artist
- Boi-1DA – Producer
- Andre Bridges – Engineer
- Christopher Bridges – Composer
- Jack "Suthernfolk" Brown – Engineer
- Thomas Calloway – Composer
- Cardiak – Producer
- Elliot Carter – Engineer
- Childish Gambino – Featured Artist
- Clifford Harris – Composer
- Jeremy Coleman – Composer
- Talia Coles – Wardrobe
- Brian Collins – Composer
- Common – Featured Artist
- Currensy – Featured Artist
- Drake – Featured Artist
- Roscoe Dash – Featured Artist
- Radric Davis – Composer
- D.E.B.O. – Featured Artist
- Hector Delgado – Engineer
- DJ Drama – A&R, Primary Artist
- DJ Mustard – Producer
- Kendrick Duckworth – Composer
- Harold Duncan – Composer
- Tauheed Epps – Composer
- Fabolous – Featured Artist
- Jeremy Felton – Composer
- Seth Firkins – Engineer
- Steve Fischer – Engineer
- Hayden Flack – Assistant
- 40 – Engineer
- Shante Scott Franklin – Composer
- Future – Featured Artist
- Ghost – Engineer
- Donald Glover – Composer
- Stephen Glover – Engineer
- Fred the Godson – Featured Artist
- Aubrey Graham – Composer
- Cee Lo Green – Featured Artist
- Remo Green – Composer
- Paul Grosso – Creative Director
- Gucci Mane – Featured Artist
- Cory Gunz – Featured Artist
- Quincy Hanley – Composer
- Kevin Hart – Primary Artist
- Eddie Hernandez – Engineer
- Hit-Boy – Producer
- Remo the Hitmaker – Engineer, producer
- Chauncey Hollis – Composer
- Bradley Home – Engineer
- Nipsey Hussle – Featured Artist
- Jess Jackson – Engineer
- John Jackson – Composer
- Jadakiss – Featured Artist
- Jeffery James – Composer
- Jeffrey James – Producer
- Jay Jenkins – Composer
- Jeremih – Featured Artist
- J-MIKE – Producer
- Daniel Andrew Johnson – Composer
- Ricardo "Stickuhbush" Johnson – Engineer
- Jeffrey Lee Johnson, Jr. – Composer
- Kane Beatz – Producer
- Kid Ink – Featured Artist
- Rob Kinelski – Engineer
- Kendrick Lamar – Featured Artist
- Jeff Lane – Engineer
- Derez Lenard – Composer
- Mack Loggins – Composer
- Ludacris – Featured Artist
- Princeton Lynah – Engineer
- Lonnie Rashid Lynn – Composer
- Juaquin Malphurs – Composer
- Sean Marlowe – Art Direction, Design
- Graham Marsh – Engineer
- Lakeem Mattox – Composer
- Carl McCormick – Composer
- Dijon McFarlane – Composer
- Meek Mill – Featured Artist
- Miguel – Featured Artist
- Mario Mims – Composer
- Leighton Morrison – A&R
- Faheem Najm – Composer
- Scott Naughton – Engineer
- Alec Newell – Engineer
- Michael Ray Nguyen-Stevenson – Composer
- Tyler Okonma – Composer
- Peter Pankey – Composer
- Jason Phillips – Composer
- Miguel Pimentel – Composer
- Planet VI – Featured Artist
- Lloyd Pollite – Composer
- Poobs – Engineer
- Pusha T – Featured Artist
- Angel Ramirez, Jr. – Engineer
- Kirk Randle – Composer
- Kevin Rashad – Engineer
- Toni Ray – Engineer
- William Roberts – Composer
- Rick Ross – Featured Artist
- The Rug – Engineer
- Matthew Samuels – Composer
- Glen Schlick – Mastering
- Schoolboy Q – Featured Artist
- Cody Sciarra – Engineer
- Verse Simmonds – Vocals (Background)
- Bobby Ray Simmons – Composer
- Tyree Simmons – Composer
- Jordan J. Sirhan – Engineer
- C. Smith – Composer
- Kev Spencer – Engineer
- The Streets – Executive Producer
- T-Pain – Featured Artist
- A. Taylor – Composer
- D. Thomas – Composer
- Theron Thomas – Composer
- Timothy Thomas – Composer
- Cameron Thomaz – Composer
- Terrence Thornton – Composer
- T.I. – Featured Artist
- Tm88 – Producer
- T-Minus – Producer
- Travis Porter – Featured Artist
- Orlando Tucker – Composer
- Tyga – Featured Artist
- Tyler, the Creator – Featured Artist
- V12 – Producer
- V12 the Hitman – Producer
- Javier Valverde – Engineer
- Waka Flocka Flame – Featured Artist
- Vic – Wainstein Engineer
- Wale – Featured Artist
- Summer Walker – A&R
- Finis "KY" White – Engineer, Mixing
- Nayvadius Wilburn – Composer
- Brian Williams – Composer
- Tyler Williams – Composer
- Wiz Khalifa – Featured Artist
- Wizzo – Engineer
- Zache Wolfe – Photography
- Donquez Woods – Composer
- Yo Gotti – Featured Artist
- Young Jeezy – Featured Artist

== Charts ==
=== Weekly charts ===
Chart (2012)	Peak position
US Billboard 200	15
US Top R&B/Hip-Hop Albums (Billboard)	3
US Top Rap Albums (Billboard)	2

=== Year-end charts ===
Chart (2012)	Position
US Top R&B/Hip-Hop Albums	100
