= Quality Street Music 2 =

Studio album by DJ Drama
- Released: July 22, 2016
- Recorded: 2014–15
- Genre: Hip-hop
- Length: 38:18
- Label: eOne
- Producer: DJ Drama (also exec.); Leighton Morrison (exec.); C4; Honorable C.N.O.T.E.; Don Cannon; FKi; J Nat Beats; League of Starz; Lil' C; The Mekanics; Syk Sense; Swiff D

DJ Drama chronology
Quality Street Music (2012)	Quality Street Music 2 (2016)	I'm Really Like That (2023)

Singles from Quality Street Music 2
- 1. "Wishing" Released: May 2, 2016

Quality Street Music 2 is the fifth studio album by American hip-hop disc jockey DJ Drama. It was released on July 22, 2016, by Entertainment One Music. The album serves as a sequel to Quality Street Music (2012). The album features guest appearances from T.I., Lil Uzi Vert, Lil Wayne, Chris Brown, Mac Miller, Post Malone, Skeme and Ty Dolla Sign, among others.

== Singles ==
The album lead single, called "Right Back" was released on September 29, 2014. The track features guest verses from southern hip-hop recording artists Jeezy, Young Thug and Rich Homie Quan, while the production was handled by The Mekanics and Syk Sense.

The album's second single, called "Wishing" was released on May 2, 2016. The track features guest vocals from American R&B recording artists Chris Brown and LyQuin, alongside a rapper Skeme, while the production was handled by J Nat Beats.

== Track listing ==
No.	Title	Writer(s)	Producer(s)	Length
1.	"Intro" (featuring Lil Wayne)	Tyree Simmons; Steve Thornton; Dwayne Carter, Jr.	Swiff D	2:55
2.	"Big Money (C4 Remix)" (featuring Rich Homie Quan, Lil Uzi Vert, and Skeme)	Simmons; Donald Cannon; Rodrequez Yancy; Dequantes Lamar; Lonnie Kimble	C4; Don Cannon	3:52
3.	"Wishing" (featuring Chris Brown, Skeme, and LyQuin)	Simmons; Kimble; Barron Murray, Jr.; Christopher Maurice Brown	J Nat Beats	4:12
4.	"Audible" (featuring WDNG Crshrs)	Simmons; Cannon; Quentin Miller; Thaddius Callaway	Cannon	2:05
5.	"Body for My Zipcode" (featuring Young Life, Dave East, and Freddie Gibbs)	Simmons; Donte Blacksher; Regis Bell; Jason Wilkinson; David Brewster; Fredrick Tipton	League of Starz	4:05
6.	"Can I" (featuring Young Thug and T.I.)	Simmons; Cordale Quinn; Clifford Harris, Jr.	Lil' C	3:59
7.	"Onyx" (featuring Ty Dolla $ign, Trey Songz, and August Alsina)	Simmons; Carlton Mays Jr.; Tyrone Griffin; Tremaine Neverson; August Alsina	Honorable C.N.O.T.E.	3:45
8.	"Camera" (featuring Lil Uzi Vert, FKi 1st, Mac Miller, and Post Malone)	Simmons; Trocon Roberts Jr.; Malcolm McCormick; Austin Post	FKi 1st	5:28
9.	"Back and Forth" (featuring Skeme and Yakki Divioshi)	Simmons; Mays Jr.; Kimble; Terez Davis	Honorable C.N.O.T.E.	3:42
10.	"Right Back" (featuring Jeezy, Young Thug, and Rich Homie Quan)	Simmons; Williams; Lamar; Michael Hernandez; Richard Duran; Joshua Scruggs; Jay Jenkins	The Mekanics; Syk Sense	4:03
Total length:				38:18

== Charts ==
Chart (2016)	Peak position
US Billboard 200	40
US Top R&B/Hip-Hop Albums (Billboard)	6
