= Gangsta Grillz: The Album (Vol. 2) =

Studio album by DJ Drama
- Released: May 19, 2009
- Recorded: 2007–2009
- Genre: Hip-hop
- Length: 57:40
- Labels: Aphilliates; Embassy; Grand Hustle; Atlantic
- Producers: T.I. (exec.); Jason Geter (exec.); V12 the Hitman; Drumma Boy; T.I.; DJ Khalil; Lil' C; Zaytoven; Christopher "Tricky" Stewart; The-Dream

DJ Drama chronology
Gangsta Grillz: The Album (2007)	Gangsta Grillz: The Album (Vol. 2) (2009)	Third Power (2011)

Singles from Gangsta Grillz: The Album (Vol. 2)
- 1. "Day Dreaming" Released: February 9, 2009; 2. "Ridiculous" Released: April 23, 2009

Professional ratings
Review scores
Source	Rating
AllMusic	2.5/5 stars
XXL	3/5 stars
The Smoking Section	3/5 stars

Gangsta Grillz: The Album Vol. 2 is the second studio album by American hip-hop disc jockey DJ Drama. It was released on May 19, 2009, by Aphilliates Music Group, Embassy Entertainment, Grand Hustle Entertainment and Atlantic Records.

== Background ==
DJ Drama said about the album:

I don't want to dramatize it too much – no pun intended, [But the album is] just bangers, something that can rock from beginning to end.

Guest appearances on the album include T.I., Young Dro, Sean P, Lonnie Mac, Ludacris, Willie the Kid, Busta Rhymes, Trey Songz, Gucci Mane, LA Da Darkman, Yung Joc, Bun B, Flo Rida, Mike Jones, Rick Ross, Trick Daddy, Ray J, Akon, Fabolous, Yo Gotti, OJ da Juiceman, Nas, Scarface, Marsha Ambrosius, The-Dream, Too Short, Styles P, Jovan Dais, Snoop Dogg, B.G., Juvenile, and Soulja Slim. The producers on the album include Zaytoven, Drumma Boy, Tricky Stewart, Cordale "Lil C" Quinn, and DJ Khalil, among others.

== Singles ==
The first single, "Day Dreaming", was leaked onto the internet on December 22, 2008. The song was produced by Drumma Boy and features Akon, Snoop Dogg, and T.I. The second single is "Ridiculous" produced by Zaytoven and features Gucci Mane, Yo Gotti, Lonnie Mac and OJ Da Juiceman.

== Track listing ==
The following track list was confirmed by Atlantic Records via their online store.

No.	Title	Producer(s)	Length
1.	"A-Town" (featuring T.I., Young Dro, Sean P, and Lonnie Mac)	Lil' C	4:03
2.	"We Must Be Heard" (featuring Ludacris, Willie the Kid, and Busta Rhymes)	V12 the Hitman	3:37
3.	"Love for Money" (featuring Trey Songz, Willie the Kid, Gucci Mane, La the Darkman, Yung Joc, Bun B, and Flo Rida)	The Runners	4:53
4.	"I'm Fresh" (featuring Mike Jones, Rick Ross, and Trick Daddy)	J.U.S.T.I.C.E. League	5:33
5.	"Day Dreaming" (featuring Akon, Snoop Dogg, and T.I.)	Drumma Boy	4:50
6.	"Sweat" (featuring Ray J, Fabolous, and LA the Darkman)	LT Moe	4:24
7.	"Ridiculous" (featuring Gucci Mane, Yo Gotti, Lonnie Mac, and OJ da Juiceman)	Zaytoven	6:20
8.	"Come Up Boys" (featuring LA the Darkman and Willie the Kid)	Don Cannon	2:27
9.	"Yacht Music" (featuring Nas, Willie the Kid, Scarface, and Marsha Ambrosius)	DJ Khalil	4:27
10.	"Tipper Love" (featuring The-Dream, LA the Darkman, and Too Short)	Christopher "Tricky" Stewart	4:34
11.	"Smoke" (featuring Gucci Mane, Willie the Kid, and Lonnie Mac)	V12 the Hitman	4:27
12.	"Pimpin' Ain't Easy" (featuring LA the Darkman, Bun B, Styles P, and Jovan Dais)	Tha Bizness	4:32
13.	"Gotta Get It" (featuring B.G., Juvenile, and Soulja Slim)	Drumma Boy	3:36

== Sales ==
The album sold 19,000 copies in its first week, and as of January 5, 2010 the album sold 41,022 copies.

== Charts ==
Chart (2009)	Peak position
US Billboard 200	26
US Top R&B/Hip-Hop Albums	5
US Top Rap Albums	4
US Comprehensive Albums	26
