= Jesus Piece (album) =

Studio album by the Game
- Released: December 11, 2012
- Recorded: 2011–2012
- Genres: West Coast hip-hop; gangsta rap
- Length: 56:37
- Labels: Reservoir; DGC; Interscope
- Producers: Cool & Dre; the Game; Stat Quo; Boi-1da; Dr. Dre; Black Metaphor; Dawaun Parker; Greg Fears Jr.; J. Rhodes; Jake One; K. Roosevelt; Matthew Burnett; the Maven Boys; S1; SAP; Stephen "Koz" Kozmeniuk; Yung Ladd

The Game chronology
The R.E.D. Album (2011)	Jesus Piece (2012)	Blood Moon: Year of the Wolf (2014)

Deluxe edition cover

Singles from Jesus Piece
- 1. "Celebration" Released: September 2, 2012; 2. "All That (Lady)" Released: February 19, 2013

Jesus Piece is the fifth studio album by American rapper the Game, released on December 11, 2012, by Reservoir Records, DGC Records and Interscope Records, his last release on both labels as he parted ways a year following. The album is also the final DGC Records album to be released as the label became inactive in 2013, before being permanently merged into Interscope's division and Game's previous label, Geffen Records (a Universal Music sister label under Interscope Geffen A&M) in September 2021.

Within a three-year gap between Game's third album, LAX (2008), and his follow-up, The R.E.D. Album (2011), before the latter was finally released in August 2011. The R.E.D. Album was a fall from his previous three released album sales, but became Game's third and final number one album on the US Billboard 200 chart. Shortly after the release of the long delayed album, Game announced he had begun work on his fifth studio album. The album was originally meant to be titled Soundtrack to Chaos, then was changed to F.I.V.E. (Fear is Victory's Evolution) and finally Jesus Piece becoming Game's first concept album.

Game explained the concept of Jesus Piece does not have a spiritual theme, but it would have a "gangster" theme of enjoying life while also having faith in God. Jesus Piece was Game's first album since the multi-platinum selling and critically acclaimed The Documentary to feature production from Dr. Dre. Game announced on social media that every Sunday leading up to the album that he would be dropping new music, which failed to make the album's final cut. Game compared the album's quality of production and high number of guests to his mentor Dr. Dre's 2001.

"Celebration" was released as the album's lead single. The song features additional vocals from fellow rappers Lil Wayne, Chris Brown, Tyga and Wiz Khalifa. "Celebration" managed to attain chart success, debuting at number 82 on the Billboard Hot 100. "All That (Lady)" featuring Big Sean, Lil Wayne, Fabolous and Jeremih would be released as the second single and peaked at number 48 on the Billboard Hot R&B/Hip-Hop Songs. Other guest appearances on the album came from Meek Mill, 2 Chainz, Rick Ross, Kanye West, Common, J. Cole, JMSN, King Chip, Trey Songz, Pusha T, Kendrick Lamar, Tank, K. Roosevelt, Jamie Foxx, Elijah Blake, Future and Young Jeezy.

The controversial cover for the deluxe edition of the album portrays an African-American Jesus. On the standard edition cover, Game pays homage to one of his older brothers, Jevon Danell Taylor, who was shot and killed at the age of 20. Upon release, the album received generally positive reviews, with most critics praising the production and guests on the album. The album debuted at number six on the Billboard 200 with first-week sales of 86,000 copies.

== Background and recording ==
The first glimpse seen of the Game's fifth studio album was through Twitter a couple of days before The R.E.D. Album was released. The Game posted a video of him in a studio session with 1500 or Nothin'. In the session, he titled the fifth LP Soundtrack to Chaos. The session showed them recording a song that was later released, called "Everywhere" which featured J. Black. To build hype, the Game released a mixtape called California Republic. The mixtape was released on April 6, 2012.

In early 2012, the Game changed the album's title to F.I.V.E.: Fear is Victory's Evolution. He also announced that Cool & Dre would be executive producing, while DJ Khaled was a co-executive producer. The Game changed the title of the album for the second time due to similarities with Trey Songz's Chapter V and 50 Cent's digital album. He told in an interview with DJ Skee that the album borrows its name from the title track featuring Kanye West, and it has a concept on enjoying life to the fullest while still believing in God. Jesus Piece stands as the Game's only concept record to date. He scrapped the years worth of material from the album sessions except for the song "Jesus Piece" and intended to change the whole album behind that one song. After this, the Game had 60 days to re-record the entire album, which included calling rappers that already recorded verses for the project (such as Lil Wayne and Rick Ross) having to come back in and re-record their verses to fit the album concept.

In an August 2012 interview with DJ Skee, the Game confirmed that Jesus Piece was scheduled for a release in the fourth quarter of 2012. He also hinted at another mixtape before the album releases and that he has more than 5,000 records on his computer that had yet to be released to the public.

The Game has also stated that the album was dedicated to rapper Lil JoJo, a Chicago rapper who was murdered on September 4, 2012.

== Cover artwork ==
=== Deluxe edition cover and controversy ===
The Game released a controversial artwork of the album via Instagram on October 21, 2012 and also announced the release date will be December 11. The cover, designed and illustrated by former Interscope art director Mike Saputo, portrays a dark-skinned Jesus in a stained glass window with a teardrop tattoo, a red bandanna around his mouth, and wearing a Jesus piece. The stained glass-inspired image shows Jesus sitting on a throne adorned with gang-related symbols. In the artwork, Jesus is holding a gold "Jesus Piece" chain and pointing to a symbol on his breast plate. The red bandana over his mouth is a reference to the Cedar Block Piru Bloods gang, to which Game is allegedly a member. The artwork has a slightly altered logo on the top, which features on all of Game's previous studio albums. The album's title Jesus Piece is stylized as Je5us Piece, depicting that it is Game's fifth studio album. Je5us Piece logo is styled after the iconic Louis Vuitton. The religious imagery of the art has gained mixed reactions and the ire of some fans who deem the work as blasphemous. Several celebrities praised the artwork, including Busta Rhymes, Mac Miller and Kevin Hart.

Game, himself, also defended the cover in an interview with MTV News. He states, "I did the album cover the way I wanted to. It embodies part of my career, my life; it’s all in that cover. You know, I love God, Jesus Christ is my savior and I’m still out here thuggin'. I know that might sound weird and that’s an awkward balance, but it’s my balance. I think that right before that person that wants to make judgments or pass judgment on my album cover, I think right before they do that, they should stop and they should look in the mirror and look at their own life." However, the Game decided to use the cover exclusively for the deluxe edition after the Roman Catholic Church and various Christians complained to Jimmy Iovine, co-founder of Interscope Records about the cover via several emails and phone calls, which Game says “got really crazy”. Complex named the album cover the fifteenth best cover of 2012.

On October 24, two days after revealing the cover, Game claimed that Christian rapper Lecrae texted him "out of the blue" and critiqued the artwork. Lecrae was concerned about the cover, not sure of how it could work with the lyrical content on the album, considering Game's status as a gangster rapper. After a brief exchange, both rappers wished each other luck. In January 2013, in an interview with Vice Media's Noisey, Lecrae responded, claiming that Game did not accurately explain the situation to him and that he was in no way of intentions to criticize him. He also went on to state that he was "here to serve people. I'm not here to wave my finger in people’s faces and point out to them how terrible they are or what I hate about them or anything along those lines. That's not my place. I'm in no position to condemn anybody. There's things I don't condone, and I talk about that, but at the same time, I would never just reach out to somebody and be like, "Yo man, I don't appreciate that," if I never met you. That's not my thing."

=== Standard cover ===
On November 12, an alternative cover for the standard edition of the album was released. This cover paid homage to one of the Game's older brothers, Jevon Danell Taylor, who died from gunshot wounds on May 21, 1995 at the age of 20.

== Guests and production ==
On October 31, 2012, Game stated that Common, J. Cole, Rick Ross, Lil Wayne, Future and Young Jeezy would be guests on the album. He also confirmed on his official Twitter account that he had recorded a song with Rihanna. DJ Premier confirmed that he will be working on the album. Game told Rap-Up TV that long time collaborator Lil Wayne will be featuring on the album on more than one record. On September 29, 2012, Game confirmed longstanding collaborator Lil Wayne will be featured on two songs and Maroon 5 lead singer Adam Levine would also appear. Game said in a Rolling Stone interview, "When everybody hears the Adam Levine record, I think they gonna go crazy". However the song did not make the final track list. On October 18, 2012, Game confirmed, he has worked with Jamie Foxx on the album. In early November 2 Chainz and Meek Mill were also confirmed as featured artists and Game also called the album his 2012 version of Dr. Dre's The Chronic 2001 as related to the number of features on the project. Dr. Dre and Dawaun Parker were also confirmed to have production while Kendrick Lamar confirmed to be featured on it.

The album features 24 guest appearances including skits performed by comedian Kevin Hart and rapper Stat Quo sprinkled throughout the album on tracks such as "Church" and "Freedom." Besides the prior names, other guests on the album include Big Sean, Fabolous, King Chip, Trey Songz, Pusha T, Tank and Jeremih. According to the original track listing released by the Game, features also included Wale, Trae tha Truth, Slim Thug, Paul Wall, Z-Ro and Scarface. However, the tracks these artists, "Stripper", "Rollin'" and "Murder" were cut from the final album due to sample clearance issues and were instead released as a part of Game's "Sunday Service" free music giveaway.

== Promotion ==
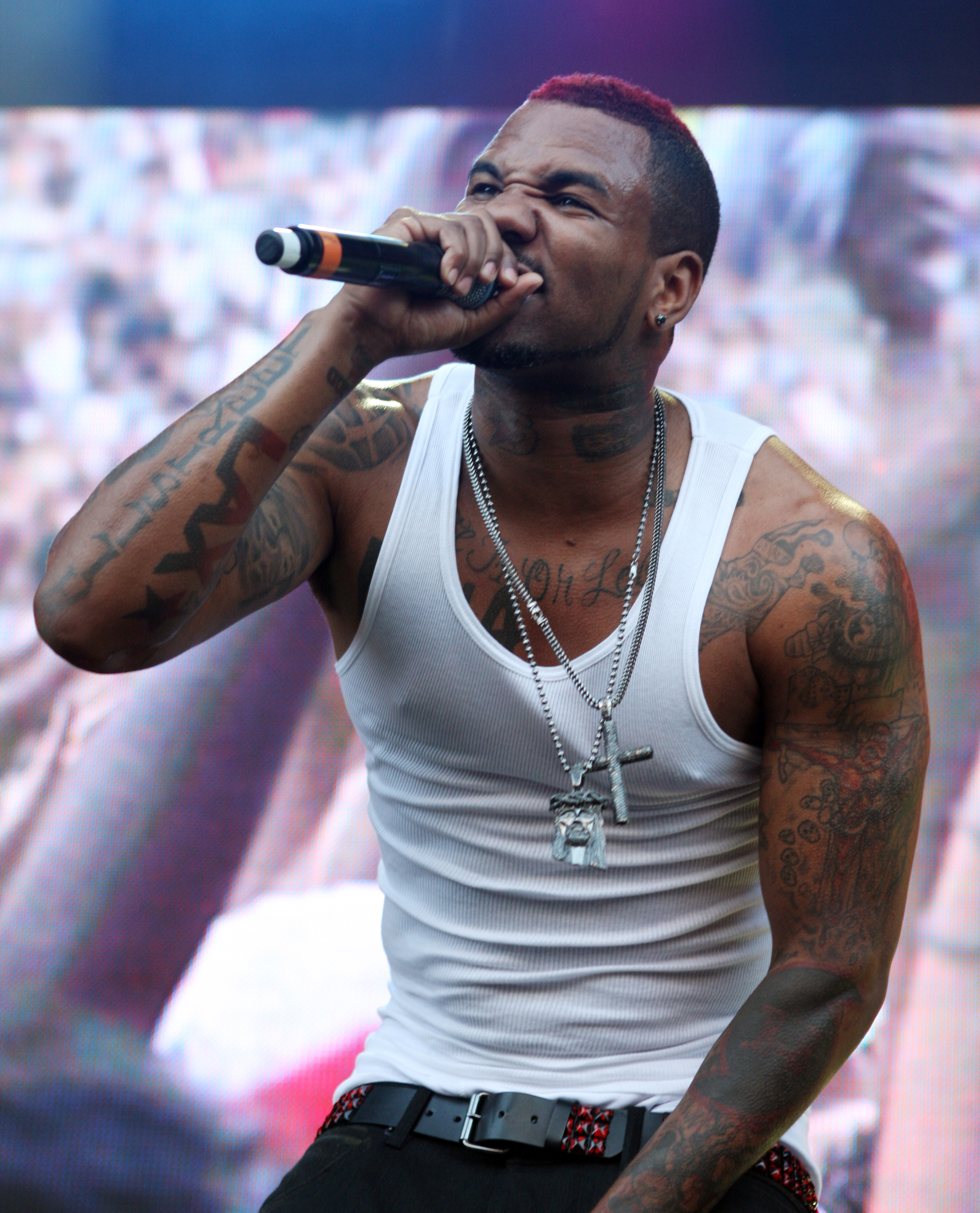
Game performing at Supafest 2011

Game announced on Twitter that every Sunday leading up to the album that he would drop something new to hold the fans over. All the songs are from the recording sessions for Jesus Piece. On October 28, 2012 he released the highly anticipated remix to "Celebration" featuring Bone Thugs-N-Harmony. On November 4, Game released a leftover track from the album, entitled "Holy Water". On November 11, Game released a track titled, "I Remember" featuring Young Jeezy and Future. The song was released directly as a video and was leaked onto Tyga's mixtape, Well Done 3, but with Tyga's verse replacing Young Jeezy's verse. For the fourth edition on November 18, he released a song entitled "Black Jesus" produced by SAP. The same day he also released "HVN4AGNGSTA" featuring Master P, which was originally supposed to be on Jesus Piece. On November 25, Game released the fifth edition of the series, a song entitled "Stripper" featuring Wale, which did not make the album due to an uncleared sample. In celebration of his birthday, Game released the song, "Judas Closet" on November 30. The song features rapper Nipsey Hussle and production from Timbaland. On December 2, Game released another cut record originally recorded for Jesus Piece, "Rollin'", featuring Kanye West, Trae Tha Truth, Z-Ro, Paul Wall and Slim Thug. On the seventh and final edition of Sunday Service the Game leaked the song "Murder" which features Scarface and Kendrick Lamar. The song was originally to be featured on Jesus Piece however it was cut due to sample clearing problems.

On December 7, 2012, the Game premiered snippets of the album on Big Boi's Neighborhood on Power 106. The weekend before the album release the Game held an album listening session in front of approximately 100 tastemakers, artists, bloggers and writers. In attendance were Stat Quo, Nu Jerzey Devil, Ty$, Clyde Carson, King Chip, Dre of Cool & Dre, Elliott Wilson among others. On December 10, 2012, the Game went onto Howard Stern's radio show to promote the album. The next day he would appear on DJ Skee's radio show to promote the album.

== Singles ==
"Celebration" is the album's lead single. It was produced by SAP and Cool and Dre. The song features additional vocals from fellow rappers Lil Wayne, Chris Brown, Tyga and Wiz Khalifa. "Celebration" received its first radio play on Los Angeles' Power 106 on August 22, 2012. The song samples Bone Thugs-n-Harmony's hit single "1st of tha Month". The music video, which was shot in Northridge, CA was released on September 18, 2012. "Celebration" managed to attain chart success, debuting at number 82 on the Billboard Hot 100, number 19 on the Hot Rap Songs chart and number 29 on the Hot R&B/Hip-Hop Songs chart. Game, Chris Brown, Tyga, Lil Wayne & Wiz Khalifa all appear in the video performing their part of the song. Game told MTV that the video was inspired by mentor Dr. Dre's hit single "Nuthin' but a 'G' Thang" featuring Snoop Dogg. Lil Wayne's contribution earned him his 109th chart entry, surpassing Elvis Presley's record for the most chart entries. Game posted a picture on his Twitter showing the word bone structured with cannabis. Game later confirmed that he is working in the studio with Bone Thugs-n-Harmony on a remix for "Celebration". On October 28, 2012, an official remix, featuring all five members of Bone Thugs-N-Harmony was released by Game. It was positively received by the critics.

On October 26, 2012, Game announced the first promotional single from the album, entitled "I Remember". Game revealed that he's enlisted Young Jeezy and Future for guest features on the second single. He explained that the song was originally leaked on Tyga's recent Well Done 3 mixtape, but he plans to release it with a new verse from Young Jeezy attached. Game confirmed that "I Remember", is a street record. Game confirmed that the single will be directly released as a video, and the audio version will be released later. The video was released on November 11, 2012 as the third release in the Sunday Service series.

The week of the album's release the song "All That (Lady)" which features Lil Wayne, Big Sean, Fabolous and Jeremih debuted at number 48 on the Billboard Hot R&B/Hip-Hop Songs chart. It had been rumored to be the second single. Then on February 19, 2013 the song was sent to radio as the second official single. The music video for "All That (Lady)" was released on November 1, 2013, Lil Wayne and Fabolous do not make appearances in the video.

In February 2013, the Game shot a music video for the song "Ali Bomaye" which features 2 Chainz and Rick Ross with production from Black Metaphor. The video was released on July 2, 2013. "Ali Bomaye" was featured on the soundtrack to the video game Grand Theft Auto V. The song has since peaked at number 51 on the Billboard Hot R&B/Hip-Hop Songs.

== Critical reception ==
Professional ratings
Aggregate scores
Source	Rating
Metacritic	66/100
Review scores
Source	Rating
AllHipHop	8/10
AllMusic	3.5/5 stars
Los Angeles Times	2.5/4 stars
Pitchfork	6.0/10
Rolling Stone	3.5/5 stars
The Source	4.5/5 stars
Spin	3.5/4 stars
USA Today	3.5/4 stars
The Washington Post	(favorable)
XXL	(XL)

Jesus Piece received generally positive reviews from contemporary music critics. At Metacritic, which assigns a normalized rating out of 100 to reviews from mainstream critics, the album received an average score of 66, which indicates "generally favorable reviews", based on 13 reviews.

Artistdirect's Rick Florino praised the album for playing out like a classic Gangster flick, concluding with: "Ultimately, tempering bullet-ridden tales and redemptive prayers, Game unleashes his best work to date and a landmark for hip hop." The Michigan Daily praised the album for its production and guest features and Game for crafting a project that contains substance with its religious theme. Steve Jones of USA Today commended Game for using various flows to tell his stories with spiritual influences. XXL praised the production and content throughout, stating "The Game framed a praiseworthy album blessed with sterling features that imparts many believers’ choice, including his own, to keep their faith without altering their nature." Sarah Godfrey of The Washington Post said the record had "A few songs stray from the main concept, but for the most part, Game's latest effort sticks to its compelling theme and is an interesting look at the religious gray area that lies between wearing a diamond-studded gold Jesus piece around one's neck with little thought to its significance and sitting in church every Sunday." AllHipHop commended the Game for delivering the type of music his fans clamor for, but shifting gears at the appropriate time to stretch his content and show diversity in his lyrics.

Jayson Greene of Pitchfork gave the record a less stellar review putting it down as nothing new from Game and only praising the production and guest list. He did find it less over-crowded than The R.E.D. Album. Phillip Mlynar of Spin commented negatively of the guest features and claimed Game strays from his own concept too often. AllMusic's David Jeffries said that Game managed to deliver his message throughout the album despite it being messy. On December 7, 2012, Game uploaded a screenshot of text messages between him and Dr. Dre on Twitter, where Dr. Dre congratulated and commended Game for the album and specifically praised the song "All That (Lady)."

=== Sales and accolades ===
Jesus Piece was initially expected to sell between 75,000 and 80,000 copies in its first week, but projections increased between 85,000 and 90,000 copies. The album debuted at number six on the Billboard 200 with first-week sales of 86,000 copies. It dropped to number 37 in its second week with sales of 35,000 copies. By March 2013, the album had sold 213,000 copies in the United States.

Jesus Piece was ranked third on The Source's annual list of the best rap albums for 2012, behind Nas' Life Is Good and Kendrick Lamar's Good Kid, M.A.A.D City. It was also ranked number 45 among the 50 best albums of 2012 by Complex. Insanul Ahmed of Complex said, "the production is on point and Game is compelling when rapping about trying to balance the life as a thug who still believes in God. However, the songs aren't heavy-handed and definitely not preachy. Game works the religious theme into his rhymes effortlessly. Whereas on previous efforts, his occasional church, Bible, and Jesus references went unnoticed, here they add a common thread to the album."

When asked about his overall discography, Game is quick to hold it down for Jesus Piece. Positioning the 2012 album as his third-best body of work, Game seems genuinely saddened at its neglect: "N***as slept on Jesus Piece. That's an album I dug into, and like, that shit is sonically amazing from front to back. The concept, that's raw hip-hop. That's my third favorite album."

== Track listing ==
No.	Title	Writer(s)	Producer(s)	Length
1.	"Scared Now" (featuring Meek Mill)	Jayceon Taylor; Byron Forest II; Robert Williams; Maurice "Kenoe" Jordan	Black Metaphor	4:59
2.	"Ali Bomaye" (featuring 2 Chainz and Rick Ross)	Taylor; Forest II; Tauheed Epps; William Roberts II; Jordan; Florence Welch; Paul Epworth	Black Metaphor	6:12
3.	"Jesus Piece" (featuring Common and Kanye West)	Taylor; Matthew Samuels; Stephen "Koz" Kozmeniuk; Brett Ryan; Kanye West; Lonnie Lynn, Jr.	Kozmeniuk; the Maven Boys	3:53
4.	"Pray" (featuring J. Cole and JMSN)	Taylor; Andre Lyon; Jermaine Cole; Christian Berishaj; Marcello Valenzano	Cool & Dre	4:58
5.	"All That (Lady)" (featuring Lil Wayne, Big Sean, Jeremih, and Fabolous)	Taylor; Dwayne Carter Jr.; John Jackson; Sean Anderson; Jeremih Felton; Lyon; Valenzano	Cool & Dre	3:34
6.	"Heaven's Arms"	Taylor; Lyon; Valenzano; Benton	Cool & Dre	4:05
7.	"Name Me King" (featuring Pusha T)	Taylor; Jonathan "SAP" King; Terrence Thornton; Benton; Welch; Isabella Summers	SAP	4:01
8.	"See No Evil" (featuring Kendrick Lamar and Tank)	Taylor; Durrell Babbs; Kendrick Duckworth; Samuels; Matthew Burnett; Liz Rodrigues	Boi-1da; Burnett (co.)	4:44
9.	"Can't Get Right" (featuring K. Roosevelt)	Taylor; Lyon; Valenzano; Moore	Cool & Dre	4:57
10.	"Hallelujah" (featuring Jamie Foxx)	Taylor; Jacob Dutton; George Jordan; Benton	Jake One	4:33
11.	"Freedom" (featuring Elijah Blake)	Taylor; Antwan Thompson; Benton; Dave Crawford; Charles Mann	Amadeus	5:46
12.	"Celebration" (featuring Chris Brown, Tyga, Lil Wayne, and Wiz Khalifa)	Taylor; Christopher Brown; Michael Stevenson; Carter Jr.; Cameron Thomaz; S. Jean; King	SAP; Cool & Dre (add.)	4:48
Total length:				56:37

Deluxe edition (bonus tracks)
No.	Title	Writer(s)	Producer(s)	Length
5.	"Church" (featuring King Chip and Trey Songz)	Taylor; K.R. Moore; Charles Worth; Stanley Benton; Tremaine Neverson	K. Roosevelt	6:07
14.	"I Remember" (featuring Young Jeezy and Future)	Taylor; Brian Pickens; Jay Jenkins; Nayvadius Wilburn; Lyon	Yung Ladd; Cool & Dre (add.)	4:41
15.	"Blood Diamonds"	Taylor; Larry Griffin Jr.; Justin Rhodes	S1; J. Rhodes; Greg Fears, Jr. (add.)	4:16
Total length:				71:34

iTunes bonus track
No.	Title	Writer(s)	Producer(s)	Length
16.	"Dead People"	Taylor; Andre Young	Dr. Dre	4:19

Best Buy bonus tracks
No.	Title	Writer(s)	Producer(s)	Length
16.	"Blood of Christ"	Taylor; Dawaun Parker	Parker	5:06
17.	"Holy Water"	Taylor; King; M. Lawrence	SAP	3:22

Notes

- "Ali Bomaye" & "Freedom" are shortened to 5:21 and 4:45 on the clean version of the album, respectively.

Sample credits

- "Ali Bomaye" contains a sample of "Seven Devils" performed by Florence + the Machine.
- "Pray" contains a sample of "I'm Not Human at All" performed by Sleep Party People.
- "All That (Lady)" contains a sample of "Lady" performed by D'Angelo.
- "Name Me King" contains a sample of "Breath of Life" performed by Florence + the Machine.
- "Hallelujah" contains samples of "We See God With the Eyes of Our Souls" performed by the Dynamic Reverend Maceo Woods and the Christian Tabernacle Choir.
- "Freedom" contains a sample of "Say You Love Me Too" performed by Charles Mann.
- "Celebration" contains a sample of "1st of tha Month" performed by Bone Thugs-n-Harmony.
- "Holy Water" contains a sample of "Changes" performed by Mala.

== Personnel ==
Album credits are adapted from AllMusic.

- Frank Abraham - bass
- Jericho Adams - publicity
- Tunji Balogun - A&R
- Stacy Barthe - background vocals
- Steve Baughman - mixing
- Black Metaphor - producer
- Boi-1DA - producer
- Matthew Burnett - producer
- Daphne Chen - violin
- Lauren Chipman - viola
- Lincoln Cleary - piano
- DJ Mormile - A&R
- Dr. Dre - producer
- Richard Dodd - cello
- Todd Douglas - music business affairs
- BJ Frogozo - marketing
- Game - executive producer, primary artist
- Brian "Big Bass" Gardner - mastering
- Eric Gorfain - guitar, violin
- Alicia Graham - A&R
- Kevin Hart - skit
- Susan Hilderley - music business affairs
- Jake One - producer
- JMSN - background vocals
- Sly Jordan - background vocals
- Stephen Kozmeniuk - producer
- Yung Ladd - producer
- Jonathan Mannion - photography
- Maven Boys - producer
- Greg Miller - publicity
- Malachi Mott - post production
- Ruben Rivera - mixing assistant
- Blair Robinson - vocals
- Don Robinson - marketing
- Liz Rodrigues - vocals
- S1 - producer
- J.Rhodes - producer
- Jason Sangerman - marketing
- Kam Sangha - producer
- Mike Saputo - Art Direction, Design & Illustration
- Vlad Sepetov - Standard edition cover art
- Stat Quo - executive producer, skit
- Shawn Suggs - A&R
- Antwan "Amadeus" Thompson - producer
- Andrew Van Meter - producer

== Charts ==
=== Weekly charts ===
Chart (2012)	Peak position
Belgian Albums (Ultratop Wallonia)	158
Scottish Albums (Official Charts)	79
UK Albums (Official Charts)	76
UK Album Downloads (Official Charts)	18
UK R&B Albums (Official Charts)	6
Canadian Albums (Billboard)	16
US Billboard 200	6
US Top R&B/Hip-Hop Albums (Billboard)	1
US Top Rap Albums (Billboard)	1

=== Year-end charts ===
Chart (2013)	Position
US Billboard 200	123
US Top R&B/Hip-Hop Albums	24
US Top Rap Albums	16

== Release history ==
Region	Date	Label(s)	Formats
Germany	December 11, 2012	Interscope	Digital download, CD
Australia	December 11, 2012	Interscope	Digital download, CD
Ireland	December 11, 2012	Interscope	Digital download, CD
United Kingdom	December 11, 2012	Interscope	Digital download, CD
United States	December 11, 2012	Interscope	Digital download, CD
Canada	December 11, 2012	Interscope	Digital download, CD
