= Gangsta Grillz: The Album =

Studio album by DJ Drama
- Released: December 4, 2007
- Recorded: 2005–2007
- Genre: Hip-hop
- Length: 1:15:03
- Labels: Aphilliates Music Group; Embassy; Grand Hustle; Atlantic
- Producers: T.I. (exec.); Jason Geter (exec.); Don Cannon; Dame Grease; Khao; Jazze Pha; Drumma Boy; The Neptunes; Mr. Porter; Lil' Jon; The Runners; Nottz; Neenyo; Detroit Red; UNI

DJ Drama chronology
Gangsta Grillz: The Album (2007)	Gangsta Grillz: The Album (Vol. 2) (2009)

Singles from Gangsta Grillz: The Album
- 1. "5000 Ones" Released: October 23, 2007; 2. "The Art of Storytellin' Part 4" Released: 2008

Professional ratings
Review scores
Source	Rating
AllMusic	4/5 stars
AllHipHop	6.5/10 stars
HipHopDX	3/5 stars
Pitchfork Media	(4.5/10)
RapReviews	(8.0/10)
DJBooth.net	4/5 stars

Gangsta Grillz: The Album is the debut album by the hip-hop artist DJ Drama, released on December 4, 2007, by Aphilliates Music Group, Embassy Entertainment, Grand Hustle Entertainment and Atlantic Records.

== Singles ==
The lead single from the album was "5000 Ones". The second single of the album was "The Art of Storytellin' Part 4". Guest appearances include Nelly, T.I., Young Jeezy, OutKast, Willie the Kid, Lil Jon, Lil Wayne, B.G., La the Darkman, 8Ball & MJG, Lil Boosie, Young Buck, Lloyd Banks, Tony Yayo, Project Pat, Twista, Yo Gotti, Rick Ross, Freeway, Yung Joc, Jadakiss, Jim Jones, Young Dro, Big Kuntry King, Webbie, Paul Wall, Slim Thug, Lil’ Keke, Killa Kyleon, and many others.

== Commercial performance ==
Gangsta Grillz: The Album debuted and peaked at number 26 on the U.S. Billboard 200 chart and sold about 49,000 units in its debut week.

== Track listing ==
No.	Title	Producer(s)	Length
1.	"The Setup"		2:59
2.	"Gangsta Grillz" (featuring Lil' Jon)	Drumma Boy	1:28
3.	"Feds Takin' Pictures" (featuring Young Jeezy, Willie the Kid, Jim Jones, Rick Ross, Young Buck and T.I.)	Dame Grease	4:20
4.	"Keep It Gangsta" (featuring Yo Gotti, Webbie and Lil' Boosie)	Khao; Zaytoven	4:30
5.	"Cannon (Remix)" (featuring Lil' Wayne, Willie the Kid, Freeway and T.I.)	Don Cannon	4:48
6.	"Makin' Money Smokin'" (featuring Willie the Kid and La the Darkman)	Carter Bradley; UNI	4:17
7.	"5000 Ones" (featuring Nelly, T.I., Yung Joc, Willie the Kid, Young Jeezy, Diddy and Twista)	Jazze Pha	5:03
8.	"The Art of Storytellin' Part 4" (featuring Outkast and Marsha Ambrosius)	Don Cannon	4:57
9.	"Katt Williams Interlude" (with Katt Williams)		1:12
10.	"187" (featuring Project Pat, B.G. and 8Ball and MJG)	Drumma Boy	4:07
11.	"The Mad DJ" (with the Madd Rapper)		1:28
12.	"Beneath the Diamonds" (featuring Devin the Dude, Twista, La the Darkman and Denaun Porter)	Mr. Porter	4:01
13.	"Talk Bout Me" (featuring Young Buck, Lloyd Banks and Tony Yayo)	Nottz	4:15
14.	"No More" (featuring Lloyd, Willie the Kid and T.I.)	Don Cannon	3:41
15.	"Diddy Interlude" (with Diddy)		1:04
16.	"Throw Ya Sets Up" (featuring Yung Joc, Willie the Kid, Jadakiss and La the Darkman)	Don Cannon	4:15
17.	"Aye" (featuring Young Dro and Big Kuntry King)	The Runners	4:35
18.	"Grillz Gleamin'" (featuring Lil' Scrappy, Bohagon, Diamond and Princess)	Lil' Jon	4:07
19.	"Gettin' Money" (featuring Paul Wall, Killa Kyleon, Lil' Keke & Slim Thug)	Neenyo; Detroit Red	3:58
20.	"Outro"		0:53
21.	"Cheers" (featuring Pharrell and Clipse)	Khao	4:52
Total length:			1:15:03

== Charts ==
=== Weekly charts ===
Chart (2007)	Peak position
US Billboard 200	26
US Comprehensive Albums (Billboard)	29
US Top R&B/Hip-Hop Albums (Billboard)	3
US Top Rap Albums (Billboard)	2
US Indie Store Album Sales (Billboard)	7

=== Year-end charts ===
Chart (2008)	Position
US Top R&B/Hip-Hop Albums (Billboard)	48
