= Third Power (album) =

2011 studio album by DJ Drama

Studio album by DJ Drama
- Released: October 11, 2011
- Recorded: 2011
- Genre: Hip-hop
- Length: 48:39
- Labels: eOne; Aphilliates
- Producers: Drumma Boy; Cardiak; Akon; Mike Will Made It; P-Nazty; V2 the Hitman; Dawty Music; Young Yonny; Nard & B; A-Traxx; Giorgio Tuinfort; Squat

DJ Drama chronology
Gangsta Grillz: The Album (Vol. 2) (2009)	Third Power (2011)	Quality Street Music (2012)

Singles from Third Power
- 1. "Oh My" Released: May 13, 2011

Professional ratings
Review scores
Source	Rating
AllMusic	3.5/5 stars
HipHopDX	3.5/5 stars
XXL	3/5 stars

Third Power is the third album by the American hip-hop artist DJ Drama, released on October 11, 2011. It marks his first project outside of the Gangsta Grillz series. Featured guests on the album include Fabolous, Wiz Khalifa, Roscoe Dash, Freddie Gibbs, Young Jeezy, Wale, J. Cole, Chris Brown, Pusha T, French Montana, Crooked I, B.o.B, Gucci Mane, Ya Boy, Akon, Trey Songz, and Big Sean, among others.

== Background ==
Initially, the album was set to be titled Gangsta Grillz: The Album (Vol. 3), continuing the sequential titles of his previous two releases: however, in an interview at the BET Awards on July 8, 2011, he revealed that he had changed the album's title to Third Power. In a press release, DJ Drama spoke about how he felt the album was his best to date: he felt it was his "biggest and best yet" and that it represents three generations of hip-hop: "the music I came up on, the movements that I was a part of, and a whole new generation of Hip-Hop that is changing the face of music". The album leaked October 8, 2011.

== Singles ==
The album's lead single, "Oh My", was released as a digital download on June 17, 2011. The song features guest appearances from American hip-hop artists Fabolous, Wiz Khalifa and Roscoe Dash, and features production from record producer Drumma Boy. The song debuted at number one-hundred on the US Billboard Hot 100 on the week ending August 6, 2011, becoming DJ Drama's first appearance on the chart, and also peaked at number nineteen on the Hot R&B/Hip-Hop Songs chart and number twelve on the Hot Rap Songs charts in the United States, also becoming his highest peaking song on both of these charts. It has since peaked at #95 on the Hot 100. The official remix to "Oh My" features Trey Songz, 2 Chainz, & Big Sean. On September 13, 2011 it was revealed "Never See You Again" featuring Wale & Talia Coles would be the album's second single. However, "Ain't No Way Around It" featuring Future was released instead, and it peaked at #98 on the Hot R&B/Hip-Hop Songs chart. After the release of Third Power, "Undercover" featuring Chris Brown and J. Cole debuted at #15 on the Bubbling Under R&B/Hip-Hop Songs chart.

== Track listing ==
No.	Title	Writer(s)	Producer(s)	Length
1.	"Oh My" (featuring Fabolous, Roscoe Dash, and Wiz Khalifa)	Tyree Simmons; Christopher Gholson; John Jackson; Jeffery Johnson, Jr.; Cameron Thomaz	Drumma Boy	4:23
2.	"Rough" (featuring Young Jeezy and Freddie Gibbs)	Simmons; Antoine Kearney; Jay Jenkins; Fredrick Tipton	Lil' Lody	3:17
3.	"Lay Low" (featuring Young Chris, Meek Mill, and Freeway)	Simmons; Carl McCormick; Christopher Ries; Robert Williams; Leslie Pridgen	Cardiak	4:42
4.	"Ain't No Way Around It" (featuring Future)	Simmons; Michael Williams II; Pierre Slaughter; Nayvadius Willburn	Mike Will Made It; P-Nazty	3:25
5.	"Undercover" (featuring Chris Brown and J. Cole)	Simmons; Mack Loggins; Christopher Brown; Jermaine Cole	V12 the Hitman	3:50
6.	"Everything that Glitters" (featuring Pusha T and French Montana)	Simmons; Terrence Thornton; Karim Kharbouch	A-Traxx	3:29
7.	"Me & My Money" (featuring Gucci Mane)	Simmons; Gholson; Radric Davis	Drumma Boy	4:11
8.	"Never See You Again" (featuring Talia Coles and Wale)	Simmons; Victan Edmund; Talia Coles; Olubowale Akintimehin	Dawty Music	4:18
9.	"Self Made" (featuring Red Café and Yo Gotti)	Simmons; Ronald Ferebee, Jr.; Jermaine Denny; Mario Mims	Young Yonny	3:14
10.	"Take My City" (featuring B.o.B and Crooked I)	Simmons; Bernard Rosser, Jr.; Brandon Rackley; Bobby Ray Simmons, Jr.; Dominick Wickliffe	Nard & B	4:08
11.	"Lock Down" (with Ya Boy featuring Akon)	Giorgio Tuinfort; William Crawford; Aliaune Thiam	Tuinfort	4:37
12.	"Oh My (Remix)" (featuring Trey Songz, 2 Chainz, and Big Sean)	Simmons; Gholson; Tremaine Neverson; Tauheed Epps; Sean Anderson	Drumma Boy	4:59
Total length:				48:39

Best Buy and iTunes Store bonus track
No.	Title	Writer(s)	Producer(s)	Length
13.	"Hand of God" (with Maino)	Simmons; Jermaine Coleman	Squat	4:31
Total length:				52:70

Sample credits

- "Never See You Again", contains a sample of "Take Me to the Mardi Gras", as performed by Bob James, "Tha Light", as performed by Common, "Love's Gonna Get'cha (Material Love)", as performed by Boogie Down Productions and "Never See You Again", as performed by Talia Coles featuring KO Stiggity.

== Charts ==
Chart (2011)	Peak position
U.S. Billboard 200	42
U.S. Billboard Top R&B/Hip-Hop Albums	7
U.S. Billboard Top Rap Albums	6
U.S. Billboard Independent Albums	7
