= We in This Bitch =

2012 single by Ludacris, T.I., Jeezy, DJ Drama, Future

Single by DJ Drama featuring Future, Young Jeezy, T.I. and Ludacris

from the album Quality Street Music
- Released: February 29, 2012
- Recorded: 2012
- Length: 4:01
- Label: Entertainment One
- Songwriters: Tyree Simmons; Nayvadius Wilburn; Jay Jenkins; Clifford Harris; Christopher Bridges; Daniel Johnson; Jeremy Coleman
- Producers: Kane Beatz; JMIKE (co.)

DJ Drama singles chronology
"Oh My" (2011)	"We in This Bitch" (2012)	"My Moment" (2012)

Future singles chronology
"Go Harder" (2011)	"We in This Bitch" (2012)	"Turn on the Lights" (2012)

Young Jeezy singles chronology
"Leave You Alone" (2012)	"We in This Bitch" (2012)	"Keys To The City" (2012)

T.I. singles chronology
"Magic" (2012)	"We in This Bitch" (2012)	"Love This Life" (2012)

Ludacris singles chronology
"Wet the Bed" (2011)	"We in This Bitch" (2012)	"Jingalin" (2012)

Music video
- "We in This Bitch" on YouTube

"We in This Bitch", censored version known as "We In This", is a song by American hip hop artist DJ Drama. The song was released on February 29, 2012, as the lead single from Drama's fourth studio album Quality Street Music (2012) and was released on the independent record label Entertainment One. The posse cut was produced by Kane Beatz and features guest appearances from southern rappers Future, Young Jeezy, T.I. and Ludacris. "We in This Bitch" was written by the four rappers and DJ Drama, along with the producer of the song Kane Beatz and Jeremy Coleman. The song peaked at number 68 on the Hot R&B/Hip-Hop Songs. An official remix of the song featuring Drake and Future was released in May 2012.

== Remix ==
"We in This Bitch 1.5"

Promotional single by DJ Drama featuring Future and Drake

from the album Quality Street Music
- Released: September 4, 2012
- Recorded: 2012
- Length: 3:23
- Label: Entertainment One
- Songwriters: Tyree Simmons, Nayvadius Wilburn, Aubrey Graham
- Producers: Kane Beatz, JMIKE (co.)

DJ Drama chronology
"My Moment" (2012)	"We in This Bitch 1.5" (2012)	"Never Die" (2012)

Future chronology
Turn On the Lights (2012)	We in This Bitch 1.5 (2012)	Neva End (2012)

Drake chronology
Diced Pineapples (2012)	We in This Bitch 1.5 (2012)	Fuckin' Problems (2012)

The song was officially remixed and released on May 11, 2012, titled "We in This Bitch 1.5". The song features some new guest appearances from Canadian hip hop recording artist Drake and a verse from Future (since on the original version has only the chorus). The remix became available to purchase on iTunes on September 4, 2012.

== Music video ==
The music video, directed by Benny Boom, was released on May 6, 2012.

== Charts ==
Chart (2011–12)	Peak position
US Billboard Hot R&B/Hip-Hop Songs	68

== Release ==
Country	Date	Version	Format	Label
United States	February 29, 2012	Original version	Digital download	Entertainment One
United States	September 4, 2012	Official remix	Digital download	Entertainment One
