= Day Dreaming (DJ Drama song) =

2009 hip hop single

Single by DJ Drama featuring Akon, Snoop Dogg and T.I.

from the album Gangsta Grillz: The Album (Vol. 2)
- Released: January 27, 2009; February 9, 2009 (iTunes)
- Recorded: 2008
- Genre: Hip hop
- Length: 4:51; 3:46 (radio edit)
- Label: Aphilliates; Embassy; Grand Hustle; Atlantic
- Songwriters: Calvin Broadus; Christopher Gholson; Clifford Harris; Aliaune Thiam
- Producer: Drumma Boy

DJ Drama singles chronology
| "Love for Money" (2008) | "Day Dreaming" (2009) | "Ridiculous" (2009) |

Akon singles chronology
| "Beautiful" (2009) | "Day Dreaming" (2009) | "Stuck with Each Other" (2009) |

Snoop Dogg singles chronology
| "Bottle Pop" (2009) | "Day Dreaming" (2009) | "Hot Girl" (2009) |

T.I. singles chronology
| "Dead and Gone" (2009) | "Day Dreaming" (2009) | "Remember Me" (2009) |

"Day Dreaming" is a song by American hip hop artist DJ Drama. The song serves as the lead single from his second studio album Gangsta Grillz: The Album (Vol. 2). The hip hop song, produced by Drumma Boy, features guest vocals from American singer Akon, as well as American rappers Snoop Dogg and T.I. The song was released onto iTunes on February 9, 2009. Originally, the song was meant for Akon's album Freedom, under the title "Go Go Dancer". The song peaked at #33 in New Zealand and #59 in Sweden, becoming DJ Drama's only entry in those countries.

In the song, Akon makes a reference to the "Shirley Temple", a non-alcoholic cocktail (mocktail) named after the former child actress and diplomat; Akon claimed in an interview that he subsisted on Shirley Temples in lieu of alcoholic drinks as he is otherwise forbidden from drinking them as a devout Muslim and a teetotaller.

== Music video ==
The song’s music video was filmed in Los Angeles and directed by Rage. The video was released to MTV's Sucker Free on February 25, 2009. The video features cameo appearances by Lil Jon, Rich Boy, Red Cafe, Young Dro, Mac Boney, Jay Rock, Big Kuntry King, Yung L.A., Glasses Malone, Killer Mike, DeRay Davis, JR Get Money, L.A. The Darkman, B.o.B, Alfamega, Xtaci, Drumma Boy, DJ Trendsetter Sense and JabbaWockeeZ.

== Charts ==
| Chart (2009) | Peak position |
|---|---|
| Sweden (Sverigetopplistan) | 59 |
| New Zealand (Recorded Music NZ) | 33 |
| US Hot R&B/Hip-Hop Songs (Billboard) | 88 |
| US Rhythmic Airplay (Billboard) | 24 |
