= Wishing (DJ Drama song) =

Single by DJ Drama featuring Chris Brown, Skeme and LyQuin

from the album Quality Street Music 2
- Released: May 2, 2016
- Recorded: 2015
- Genre: R&B; hip hop
- Length: 4:15
- Label: Generation Now; eOne
- Songwriters: Tyree Simmons; Christopher Brown; Lonnie Kimble; Barron Murray, Jr.; Jonathan Joseph
- Producer: J Nat Beats

DJ Drama singles chronology
"Right Back" (2014)	"Wishing" (2016)	"Nasty" (2019)

Chris Brown singles chronology
"Drifting" (2016)	"Wishing" (2016)	"Grass Ain't Greener" (2016)

Skeme singles chronology
"Red Coupe" (2016)	"Wishing" (2016)	"I Remember" (2017)

LyQuin singles chronology
"Wishing" (2016)	"Smoke Sumn" (2016)

Music video
- "Wishing" on YouTube

"Wishing" is a song by American hip hop record producer DJ Drama. It was released as a digital download on May 2, 2016, as the lead single from fifth studio album Quality Street Music 2 (2016). The song features guest vocals from American singer and rapper Chris Brown, and American rappers Skeme and LyQuin. The song contains a sample of the song "Disrespectful" by Trey Songz and Mila J from his sixth studio album Trigga (2014).

== Music video ==
On May 26, 2016, DJ Drama uploaded the music video for "Wishing", directed by Eavvon O'Neal, on his YouTube and Vevo account. The music video features a cameo appearance from 50 Cent.

== Remix ==
On September 28, 2016, a remix was released that featured DJ Drama, Chris Brown, Fabolous, Trey Songz, Tory Lanez and Jhené Aiko.

== Charts ==
"Wishing" peaked at number 77 on the Billboard Hot 100, becoming DJ Drama's highest-charting single.

=== Weekly charts ===
Chart (2016)	Peak position
US Billboard Hot 100	77
US Hot R&B/Hip-Hop Songs (Billboard)	29
US R&B/Hip-Hop Airplay (Billboard)	8
US Rhythmic Airplay (Billboard)	30

=== Year-end charts ===
Chart (2016)	Position
US Hot R&B/Hip-Hop Songs (Billboard)	86

== Certifications ==
Region	Certification	Certified units/sales
New Zealand (RMNZ)	Gold	15,000^{‡}
United States (RIAA)	Gold	500,000^{‡}
^{‡} Sales+streaming figures based on certification alone.

== Release history ==
Region	Date	Format	Label	Ref.
United States	May 2, 2016	Digital download	Generation Now; eOne	
United Kingdom	May 6, 2016	Digital download	Generation Now; eOne	
