= Willie the Kid (rapper) =

American rapper (born 1985)

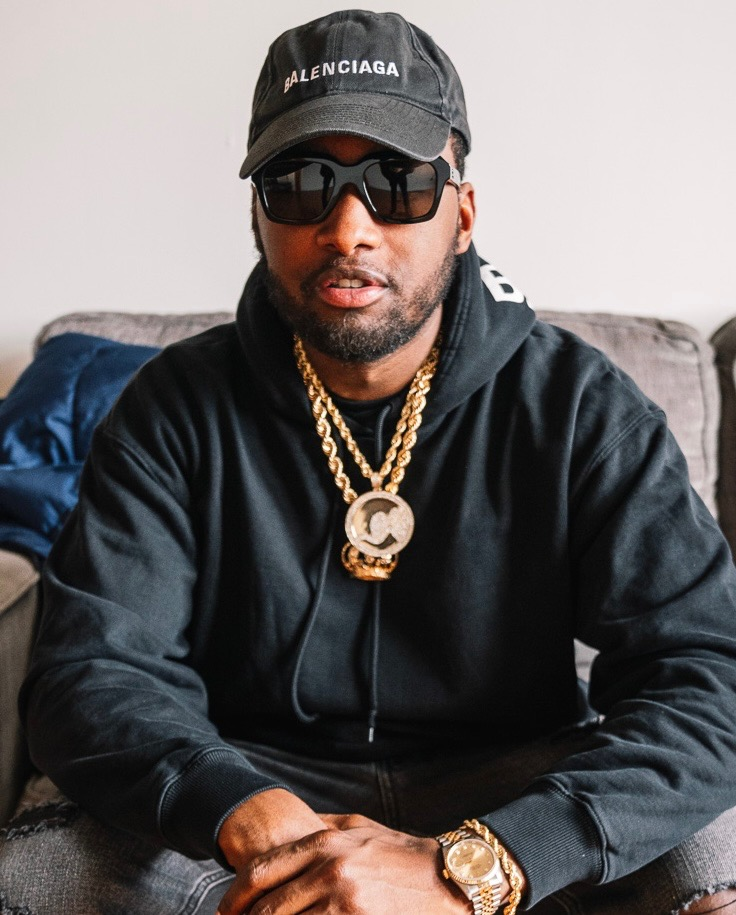
- Willie The Kid in 2025

Background information
- Also known as: The Fly; TCP (The Crown Prince)
- Born: Willie Jackson; September 25, 1985 (age 40); Grand Rapids, Michigan, U.S.
- Genres: Midwestern hip-hop
- Occupations: Rapper; songwriter; entrepreneur
- Years active: 2006–present
- Labels: The Fly; Asylum; Embassy; Aphilliates
- Website: watchthefly.com

Willie Jackson (born September 25, 1985), known professionally as Willie the Kid, is an American rapper and entrepreneur from Grand Rapids, Michigan. He made his debut as a founding member of the Aphilliates, alongside DJ Drama and Don Cannon. He is the younger brother of Wu-Tang Clan affiliate La the Darkman.

Willie the Kid has guest appeared on DJ Drama's Gangsta Grillz: The Album (2007) and Gangsta Grillz: The Album (Vol. 2) (2009) as well as Lil Wayne's Dedication 2 (2006) and Dedication 3 (2008) mixtapes. He signed with Asylum Records to release his debut studio album, Absolute Greatness (2008), which entered the Top R&B/Hip-Hop Albums chart. He is lauded for his collaborative EP Masterpiece Theatre (2013), with the Alchemist.

Outside of his musical career, Willie The Kid's business portfolio includes co-founding of GRUSA, Motu Viget Spirits Company, and co-owning of Motu Lakeshore Wine Bar, Prohibition Bar and Lounge, Sip Coffee and Cocktails, The Elite District in the historic Harris Building, Botanical Company (Boco) Middleville Cannabis Dispensary and The Gas Station Wayland Cannabis Dispensary along with his business partner Jonathan Jelks. He has invested in The Midwest Tech Project and the app Radi8er, and the non-profit Navigate Foundation. He has also co-executive produced I, Too, Sing America: Langston Hughes Unfurled, a PBS American Masters documentary produced by Datari Turner and directed by Kevin Willmott. He also wrote, co-produced and starred in his own short film The Fly in 2015.

== Discography ==
=== Studio albums ===
- 2008: Absolute Greatness
- 2011: The Fly 2.0
- 2011: The Fly 2.0, Japan
- 2013: Masterpiece Theatre (with The Alchemist)
- 2013: Aquamarine
- 2014: The Living Daylights (with Bronze Nazareth)
- 2015: The Fly 3
- 2017: Deutsche Marks (with V Don)
- 2017: Filthy Money (with S-Class Sonny)
- 2018: Gold Rush 2 (with Klever Skemes)
- 2018: Blue Notes (with V Don)
- 2020: Capital Gains
- 2020: Deutsche Marks 2 (with V Don)
- 2021: Keep Watching The Fly
- 2022: Deutsche Marks 3 (with V Don)
- 2023: Blue Notes 2 (with V Don)
- 2024: Deutsche Marks 4 (with V Don)
- 2025: Midnight (with Real Bad Man)

=== EPs ===
- 2010: Never a Dull Moment (with Lee Bannon)
- 2012: Dilla Forever
- 2013: Somewhere.
- 2013: Naledge & Willie the Kid Are...The BrainFly (with BrainFly)
- 2018: Watch the Fly
- 2018: Gold Rush (with Klever Skemes)
- 2018: Things of That Nature (with Brady James)
- 2018: Midwest Willie (with S0op)
- 2018: Studio 28 (with Troy Caesar)
- 2019: Heather Grey (with V Don)
- 2019: City Lights (with Đus)
- 2021: Catch Me If You Can (with V Don)
- 2025: Catch Me If You Can 2 (with V Don)

=== Mixtapes ===
- 2006: The Day the Game Changed... (Hosted by DJ Drama, DJ Sense & Don Cannon)
- 2006: Divide & Conquer (Hosted by DJ Drama & Big Mike)
- 2009: The Fly (Hosted by DJ Drama)
- 2009: The Outkast (Hosted by DJ Scream)
- 2010: The Cure (Hosted by DJ Woogie)
- 2011: The Crates
- 2011: The Cure 2
