= T.I. discography =

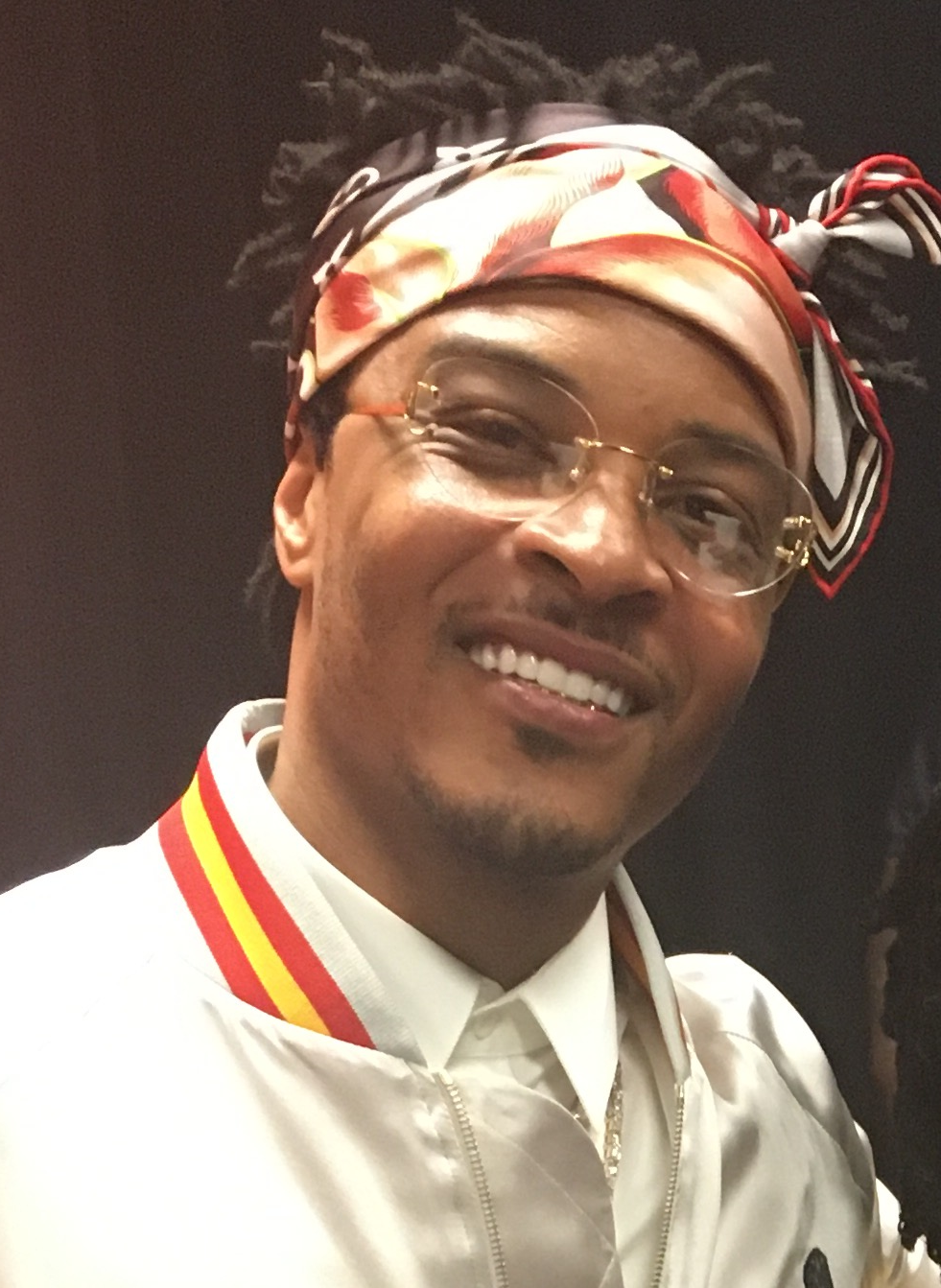
- T.I. in 2021
- Studio albums: 12
- Extended plays: 4
- Compilation albums: 1
- Singles: 110
- Remix albums: 1
- Mixtapes: 13
- Promotional singles: 11

The discography of American rapper T.I. consists of twelve studio albums, one compilation album, one remix album, four extended plays (EPs), 13 mixtapes, 110 singles (including 61 as a featured artist) and 11 promotional singles. He has also released one music video album and over 60 music videos, the details of which are included in his videography.

Throughout his career, T.I.'s music has been released on several record labels, including Artista and Atlantic, as well as his own label imprint, Grand Hustle Records. T.I. has also served as an executive producer for several projects other than his own, including Big Kuntry King's debut My Turn to Eat (2008), B.G.'s Too Hood 2 Be Hollywood (2009), B.o.B's debut The Adventures of Bobby Ray (2010) and Iggy Azalea's debut EP Glory (2012), as well as her debut album The New Classic (2014). In 2005, T.I. had executive produced the soundtrack to the film Hustle & Flow and released the collection through his record label. T.I. is also a noted record producer, having produced several song recordings, a few under the pseudonym T.I.P.. He has also served as a ghostwriter and assisting songwriter for several artists, such as Bow Wow, Sean "Diddy" Combs, Dr. Dre, Bun B and Keyshia Cole.

T.I. was discovered by Kawan "KP" Prather and signed to his label imprint Ghet-O-Vision Entertainment. Upon signing a recording contract with Arista Records subsidiary LaFace Records in 2001, he shortened his name from TIP to T.I., out of respect for his Arista label-mate Q-Tip. In 2001, T.I. released his debut album, I'm Serious. The album peaked at number 98 on the US Billboard 200 chart and sold about 270,000 copies. Due to poor sales, T.I. asked for a joint venture deal with Arista or be released from his contract; he was subsequently granted his release and dropped from the label. In 2002, T.I. was featured on the Greg Street's mixtape of Field Mob's song, "All I Know" featuring Jazze Pha. In 2003, T.I. launched Grand Hustle Entertainment (now Grand Hustle Records) with his longtime business partner Jason Geter and signed a new deal with Atlantic Records. He then collaborated with fellow Atlanta-based rapper Bone Crusher and Killer Mike, for the song "Never Scared". The song became a hit for the summer of 2003, peaking at number 26 in the US, marking T.I.'s first appearance on the US Billboard Hot 100 chart.

T.I. released Trap Muzik, his first album under Grand Hustle/Atlantic, in 2003. It contained the lead single "24's", which had peaked at number 78 on the US Billboard Hot 100 chart, his first solo entry there. Trap Muzik later debuted at number four on the US Billboard 200 chart and was certified platinum by the Recording Industry Association of America (RIAA), making it much more successful than his previous effort. The following singles, "Rubberband Man" and "Let's Get Away", also impacted the Hot 100 chart, while "Be Easy" only charted Billboard's R&B chart. His third album, Urban Legend, was released in 2004 and included the hit single "Bring 'Em Out", which peaked at number nine in the US and was certified platinum. The album peaked at number seven on the Billboard 200 and was also certified platinum in the US. Urban Legend also spawned the singles "U Don't Know Me" and "ASAP". In 2006, his fourth album King, debuted at number one and was certified gold in its first week of release. The lead single, "What You Know" peaked at number three in the US, and was certified double-platinum. King, which also serves as the official soundtrack for T.I.'s first feature film ATL, was certified platinum in the US, gold in Canada, and silver in the UK. King also included "Why You Wanna", "Live in the Sky" and "Top Back". Later that year, he earned his first number-one US single with "My Love", his collaboration with American pop singer Justin Timberlake.

T.I. released his fifth album T.I. vs. T.I.P., in 2007, which went on to become his second consecutive number-one album. The lead single "Big Shit Poppin' (Do It)", peaked at number nine in the US. The album was certified platinum in the US and gold in Canada. The other singles from the album included "You Know What It Is" and "Hurt". In 2008, before T.I.'s prison sentence, he released Paper Trail, his third number-one album in the United States, which was certified gold in its first week of release. The album included two US number-one singles with four top-five singles overall: "Whatever You Like", Swagga Like Us" (featuring Lil Wayne, Kanye West and Jay-Z), "Live Your Life" (featuring Rihanna), and "Dead and Gone" (featuring Justin Timberlake). The album, was certified double-platinum in the US, platinum in Canada, and gold in Australia, New Zealand, and the United Kingdom. In 2009, Paper Trail was re-released entitled Paper Trail: Case Closed, as an EP in the UK and included two new singles and three songs off the original album. In 2010, while serving 11 months in prison for probation violation, he released his seventh studio album No Mercy, in December 2010. No Mercy included the lead single "Get Back Up", which features American singer Chris Brown, and "That's All She Wrote", which features American rapper Eminem. The album debuted at number four in America and was certified gold by the RIAA.

In 2012, T.I. released Trouble Man: Heavy Is the Head, on December 18. The album peaked at number two in the US and was certified gold by the RIAA. The album spawned two successful singles, "Go Get It" and "Ball". Following the album's release, T.I. announced he drew a close to his 10-year contract with Atlantic Records and was searching for a new label to sign himself and Grand Hustle. In November 2013, T.I. revealed he signed a record deal with Columbia Records, to release his ninth album, then-titled Trouble Man II: He Who Wears the Crown. He would later announce he postponed Trouble Man II, after recording with longtime collaborator Pharrell Williams (who was influential in his move to Columbia), and would now release a new project titled Paperwork. The album produced two successful singles, "About the Money" and "No Mediocre".

== Albums ==
=== Studio albums ===
List of studio albums, with selected chart positions, sales figures and certifications
Title	Album details	Peak chart positions										Sales	Certifications
Title	Album details	US	US R&B	US Rap	AUS	CAN	GER	IRE	NZ	SWI	UK	Sales	Certifications
I'm Serious	Released: October 9, 2001; Label: Ghet-O-Vision, Arista; Format: CD, LP, cassette, digital download	98	27	—	—	—	—	—	—	—	—		
Trap Muzik	Released: August 19, 2003; Label: Grand Hustle, Atlantic; Format: CD, LP, cassette, digital download	4	2	—	—	—	—	—	—	—	—		RIAA: Platinum
Urban Legend	Released: November 30, 2004; Label: Grand Hustle, Atlantic; Format: CD, LP, digital download	7	1	1	—	—	—	—	—	—	—	195,000 (first week sales)	RIAA: 2× Platinum
King	Released: March 28, 2006; Label: Grand Hustle, Atlantic; Format: CD, LP, digital download	1	1	1	—	24	86	76	—	99	83	522,000 (first week sales)	RIAA: 2× Platinum; BPI: Silver; MC: Gold
T.I. vs. T.I.P.	Released: July 3, 2007; Label: Grand Hustle, Atlantic; Format: CD, LP, digital download	1	1	1	—	7	96	78	37	59	101		RIAA: Platinum; MC: Gold
Paper Trail	Released: September 30, 2008; Label: Grand Hustle, Atlantic; Format: CD, LP, digital download	1	1	1	16	2	79	34	9	46	42		RIAA: 4× Platinum; ARIA: Gold; BPI: Gold; MC: Platinum; RMNZ: 2× Platinum
No Mercy	Released: December 7, 2010; Label: Grand Hustle, Atlantic; Format: CD, LP, digital download	4	1	1	69	35	—	27	39	—	39	159,000 (first week sales)	RIAA: Platinum; RMNZ: Gold
Trouble Man: Heavy Is the Head	Released: December 18, 2012; Label: Grand Hustle, Atlantic; Format: CD, digital download	2	1	1	—	—	—	—	—	—	188	501,000	RIAA: Gold
Paperwork	Released: October 21, 2014; Label: Grand Hustle, Columbia; Format: CD, LP, digital download	2	1	1	43	19	—	—	—	64	85	157,000	
Dime Trap	Released: October 5, 2018; Label: Grand Hustle, Epic; Format: CD, LP, digital download	13	8	8	—	63	—	—	—	—	—		
The L.I.B.R.A.	Released: October 16, 2020; Label: Grand Hustle, Empire; Format: CD, digital download	18	9	11	—	—	—	—	—	—	—		
Kill the King	Released: June 26, 2026; Label: Grand Hustle, Empire; Format: CD, digital download	30	10	7	—	—	—	—	—	—	—		
"—" denotes a recording that did not chart or was not released in that territory.

=== Compilation albums ===
List of compilation albums, with selected chart positions
Title	Album details	Peak chart positions
Title	Album details	US R&B
Us or Else: Letter to the System	Released: December 16, 2016; Label: Grand Hustle, Roc Nation; Format: Digital download, streaming	39

=== Remix albums ===
List of remix albums, with selected chart positions
Title	Album details	Peak chart positions	
Title	Album details	US R&B	US Rap
Urban Legend: Chopped & Screwed	Released: March 15, 2005; Label: Grand Hustle, Atlantic; Format: CD, digital download	42	20

== Extended plays ==
List of extended plays, with selected chart positions
Title	EP details	Peak chart positions		
Title	EP details	US	US R&B	US Rap
A King of Oneself	Released: September 30, 2008; Label: Grand Hustle, Atlantic; Format: CD, digital download	128	27	14
Da' Nic	Released: September 11, 2015; Label: Grand Hustle, King Inc., Empire; Format: CD, digital download	22	3	2
Us or Else	Released: September 23, 2016; Label: Grand Hustle, Roc Nation; Format: Digital download, streaming	175	12	8

== Mixtapes ==
Title	Mixtape details
In da Streets (with P$C)	Released: 2002; Label: Self-released; Format: CD, digital download
In da Streets Part 2 (with P$C)	Released: 2003; Label: Grand Hustle; Format: CD, digital download
In da Streets Pt. 3 (with P$C)	Released: 2003; Label: Grand Hustle; Format: CD, digital download
Gangsta Grillz Meets T.I. & P$C in da Streets (with P$C)	Released: 2003; Label: Grand Hustle; Format: CD, digital download
Gangsta Grillz: Down with the King	Released: 2004; Label: Grand Hustle; Format: CD, digital download
Gangsta Grillz: The Leak	Released: January 12, 2006; Label: Grand Hustle, The Aphilliates; Format: Digital download
A Year and a Day	Released: May 31, 2009; Label: Grand Hustle, Hood Rich; Format: Digital download
Live From Forest City Correctional Facility	Released: August 5, 2009; Label: A-Town Down; Format: CD, digital download
Gangsta Grillz: Fuck a Mixtape	Released: May 27, 2010; Label: Grand Hustle, Hood Rich, The Aphilliates; Format: Digital download
Fuck da City Up	Released: January 1, 2012; Label: Grand Hustle; Format: Digital download
G.D.O.D. (Get Dough or Die) (with Hustle Gang)	Released: May 7, 2013; Label: Grand Hustle; Format: Digital download
G.D.O.D. II (with Hustle Gang)	Released: September 19, 2014; Label: Grand Hustle; Format: Digital download
We Want Smoke (with Hustle Gang)	Released: October 13, 2017; Label: Grand Hustle; Format: Digital download

== Singles ==
=== As lead artist ===
List of singles as lead artist, with selected chart positions and certifications, showing year released and album name
Title	Year	Peak chart positions										Certifications	Album
Title	Year	US	US R&B	US Rap	AUS	CAN	GER	IRE	NZ	SWI	UK	Certifications	Album
"I'm Serious" (featuring Beenie Man)	2001	—	—^{[A]}	—	—	—	—	—	—	—	—		I'm Serious
"24's"	2003	78	27	15	—	—	—	—	—	—	—	RIAA: Gold	Trap Muzik
"Be Easy"	2003	—	55	—	—	—	—	—	—	—	—		Trap Muzik
"Rubber Band Man"	2004	30	15	11	—	—	—	—	—	—	—		Trap Muzik
"Let's Get Away" (featuring Jazze Pha)	2004	35	17	10	—	—	—	—	—	—	—		Trap Muzik
"Bring 'Em Out"	2004	9	6	4	—	—	—	—	—	—	59	RIAA: 2× Platinum	Urban Legend
"U Don't Know Me"	2005	23	6	4	—	—	—	—	—	—	—	RIAA: Platinum	Urban Legend
"ASAP"	2005	75	18	14	—	—	—	—	—	—	—	RIAA: Gold	Urban Legend
"What You Know"	2006	3	1	1	—	—	—	—	—	—	80	RIAA: 2× Platinum; RMNZ: Gold	King
"Why You Wanna"	2006	29	5	4	49	—	—	17	—	43	22	RIAA: Gold	King
"Live in the Sky" (featuring Jamie Foxx)	2006	—	57	—	—	—	—	—	—	—	83		King
"Top Back"	2006	29	13	8	—	—	—	—	—	—	—	RIAA: Platinum	King
"Big Shit Poppin' (Do It)"	2007	9	7	2	—	75	—	—	8	—	—	RIAA: Platinum; RMNZ: Gold	T.I. vs. T.I.P.
"You Know What It Is" (featuring Wyclef Jean)	2007	34	11	5	—	—	—	—	—	—	—		T.I. vs. T.I.P.
"Hurt" (featuring Alfamega and Busta Rhymes)	2007	—	89	—	—	—	—	—	—	—	—		T.I. vs. T.I.P.
"No Matter What"	2008	72	42	17	—	66	—	—	—	—	—		Paper Trail
"Whatever You Like"	2008	1	1	1	13	12	57	19	1	—	47	RIAA: 8× Platinum; BPI: Gold; RMNZ: 3× Platinum	Paper Trail
"Swing Ya Rag" (featuring Swizz Beatz)	2008	62	53	29	—	—	—	—	—	—	—		Paper Trail
"What Up, What's Haapnin'"	2008	84	97	34	—	—	—	—	—	—	—		Paper Trail
"Swagga Like Us" (with Jay-Z, featuring Kanye West and Lil Wayne)	2008	5	11	4	—	19	—	—	—	—	33	RIAA: Platinum; MC: Gold	Paper Trail
"Ready for Whatever"	2008	57	—	—	—	62	—	—	—	—	—		Paper Trail
"Live Your Life" (featuring Rihanna)	2008	1	2	1	3	4	12	3	2	8	2	RIAA: 8× Platinum; ARIA: Platinum; BPI: 2× Platinum; RMNZ: 4× Platinum	Paper Trail
"Dead and Gone" (featuring Justin Timberlake)	2009	2	2	1	4	3	7	3	2	18	4	RIAA: 5× Platinum; ARIA: Platinum; BPI: Platinum; RMNZ: 2× Platinum	Paper Trail
"Remember Me" (featuring Mary J. Blige)	2009	29	42	—	—	21	—	19	—	—	34	ARIA: Platinum	Paper Trail: Case Closed
"Hell of a Life"	2009	54	71	—	—	43	—	—	—	—	—		Paper Trail: Case Closed
"I'm Back"	2010	44	12	7	—	44	—	—	—	—	—		No Mercy
"Yeah Ya Know (Takers)"	2010	44	65	—	—	68	—	—	—	—	—		No Mercy
"Got Your Back" (featuring Keri Hilson)	2010	38	10	4	—	48	—	33	—	—	45	RIAA: Platinum; RMNZ: Gold	No Mercy
"Ya Hear Me"^{[N]}	2010	118	81	—	—	—	—	—	—	—	—		No Mercy
"Get Back Up" (featuring Chris Brown)	2010	70	37	20	91	—	—	—	—	—	—		No Mercy
"I Can't Help It"^{[O]} (featuring Rocko)	2010	103	—	—	—	—	—	—	—	—	—		No Mercy
"No Mercy"^{[P]} (featuring The-Dream)	2010	123	40	19	—	—	—	—	—	—	—	RIAA: Platinum	No Mercy
"That's All She Wrote"^{[B]} (featuring Eminem)	2011	18	101	—	—	46	—	—	—	—	158	BPI: Silver; RMNZ: Platinum	No Mercy
"We Don't Get Down Like Y'all" (featuring B.o.B)	2011	78	—	—	—	—	—	—	—	—	—		Non-album singles
"I'm Flexin'" (featuring Big K.R.I.T.)	2011	66	32	23	—	—	—	—	—	—	—		Non-album singles
"Here Ye, Hear Ye"^{[Q]} (featuring Sk8brd)	2011	—	119	—	—	—	—	—	—	—	—		Non-album singles
"Love This Life"	2012	81	39	—	—	—	—	—	—	—	—		Trouble Man: Heavy Is the Head
"Like That"^{[R]}	2012	113	105	—	—	—	—	—	—	—	—		Trouble Man: Heavy Is the Head
"Go Get It"	2012	77	40	18	—	86	—	—	—	—	—		Trouble Man: Heavy Is the Head
"Ball" (featuring Lil Wayne)	2012	50	11	10	—	58	—	—	—	—	—	RIAA: Platinum	Trouble Man: Heavy Is the Head
"Trap Back Jumpin"	2012	—	38	10	—	—	—	—	—	—	—		Trouble Man: Heavy Is the Head
"Sorry" (featuring André 3000)	2012	116	36	14	—	—	—	—	—	—	—		Trouble Man: Heavy Is the Head
"Hello" (featuring Cee Lo Green)	2013	—	—	—	—	—	—	—	—	—	—		Trouble Man: Heavy Is the Head
"Memories Back Then" (featuring B.o.B, Kendrick Lamar, and Kris Stephens)	2013	88	30	—	—	—	—	—	—	—	—		Non-album singles
"Wit' Me" (featuring Lil Wayne)	2013	80	27	21	—	—	—	—	—	—	—		Non-album singles
"About the Money" (featuring Young Thug)	2014	42	12	10	—	—	—	—	—	—	—	RIAA: Gold; RMNZ: Gold	Paperwork
"No Mediocre" (featuring Iggy Azalea)	2014	33	8	6	36	59	41	—	34	—	49	RIAA: Platinum; ARIA: Gold; MC: Gold	Paperwork
"Private Show" (featuring Chris Brown)	2015	120	42	—	—	—	—	—	—	—	—		Paperwork
"Project Steps"	2015	—	—	—	—	—	—	—	—	—	—		Da' Nic
"Check, Run It"	2015	—	—	—	—	—	—	—	—	—	—		Da' Nic
"Money Talk"	2016	—	—	—	—	—	—	—	—	—	—		Non-album singles
"Dope" (featuring Marsha Ambrosius)	2016	121	46	—	—	—	—	—	—	—	—		Non-album singles
"We Will Not"	2016	—	—	—	—	—	—	—	—	—	—		Us or Else
"Warzone"	2016	—	—	—	—	—	—	—	—	—	—		Us or Else
"Jefe" (featuring Meek Mill)	2018	121	—	—	—	—	—	—	—	—	—		Dime Trap
"Wraith" (featuring Yo Gotti)	2018	—	—	—	—	—	—	—	—	—	—		Dime Trap
"The Weekend" (with Young Thug)	2018	—	—	—	—	—	—	—	—	—	—		Dime Trap
"Fuck Nigga"	2019	—	—	—	—	—	—	—	—	—	—		Non-album singles
"Sabotage"	2019	—	—	—	—	—	—	—	—	—	—		Non-album singles
"Ring" (featuring Young Thug)	2020	117	—	—	—	—	—	—	—	—	—		The L.I.B.R.A.
"Pardon" (featuring Lil Baby)	2020	97	40	—	—	—	—	—	—	—	—	RIAA: Gold	The L.I.B.R.A.
"Never Fall Off" (with Currensy and Jermaine Dupri)	2023	—	—	—	—	—	—	—	—	—	—		For Motivational Use Only, Vol. 1
"Llogclay" (featuring YoungBoy Never Broke Again)	2024	—	—	—	—	—	—	—	—	—	—		Non-album singles
"Thank God" (with Young Dro and Kirk Franklin featuring Sunday Service Choir)	2024	— (Note: "Thank God" did not enter the Billboard Hot 100 chart, but peaked at number 6 on the Hot Gospel Songs chart and number 1 on the Gospel Airplay chart.)	—	—	—	—	—	—	—	—	—		Non-album singles
"Munda on the Rise" (with Danny Zee and Ali Zafar)	2024	—	—	—	—	—	—	—	—	—	—		Non-album singles
"Havin' My Way" (with PSC)	2025	—	—	—	—	—	—	—	—	—	—		Non-album singles
"Let 'Em Know"	2026	33	8	4	—	—	—	—	— (Note: "Let 'Em Know" did not enter the NZ Top 40 Singles Chart, but peaked at number 24 on the NZ Hot Singles Chart.)	—	—	RIAA: Platinum	Kill the King
"Mr. Him"	2026	—	47	—	—	—	—	—	—	—	—		Kill the King
"—" denotes a recording that did not chart or was not released in that territory.

=== As featured artist ===
List of singles as featured artist, with selected chart positions and certifications, showing year released and album name
Title	Year	Peak chart positions										Certifications	Album
Title	Year	US	US R&B	US Rap	AUS	CAN	GER	IRE	NZ	SWI	UK	Certifications	Album
"Never Scared" (Bone Crusher featuring T.I. and Killer Mike)	2003	26	8	6	—	—	—	—	—	—	—		AttenCHUN!
"Round Here" (Memphis Bleek featuring T.I. and Trick Daddy)	2003	—	53	—	—	—	—	—	—	—	—		M.A.D.E.
"Soldier" (Destiny's Child featuring T.I. and Lil Wayne)	2004	3	3	—	3	—	11	6	4	10	4	RIAA: Platinum; ARIA: Gold; RMNZ: Platinum; BPI: Gold	Destiny Fulfilled
"The One" (Cee Lo Green featuring Jazze Pha and T.I.)	2004	—	82	—	—	—	—	—	—	—	—		Cee-Lo Green... Is the Soul Machine
"3 Kings" (Slim Thug featuring T.I. and Bun B)	2005	—	78	—	—	—	—	—	—	—	—		Already Platinum
"Shoulder Lean" (Young Dro featuring T.I)	2006	10	1	1	—	—	—	—	—	—	—	RIAA: 2× Platinum	Best Thang Smokin'
"Tell 'Em What They Wanna Hear" (Rashad featuring T.I. and Young Dro)	2006	—	76	—	—	—	—	—	—	—	—		Grand Hustle Presents: In da Streetz Volume 4
"My Love" (Justin Timberlake featuring T.I.)	2006	1	2	—	3	—	4	4	1	2	2	RIAA: Platinum; ARIA: 2× Platinum; BPI: Platinum; RMNZ: 2× Platinum; MC: 2× Platinum	FutureSex/LoveSounds
"Pac's Life"^{[D]} (2Pac featuring T.I. and Ashanti)	2006	119	81	—	34	—	31	9	38	—	21	RMNZ: Gold	Pac's Life
"I'm a Flirt" (R. Kelly featuring T.I. and T-Pain)	2007	12	2	1	59	—	—	—	—	—	18	RIAA: Platinum	Double Up
"We Takin' Over" (DJ Khaled featuring Akon, T.I., Rick Ross, Fat Joe, Birdman and Lil Wayne)	2007	28	26	11	—	92	—	—	—	—	—	RIAA: Platinum; MC: Gold	We the Best
"Whatever U Like"^{[E]} (Nicole Scherzinger featuring T.I.)	2007	104	113	—	—	57	—	—	—	—	—		non-album single
"That's Right"^{[F]} (Big Kuntry King featuring T.I.)	2007	—	105	—	—	—	—	—	—	—	—		My Turn to Eat
"5000 Ones" (DJ Drama featuring Nelly, T.I., Yung Joc, Willie the Kid, Young Jeezy, Diddy and Twista)	2007	—	73	—	—	—	—	—	—	—	—		Gangsta Grillz: The Album
"For a Minute" (B.G. featuring T.I.)	2007	—	—	—	—	—	—	—	—	—	—		Too Hood 2 Be Hollywood
"Uh Huh" (Alfamega featuring T.I.)	2008	—	60	—	—	—	—	—	—	—	—		non-album single
"I'll Be Lovin' U Long Time" (Remix) (Mariah Carey featuring T.I.)	2008	58	36	—	—	69	—	—	—	—	84		E=MC²
"Wish You Would"^{[M]} (Ludacris featuring T.I.)	2008	114	118	—	—	—	—	—	—	—	—		Theater of the Mind
"Just Like Me" (Jamie Foxx featuring T.I.)	2008	49	8	—	91	—	—	—	12	—	—		Intuition
"Ain't I" (Yung L.A. featuring T.I. and Young Dro)	2008	47	7	4	—	—	—	—	—	—	—		non-album single
"Day Dreaming" (DJ Drama featuring Akon, T.I. and Snoop Dogg)	2009	—	88	—	—	—	—	—	33	—	—		Gangsta Grillz: The Album (Vol. 2)
"Hello Good Morning" (Diddy – Dirty Money featuring T.I.)	2010	27	13	8	94	55	—	41	—	65	22	RIAA: Gold	Last Train to Paris
"Winner" (Jamie Foxx featuring T.I. and Justin Timberlake)	2010	28	65	—	—	23	—	—	37	—	—		Best Night of My Life
"Bet I" (B.o.B featuring T.I. and Playboy Tre)	2010	72	60	—	—	—	—	—	—	—	—		B.o.B Presents: The Adventures of Bobby Ray
"Make Up Bag"^{[G]} (The-Dream featuring T.I.)	2010	103	33	—	—	—	—	—	—	—	—		Love King
"Fancy" (Drake featuring T.I. and Swizz Beatz)	2010	25	4	1	—	54	—	—	—	—	—	RIAA: Platinum; RMNZ: Gold	Thank Me Later
"Ready Set Go"^{[H]} (Killer Mike featuring T.I.)	2010	—	110	—	—	—	—	—	—	—	—		PL3DGE
"9 Piece" (Rick Ross featuring T.I.)	2011	61	32	18	—	—	—	—	—	—	—		Ashes to Ashes
"F.A.M.E."^{[I]} (Young Jeezy featuring T.I.)	2011	119	67	—	—	—	—	—	—	—	—		Thug Motivation 103: Hustlerz Ambition
"Magic" (Future featuring T.I.)	2012	69	10	13	—	—	—	—	—	—	—	RIAA: Gold	Pluto
"We in This Bitch" (DJ Drama featuring Young Jeezy, T.I., Ludacris and Future)	2012	—	68	—	—	—	—	—	—	—	—		Quality Street Music
"Big Beast" (Killer Mike featuring Bun B, Trouble and T.I.)	2012	—	—	—	—	—	—	—	—	—	—		R.A.P. Music
"Back 2 Life (Live It Up)"^{[J]} (Sean Kingston featuring T.I.)	2012	109	108	—	—	52	—	—	—	—	—		Back 2 Life
"2 Reasons" (Trey Songz featuring T.I.)	2012	43	8	25	—	—	—	—	—	—	—	RIAA: Platinum	Chapter V
"Compliments" (Tank featuring T.I. and Kris Stephens)	2012	—	75	—	—	—	—	—	—	—	—		This Is How I Feel
"Our Year" (Bryyce featuring T.I.)	2012	—	—	—	—	—	—	—	—	—	—		Hard Work Pays
"We Still in This Bitch" (B.o.B featuring T.I. and Juicy J)	2013	64	19	15	—	72	—	—	—	—	—	RIAA: Platinum	Underground Luxury
"Blurred Lines" (Robin Thicke featuring T.I. and Pharrell)	2013	1	1	—	1	1	1	1	1	1	1	RIAA: Diamond (10× Platinum); ARIA: 9× Platinum; BPI: 4× Platinum; BVMI: 4× Platinum; IFPI SWI: 3×Platinum; MC: 9× Platinum; RMNZ: 5× Platinum	Blurred Lines
"Upper Echelon" (Travi$ Scott featuring T.I. and 2 Chainz)	2013	—	—	—	—	—	—	—	—	—	—	RIAA: Gold	Owl Pharaoh
"50K" (Remix) (Waka Flocka Flame featuring T.I.)	2013	—	—	—	—	—	—	—	—	—	—		DuFlocka Rant: Halftime Show
"Let Me Find Out" (Remix) (Doe B featuring T.I. and Juicy J)	2013	—	—	—	—	—	—	—	—	—	—		G.D.O.D. (Get Dough or Die)
"Ball Out" (Shad da God featuring T.I.)	2013	—	—	—	—	—	—	—	—	—	—		Gas Life
"Kickin' Flav" (Big Kuntry King featuring T.I.)	2013	—	—	—	—	—	—	—	—	—	—		Dope & Champagne
"I Wish" (Cher Lloyd featuring T.I.)	2013	—	—	—	40	—	—	—	19	—	160		Sorry I'm Late
"Here I Go" (Spodee featuring T.I., Mystikal, Young Dro and Shad da God)	2013	—	—	—	—	—	—	—	—	—	—		No Pressure 2
"Change Your Life" (Iggy Azalea featuring T.I.)	2013	122	34	23	44	—	—	28	38	—	10	RIAA: Gold; ARIA: Gold	The New Classic
"I Can't Describe (The Way I Feel)" (Jennifer Hudson featuring T.I.)	2013	—	—	—	—	—	—	—	—	—	—		JHUD
"King Shit" (Yo Gotti featuring T.I.)	2013	—	—	—	—	—	—	—	—	—	—		I Am
"Away" (Spodee featuring T.I. and Trae tha Truth)	2013	—	—	—	—	—	—	—	—	—	—		No Pressure 2
"Episode" (E-40 featuring T.I. and Chris Brown)	2013	—	—	—	—	—	—	—	—	—	—		The Block Brochure: Welcome to the Soil 4
"Rick James" (Nelly featuring T.I.)	2013	—	—	—	—	—	—	—	—	—	—		M.O.
"Why" (Doe B featuring T.I.)	2014	—	—	—	—	—	—	—	—	—	—		DOAT 3 (Definition of a Trapper)
"Coke Bottle" (Agnez Mo featuring Timbaland and T.I.)	2014	—	—	—	—	—	—	—	—	—	—		non-album single
"Homicide" (Doe B featuring T.I.)	2014	—	—	—	—	—	—	—	—	—	—		DOAT 3 (Definition of a Trapper)
"Gumbo" (Stak5 featuring Rocko, T.I. and Jeezy)	2014	—	—	—	—	—	—	—	—	—	—		Album B4 the Album
"Chosen" (Hustle Gang featuring T.I., B.o.B and Spodee)	2014	—	56	—	—	—	—	—	—	—	—		non-album single
"Look What I Did" (Skeme featuring T.I.)	2014	—	—	—	—	—	—	—	—	—	—		Play Dirty, Stay Dirty
"UV Love" (Clinton Sparks featuring T.I.)	2014	—	—	—	—	—	—	—	—	—	—		ICONoclast
"This Girl" (Stafford Brothers featuring Eva Simons and T.I.)	2014	—	—	—	58	—	—	—	—	—	—		This Girl EP
"Ejeajo" (P-Square featuring T.I.)	2014	—	—	—	—	—	—	—	—	—	—		Double Trouble
"Waves" (Robin Schulz Remix) (Mr Probz featuring Chris Brown and T.I.)	2014	—	—	—	—	—	—	—	—	—	—		non-album single
"Flexin'" (DJ Holiday featuring Meek Mill, Future, T.I. and Stuey Rock)	2014	—	—	—	—	—	—	—	—	—	—		God Bless the Mixtape
"That's My Shit" (The-Dream featuring T.I.)	2015	—	42	—	—	—	—	—	—	—	—		Crown
"It's Not My Fault" (Anthony Lewis featuring T.I.)	2015	—	—	—	—	—	—	—	—	—	—		Five Senses
"Don't Make Me Wait" (LeToya Luckett featuring T.I.)	2015	—	—	—	—	—	—	—	—	—	—		Until Then
"Boy" (Lil Bibby featuring T.I.)	2015	—	—	—	—	—	—	—	—	—	—		Free Crack 2
"How" (5ive Mics featuring T.I.)	2015	—	—	—	—	—	—	—	—	—	—		New York's My Home
"How to Live Alone" (Evan Ross featuring T.I.)	2015	—	—	—	—	—	—	—	—	—	—		non-album singles
"Get Low" (50 Cent featuring Jeremih, 2 Chainz and T.I.)	2015	—	52	—	—	—	—	—	—	—	—		non-album singles
"California" (Colonel Loud featuring T.I., Young Dolph and Ricco Barrino)	2015	102	32	21	—	—	—	—	—	—	—		non-album singles
"Bankrolls on Deck" (Bankroll Mafia featuring T.I., Young Thug, Shad da God and PeeWee Roscoe)	2015	—	—	—	—	—	—	—	—	—	—		Bankroll Mafia
"Young & Stupid" (T. Mills featuring T.I.)	2015	—	—	—	—	—	—	—	—	—	—		non-album single
"Making Luv to the Beat" (Watch The Duck featuring T.I. and DJ E-Feezy)	2015	—	—	—	—	—	—	—	—	—	—		The Trojan Horse
"Why You Mad? (Infinity Remix)" (Mariah Carey featuring French Montana, Justin Bieber and T.I.)	2015	—	—	—	—	—	—	—	—	—	—		non-album single
"Out My Face" (Bankroll Mafia featuring T.I., Young Thug, Shad da God and London Jae)	2016	—	—	—	—	—	—	—	—	—	—		Bankroll Mafia
"All Good" (Trae tha Truth featuring T.I., Rick Ross and Audio Push)	2016	—	—	—	—	—	—	—	—	—	—		Tha Truth, Pt. 2
"Come Down" (Anderson .Paak featuring T.I.)	2016	—	—	—	—	—	—	—	—	—	—	RIAA: Gold	non-album singles
"I Just Wanna" (Bankroll Fresh featuring T.I. and Spodee)	2016	—	—	—	—	—	—	—	—	—	—		non-album singles
"Baller Alert" (Kevin "Chocolate Droppa" Hart featuring T.I. and Migos)	2016	—	—	—	—	—	—	—	—	—	—		Kevin Hart: What Now? (The Mixtape Presents Chocolate Droppa)
"Signs" (Cherub featuring T.I.)	2016	—	—	—	—	—	—	—	—	—	—		Bleed Gold, Piss Excellence
"4 Lit" (B.o.B featuring T.I. and Ty Dolla $ign)	2016	—	—	—	—	—	—	—	—	—	—		Ether
"I'm Blessed" (Charlie Wilson featuring T.I.)	2016	—	—	—	—	—	—	—	—	—	—		In It to Win It
"Nobody" (Rotimi featuring 50 Cent and T.I.)	2017	—	—	—	—	—	—	—	—	—	—		Jeep Music, Vol. 1
"I'm on 3.0" (Trae tha Truth featuring T.I., Dave East, Tee Grizzley, Royce da 5'9", Curren$y, DRAM, Snoop Dogg, Fabolous, Rick Ross, Chamillionaire, G-Eazy, Styles P, E-40, Mark Morrison and Gary Clark Jr.)	2017	—	—	—	—	—	—	—	—	—	—		Tha Truth, Pt. 3
"Game 7" (Hustle Gang featuring T.I., Ra Ra and Rossi)	2017	—	—	—	—	—	—	—	—	—	—		We Want Smoke
"Do No Wrong" (Hustle Gang featuring GFMBRYYCE, T.I. and Young Dro)	2017	—	—	—	—	—	—	—	—	—	—		We Want Smoke
"Friends" (Hustle Gang featuring T.I., RaRa, Brandon Rossi, Tokyo Jetz, Trae tha Truth and Young Dro)	2017	—	—	—	—	—	—	—	—	—	—		We Want Smoke
"Ye vs. the People" (Kanye West featuring T.I.)	2018	85	—	—	—	—	—	—	— (Note: "Ye vs. the People" did not enter the NZ Top 40 Singles Chart, but peaked at number three on the NZ Heatseeker Singles Chart.)	—	—		non-album single
"Down" (Outta Space featuring T.I. and T-Pain)	2019	—	—	—	—	—	—	—	—	—	—		NASA 2
"Black Savage" (Royce da 5'9" featuring T.I., Sy Ari da Kid, White Gold, and Cyhi the Prynce)	2019	—	—	—	—	—	—	—	—	—	—		The Allegory
"Time for Change (Black Lives Matter)" (Trae tha Truth featuring T.I., Styles P, Mysonne, Ink, Anthony Hamilton, Conway the Machine, Krayzie Bone, E-40, David Banner, Bun B, Tamika Mallory and Lee Merritt)	2020	—	—	—	—	—	—	—	—	—	—		non-album singles
"Don't Worry Be Happy" (Lil Duval featuring T.I.)	2020	—	—	—	—	—	—	—	—	—	—		non-album singles
"They Don't" (Nasty C featuring T.I.)	2020												Zulu Man with Some Power
"I Stand on That" (E40 featuring T.I. & Joyner Lucas)	2020												Non-album single
"—" denotes a recording that did not chart or was not released in that territory.

=== Promotional singles ===
List of promotional singles, with selected chart positions, showing year released and album name
Title	Year	Peak chart positions			Album
Title	Year	US	US Christ	CAN	Album
"Ride wit Me"^{[K]}	2006	—	—	—	King
"Front Back"^{[L]} (featuring UGK)	2006	—	—	—	King
"Make It Rain" (Remix) (Fat Joe featuring Lil Wayne, R. Kelly, T.I., Birdman, Rick Ross and Ace Mac)	2007	—	—	—	non-album singles
"Bring It Back" (Remix) (8Ball & MJG featuring T.I.)	2010	—	—	—	non-album singles
"Sleazy Remix 2.0: Get Sleazier" (Kesha featuring Lil Wayne, Wiz Khalifa, T.I. and André 3000)	2011	37	—	74	non-album singles
"Spend It" (Remix) (2 Chainz featuring T.I.)	2011	—	—	—	T.R.U. REALigion
"Ima Boss" (Remix) (Meek Mill featuring T.I., Rick Ross, Lil Wayne, DJ Khaled, Birdman and Swizz Beatz)	2012	51	—	—	non-album singles
"Pour It Up" (Remix) (Rihanna featuring Young Jeezy, Rick Ross, Juicy J and T.I.)	2013	—	—	—	non-album singles
"Bugatti" (Remix) (Ace Hood featuring Birdman, French Montana, Wiz Khalifa, Meek Mill, Future, DJ Khaled, 2 Chainz and T.I.)	2013	—	—	—	Trials & Tribulations
"FDB" (Remix) (Young Dro featuring DJ Drama, Trinidad James, French Montana and T.I.)	2013	—	—	—	non-album singles
"They Don't Know" (Remix) (Rico Love featuring Ludacris, Trey Songz, Tiara Thomas, T.I. and Emjay)	2014	—	—	—	non-album singles
"Your Style" (Remix) (Troy Ave featuring Puff Daddy, T.I. and Ma$e)	2014	—	—	—	BSB Vol. 5 and Major Without a Deal
"New National Anthem" (featuring Skylar Grey)	2014	—	—	—	Paperwork
"Try Me" (Remix) (Dej Loaf featuring T.I. and Jeezy)	2015	—	—	—	non-album singles
"I Bet" (Remix) (Ciara featuring T.I.)	2015	—	—	—	non-album singles
"We in da City" (Remix) (Young Dro featuring T.I.)	2015	—	—	—	non-album singles
"La Policia" (Remix) (Kap G featuring David Banner and T.I.)	2015	—	—	—	Real Migo Shit 3
"Real Nigga" (Remix) (Troy Ave featuring Young Dolph, T.I. and Young Lito)	2015	—	—	—	Major Without A Deal (Reloaded)
"Headphones" (Lecrae featuring Killer Mike and T.I.)	2025	—	31	—	Reconstruction
"—" denotes a recording that did not chart or was not released in that territory.

== Other charted songs ==
List of singles, with selected chart positions and certifications, showing year released and album name
Title	Year	Peak chart positions					Certifications	Album
Title	Year	US	US R&B	AUS	CAN	SWE	Certifications	Album
"Stomp"^{[S]} (Young Buck featuring T.I. and Ludacris)	2004	—	110	—	—	—		Straight Outta Cashville
"Motivation"	2005	—	62	—	—	—		Urban Legend
"Get Loose" (featuring Nelly)	2005	—	70	—	—	—		Urban Legend
"Where They At"	2007	—	69	—	—	—		Grand Hustle Presents: In da Streetz Volume 4
"Touchdown"^{[T]} (featuring Eminem)	2007	109	—	—	—	—		T.I. vs. T.I.P.
"56 Bars (Intro)"^{[U]}	2008	119	—	—	—	—		Paper Trail
"My Life Your Entertainment"^{[V]} (featuring Usher)	2008	119	—	—	—	—		Paper Trail
"I'm Illy"^{[W]}	2008	—	112	—	—	—		Paper Trail
"In My Bag"^{[X]} (Usher featuring T.I.)	2009	—	107	—	—	—		non-album single
"Good Love" (Mary J. Blige featuring T.I.)	2010	—	56	—	—	—		Stronger with Each Tear
"Freeze Me"^{[Y]} (Young Dro featuring Gucci Mane and T.I.)	2010	—	114	—	—	—		Dro Street
"Welcome to the World"^{[Z]} (featuring Kanye West and Kid Cudi)	2010	117	—	—	—	—		No Mercy
"Castle Walls"^{[AA]} (featuring Christina Aguilera)	2010	105	84	—	99	51		No Mercy
"Poppin Bottles"^{[C]} (featuring Drake)	2010	115	75	—	—	—		No Mercy
"Popped Off" (featuring Dr. Dre)	2012	—	75	—	—	—		Fuck da City Up
"This Time of Night" (featuring Nelly)	2012	—	68	—	—	—		Fuck da City Up
"Pyro"^{[AB]}	2012	—	113	—	—	—		non-album single
"Fireworkz" (Remix)^{[AC]} (Tyrese featuring T.I., Big Sean, and Busta Rhymes)	2012	—	103	—	—	—		Open Invitation
"Arena"^{[AD]} (B.o.B featuring Chris Brown and T.I.)	2012	116	—	36	—	—	ARIA: Gold	Strange Clouds
"Plain Jane"^{[AE]} (Gucci Mane featuring Rocko and T.I.)	2012	—	110	—	—	—		I'm Up
"Bitches & Bottles (Let's Get It Started)"^{[BE]} (DJ Khaled featuring Lil Wayne, T.I. and Future)	2012	109	124	—	—	—		Kiss the Ring
"G Season" (featuring Meek Mill)	2012	122	41	—	—	—		Trouble Man: Heavy Is the Head
"Wildside" (featuring ASAP Rocky)	2012	—	105	—	—	—		Trouble Man: Heavy Is the Head
"Guns and Roses" (featuring P!nk)	2013	—	108	15	—	—	ARIA: Platinum	Trouble Man: Heavy Is the Head
"—" denotes a recording that did not chart or was not released in that territory.

== Guest appearances ==
List of non-single guest appearances, with other performing artists, showing year released and album name
Title	Year	Other artist(s)	Album
"2 Glock 9's"	2000	Beanie Sigel	Music from and Inspired by Shaft
"Fiasco"	2001	Toya	Toya
"Changed Man"	2002	2Pac, Jazze Pha, Johnta Austin	Better Dayz
"Keeps Spinnin"	2002	Birdman, Mannie Fresh, Stone, TQ, Wolf, Gillie da Kid, Mikkey, Petey Pablo	Birdman
"We Represent"	2002	8Ball, Lil' Flip	Slab Muzik
"Get Your Weight Up"	2003	Lil Jon, 8Ball	Part II
"It's Going Down 2Nite"	2003	112	Hot & Wet
"Now What"	2003	Juelz Santana	From Me to U
"Re-Akshon Remix"	2003	Killer Mike, Lil Jon, BoneCrusherz, Bun B	Monster
"Pretty Pink"	2003	David Banner, Jazze Pha, Mr. Marcus	MTA2: Baptized in Dirty Water
"End of the Road"	2004	Jim Jones, Bun B	On My Way to Church
"Street Nigga"	2004	B.G.	Life After Cash Money
"Fucking Around"	2004	Trick Daddy, Young Jeezy, Kase-1	Thug Matrimony: Married to the Streets
"Goodies" (Remix)	2004	Ciara, Jazze Pha	Goodies
"Grand Finale"	2004	Lil Jon, Bun B, Jadakiss, Nas, Ice Cube	Crunk Juice
"Let Me Love You" (Remix)	2004	Mario, Jadakiss	Turning Point
"Like a 24"	2004	Twista, Liffy Stokes	Kamikaze
"Roll Call"	2004	Juelz Santana	Back Like Cooked Crack, Pt. 1
"Look at the Grillz"	2004	8Ball & MJG, Twista	Living Legends
"Pimp Squad"	2004	The Alchemist, P$C	1st Infantry
"Pretty Toes"	2004	Nelly, Jazze Pha	Suit
"Stomp"	2004	Young Buck, Ludacris	Straight Outta Cashville
"Where You Wanna Be"	2004	Brandy	Afrodisiac
"Nolia Clap" (Remix)	2004	UTP, Z-Ro, Bun B, Slim Thug	Nolia Clap
"Still Down"	2004	Ashanti	Concrete Rose
"Bang"	2005	Young Jeezy, Lil Scrappy	Let's Get It: Thug Motivation 101
"Bounce Like This"	2005	none	The Longest Yard: The Soundtrack
"Breakin' Old Habits"	2005	The Notorious B.I.G., Slim Thug	Duets: The Final Chapter
"Get Yours"	2005	Lil' Kim, Sha-Dash	The Naked Truth
"I'm a G"	2005	Bun B	Trill
"If I Hit"	2005	112	Pleasure & Pain
"Indiscretions in the Back of the Limo"	2005	DJ Quik	Trauma
"So Many Diamonds"	2005	Paul Wall	The Peoples Champ
"I'm a King"	2005	The Game	You Know What It Is, Vol. 3
"Dip, Slide, Rideout"	2006	DJ Khaled, Big Kuntry King, Young Dro	Listennn... the Album
"What It Is"	2006	Young Dro	Day One
"Trap or Kill Ya Self"	2006	Young Dro, Pharrell	Day One
"Shell"	2006	Young Dro	Day One
"Keep Talking"	2006	Lil' 3rd	King of Cloverland
"I Got Money"	2006	Young Jeezy	The Inspiration
"My Girl"	2006	Young Dro	Best Thang Smokin'
"You Got the Power"	2006	Governor	Son of Pain
"One Blood" (Remix)	2006	The Game, Jim Jones, Snoop Dogg, Nas, Jadakiss, Fat Joe, Lil Wayne, N.O.R.E., Styles P, Fabolous, Juelz Santana, Rick Ross, Twista, Kurupt, Daz Dillinger, WC, E-40, Bun B, Chamillionaire, Slim Thug, Young Dro, Clipse, Ja Rule, Junior Reid	Doctor's Advocate
"We Fly High" (Remix)	2006	Jim Jones, Diddy, Birdman, Young Dro, Jermaine Dupri	A Dipset X-Mas
"Show U Wut to Do Wit It"	2007	Ya Boy	Chapter 1: The Rise
"4 Kings"	2007	Young Buck, Pimp C, Jazze Pha	Buck the World
"Cannon" (Remix)	2007	DJ Drama, Lil Wayne, Willie the Kid, Freeway	Gangsta Grillz: The Album
"No More"	2007	DJ Drama, Lloyd, Willie the Kid	Gangsta Grillz: The Album
"Feds Takin' Pictures"	2007	DJ Drama, Young Jeezy, Willie the Kid, Jim Jones, Rick Ross, Young Buck	Gangsta Grillz: The Album
"King and Queen"	2007	Ciara	—N/a
"Goodbye, My Dear"	2007	Ciara	—N/a
"Hit the Block"	2007	UGK	Underground Kingz
"Let It Go" (Remix)	2007	Keyshia Cole, Missy Elliott, Young Dro	Just like You
"Slow Down"	2007	Wyclef Jean	Carnival Vol. II: Memoirs of an Immigrant
"What Ya Gonna Do"	2008	Maino	Tuck Ya Chain In
"Superstar" (Remix)	2008	Lupe Fiasco, Young Jeezy	Lupe Fiasco's The Cool
"Been Doin' This"	2008	Bow Wow	New Jack City II
"Brand New"	2008	Lyfe Jennings	Lyfe Change
"I'm Dat Nigga"	2008	B.o.B	Who the F#*k Is B.o.B?
"Hold Up"	2008	Nelly, LL Cool J	Brass Knuckles
"It Ain't Me"	2008	T-Pain, Akon	Thr33 Ringz
"Need U Bad" (Remix)	2008	Jazmine Sullivan, Missy Elliott	Fearless
"Love in This Club" (Remix)	2008	Usher, Young Jeezy	Here I Stand
"Hi Hater" (Remix)	2008	Maino, Swizz Beatz, Plies, Jadakiss, Fabolous	Maino Is the Future
"Sip It"	2008	Ernie Gaines	—N/a
"We Stay Fly"	2008	Dolla	—N/a
"If I"	2008	Justin Timberlake	—N/a
"A-Town"	2009	DJ Drama, Young Dro, Sean P, Lonnie Mac	Gangsta Grillz: The Album (Vol. 2)
"Don't Believe 'Em"	2009	Busta Rhymes, Akon	Back on My B.S.
"For Real"	2009	Mullage	Elevators: The Pre-Album
"Good Love"	2009	Mary J. Blige	Stronger with Each Tear
"Niggas Down South" (Remix)	2009	Killer Mike, Bun B	Underground Atlanta
"Magic" (Remix)	2009	Robin Thicke	—N/a
"King on Set"	2009	Young Dro	Music Inspired by More than a Game
"Boo"	2009	8Ball & MJG	—N/a
"Dat's What I Thought"	2010	Mac Boney, Killer Mike	Real Talk Radio Volume 12
" Deuces" (Remix)	2010	Chris Brown, Drake, Kanye West, Fabolous, Rick Ross, Andre 3000	—N/a
"F.I.L.A. (Fall in Love Again)"	2010	The-Dream	—N/a
"Big Money"	2010	Mac Boney	Real Talk Radio Volume 13
"Care"	2010	Kid Rock, Martina McBride	Born Free
"Rosé Red"	2010	Meek Mill, Rick Ross, Vado	Mr. Philadelphia
"Pushin' It"	2010	Game, Robin Thicke	Brake Lights
"Guilty"	2010	Usher	Raymond v. Raymond
"Maybach Music III"	2010	Rick Ross, Jadakiss, Erykah Badu	Teflon Don
"Party People"	2010	N.E.R.D.	Nothing
"Put Your Money on Me"	2010	Ronald Isley	Mr. I
"What They Do"	2010	8Ball & MJG, Masspike Miles	Ten Toes Down
"I Like It" (Remix)	2010	Enrique Iglesias	—N/a
"Anyway"	2010	EDIDON, Kastro of Outlawz	The Stash Spot
"Sanford & Son"	2010	Quincy Jones, B.o.B., Prince Charlez, Mohombi	Q Soul Bossa Nostra
"Feet Don't Fail Me Now"	2010	B.o.B, Spodee	No Genre
"Not Lost"	2010	B.o.B	No Genre
"I Like Dat"	2010	Trey Songz, Swizz Beatz	Passion, Pain & Pleasure
"She's So Fly"	2010	Nelly	5.0
"Tangerine"	2010	Big Boi, Khujo	Sir Luscious Left Foot: The Son of Chico Dusty
"Get Yo Girl"	2011	Rich Kid Shawty	Splurge on Em
"Pinky Ring"	2011	AK the Razorman	Royal Heir
"Boom Bap"	2011	B.o.B, Mos Def	E.P.I.C. (Every Play Is Crucial)
"Country Ass Nigga"	2011	Nelly, 2 Chainz	O.E.MO
"Wanna Win"	2011	Rich Kid Shawty	Shad Marley
"UP!" (Remix)	2012	LoveRance, Young Jeezy	—N/a
"Strange Clouds" (Remix)	2012	B.o.B, Young Jeezy	—N/a
"Rack City" (Remix)	2012	Tyga, Wale, Meek Mill, Young Jeezy, Fabolous	—N/a
"Cream"	2012	Maino, Meek Mill	The Day After Tomorrow
"Block Blazer"	2012	D.O.P.E.	D.O.P.E.
"Harry Potter"	2012	D.O.P.E.	D.O.P.E.
"M.O.B."	2012	Big Kuntry King	100%
"Arena"	2012	B.o.B, Chris Brown	Strange Clouds
"Plain Jane"	2012	Gucci Mane, Rocko	I'm Up
"Bury Me a G"	2012	Rick Ross	Self Made Vol. 2
"What's Happening"	2012	Prodigy	H.N.I.C. 3
"Fightin Words"	2012	Mike Will Made It, Juicy J, Trae tha Truth	Est. in 1989 Pt. 2
"Murda Bizness"	2012	Iggy Azalea	Glory
"Pull Up"	2012	Freddie Gibbs, Young Jeezy	—N/a
"Bitches & Bottles (Let's Get It Started)"	2012	DJ Khaled, Lil Wayne, Future	Kiss the Ring
"I Do This"	2012	Trae tha Truth, Rico Love, DJ Khaled	Tha Blackprint
"Don't Like"	2012	Trae tha Truth	Tha Blackprint
"On 4 Life"	2012	Yung Booke	Fly Therapy
"Forever"	2012	Keyshia Cole	Woman to Woman
"In the A"	2012	Big Boi, Ludacris	Vicious Lies and Dangerous Rumors
"Hustle Gang"	2012	Chip, Iggy Azalea	London Boy
"On the Scene"	2012	Chip, Young Jeezy	London Boy
"R.N.F."	2012	Chip, Jeremih	London Boy
"All Gold Everything" (Remix)	2013	Trinidad James, Young Jeezy, 2 Chainz	Don't Be S.A.F.E.
"Do It Then"	2013	TM88, Trae tha Truth, Hardo	Crazy 8: It's A Southside Track 3
"No Regrets"	2013	Snoop Lion	—N/a
"Show Out" (Remix)	2013	Juicy J, Pimp C	—N/a
"I Wish It Was Music"	2013	Wyclef Jean, Trae tha Truth	April Showers
"Roll Up"	2013	Problem, Snoop Dogg	The Separation
"Nope"	2013	Young Dro	Day Two
"Bars"	2013	Young Dro, Mac Boney, Spodee	Day Two
"Don't Want It"	2013	Doe B	Baby Jesus
"Have It Your Way"	2013	Birdman, Lil Wayne	Rich Gang
"Freeze Up"	2013	Shad da God, Young Dro	Gas Life
"Ball Out"	2013	Shad da God, Young Dro, Chip	Gas Life
"I'ma Ride"	2013	Shad da God	Gas Life
"Pinstripes"	2013	Goodie Mob	Age Against the Machine
"Commas" (Remix)	2013	L.E.P. Bogus Boys, Young Jeezy, Mase, Spenzo	Don't Feed Da Killaz Vol. 4
"#TwerkIt" (Remix)	2013	Busta Rhymes, Vybz Kartel, Ne-Yo, French Montana, Jeremih	—N/a
"Crickets" (Remix)	2013	Drop City Yacht Club, Jeremih	—N/a
"Ain't No Coming Down" (Remix)	2013	Juicy J	—N/a
"Typa Way"	2013	Lil Wayne	Dedication 5
"FuckWitMeUKnowIGotIt"	2013	Lil Wayne	Dedication 5
"Feds Watchin"	2013	Lil Wayne, 2 Chainz	Dedication 5
"Theme Song"	2013	Audio Push	Come As You Are
"IDGAF"	2013	Nelly, Pharrell	M.O.
"Get Lucky" (Remix)	2013	Daft Punk, Pharrell, Nile Rodgers	—N/a
"Jungle"	2013	Cam'ron, Yo Gotti	Ghetto Heaven Vol. 1
"Bad Bitch"	2013	Young Dro, Spodee, Problem	High Times
"Nope"	2013	Young Dro	High Times
"Jewels n' Drugs"	2013	Lady Gaga, Too Short, Twista	Artpop
"I Feel Like Pac/I Feel Like Biggie"	2013	DJ Khaled, Diddy, Rick Ross, Meek Mill, Swizz Beatz	Suffering from Success
"Hold Up"	2013	Trae tha Truth, Diddy, Young Jeezy	I Am King
"Ride wit Me"	2013	Trae tha Truth, Meek Mill	I Am King
"Fly Shit"	2013	Yung Booke	City on My Back
"Tik Tik Boom"	2013	Britney Spears	Britney Jean
"Shit" (Megamix)	2013	Mike Will Made It, Future, Drake, Jeezy, Schoolboy Q, Juicy J, Diddy, Pastor Troy	#MikeWillBeenTrill
"What It Do"	2014	Trae tha Truth	Goodnight Don't Exist in ATL 3
"I Ain't Going"	2014	none	The Official Super Bowl XLVIII Mixtape
"Watch Me Do It"	2014	Maino, French Montana	King of Brooklyn
"P.I.M.P."	2014	Rocko	Lingo 4 Dummys
"Hell You Sayin'"	2014	Iggy Azalea, Young Dro, Travi$ Scott	SXEW Vol. 1: The Grand Hustle
"Yayo" (Remix)	2014	Snootie Wild, Yo Gotti	SXEW Vol. 1: The Grand Hustle
"I Wanna Know"	2014	Raekwon, Doe B	SXEW Vol. 1: The Grand Hustle
"OG Bobby Johnson" (ATL Remix)	2014	Que, Young Jeezy	—N/a
"Drunk in Love" (Remix)	2014	Beyoncé, Jay-Z	—N/a
"Whenever Wherever"	2014	Doe B, Spodee	DOAT 3 (Definition of a Trapper)
"Love to Hate Me"	2014	Doe B, Big Kuntry King, Mitchelle'l	DOAT 3 (Definition of a Trapper)
"All Gas"	2014	Doe B, Problem, Shad da God, Trae tha Truth	DOAT 3 (Definition of a Trapper)
"Still Ballin"	2014	Doe B, King South	DOAT 3 (Definition of a Trapper)
"Girlfriend" (Hustle Gang Remix)	2014	Watch The Duck	SXEW Vol. 2
"Danny Glover"	2014	none	SXEW Vol. 2
"Thirsty"	2014	Young Dro	Black Label
"Ain't Gon Do It" (Remix)	2014	Yung Booke	Goodnight Don't Exist in ATL 4
"Jungle Fever" (Remix)	2014	Que	Goodnight Don't Exist in ATL 4
"The Worst" (Remix)	2014	Jhené Aiko	Goodnight Don't Exist in ATL 4
"A.K.A."	2014	Jennifer Lopez	A.K.A.
"Eww Eww Eww" (Remix)	2014	Zuse, Young Thug	Plugged
"Got Me a Check"	2014	Yung Booke, Shad da God	Goodnight Don't Exist in ATL 5
"Can't Stay"	2014	Ty Dolla Sign	Sign Language
"Don't Tell 'Em" (Remix)	2014	Jeremih, YG	CSA (Clubs, Studios, Airports)
"Am I Wrong" (Remix)	2014	Nico & Vinz	CSA (Clubs, Studios, Airports)
"Addicted"	2014	Jeezy, YG	Seen It All: The Autobiography
"Trouble"	2014	Migos	—N/a
"Quintana, Pt. 2"	2014	Travi$ Scott	Days Before Rodeo
"Really"	2014	The Game, Yo Gotti, 2 Chainz, Soulja Boy	Blood Moon: Year of the Wolf
"Electric Blue"	2014	Nicole Scherzinger	Big Fat Lie
"Life Ain't Easy"	2014	Spodee	The B.I.D.
"Priorities"	2014	Spodee	The B.I.D.
"Me Nuh Play"	2014	Zuse	Illegal Immigrant
"What You Gon Do Bout It"	2014	Zuse, Trae tha Truth, Spodee	Illegal Immigrant
"One More"	2015	Ne-Yo	Non-Fiction
"Bottoms Up (Remix)"	2015	Brantley Gilbert	Just as I Am (Platinum Edition)
"Bunkin'"	2015	Chris Brown, Tyga, Jay 305	Fan of a Fan: The Album
"Hennessy"	2015	Problem, Rich Homie Quan	OT
"Dope Boy Shit" (Remix)	2015	Bankroll Fresh	—N/a
"Off-Set"	2015	Young Thug	Furious 7 (Original Motion Picture Soundtrack)
"On the Bible"	2015	Tech N9ne, Zuse	Special Effects
"La Policia" (Remix)	2015	Kap G, David Banner	Real Migo Shit 3
"Can't Tell"	2015	Young Thug, Boosie Badazz	Barter 6
"Spoil You"	2015	Boosie Badazz	Touchdown 2 Cause Hell
"Edibles"	2015	Snoop Dogg	Bush
"I Know U Ain't Gon Act Like"	2015	Hardo	Trapnati
"If You Didn't"	2015	Young Thug	—N/a
"Mind Right" (Remix)	2015	TK-N-Cash, B.o.B, T-Pain	—N/a
"Issues"	2015	Skeme, RJ	Ingleworld 2
"Mad Generation"	2015	Victoria Monet	Nightmares & Lullabies: Act II
"Spillin Drank"	2015	Mitchelle'l, Big K.R.I.T.	—N/a
"Late Night King"	2015	Trae tha Truth, Jeremih, Ty Dolla Sign	Tha Truth
"Why You Mad (Infinity Remix)"	2015	Mariah Carey, French Montana, Justin Bieber	—N/a
"Till I Die"	2015	K Camp	Only Way Is Up
"Gold BBS's"	2015	Shad da God	2000 and God
"Don't Blame Luv"	2015	Watch The Duck	The Trojan Horse
"Hustler"	2015	Watch The Duck	The Trojan Horse
"Twerk Something"	2015	Pimp C	Long Live the Pimp
"Blasé" (Remix)	2015	Ty Dolla Sign, French Montana, ASAP Ferg	—N/a
"Dipped in Gold"	2015	P. Reign, Young Thug	Off the Books
"Back to Business"	2016	Dr. Dre, Justus, Victoria Monet, Sly Piper	—N/a
"How Many Times (Remix)"	2016	5ive Mics, King Louie	—N/a
"Let Me Live"	2016	Trae tha Truth, B.o.B, Ink	Tha Truth, Pt. 2
"Forever and a Day"	2016	J.U.S.T.I.C.E. League	J.U.S.T.I.C.E. for All
"Cut It (Remix)"	2016	O.T. Genasis, Lil Wayne	—N/a
"Long Time Ago"	2016	Trae tha Truth	Another 48 Hours
"Can I"	2016	DJ Drama, Young Thug	Quality Street Music 2
"Bobby Womack"	2016	Young Thug	Margiela Music 3
"Designer Designer"	2016	Big Kuntry King	Lil Dope Boy Kane
"I Will"	2016	My Guy Mars	No Days Off
"Foreva"	2016	Young Dolph	Rich Crack Baby
"Get Racks"	2016	O.T. Genasis	Coke N Butter
"Ladies"	2016	B.o.B	Don't Call It A Christmas Album
"Girlfriend (Remix)"	2016	Kap G, 2 Chainz, Ty Dolla $ign, Quavo	Goodnight Don't Exist in ATL 11
"Iced Out My Arms"	2017	DJ Khaled, Future, Migos, 21 Savage	Grateful
"Wildin'"	2017	Trouble	16
"Trenches (Remix)"	2017	Peanut da Don	Goodnight Don't Exist in ATL 12
"Stop It'"	2017	French Montana	Jungle Rules
"How to Be a Player"	2017	Too Short, E-40, Ray J	The Pimp Tape
"Don't Make You Real"	2017	Young Thug	—N/a
"Ghetto"	2017	Trae tha Truth, Wyclef, Ink	Tha Truth, Pt. 3
"Rake It Up (Remix)"	2017	Yo Gotti, Nicki Minaj, Too Short	—N/a
"Big Bank"	2017	Big K.R.I.T.	4eva Is a Mighty Long Time
"Care to Say About It"	2018	Rapsody	Rapture (Netflix soundtrack)
"Annoying"	2018	Dave East	P2
"ASAP Forever Remix"	2018	ASAP Rocky, Moby, Kid Cudi	Testing
"Laugh at You"	2018	none	Madden NFL 19
"Recognize"	2018	Bun B, Big KRIT	Return of the Trill
"What I Been Thru"	2018	London Jae, B.o.B	Gunz & Roses
"Catch this Wave"	2018	Translee	Freedom Summer
"Ladies, Ladies, Ladies"	2019	JID	Revenge of the Dreamers III
"Cut Me a Break"	2019	Free Nationals	Free Nationals
"All In"	2020	Nasty C	Zulu Man with Some Power
"Gotta Keep Pushing"	2022	Snoop Dogg, Sleepy Brown	BODR
"Wild Chapter"	2022	Conway the Machine, Novel	God Don't Make Mistakes
"No Weakness"	2023	DJ Drama, Symba, Wiz Khalifa	I'm Really Like That
"Maynard Vignette"	2023	Killer Mike, JID, Jacquees	Michael
"RIP Big & Mack"	2025	Young Thug	UY SCUTI
"MON3Y TALK$"	2026	Mike WiLL Made-It, Young Dro, Killer Mike	R3SET
"Backwards"	2026	Quavo	Qrömelife

== Production discography ==
List of production and non-performing songwriting credits (excluding features, interpolations, and samples)
Track(s)	Year	Credit	Artist(s)	Album
8. "Do It (Stick It Baby)"	2001	Producer (with DJ Toomp)	T.I.	I'm Serious
16. "Grand Royal"	2001	Producer	T.I.	I'm Serious
1. "Trap Muzik"; (featuring Mac Boney)	2003	Producer (with DJ Toomp and Sanchez Holmes)	T.I.	Trap Muzik
12. "T.I. vs. T.I.P."	2003	Producer	T.I.	Trap Muzik
2. "Let's Get Down"; (featuring Baby)	2003	Songwriter	Bow Wow	Unleashed
3. "Eighteen"	2003	Songwriter	Bow Wow	Unleashed
9. "Hey Little Man"	2003	Songwriter	Bow Wow	Unleashed
10. "I Got Y'all"	2003	Songwriter	Bow Wow	Unleashed
11. "I'll Move On"; (featuring Mario)	2003	Songwriter	Bow Wow	Unleashed
—N/a	2006	Executive producer	Young Dro	Best Thang Smokin'
—N/a	2006	Executive producer	Gio Washington	Son of Pain
8. "Wanna Move"; (featuring Ciara, Big Boi, and Scar)	2006	Songwriter	Diddy	Press Play
1. "Act I: T.I.P."	2007	Producer (with Caviar, Corey "OZ" Simon, and Just Blaze)	T.I.	T.I. vs. T.I.P.
8. "Act II: T.I."	2007	Producer (with Caviar, Corey "OZ" Simon, and Just Blaze)	T.I.	T.I. vs. T.I.P.
15. "Act III: T.I. vs. T.I.P.: The Confrontation"	2007	Producer (with Caviar, Corey "OZ" Simon, and Just Blaze)	T.I.	T.I. vs. T.I.P.
—N/a	2007	Executive producer	Wyclef Jean	Carnival Vol. II: Memoirs of an Immigrant
5. "Kryptonite"; (featuring Rich Boy)	2007	Songwriter	Mario	Go
10. "What Ya Gonna Do"; (featuring T.I.)	2008	Producer	Maino	Tuck Ya Chain In
—N/a	2008	Executive producer	Big Kuntry King	My Turn to Eat
4. "Been Doin' This"; (featuring T.I.)	2009	Producer (with Marz)	Bow Wow	New Jack City II
—N/a	2009	Executive producer	B.G.	Too Hood 2 Be Hollywood
11. "5th Dimension"; (featuring Ricco Barrino)	2010	Producer (with B.o.B and Lil' C)	B.o.B	The Adventures of Bobby Ray
3. "She's So Fly" (featuring T.I.)	2011	Producer (with Smash Factory)	Nelly	5.0
4. "I Can't Help It" (featuring Rocko)	2011	Producer (with Smash Factory)	T.I.	No Mercy
"Where the Boyz At?"	2012	Songwriter	The OMG Girlz	Non-album single
—N/a	2012	Executive producer	B.o.B	Strange Clouds
14. "Castles"; (featuring Trey Songz)	2012	Producer (with Ryan Tedder and Noel Zancanella)	B.o.B	Strange Clouds
16. "What's Happening" (featuring T.I.)	2012	Producer	Prodigy	H.N.I.C. 3
—N/a	2012	Executive producer	Iggy Azalea	Glory
11. "Forever"	2012	Songwriter	Keyshia Cole	Woman to Woman (Deluxe)
13. "Yeap"	2013	Producer (with Smash Factory)	Hustle Gang	G.D.O.D. (Get Dough or Die)
—N/a	2014	Executive producer	Iggy Azalea	The New Classic
3. "100" (featuring Watch the Duck)	2014	Songwriter	Iggy Azalea	The New Classic
—N/a	2015	Executive producer	Travis Scott	Rodeo
1. "Pornography"	2015	Narrator	Travis Scott	Rodeo
4. "Wasted"; (featuring Juicy J)	2015	Narrator	Travis Scott	Rodeo
14. "Apple Pie"	2015	Narrator	Travis Scott	Rodeo
—N/a	2015	Executive producer	Watch the Duck	The Trojan Horse EP
3. "6 Shots"; (featuring Schoolboy Q and Candice Pillay)	2015	Songwriter	Watch the Duck	The Trojan Horse EP
—N/a	2015	Executive producer	Young Dro	Da Reality Show
—N/a	2016	Executive producer	Travis Scott	Birds in the Trap Sing McKnight
5. "When the Going Gets Tough"	2017	Songwriter	Nick Blaemire (as "Sheldon Plankton")	SpongeBob SquarePants, The New Musical (Original Cast Recording)
—N/a	2018	Executive producer	Travis Scott	Astroworld
All tracks	2018	Producer (with Chris Hunter), executive producer	Translee	Freedom Summer
"Lover Boy"	2023	Songwriter	The OMG Girlz	TBA

== See also ==
- T.I. videography
- List of awards and nominations received by T.I.
- P$C discography
- Bankroll Mafia discography

== Notes ==
- A "I'm Serious" did not enter the Hot R&B/Hip-Hop Songs chart, but peaked at number 10 on the Bubbling Under R&B/Hip-Hop Singles chart, which acts as a 25-song extension to the Hot R&B/Hip-Hop Songs chart.
- B "That's All She Wrote" did not enter the Hot R&B/Hip-Hop Songs chart, but peaked at number 1 on the Bubbling Under R&B/Hip-Hop Singles chart, which acts as a 25-song extension to the Hot R&B/Hip-Hop Songs chart.
- C "Poppin Bottles" did not enter the Billboard Hot 100, but peaked at number 15 on the Bubbling Under Hot 100 Singles chart, which acts as a 25-song extension to the Hot 100.
- D "Pac's Life" did not enter the Billboard Hot 100, but peaked at number 19 on the Bubbling Under Hot 100 Singles chart, which acts as a 25-song extension to the Hot 100.
- E "Whatever U Like" did not enter the Billboard Hot 100, but peaked at number 4 on the Bubbling Under Hot 100 Singles chart, which acts as a 25-song extension to the Hot 100. It did not enter the Hot R&B/Hip-Hop Songs chart, but peaked at number 13 on the Bubbling Under R&B/Hip-Hop Singles chart, which acts as a 25-song extension to the Hot R&B/Hip-Hop Songs chart.
- F "That's Right" did not enter the Hot R&B/Hip-Hop Songs chart, but peaked at number 5 on the Bubbling Under R&B/Hip-Hop Singles chart, which acts as a 25-song extension to the Hot R&B/Hip-Hop Songs chart.
- G "Make Up Bag" did not enter the Billboard Hot 100, but peaked at number 3 on the Bubbling Under Hot 100 Singles chart, which acts as a 25-song extension to the Hot 100.
- H "Ready Set Go" did not enter the Hot R&B/Hip-Hop Songs chart, but peaked at number 10 on the Bubbling Under R&B/Hip-Hop Singles chart, which acts as a 25-song extension to the Hot R&B/Hip-Hop Songs chart.
- I "F.A.M.E." did not enter the Billboard Hot 100, but peaked at number 19 on the Bubbling Under Hot 100 Singles chart, which acts as a 25-song extension to the Hot 100.
- J "Back 2 Life (Live It Up)" did not enter the Billboard Hot 100, but peaked at number 9 on the Bubbling Under Hot 100 Singles chart, which acts as a 25-song extension to the Hot 100. It did not enter the Hot R&B/Hip-Hop Songs chart, but peaked at number 8 on the Bubbling Under R&B/Hip-Hop Singles chart, which acts as a 25-song extension to the Hot R&B/Hip-Hop Songs chart.
- K "Ride wit Me" did not enter the Billboard Hot 100, but peaked at number 11 on the Bubbling Under Hot 100 Singles chart, which acts as a 25-song extension to the Hot 100. It did not enter the Hot R&B/Hip-Hop Songs chart, but peaked at number 11 on the Bubbling Under R&B/Hip-Hop Singles chart, which acts as a 25-song extension to the Hot R&B/Hip-Hop Songs chart.
- L "Front Back" did not enter the Hot R&B/Hip-Hop Songs chart, but peaked at number 11 on the Bubbling Under R&B/Hip-Hop Singles chart, which acts as a 25-song extension to the Hot R&B/Hip-Hop Songs chart.
- M "Wish You Would" did not enter the Billboard Hot 100, but peaked at number 14 on the Bubbling Under Hot 100 Singles chart, which acts as a 25-song extension to the Hot 100. It did not enter the Hot R&B/Hip-Hop Songs chart, but peaked at number 18 on the Bubbling Under R&B/Hip-Hop Singles chart, which acts as a 25-song extension to the Hot R&B/Hip-Hop Songs chart.
- N "Ya Hear Me" did not enter the Billboard Hot 100, but peaked at number 18 on the Bubbling Under Hot 100 Singles chart, which acts as a 25-song extension to the Hot 100.
- O "I Can't Help It" did not enter the Billboard Hot 100, but peaked at number 3 on the Bubbling Under Hot 100 Singles chart, which acts as a 25-song extension to the Hot 100.
- P "No Mercy" did not enter the Billboard Hot 100, but peaked at number 23 on the Bubbling Under Hot 100 Singles chart, which acts as a 25-song extension to the Hot 100.
- Q "Here Ye, Hear Ye" did not enter the Hot R&B/Hip-Hop Songs chart, but peaked at number 19 on the Bubbling Under R&B/Hip-Hop Singles chart, which acts as a 25-song extension to the Hot R&B/Hip-Hop Songs chart.
- R "Like That" did not enter the Billboard Hot 100, but peaked at number 13 on the Bubbling Under Hot 100 Singles chart, which acts as a 25-song extension to the Hot 100. It did not enter the Hot R&B/Hip-Hop Songs chart, but peaked at number 5 on the Bubbling Under R&B/Hip-Hop Singles chart, which acts as a 25-song extension to the Hot R&B/Hip-Hop Songs chart.
- S "Stomp" did not enter the Hot R&B/Hip-Hop Songs chart, but peaked at number 10 on the Bubbling Under R&B/Hip-Hop Singles chart, which acts as a 25-song extension to the Hot R&B/Hip-Hop Songs chart.
- T "Touchdown" did not enter the Billboard Hot 100, but peaked at number 9 on the Bubbling Under Hot 100 Singles chart, which acts as a 25-song extension to the Hot 100.
- U "56 Bars (Intro)" did not enter the Billboard Hot 100, but peaked at number 19 on the Bubbling Under Hot 100 Singles chart, which acts as a 25-song extension to the Hot 100.
- V "My Life Your Entertainment" did not enter the Billboard Hot 100, but peaked at number 19 on the Bubbling Under Hot 100 Singles chart, which acts as a 25-song extension to the Hot 100.
- W "I'm Illy" did not enter the Hot R&B/Hip-Hop Songs chart, but peaked at number 12 on the Bubbling Under R&B/Hip-Hop Singles chart, which acts as a 25-song extension to the Hot R&B/Hip-Hop Songs chart.
- X "In My Bag" did not enter the Hot R&B/Hip-Hop Songs chart, but peaked at number 7 on the Bubbling Under R&B/Hip-Hop Singles chart, which acts as a 25-song extension to the Hot R&B/Hip-Hop Songs chart.
- Y "Freeze Me" did not enter the Hot R&B/Hip-Hop Songs chart, but peaked at number 14 on the Bubbling Under R&B/Hip-Hop Singles chart, which acts as a 25-song extension to the Hot R&B/Hip-Hop Songs chart.
- Z "Welcome to the World" did not enter the Billboard Hot 100, but peaked at number 17 on the Bubbling Under Hot 100 Singles chart, which acts as a 25-song extension to the Hot 100.
- AA "Castle Walls" did not enter the Billboard Hot 100, but peaked at number 5 on the Bubbling Under Hot 100 Singles chart, which acts as a 25-song extension to the Hot 100.
- AB "Pyro" did not enter the Hot R&B/Hip-Hop Songs chart, but peaked at number 13 on the Bubbling Under R&B/Hip-Hop Singles chart, which acts as a 25-song extension to the Hot R&B/Hip-Hop Songs chart.
- AC "Fireworkz" (Remix) did not enter the Hot R&B/Hip-Hop Songs chart, but peaked at number 3 on the Bubbling Under R&B/Hip-Hop Singles chart, which acts as a 25-song extension to the Hot R&B/Hip-Hop Songs chart.
- AD "Arena" did not enter the Billboard Hot 100, but peaked at number 16 on the Bubbling Under Hot 100 Singles chart, which acts as a 25-song extension to the Hot 100.
- AE "Plain Jane" did not enter the Hot R&B/Hip-Hop Songs chart, but peaked at number 10 on the Bubbling Under R&B/Hip-Hop Singles chart, which acts as a 25-song extension to the Hot R&B/Hip-Hop Songs chart.

-->

- BE "Bitches & Bottles (Let's Get It Started)" did not enter the Billboard Hot 100, but peaked at number 9 on the Bubbling Under Hot 100 Singles chart, which acts as a 25-song extension to the Hot 100.
