= T.I. videography =

T.I. video discography
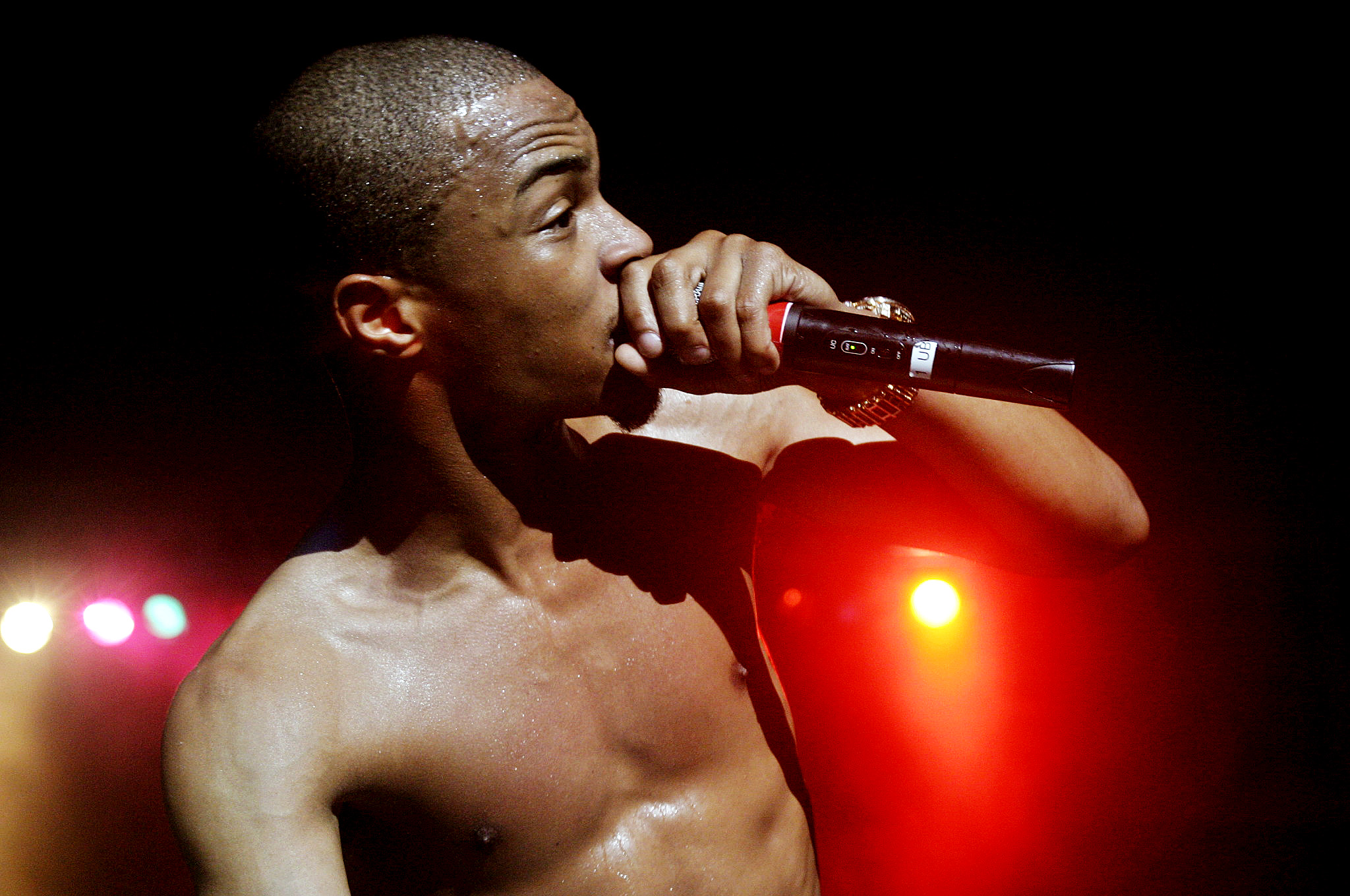
- T.I. performing in 2006
- Music videos: 137
- Video albums: 1
- Films: 15

American rapper T.I. has released many music videos, working with various directors. He has also been featured in several music videos for other prominent recording artists. T.I.'s first solo music video was for his debut single "I'm Serious", released in 2001 and directed by American music video director Chris Robinson. T.I's first lead role was in his first featured film, ATL, which was also directed by Chris Robinson.

== Albums ==
=== Music video albums ===
Title	Album details
The Crown Collection	Released: September 8, 2008; Label: Atlantic; Format: DVD, digital download

== Music videos ==
=== As lead artist ===
List of music videos, with directors, showing year released
Title	Year	Director(s)
"I'm Serious" (featuring Beenie Man)	2001	Chris Robinson
"Dope Boyz"	2001	Thomas Forbes
"Be Easy"	2003	Nick Quested
"24's"	2003	Fat Cats
"Rubberband Man"	2003	Darren Grant
"Let's Get Away" (featuring Jazze Pha)	2004	Darren Grant
"Bring Em Out"	2004	Fat Cats
"U Don't Know Me"	2004	Ben Mor
"ASAP" (featuring P$C)	2005	Craig Ross, Jr.
"Front Back" (featuring UGK)	2006	Dr. Teeth
"What You Know"	2006	Chris Robinson
"Why You Wanna"	2006	Chris Robinson
"Live in the Sky" (featuring Jamie Foxx)	2006	Chris Robinson
"Top Back" (Remix) (featuring Young Jeezy, Young Dro, Big Kuntry King and B.G.)	2006	Kevin Hunter
"Big Shit Poppin' (Do It)"	2007	Erik White
"You Know What It Is" (featuring Wyclef Jean)	2007	Chris Robinson
"Hurt"	2007	Thomas Forbes
"No Matter What"	2008	Self, James Lopez
"Whatever You Like"	2008	Dave Meyers
"What Up, What's Haapnin'"	2008	Kai Crawford
"Live Your Life" (featuring Rihanna)	2008	Anthony Mandler
"Dead and Gone" (featuring Justin Timberlake)	2009	Chris Robinson
"Remember Me" (featuring Mary J. Blige)	2009	Jessy Terrero
"Hell of a Life"	2009	Erik White
"I'm Back"	2010	Kai Regan
"Yeah Ya Know (Takers)"	2010	—N/a
"Got Your Back" (featuring Keri Hilson)	2010	Chris Robinson
"Ya Hear Me"	2010	Adam Donald
"Get Back Up" (featuring Chris Brown)	2010	Chris Robinson
"I Can't Help It" (featuring Rocko)	2010	—N/a
"No Mercy" (featuring The-Dream)	2010	—N/a
"Pledge Allegiance" (featuring Rick Ross)	2010	Motion Family
"Lay Me Down" (featuring Rico Love)	2010	—N/a
"Castle Walls" (featuring Christina Aguilera) (Filmed but unreleased)	2010	—N/a
"I'm Flexin'" (featuring Big K.R.I.T.)	2011	Motion Family
"Here Ye, Hear Ye" (featuring Sk8brd)	2011	Adam Donald
"Fuck da City Up" (featuring Young Jeezy)	2012	Triggerhappy
"Hot Wheels" (featuring Travis Porter and Young Dro)	2012	Alex Smith
"Love This Life"	2012	Ryan Hope
"Go Get It"	2012	Alex Nazari
"Ball" (featuring Lil Wayne)	2012	Marc Klasfeld
"Trap Back Jumpin"	2012	Clifton Bell
"Addresses"	2013	Clifton Bell
"Memories Back Then" (with B.o.B and Kendrick Lamar, featuring Kris Stephens)	2013	Philly Fly Boy
"Wit' Me" (featuring Lil Wayne)	2013	Philly Fly Boy
"Hello" (featuring Cee Lo Green)	2013	Marc Klasfeld
"Check This, Dig That" (featuring Trae tha Truth)	2013	Philly Fly Boy
"Problems" (with B.o.B, Problem, Mac Boney and Trae tha Truth)	2013	Philly Fly Boy
"Kemosabe" (with B.o.B, Birdman, Doe B and Young Dro)	2013	T.I. and Philly Fly Boy
"Away" (with Spodee and Trae tha Truth)	2013	—N/a
"The Way We Ride"	2013	Hustle Gang and Philly Fly Boy
"Turn It"	2014	Philly Fly Boy
"About the Money" (featuring Young Thug)	2014	T.I. and Kennedy Rothchild
"Chosen" (with B.o.B and Spodee)	2014	Philly Fly Boy
"No Mediocre" (featuring Iggy Azalea)	2014	Director X
"King"	2014	T.I. and Philly Fly Boy
"I Need War" (with Young Thug)	2014	Philly Fly Boy
"G Shit" (featuring Jeezy and Watch The Duck)	2015	Chris Robinson
"On Doe, On Phil" (featuring Trae the Truth)	2015	Philly Fly Boy
"Private Show" (featuring Chris Brown)	2015	Emil Nava
"I Don't Fuck wit You" (with B.o.B, Spodee, Yung Booke, Shad da God and Big Kuntry King)	2015	—N/a
"Project Steps"	2015	Philly Fly Boy
"Check, Run It"	2015	Philly Fly Boy, T.I.
"Broadcast Live"	2015	Philly Fly Boy, T.I.
"Money Talk"	2016	Derek Blanks
"Dope"	2016	Jessy Terrero
"We Will Not"	2016	—N/a
"Warzone"	2016	Laurel Richardson
"Black Man" (featuring Quavo, Meek Mill & Rara)	2016	—N/a
"Switchin' Lanes" (featuring Big K.R.I.T. & Trev Case)	2016	Nery Madrid
"I Believe"	2017	Mike Ho
"Us Or Else" (featuring London Jae, Translee, Charlie Wilson & B.o.B)	2017	Mike Ho
"Writer" (featuring Translee and B.o.B)	2017	Laureal Richardson
"Certified" (featuring Jacquees)	2017	The Marxmen
"Jefe" (featuring Meek Mill)	2018	Nathan R. Smith
"The Weekend" (featuring Young Thug)	2018	Kid Art
"The Amazing Mr. Fuck Up" (featuring Victoria Monét)	2018	Mike Ho
"You (Be There)" (featuring London Jae)	2019	Teyana Taylor
"Ring" (featuring Young Thug)	2020	Philly Fly Boy
"Pardon" (featuring Lil Baby)	2020	Philly Fly Boy
"Hypno" (featuring Rahky)	2020	Hype Williams
"What It's Come To"	2021	T.I.

=== As featured artist ===
List of music videos, with directors, showing year released
Title	Year	Director(s)
"Never Scared" (Bone Crusher featuring Killer Mike and T.I.)	2003	Bryan Barber
"Round Here" (Memphis Bleek featuring Trick Daddy and T.I.)	2003	—N/a
"Soldier" (Destiny's Child featuring T.I. and Lil Wayne)	2004	Ray Kay
"3 Kings" (Slim Thug featuring T.I. and Bun B)	2005	—N/a
"Touch" (Amerie featuring T.I.)	2005	Chris Robinson
"Shoulder Lean" (Young Dro featuring T.I.)	2006	President Thomas Forbes
"Pac's Life" (2Pac featuring Ashanti and T.I.)	2006	Gobi Rahmi
"Drive Slow" (Kanye West and Paul Wall featuring GLC and T.I.)	2006	Hype Williams
"My Love" (Justin Timberlake featuring T.I.)	2006	Paul Hunter
"We Fly High (Remix)" (Jim Jones featuring T.I., Juelz Santana, Diddy, Birdman and Young Dro)	2006	Dale Restighini and Jim Jones
"I'm a Flirt (Remix)" (R. Kelly featuring T.I. and T-Pain)	2007	Benny Boom
"We Takin' Over" (DJ Khaled featuring Akon, T.I., Rick Ross, Fat Joe, Birdman and Lil Wayne)	2007	Gil Green
"Make It Rain (Remix)" (Fat Joe featuring Lil Wayne, R. Kelly, T.I., Birdman, Rick Ross and Ace Mac)	2007	R. Malcolm Jones
"Whatever U Like" (Nicole Scherzinger featuring T.I.)	2007	Paul Hunter
"5000 Ones" (DJ Drama featuring Nelly, T.I., Yung Joc, Willie the Kid, Young Jeezy, Diddy and Twista)	2007	Dale Resteghini
"I'll Be Lovin' U Long Time" (Mariah Carey featuring T.I.)	2008	Chris Applebaum
"Ain't I" (Yung L.A. featuring Young Dro and T.I.)	2008	Kai Crawford
"Hi Hater (Remix)" (Maino featuring T.I., Swizz Beatz, Plies, Jadakiss and Fabolous)	2008	Mazik Saevitz
"Just Like Me" (Jamie Foxx featuring T.I.)	2008	Brett Ratner
"Day Dreaming" (DJ Drama featuring Akon, Snoop Dogg and T.I.)	2009	Dale Resteghini
"Bet I" (B.o.B featuring T.I. and Playboy Tre)	2010	Gabriel Hart
"Make Up Bag" (The-Dream featuring T.I.)	2010	Lil' X
"Get Yo Girl" (Rich Kid Shawty featuring T.I.)	2010	—N/a
"Ready Set Go" (Killer Mike featuring T.I.)	2010	Motion Family
"F.A.M.E." (Young Jeezy featuring T.I.)	2011	Lance Drake
"Magic" (Future featuring T.I.)	2012	Decatur Dan
"Strange Clouds" (Remix) (B.o.B featuring T.I. and Young Jeezy)	2012	1st Impressions
"We in This Bitch" (DJ Drama featuring Young Jeezy, T.I., Ludacris and Future)	2012	Benny Boom
"Back 2 Life (Live It Up)" (Sean Kingston featuring T.I.)	2012	Benny Boom
"2 Reasons" (Trey Songz featuring T.I.)	2012	Benny Boom
"Big Beast" (Killer Mike featuring T.I., Bun B and Trouble)	2012	Thomas C. Bingham
"Murda Bizness" (Iggy Azalea featuring T.I.)	2012	Alex/2Tone
"Bitches & Bottles (Let's Get It Started)" (DJ Khaled featuring Lil Wayne, T.I., Future and Ace Hood)	2012	Gil Green
"We Still in This Bitch" (B.o.B featuring T.I. and Juicy J)	2013	Decatur Dan
"Blurred Lines" (Robin Thicke featuring T.I. and Pharrell)	2013	Diane Martel
"Upper Echelon" (Travi$ Scott featuring T.I. and 2 Chainz)	2013	Travi$ Scott
"Change Your Life" (Iggy Azalea featuring T.I.)	2013	Jonas & François
"I Wish" (Cher Lloyd featuring T.I.)	2013	Gil Green
"King Shit" (Yo Gotti featuring T.I.)	2013	Sam Lecca
"I Can't Describe (The Way I Feel)" (Jennifer Hudson featuring T.I.)	2014	Anthony Mandler
"Coke Bottle" (Agnez Mo featuring Timbaland and T.I.)	2014	Colin Tilley
"Episode" (E-40 featuring Chris Brown and T.I.)	2014	Ben Griffin
"Girlfriend??" (Watch The Duck featuring T.I.)	2014	—N/a
"Homicide" (Doe B featuring T.I.)	2014	PhillyFlyBoy
"UV Love" (Clinton Sparks featuring T.I.)	2014	Sherif Higazy
"This Girl" (Stafford Brothers featuring Eva Simons and T.I.)	2014	CTRL
"Ejeajo" (P-Square featuring T.I.)	2014	Clarence Peters, Jude 'Engees' Okoye
"That's My Shit" (The-Dream featuring T.I.)	2015	Alex Herron
"On the Bible" (Tech N9ne featuring Zuse and T.I.)	2015	—N/a
"Bankrolls on Deck" (Bankroll Mafia featuring T.I., PeeWee Roscoe, Young Thug and Shad da God)	2015	Kennedy Rothchild
"Young & Stupid" (Travis Mills featuring T.I.)	2015	Young Man, Juice, Travis Mills
"California" (Colonel Loud featuring T.I., Young Dolph and Ricco Barrino)	2015	Iconick
"Till I Die" (K Camp featuring T.I.)	2015	Payne Lindsey
"Foreva" (Young Dolph featuring T.I.)	2016	Howard Ross
"Get Racks" (O.T. Genasis featuring T.I.)	2016	—N/a
"Hustler" (Watch The Duck featuring T.I.)	2017	Drew Kirsch
"For The Money" (Ra Ra featuring T.I.)	2017	Kid Art

=== As director ===
List of music videos directed by T.I., showing year released
Title	Year	Director(s)
"FTCU" (Zonnique)	2020	T.I.

== Filmography ==
Film
Year	Title	Role	Director	Notes
2006	ATL	Rashad Swann	Chris Robinson	
2007	American Gangster	Stevie Lucas	Ridley Scott	
2010	Takers	Ghost	John Luessenhop	Also producer
2013	Identity Thief	Julian	Seth Gordon	
2015	The Corner Man	Narration	Herm Harris	
2015	Get Hard	Russell	Etan Cohen	
2015	Entourage	Himself	Doug Ellin	Cameo
2015	Ant-Man	Dave	Peyton Reed	
2016	Popstar: Never Stop Never Stopping	Himself	Jorma Taccone and Akiva Schaffer	
2016	Ride Along 2	Tony David	Tim Story	Uncredited
2017	Sleepless	Sean Cass/Derrick Griffin	Baran bo Odar	
2018	Krystal	Willie	William H. Macy	
2018	Ant-Man and the Wasp	Dave	Peyton Reed	
2019	Dolemite Is My Name	Walter Crane	Craig Brewer	
2019	The Trap	Sonny	Erik White	
2020	Cut Throat City	'Cousin' Bass	RZA	
2020	Monster Hunter	Link	Paul W. S. Anderson	
2023	Fear	Lou	Deon Taylor	

Television
Year	Title	Role	Notes
2005	The O.C.	Himself	Episode: "The Return of the Nana"
2008	Entourage	Himself	Episode: "The All Out Fall Out"
2009	T.I.'s Road to Redemption	Himself	Lead role; 9 episodes
2009	Kathy Griffin: My Life on the D-List	Himself	Episode: "Kathy at the Apollo"
2011–2017	T.I. and Tiny: The Family Hustle	Himself	Lead role
2012–14	Single Ladies	Luke	3 episodes
2012	Boss	Trey	8 episodes
2012	Hawaii Five-0	Ray	Episode: "I Ka Wa Mamua"
2014	House of Lies	Lucas	6 episodes
2016	Roots	Cyrus	Miniseries
2016	The Eric Andre Show	Himself	Season 4, episode 1
2017	Tom Clancy's Ghost Recon Wildlands: War Within The Cartel	Marcus Johnson	TV movie
2017	The Breaks	Paul Anders	Season 1: 5 episodes
2018–2020	T.I. & Tiny: Friends & Family Hustle	Himself	Seasons 1–3
2018	The Grand Hustle	Himself	Season 1: 12 episodes
2021	Rhythm + Flow	Himself, judge	Netflix show

Video Games
Year	Title	Role	Notes
2007	Def Jam: Icon	Himself	Voice role and likeness
2017	Tom Clancy's Ghost Recon Wildlands	Marcus Jenssen	Voice role

== See also ==
- T.I. discography
- List of awards and nominations received by T.I.
- P$C discography
