= Ready set go =

Ready set go may refer to:

- Ready, Set, Go! (software), a computer application
- Ready Set Go! (band), an American pop band of siblings, now known as Echosmith

== Albums ==
- Ready, Set, Go with Patti Page, by Patti Page
- Ready Set Go!, an album by Roscoe Dash
- Ready Ready Set Go, an album by Prozzäk

== Songs ==
- "Ready, Set, Go!", a song by Tokio Hotel, English version of "Übers Ende der Welt"
- "Ready Set Go", by LC9
- "Ready Set Go", Royal Tailor featuring Capital Kings Royal Tailor
- "Ready Set Go", Killer Mike featuring T.I. T.I. videography
- "Ready Set Go", Tears from Heaven

== See also ==
- "Ready, Set, Don't Go", a song by Billy Ray Cyrus and Miley Cyrus
- Ready Steady Go!, a British rock/pop music television programme
