= Hell of a Life =

Hell of a Life may refer to:

- "Hell of a Life" (Kanye West song), a song from My Beautiful Dark Twisted Fantasy (2010)
- "Hell of a Life" (T.I. song), a song from Paper Trail: Case Closed (2009)
- "Hell of a Life", a song by Rita Ora from Phoenix (2018)
