= Go Get It (disambiguation) =

"Go Get It" is a 2012 song by rapper T.I.

Go Get It may also refer to:

- Go Get It (album), an album by Mary Mary, or the title track
- "Go Get It", a 2010 song by The Hrsmn
- "Go Get It", a 2012 song by JAE E with E-40 and Thaddeous Shade
- "Go Get It", a 2008 song by Ladi6
