= Trouble Man: Heavy Is the Head =

Studio album by T.I.
- Released: December 18, 2012
- Recorded: 2011–12
- Genres: Hip-hop; trap
- Length: 71:46
- Labels: Grand Hustle; Atlantic
- Producers: 1500 or Nothin'; DJ Toomp; Earl & E; Jazze Pha; Lil' C; Mars; Pharrell Williams; Rico Love; Planet VI; The Co-Captains; T-Minus; Nikhil Seetharam; DJ Montay; Jamezz Bonn; Mr. Jonz; Chuck Diesel; Tommy Brown; Travis Sayles; Sanchez Holmes; Cardiak; Chinky P; Sir Clef; Po Johns; Brian Kidd; The Futuristiks

T.I. chronology
No Mercy (2010)	Trouble Man: Heavy Is the Head (2012)	Paperwork (2014)

Singles from Trouble Man: Heavy Is the Head
- 1. "Go Get It" Released: July 17, 2012; 2. "Ball" Released: October 16, 2012; 3. "Trap Back Jumpin" Released: November 13, 2012; 4. "Sorry" Released: November 27, 2012; 5. "Hello" Released: December 11, 2012

Trouble Man: Heavy Is the Head is the eighth studio album by American rapper T.I. It was released on December 18, 2012, by Grand Hustle Records and Atlantic Records. The production was provided by some of T.I.'s longtime collaborators; including DJ Toomp, Jazze Pha, Pharrell Williams and Lil' C. These high-profile record producers such as T-Minus, Cardiak, No I.D., Rico Love, Planet VI, Tommy Brown and DJ Montay, also contributed to the album. The album features guest appearances from P!nk, Lil Wayne, André 3000, R. Kelly, Akon, Meek Mill, CeeLo Green, ASAP Rocky, Trae tha Truth, Victoria Monet and Grand Hustle's own D.O.P.E.

The album's first single, "Go Get It" (released on July 17, 2012), becoming a moderate hit, peaking at number 77 on the US Billboard Hot 100. The second single, "Ball" featuring Lil Wayne, was released on October 16, 2012. The single peaked at number 50 on the US Billboard Hot 100, logging 20 weeks on the chart. In April 2013, the single was certified gold by the Recording Industry Association of America (RIAA). The album was a commercial success, debuting at number two on the US Billboard 200, selling 179,000 copies in its first week of release. The album also debuted at number one on both the Top R&B/Hip-Hop Albums and the Top Rap Albums charts, respectively.

Upon its release, Trouble Man: Heavy Is the Head received "generally favorable reviews" from most music critics, where most music critics saw it as an improvement from his previous album No Mercy (2010). As of September 28, 2013, the album has sold 502,000 copies in the United States.

== Background ==
In August 2011, after being released from prison, T.I. began making up for lost time by appearing on remixes for everyone from Jay-Z and Kanye West ("Niggas in Paris") to Kesha ("Sleazy"); as well as recording 86 tracks for Trouble Man. In an interview with Rolling Stone, T.I. previously stated he was debating between two titles for the album, Kill the King and Trouble Man. T.I. later revealed to Billboard the title of the album to be the latter. The title was partly inspired by Marvin Gaye’s 1972 song of the same name.

When T.I. was asked about titling his album the same name as that of a Marvin Gaye song he said: "I felt like at that moment in time, Marvin Gaye's life embodied what the word 'Trouble Man' and what the song meant in all senses of the word. And today... I feel like the past six, seven years of my life, and the adversity...in my life that I have endured and overcame, that is synonymous and it embodies what the word 'Trouble Man' means today. Marvin Gaye did it for them back then, and I'm doing it for us right now," added T.I.. "Nothing but love and respect, and nothing but salutations and respect to Marvin Gaye and his whole family."

When T.I. spoke on the feel of the album he stated: "It has a more balanced blend of that vintage 'U Don't Know Me,' 'Top Back,' Trap Muzik sound with some of the more mainstream radio records that you heard from Paper Trail. It's more of a cohesive blend." In an interview with Rap-Up, T.I. revealed his thoughts on the album and claimed: "I think it’s a lot more urban than Paper Trail, and less apologetic than No Mercy. I think it’s more diversified than T.I. vs. T.I.P. though. It’s got a lotta heart, it’s got a lotta edge. It’s a creative album. It’s probably harder than most of the shit that’s coming out right now.

On October 23, 2012, T.I. held an NYC listening session, during which he described the inspiration for the album: "I've learned that one thing about my life that is certain is trouble...Be that as it may, I shall embrace that fact and not evade it. We all have faults. Before I let you stand on your high horse and point a finger back down at me, I'm going to give you a big, stiff 'Fuck you.'" On Power 105's The Breakfast Club, T.I. hinted that Trouble Man could be his last album, explaining that he wanted to quit rapping, believing that it is not how it once was:

This is what everyone fails to realize. I want out. I want out, man. What the game is going to and what has evolved into from a personality standpoint, it goes against what I represent. What I embody, this game contradicts that. I want out. I'm in it because I love music and I have obligations, contractually. It was at one time, this music was about speaking to the people who felt like you feel. Now, the people I'm speaking to, they don't necessarily feel like how I feel. In my day, if you were rapping about something you weren't really living, that was a strike against you. You were held accountable. Nowadays, nobody even expects you to live up to the things you rap about. That goes against what I represent, what I stand for. So if they outsell me, then that's just all the more better for me to fade to the back and cross my legs on my desk.

In December 2012, during his interview with Rap-Up, T.I. stated he recorded over 120 songs and had to narrow it down to 16 that would make Trouble Man: Heavy Is the Head. T.I. claimed that he's going to take unused material from Heavy is the Head and arrange it into a new album titled Trouble Man: He Who Wears the Crown: "Well, I had so much music man. I recorded like 120-something songs for this project, and I imagined that, you know, if just giving the amount of music that we had left over that we weren't able to put on this project, that we’d do a sequel. So, you know, the sequel to this album will be He Who Wears the Crown. That’s the primary reason for the subtitle. That's the purpose of the sequel, so we’ll have a platform to display and release these songs."

== Recording and production ==
On October 19, 2012, in an interview, West Coast rapper Kendrick Lamar revealed that he recorded a song with T.I. for the album. The song reportedly also features B.o.B and samples Gotye's hit single "Somebody That I Used to Know". The song's mass appeal attracted T.I. to the sample: "The record's just jamming. When I heard the twist they put on it, man, it was kind of a no-brainer." T.I. also chose the record for its crossover ability, which he has always been successful with in the past: "It sounds like hip-hop with an international twist to it, and I'm known for taking those types of records and bridging that gap between what we do and what they do," he explained, dropping in a couple of examples. "From M.I.A.'s 'Paper Planes' to 'Swagga Like Us,' we took [Crystal Waters'] 'Gypsy Woman' for 'Why You Wanna.'" Over the drum-heavy sample, Lamar and Bobby Ray join T.I. in sharing some nostalgic stories, which he says reminds him of some of a few renowned MCs and their classic projects: "[We're] taking turns on our story about a female that we knew years, years, years ago before we were who we are today. It kinda puts me in the mind of the 'Da Art Of Storytellin' [and The Art of Storytelling] from Outkast and Slick Rick. It puts me in the mind of that." The song, which failed to make the album's final track listing probably due to sample clearances, is titled "Memories Back Then". On December 17, 2012, T.I. stopped by Sway Calloway's Sway In The Morning radio show to promote the album, while there he premiered "Memories Back Then".

In December 2012, in an interview with Rap-Up, T.I. shared details about his collaboration with singer-songwriter Pink on the T-Minus-produced "Guns and Roses," which he describes as a "bittersweet romantic story." "We found that we had a few things in common," says T.I. of the pop-rocker. "We clicked. She real people, she from the streets. I’m a real cat, I’m from the streets. We found ourselves in rooms where we were like, ‘You know what? These people fake as hell in here. Let’s get out of here.’" In a listening session at NYC's Germano Studios, where T.I. played ten songs from the album for industry tastemakers and label executives, he stated he had big hopes for the song.

T.I. was also able to work with fellow Atlanta rapper, Outkast's André 3000 for the first time after years of trying to collaborate: "We've been trying to put this particular collaboration together since the King album. Every album since King I've called Andre and been like 'Hey, I'm working on an album, let's get together.' And he'd say 'Okay, let's see what we got that makes sense.' And we've met a handful of times. This is the first time that it ... came together. I'm extremely proud, honored, and privileged." And while T.I. admits that André 3000 out shined on "Sorry," he's not mad: "He did get down on me on my record, I can’t front," laughs Tip. "But to me I’m honored and it’s a pleasure that he would even choose my record to do that on." The song was co-produced by former Grand Hustle intern Sir Clef alongside Jazze Pha, the latter of whom has helmed tracks for T.I. such as "Chooz You" and "Let's Get Away".

T.I. also worked with his former Grand Hustle signee, Philadelphia-based rapper Meek Mill on the album. Before Rick Ross signed him to Maybach Music Group and he cut off his braids, T.I. took the Philadelphia rapper under his wing and showed him the ropes: "He was around to observe a lot and he took it and he used it to his advantage, which is extremely commendable." They ended up recording "G Season". "‘G Season’ is basically just two cats who are cut from a different cloth, separating themselves from the suckers," T.I. told Rap-Up TV. This collaboration would come together after they met each other at the club. T.I. said in an interview that Jay-Z was originally supposed to be featured on "G Season".

On "Can You Learn," which was originally going to be the title-track, T.I. and R. Kelly talk to the ladies from a different perspective: "This record sounds to me like what you would expect to hear if Tupac collaborated with Nate Dogg," said T.I. of the DJ Montay-produced track, which was inspired by his own leading lady, Tameka "Tiny" Cottle. "I really feel the connection between the music and the listener, especially if the listener is a lady or a gentleman who has had a lady who stuck by him through all of the ups and downs, the peaks and valleys that life has to offer. She’s proven herself to be a rider."

The production on the album was also handled by T.I.'s longtime friend and frequent collaborator DJ Toomp. Toomp produced two tracks, "Trap Back Jumpin" and the aggressive "Who Want Some," which T.I. affectionately referred to as the "What You Know" of this project. High-profile record producer No I.D. also worked with T.I. on the album, producing their first collaboration, "Wildside" featuring Harlem rapper ASAP Rocky.

== Release and promotion ==
In preparation for the album's release, T.I. released a promotional mixtape, titled Fuck da City Up, on January 1, 2012. During a sit-down with XXL, T.I. revealed a few collaborations for the album, including a song with André 3000 and announced R. Kelly to be featured on the title track. After initially announcing that the album would be released on September 4, 2012, T.I. announced on August 3, that it would be pushed back to a later date in 2012. He also stated that the reason for the delay was because he was still deciding between 86 different songs for the final album. On October 23, 2012, T.I. previewed twelve tracks from the album at its listening party in New York City, and also revealed their titles. The tracks previewed feature artists such as Kendrick Lamar, Cee Lo Green, André 3000, B.o.B, R. Kelly and ASAP Rocky.

== Singles ==
The album's intended first single, titled "Love This Life" (which was produced by production team 1500 or Nothin'), was released on April 3, 2012. The song is thematically reminiscent of T.I.'s 2008 hit single "Whatever You Like". Markman compared T.I.'s delivery to that on "Whatever You Like", calling it "much darker." Trent Fitzgerald of PopCrush called it "a great rap ballad that could make the toughest neighborhood thug want to buy candy and flowers for his girlfriend." The song peaked at number 81 on the US Billboard Hot 100 and number 39 on the Hot R&B/Hip-Hop Songs charts. The album's intended second single, titled "Like That" (which was produced by Grand Hustle in-house producers Lil' C and Mars of 1500 or Nothin'), was released on May 22, 2012. Both of these songs failed to make the standard track list, but being bonus tracks in the deluxe version.

On June 23, 2012, T.I.'s track, titled "Go Get It" was previously leaked and T.I. later released the track as the first official single from the album, releasing it on iTunes Store on July 17, 2012. The song was produced by Canadian hip hop and R&B producer T-Minus, who T.I. has previously collaborated with on the song "Poppin Bottles" featuring Drake, from his previous album No Mercy (2010). Before the video's release, the rapper uploaded a teaser video, followed by a behind-the-scenes video. The music video, directed by Alex Nazari, was released on August 16, 2012, via his YouTube account.

On June 21, 2012, it was announced by record producer Rico Love that the album's second single will be for the track, titled "Ball". The song features guest vocals from fellow American rapper Lil Wayne, with the production handled from Rico Love and Earl & E. On June 29, 2012, T.I. unveiled the single's original artwork, which was later changed on October 8, 2012, along with the announcement of the single's release date. T.I. previewed the song in the second season of his reality television series T.I. and Tiny: The Family Hustle on episode 5. The episode premiered on September 25, 2012, featuring the preview of it at a listening session in Chicago. On September 28, 2012, behind the scenes footage of the music video was released, after the photos of the video shoot were released. The video was shot at Hollygrove in New Orleans, featuring cameo appearances from Rico Love, Trae tha Truth, Mack Maine, Birdman and T.I.'s sons. The single was released on October 15, 2012, and was available to purchase at iTunes Store on October 16, 2012. The music video was released on October 22, 2012. The single was certified gold by the Recording Industry Association of America (RIAA) in April 2013.

The album's third single was announced by T.I. on November 9, 2012, when he unveiled the single's artwork via his Twitter account. The song, titled "Trap Back Jumpin'", previously leaked on September 14, 2012, before he performed it at the BET Hip Hop Awards. The single was available for digital download on November 13, 2012, as the album's third single.

On November 19, 2012, T.I. announced the next two singles for the album would be "Sorry". The song features a guest verse from fellow American rapper André 3000, with the production handled from frequent collaborator Jazze Pha, followed by "Hello" featuring vocals from Cee Lo Green and production from Pharrell Williams. "Sorry" was released as a single via iTunes on November 27, 2012. "Sorry" subsequently debuted at #36 on the Hot R&B/Hip-Hop Songs. On January 2, 2013, Andre 3000's Outkast cohort, Big Boi, took to his Twitter account to reveal he would be adding a verse to "Sorry", the song in which 3000 apologizes to him for past mistakes.

On December 20, 2012, in an interview with Power 105's The Breakfast Club, T.I. spoke on which song will be the next single off Trouble Man. He said he was deciding between the Cee Lo Green featured "Hello" or "Can You Learn" with R. Kelly. He also stated the tracks "Guns and Roses" with American singer-songwriter Pink and "Hallelujah" would have music videos released in the near future, with the former set to be released as a single. "Hello" featuring Cee-Lo Green was released to iTunes on December 11, 2012, as the fifth official single. According to T.I., the Cee Lo Green-featured song was selected due to its heavy radio play. In March he also revealed he would soon be filming the music video for "Hello". On March 19, 2013, T.I. performed "Hello" on Jimmy Kimmel Live!.

=== Promotional singles ===
"We Don't Get Down Like Y'all", which features guest vocals from Grand Hustle recording artist B.o.B, was released to iTunes as a promotional single on August 9, 2011, while T.I. was still incarcerated. The album's second promotional single, released on October 4, 2011, from T.I. was "I'm Flexin'", which features its guest vocals and production from Mississippi-based rapper-producer Big K.R.I.T. It was the first song to be released from T.I. after his 11-month prison sentence, and reached number 66 on the US Billboard Hot 100. The third promotional single to not make the album, "Here Ye, Hear Ye" featuring The Neptunes' Pharrell Williams under the alias Sk8brd, was released to iTunes on October 20, 2011. These three songs all failed to appear on the final track listing.

=== Other songs ===
Upon the release of Trouble Man: Heavy Is the Head, three songs from the album charted on various charts. "G Season" featuring Meek Mill debuted at number 22 on the US Billboard Bubbling Under Hot 100 Singles. While the song "Wildside" featuring ASAP Rocky debuted at number 5 on the Billboard Bubbling Under R&B/Hip-Hop Singles. As it announced to be one of the possible future single "Guns and Roses" featuring P!nk debuted at number 8 on the Billboard Bubbling Under R&B/Hip-Hop Singles. In Australia, the song debuted at number 24 and peaked at number 15 on the Australian ARIA singles chart, due to strong digital downloads. The song has been certified platinum by the Australian Recording Industry Association (ARIA) for shipments of 70,000 copies.

== Critical reception ==
Professional ratings
Review scores
Source	Rating
AllMusic	3/5 stars
Consequence of Sound	3.5/5 stars
Los Angeles Times	2/4 stars
Rolling Stone	3/5 stars
Slant Magazine	2.5/5 stars
Spin	7/10
USA Today	3/4 stars
XXL	(XL)

Trouble Man: Heavy Is the Head received generally positive reviews from music critics. At Metacritic, which assigns a normalized rating out of 100 to reviews from mainstream critics, the album received an average score of 64, based on 16 reviews, which indicates "generally favorable reviews". Despite criticizing T.I.'s "half-hearted stabs at Hot 100 success", Patrick Bowman of Idolator commended Trouble Man: Heavy Is the Head for showing "flashes of brilliance amidst brief instances of lingering stagnation", as well as noting the album to mark an important stage in T.I.'s career. William E. Ketchum III of HipHopDX observed T.I.'s "vitriolic, multisyllabic snarl [to be] still intact" and that he "sounds[...] as comfortable spitting the trap rap that earned him his reputation" on his earlier albums, although he felt that in some instances, T.I. "takes hit-making formulaic approaches to songs that he would have uniquely bodied during his peak points". Andy Kellman of AllMusic rated the album 3 out of 5, saying "This is a step forward from the MC's previous effort, but it's been six years since the he has made an album that must be heard." XXL named it one of the top five hip hop albums of 2012.

== Commercial performance ==
The album debuted at number two on the Billboard 200, with first-week sales of 179,000 copies in the United States. As of August 27, 2013, it has sold 501,000 copies. On September 2, 2013 XXL reported that Trouble Man: Heavy Is the Head had sold over 500,000 copies. The album was certified gold by the RIAA on November 7, 2013.

== Track listing ==
No.	Title	Writer(s)	Producer(s)	Length
1.	"The Introduction"	Clifford Harris, Jr.; Tommy Brown; Marvin Gaye; Lajuan Kinnemore; Travis Sayles; Aldrin Davis	K-Trak	3:53
2.	"G Season" (featuring Meek Mill)	Harris, Jr.; Robert Williams; Carl McCormick; Kenneth Gamble; Leon Huff; Gene McFadden; Paul Tisdale; John Whitehead	Cardiak; Chinky P	3:57
3.	"Trap Back Jumpin"	Harris, Jr.; Davis	DJ Toomp	5:04
4.	"Wildside" (featuring ASAP Rocky)	Harris, Jr.; Rakim Mayers; Dion Wilson; Brian Kidd	No I.D.; Kidd	5:28
5.	"Ball" (featuring Lil Wayne)	Harris, Jr.; Dwayne Carter, Jr.; Richard Butler, Jr.; Earl Hood; Eric Goudy II; Orville Hall; Phillip Price	Rico Love; Earl & E	3:25
6.	"Sorry" (featuring André 3000)	Harris, Jr.; André Benjamin; Phalon Alexander; Stacy Barthe; Derel "Sir Clef" Haynes; Aldric "Po" Johns	Jazze Pha; Sir Clef; Po Johns	5:48
7.	"Can You Learn" (featuring R. Kelly)	Harris, Jr.; Fredrick Hall; Willie Hutch; William "Mr. Jonz" Jones; Robert Kelly; Montay Humphrey; Korey Robertson	DJ Montay; Jamezz Bonn (add.); Mr. Jonz (add.)	6:12
8.	"Go Get It"	Harris, Jr.; Tyler Williams; Nikhil Seetharam	T-Minus	3:37
9.	"Guns and Roses" (featuring P!nk)	Harris, Jr.; Alecia Moore; T. Williams; Seetharam; Jacob Kasher Hindlin; Kelly Sheehan	T-Minus; Seetharam (co.)	4:28
10.	"The Way We Ride"	Harris, Jr.; Larrance Dopson; Lamar Edwards; John Groover; Michael Cox, Jr.	1500 or Nothin'; The Futuristiks	4:03
11.	"Cruisin’"	Harris, Jr.; Cordale Quinn	Lil' C	3:55
12.	"Addresses"	Harris, Jr.; T. Williams	T-Minus	3:09
13.	"Hello" (featuring Cee Lo Green)	Harris, Jr.; Pharrell Williams; Thomas Callaway	P. Williams	4:07
14.	"Who Want Some"	Harris, Jr.; Cedric L. Young; Davis; James Payne; James Glaser	DJ Toomp	5:55
15.	"Wonderful Life" (featuring Akon)	Harris, Jr.; Marquinarius Holmes; Elton John; Bernie Taupin; Aliaune Thiam	Sanchez Holmes	5:21
16.	"Hallelujah"	Harris, Jr.; Jevon Hill; Michael Render; Timothy Thomas; Theron Thomas; The Co-Captains	Planet VI; The Co-Captains	3:24
Total length:				71:45

Deluxe edition bonus tracks
No.	Title	Writer(s)	Producer(s)	Length
17.	"Love This Life"	Harris, Jr.; Edwards; Dopson	1500 or Nothin'	3:54
18.	"Like That"	Harris, Jr.; Quinn; Edwards	Lil' C; Mars	4:09
Total length:				79:49

Best Buy bonus tracks
No.	Title	Writer(s)	Producer(s)	Length
17.	"Live on Tonight" (featuring Victoria Monet)	Harris, Jr.; Brown; Sayles	Brown; Sayles	3:39
18.	"Parlay" (featuring D.O.P.E.)	Harris, Jr.; Charles Spencer	Chuck Deisel	4:13
19.	"Check This, Dig That" (featuring Trae tha Truth)	Harris, Jr.; Holmes; Fraizer Thompson	Holmes	4:45

Notes

- (co.) Co-producer
- (add.) Additional production
- "Hallelujah" features additional vocals performed by Netta Brielle

Sample credits

- "The Introduction" contains a sample of "Trouble Man" performed by Marvin Gaye.
- "Ball" contains a sample of "Drag Rap" performed by The Showboys.
- "G Season" contains a sample of "Shiftless, Shady, Jealous Kind of People" performed by The O'Jays.
- "Can You Learn" contains a sample of "I Choose You" performed by Willie Hutch.
- "Wonderful Life" contains a sample of "Your Song" performed by Elton John.
- "Hallelujah" contains a sample of "Hallelujah" performed by Leonard Cohen.

== Personnel ==
Credits for Trouble Man: Heavy Is the Head adapted from AllMusic.

- Kory Aaron – assistant
- Akon – featured artist
- André 3000 – featured artist
- ASAP Rocky – featured artist
- Diego Avendaño – assistant
- Stacy Barthe – primary artist
- Jamezz Bonn – additional production
- Leslie Brathwaite – mixing
- Netta Brielle – hook
- Tommy Brown – producer
- Nathan Burgess – assistant
- Greg Gigendad Burke – art direction, design
- Cardiak – producer
- Elliot Carter – engineer, vocal engineer
- Chinky P – producer
- Clef – producer
- Andrew Coleman – arranger, digital editing, engineer
- Alex Dilliplane – mixing assistant
- DJ Montay – drum programming, engineer, producer
- DJ Toomp – keyboards, producer, vocal engineer
- Lamar Edwards – producer
- The Futuristiks – producer
- Chris Gehringer – mastering
- Jason Geter – executive producer, management
- Casey Giannola – assistant
- Eric Goudy II – keyboards, programming
- Cee Lo Green – featured artist
- Dionnee Harper – marketing
- Trehy Harris – assistant
- Jevon Hill – producer
- Earl Hood – keyboards, programming
- Matt Huber – assistant
- Jaycen Joshua – mixing
- Jazze Pha – producer
- Po Johns – producer
- Matt Jones – photography
- K Tracks – producer
- Keke – production coordination
- R. Kelly – featured artist
- Brian Kidd – producer
- Mike Larson – arranger, digital editing
- Lil' C – producer
- Lil Wayne – featured artist
- Rico Love – producer, background vocals
- Fabian Marasciullo – mixing
- Robert Marks – mixing
- Tristan McClain – engineer
- Thurston McCrea – engineer
- PJ McGinnis – assistant
- Meek Mill – featured artist
- Mr. Jonz – additional production
- No I.D. – producer
- Ken Oriole – engineer
- Pharrell – producer
- P!nk – featured artist
- José Quintero – assistant
- Gee Roberson – executive producer
- Rock City – producer
- Sanchez – producer
- Travis Sayles – producer
- Miguel Scott – assistant
- Ray Seay – mixing
- Nikhil Seetharam – producer
- Bill Sienkiewicz – illustrations
- Elliot Stroud – engineer
- T.I. – primary artist
- T.I.P. – executive producer
- T-Minus – engineer, producer
- Carolyn Tracey – package production
- John X. Volaitis – assistant
- Miles Walker – mixing

== Charts ==
=== Weekly charts ===
Weekly chart performance for Trouble Man: Heavy Is the Head
Chart (2012)	Peak position
Belgian Albums (Ultratop Wallonia)	197
Japanese Albums (Oricon)	93
UK Albums (OCC)	188
US Billboard 200	2
US Top R&B/Hip-Hop Albums (Billboard)	1
US Top Rap Albums (Billboard)	1

=== Year-end charts ===
Year-end chart performance for Trouble Man: Heavy Is the Head
Chart (2013)	Position
US Billboard 200	50
US Top R&B/Hip-Hop Albums	14
US Top Rap Albums	9

== Certifications ==
Certifications for Trouble Man: Heavy Is the Head
Region	Certification	Certified units/sales
United States (RIAA)	Gold	500,000^{^}
^{^} Shipments figures based on certification alone.

== Release history ==
Trouble Man: Heavy Is the Head release history
Country	Date	Label	Format
France	December 17, 2012	Atlantic Records	CD
Canada	December 18, 2012	Atlantic Records	CD
United States	December 18, 2012	Atlantic Records	CD, digital download
Australia	December 19, 2012	Atlantic Records	CD
Netherlands	December 20, 2012	Atlantic Records	CD
Germany	December 21, 2012	Warner Music Group	CD
United Kingdom	December 24, 2012	Warner Music Group	CD
Sweden	December 26, 2012	Atlantic	CD

== See also ==
- List of number-one R&B albums of 2013 (U.S.)
- List of number-one rap albums of 2013 (U.S.)
