= Sorry (T.I. song) =

Single by T.I. featuring André 3000

from the album Trouble Man: Heavy Is the Head
- Released: November 27, 2012
- Recorded: 2012
- Genre: Hip hop
- Length: 5:48
- Label: Grand Hustle; Atlantic
- Songwriters: Clifford Harris, Jr.; André Benjamin; Phalon Alexander; Stacy Barthe; Derel Haynes; Aldric Johns
- Producers: Jazze Pha; Sir Clef; Po Johns

T.I. singles chronology
"Trap Back Jumpin" (2012)	"Sorry" (2012)	"We Still in This Bitch" (2013)

André 3000 singles chronology
"DoYaThing" (2012)	"Sorry" (2012)	"The Ends" (2016)

"Sorry" is a song by American hip hop recording artist T.I. The song was released on November 27, 2012, as the fourth official single from his eighth studio album Trouble Man: Heavy Is the Head (2012). The single, which was produced by American record producer Jazze Pha, features a guest verse from fellow Atlanta-based rapper André 3000, of Southern hip hop group OutKast. The track also features uncredited vocals by Stacy Barthe.

== Background ==
On November 19, 2012, T.I. announced the next two singles for the album would be "Sorry", featuring André 3000, followed by "Hello" featuring vocals from Cee Lo Green and production from Pharrell. "Sorry" was released as a single via iTunes on November 27, 2012. "Sorry" subsequently debuted at #36 on the Hot R&B/Hip-Hop Songs. On January 2, 2013 Andre 3000's Outkast cohort, Big Boi, took to his Twitter account to reveal he would be adding a verse to "Sorry", the song in which 3000 apologizes to him for past mistakes. T.I. had always wanted to work with Andre 3000; in an interview T.I. revealed the collaboration had finally come into fruition: “I got a record with 3000,” he told DJ Whoo Kid on Shade 45. “That’s a proud moment for me.”

== Charts ==
Chart (2012–2013)	Peak position
US Bubbling Under Hot 100 (Billboard)	16
US Hot R&B/Hip-Hop Songs (Billboard)	36
US Hot Rap Songs (Billboard)	14

== Release history ==
Country	Date	Format	Label
United States	November 20, 2013	Digital download	Grand Hustle, Atlantic
