= Ball (song) =

Single by T.I. featuring Lil Wayne

from the album Trouble Man: Heavy Is the Head
- Released: October 16, 2012
- Recorded: 2012
- Genre: Southern hip hop; bounce
- Length: 3:25
- Label: Grand Hustle; Atlantic
- Songwriters: Clifford Harris; Dwayne Carter; Richard Butler; Earl Hood; Eric Goudy II
- Producers: Rico Love; Earl & E

T.I. singles chronology
"Go Get It" (2012)	"Ball" (2012)	"Trap Back Jumpin" (2012)

Lil Wayne singles chronology
"Bandz a Make Her Dance" (2012)	"Ball" (2012)	"She Don't Put It Down" (2012)

Music video
- "Ball" on YouTube

"Ball" is a song by American rapper T.I., released on October 16, 2012, as the second official single from his eighth studio album Trouble Man: Heavy Is the Head (2012). The song features a guest appearance from fellow American rapper Lil Wayne, as well as production and uncredited vocals from American record producer Rico Love. In 2013, the song was included on the soundtrack to the film Fast & Furious 6.

== Background ==
The single, a New Orleans bounce record, was first announced by the song's producer Rico Love, who already had high hopes for the song, stating: "I'm not trying to be cocky, but I pretty much know that that's gonna be a hit record". T.I. unveiled the single's original artwork on June 29, 2012, which was later changed on October 8, 2012, along with the announcement of the single's release date. The song was previewed in the second season of his reality television series T.I. and Tiny: The Family Hustle on episode 5. The episode premiered on September 25, 2012, featuring the preview of it at a listening session in Chicago. The song was released on October 15, 2012, via T.I.'s YouTube channel managed by Atlantic Records, and was available for purchase at iTunes Store on October 16, 2012. Rico Love sampled "Drag Rap", as performed by The Showboys, to produce the song.

== Music video ==
T.I. shot a video for the song at Hollygrove in New Orleans, featuring cameo appearances of Rico Love, Trae, Mack Maine, Birdman, T.I.'s sons as well as T.I. and Lil Wayne. The photos of it came out on September 25, 2012, via his series #TroubleManTuesdays. The video of behind the scenes was released, on September 28, 2012, and the trailer for it came out on October 16, 2012 - same day it was released on iTunes. The music video premiered on VH1 Right after T.I.'s show T.I. and Tiny: The Family Hustle. The video was directed by Marc Klasfeld.

== Track listing ==
Digital download

1. "Ball" — 3:25

== Credits and personnel ==
- Production – Rico Love, Earl & E

Music Video Director: Marc Klasfeld Production Company: Rockhard Motion Studio: Super77 Producer: Rainer Ziehm Project Coordinator: Sara Santillan Creative Director: Nate Reese, Sean Conner Animation: Nate Reese, Chris Meister, Andrew Mark, Scott Ulliman, Chavilah Bennett

== Charts ==
=== Weekly charts ===
Chart (2012–2013)	Peak position
Canada Hot 100 (Billboard)	58
US Billboard Hot 100	50
US Hot R&B/Hip-Hop Songs (Billboard)	11
US Rhythmic Airplay (Billboard)	18

=== Year-end charts ===
Chart (2013)	Position
US Hot R&B/Hip-Hop Songs (Billboard)	57
US Hot Rap Songs (Billboard)	39

== Certifications ==
Region	Certification	Certified units/sales
United States (RIAA)	Platinum	1,000,000^{‡}
^{‡} Sales+streaming figures based on certification alone.

== Release history ==
Country	Date	Format	Label
Canada	October 16, 2012	Digital download	Grand Hustle, Atlantic
United States	October 16, 2012	Digital download	Grand Hustle, Atlantic
