= Love This Life =

Single by T.I.

from the album Trouble Man: Heavy is the Head (Deluxe edition)
- Released: April 3, 2012
- Recorded: 2012
- Genre: Hip hop
- Length: 3:54
- Label: Grand Hustle; Atlantic
- Songwriters: Clifford Harris; Lamar Edwards; Larrance Dopson
- Producer: 1500 or Nothin'

T.I. singles chronology
"We in This Bitch" (2012)	"Love This Life" (2012)	"Back 2 Life (Live It Up)" (2012)

Music video
- "Love This Life" on YouTube

"Love This Life" is a song by the American hip hop recording artist T.I., released on April 3, 2012, as the intended first single from his eighth studio album, Trouble Man: Heavy is the Head (2012). The song was produced by production team 1500 or Nothin', and was eventually included on the album as an iTunes bonus track. Certain critics noted its thematic similarity to his previous 2008 single, "Whatever You Like", although many deemed it inferior, and some characterized it as misogynistic.

== Music video ==
The music video was premiered on June 14, 2012, on 106 & Park. The video was shot in Sydney, Australia.

== Composition ==
The hip hop song's hook contains 'layered' singing vocals by T.I., very similar to "That's All She Wrote", a previous single released by T.I. featuring fellow rapper Eminem, also known for often using layered singing vocals. T.I. told XXL that the song speaks to women, "but from a man’s perspective". He described the song's concept saying, "People who find themselves in a situation where the woman might say she wants to part ways with the man, but the man [is] like, 'Let’s be sensible about this. You gonna leave all this? And go where?'" While T.I. incorporates references to cars, shoes and jewelry, he also expresses the desire to have an understanding relationship.

== Critical reception ==
Markman compared T.I.'s delivery to that on "Whatever You Like", only "much darker". Trent Fitzgerald of PopCrush called it "a great rap ballad that could make the toughest neighborhood thug want to buy candy and flowers for his girlfriend."

== Charts ==
Chart (2012)	Peak position
US Billboard Hot 100	81
US Hot R&B/Hip-Hop Songs (Billboard)	39

== Release history ==
Country	Date	Format	Label
United States	April 3, 2012	Digital download	Grand Hustle, Atlantic
