= Remember Me (T.I. song) =

Single by T.I. featuring Mary J. Blige

from the album Paper Trail: Case Closed
- Released: July 7, 2009
- Length: 4:05
- Label: Grand Hustle; Atlantic
- Songwriters: Esther Dean; Clifford Harris; Jamal Jones; Jason Perry
- Producers: Polow Da Don; Jason Perry

T.I. singles chronology
"Day Dreaming" (2009)	"Remember Me" (2009)	"Hell of a Life" (2009)

Mary J. Blige singles chronology
"IfULeave" (2008)	"Remember Me" (2009)	"The One" (2009)

"Remember Me" is a song by American hip-hop rapper T.I., featuring vocals from American R&B singer Mary J. Blige. The song was released as the first single from the re-release of T.I.'s sixth studio album, Paper Trail; which was ultimately released as an extended play (EP).

== Background ==
In the UK, the song was released as a single and was taken from an EP, entitled Paper Trail: Case Closed. It features Mary J. Blige. The song was officially released to urban radio the week of July 7, 2009. The main message of the song is remembrance. Its original title was "Don't Forget". The song is about T.I.'s jail sentence and how he wants people to remember him as he is not going to be gone forever, including the verse "By the time you hear this, I'd be half way home". It also talks about the hard times in his life and how he does not give up. In the song, T.I. mentions Martin Luther King Jr. and Malcolm X and alludes to how he is possibly the modern day version of them. With no promotion, the single sold over 80,000 downloads in its first week, and it debuted at number 29 on the Billboard Hot 100 chart.

== Music video ==
The video was directed by Jessy Terrero, and follows on from the themes of the song, showing prisoners being forgotten by their significant others while incarcerated. A trailer was posted on June 15, 2009, and the full video was released on July 13, 2009, and it was later released on iTunes on July 28. The beginning of the video starts where "Dead and Gone" left off, with T.I. being led to a prison cell to begin a sentence. T.I. then appears inside of his house, but he cannot be seen by anyone else. He finds his wife and another man celebrating after finding out T.I. was going to prison. Two other prisoners are featured in similar scenarios, where they appear outside of their homes but cannot be seen. One inmate sees his girlfriend cheating on him in front of his daughter, and another sees his girlfriend throw a letter he wrote to her in a trash can. The video ends with T.I. being released from prison.

== Charts ==
Chart (2009)	Peak position
Canada Hot 100 (Billboard)	21
Ireland (IRMA)	19
UK Singles (Official Charts)	34
US Billboard Hot 100	29
US Hot R&B/Hip-Hop Songs (Billboard)	42
