= I'm Flexin' =

Single by T.I. featuring Big K.R.I.T.

from the album Trouble Man: Heavy is the Head (intended)
- Released: October 4, 2011
- Recorded: 2011
- Genre: Hip hop
- Label: Grand Hustle; Atlantic
- Songwriters: Clifford Harris; Justin Scott
- Producer: Big K.R.I.T.

T.I. singles chronology
"We Don't Get Down Like Y'all" (2011)	"I'm Flexin'" (2011)	"F.A.M.E." (2011)

Big K.R.I.T. singles chronology
"Country Shit (Remix)" (2011)	"I'm Flexin'" (2011)	"What U Mean" (2012)

Music video
- "I'm Flexin'" on YouTube

"I'm Flexin'" is a song by American hip hop recording artist T.I., featuring vocals and production from fellow Southern rapper Big K.R.I.T. It was officially released on October 4, 2011, as a buzz single for his eighth studio album Trouble Man: Heavy is the Head (2012). The song's release indicated T.I.'s return to the music business, following his 11-month prison sentence.

== Background ==
Since his release from incarceration, T.I. has appeared on and remixed songs from the likes of Future, 2 Chainz, Drake, Lil Wayne and Young Jeezy. "I'm Flexin'" serves as his first release as a lead artist, since his release from a half-way home on September 29, 2011. On September 23, 2011, XXL announced that DJ Drama revealed T.I. was planning on releasing a song-his first since going back to federal prison last November for a probation violation, on Monday, September 26, both produced and featuring Big K.R.I.T. The song's release was delayed, but later leaked on September 30, 2011. It was officially released to digital retailers, like iTunes and Amazon on October 4, 2011.

== Music video ==
On October 22, 2011, a behind-the-scenes video was released. It was directed by T.I.'s frequent collaborators Motion Family and was filmed in T.I.'s old neighborhood, Cedar Avenue, in his hometown of Atlanta, Georgia. As of April 2021 the video has over 10 million views.

== Chart performance ==
The song first charted on the week of October 10, 2011 on the Hot R&B/Hip-Hop Songs at number sixty-eight. After six weeks on that chart it peaked at number thirty-two, falling to number thirty-seven the following week.

=== Chart positions ===
Chart (2011)	Peak position
US Billboard Hot 100	66
US Hot R&B/Hip-Hop Songs (Billboard)	32
US Hot Rap Songs (Billboard)	23

== Release Information ==
=== Purchasable Release ===
Country	Date	Format	Label	Ref
United States	October 4, 2011	Digital download	Grand Hustle	
