= Trap Back Jumpin =

Single by T.I.

from the album Trouble Man: Heavy Is the Head
- Released: November 13, 2012
- Recorded: 2012
- Genre: Hardcore hip hop; Southern hip hop; trap
- Length: 5:04
- Label: Grand Hustle; Atlantic
- Songwriters: Harris Jr.; Aldrin Davis
- Producer: DJ Toomp

T.I. singles chronology
| "Ball" (2012) | "Trap Back Jumpin" (2012) | "Sorry" (2012) |

Music video
- "Trap Back Jumpin" on YouTube

"Trap Back Jumpin" is a song by American rapper T.I. It was released November 13, 2012 as the third official single from his eighth studio album Trouble Man: Heavy Is the Head (2012).

== Release ==
The song was leaked on September 14, 2012 before T.I. performed it at the BET Hip Hop Awards. The single was available for digital download on November 13, 2012.

== Music video ==
The music video was directed by Clifton Bell and was released on December 11, 2012.

== Charts ==
| Chart (2012) | Peak position |
|---|---|
| US Hot R&B/Hip-Hop Songs (Billboard) | 38 |
