= We Don't Get Down Like Y'all =

2011 single by T.I. featuring B.o.B

Single by T.I. featuring B.o.B
- Released: June 29, 2011
- Length: 3:42
- Label: Grand Hustle; Atlantic
- Songwriter(s): Clifford Harris; Bobby Simmons Jr.; Andrew Harr; Jermaine Jackson; Kevin Cossom
- Producer(s): The Runners

T.I. singles chronology
"Ready Set Go (Remix)" (2011)	"We Don't Get Down Like Y'all" (2011)	"I'm Flexin'" (2011)

B.o.B singles chronology
"I'll Be in the Sky" (2011)	"We Don't Get Down Like Y'all" (2011)	"Strange Clouds" (2011)

"We Don't Get Down Like Y'all" is a single by American rapper T.I. featuring American rapper B.o.B. It was released on June 29, 2011 and produced by The Runners.

== Critical reception ==
The song was well-received by music critics. Rap-Up's Devin wrote, "The rap titans distance themselves from their competitors with slick-talking rhymes". DJ Ill Will of HotNewHipHop wrote, "T.I. continues to impress with each new leak, and We Don't Get Down Like Yall is no exception. It's [sic] strengthens T.I.'s already impressive body of work, which has seen positive change over the years." Complex's Matt Cole stated, "T.I. proves he's still got it while B.o.B delivers another simple-but-catchy hook." Chris Coplan of Consequence of Sound wrote of the song, "Even without that awesome jailhouse vibe to it, it's your standard Tip banger that boasts his superiority on the mic." Earmilk's Montrey Whittaker remarked the song "goes hard and takes no prisoners" and "It starts off hype and never let's [sic] up with finishes with zero apologies." Sam Hockley-Smith of The Fader commented that T.I. "raps his ass off" in the song. Hypebeast's Matt Morris commented the song "may be a good listen for fans who are awaiting both artists to return onto the new music circuit later this year."

== Charts ==
Chart (2011)	Peak position
US Billboard Hot 100	78
