= Go Get It =

Single by T.I.

from the album Trouble Man: Heavy Is the Head
- Released: July 17, 2012
- Recorded: 2012
- Genre: Hip hop; gangsta rap
- Length: 3:37
- Label: Grand Hustle; Atlantic
- Songwriters: Clifford Harris; Nikhil S.; Tyler Williams
- Producer: T-Minus

T.I. singles chronology
"2 Reasons" (2012)	"Go Get It" (2012)	"Ball" (2012)

Music video
- "Go Get It" on YouTube

"Go Get It" is a song by American hip hop recording artist T.I., released July 17, 2012, as the first single from his eighth studio album Trouble Man: Heavy Is the Head (2012). The song was produced by Canadian hip hop and R&B producer T-Minus, who T.I. previously collaborated with on "Poppin Bottles", featuring Drake, from his seventh studio album No Mercy (2010). Before its official release, the song had leaked online earlier in June. This song is featured on EA Sports UFC 2.

== Music video ==
Before the video's release, the rapper uploaded a teaser video, followed by a behind-the-scenes video. The music video, directed by Alex Nazari, was released on August 16, 2012 via his YouTube account. As of June 2023, the video has over 90 million views.

== Track listing ==
Digital download

1. "Go Get It" — 3:37

== Credits and personnel ==
- Songwriter – C. Harris, Nikhil Seetharam, T. Williams
- Production – T-Minus

== Charts ==
Chart (2012)	Peak position
Canada Hot 100 (Billboard)	86
US Billboard Hot 100	77
US Hot R&B/Hip-Hop Songs (Billboard)	40
US Hot Rap Songs (Billboard)	23

== Radio and release history ==
Country	Date	Format	Label
Canada	July 17, 2012	Digital download	Grand Hustle, Atlantic
United States	July 17, 2012	Digital download	Grand Hustle, Atlantic
