= Hell of a Life (T.I. song) =

Single by T.I.

from the album Paper Trail: Case Closed
- Released: October 6, 2009
- Genre: Hip hop
- Length: 4:17 (single version)
- Label: Grand Hustle; Atlantic
- Songwriters: Clifford Harris; Nate Hills; Iommi; Osbourne; Butler; Ward
- Producers: Danja; Jim Jonsin (co.)

T.I. singles chronology
"Remember Me" (2009)	"Hell of a Life" (2009)	"I'm Back" (2010)

"Hell of a Life" is a song by American hip hop recording artist T.I., released as a single on October 6, 2009. The song serves as the second single from the re-release of his 2008 album, Paper Trail: Case Closed, which was ultimately released as an extended play (EP). The song contains a sample of "Avulekile Amasango" as performed by Ishmael.

== Music video ==
The music video for the song was released on October 5, 2009 through Trap Muzik. The music video reflects T.I.'s career and narrates the final 24 hours before beginning his prison sentence for illegal weapons.

== Track listing ==
Digital single

No.	Title	Writer(s)	Producer(s)	Length
1.	"Hell of a Life" (single version)	Clifford Harris, Nate Hills, Iommi, Osbourne, Butler, Ward	Danja, co-produced by Jim Jonsin	4:17

== Chart positions ==
Chart (2009)	Peak position
Canada Hot 100 (Billboard)	43
US Billboard Hot 100	54
US Hot R&B/Hip-Hop Songs (Billboard)	71
