= List of awards and nominations received by T.I. =

List of T.I.'s awards
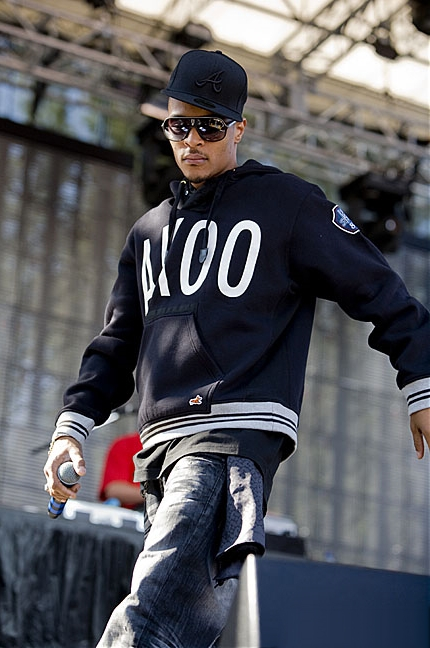
- T.I. performing at the 2009 Bumbershoot festival
Award	Wins	Nominations
American Music Awards	2	9
ASCAP Pop Awards	8	0
ASCAP R&B/Soul Awards	8	0
BET Awards	4	12
BET Hip Hop Awards	9	30
Billboard Music Awards	12	20
Billboard Hip Hop/R&B Awards	1	4
BMI Awards	9	0
Grammy Awards	3	22
MOBO Awards	0	1
MTV Video Music Awards	1	9
MTV Australia Awards	1	1
MTV Europe Music Awards	0	4
MTV Video Music Awards Japan	0	4
MuchMusic Video Awards	0	1
Ozone Awards	2	10
People's Choice Awards	0	3
Soul Train Music Awards	2	5
Source Awards	1	5
Southern Entertainment Awards	2	3
Teen Choice Awards	0	11
Urban Music Awards	0	2
Vibe Awards	2	9
World Music Awards	0	11
- Totals
Awards won	65
Nominations	170

T.I. is an American rapper, producer, actor, and the co-CEO of Grand Hustle Records. He won his first award in 2003 when he received Best Collaboration with fellow hip hop artist Bone Crusher for the song "Never Scared" at the Source Awards. In 2004, he received two wins from six nominations, including Best Street Anthem for "Rubberband Man" at the Vibe Awards. In 2005, he received one award from 13 nominations, that being his second consecutive Best Street Anthem award, this time for the song "U Don't Know Me"

T.I. received 18 wins from 37 nominations in 2006, including Male Hip Hop Artist of the Year at the Black Entertainment Television (BET) Awards, Hip Hop MVP of the Year at the BET Hip Hop Awards, Rap Artist of the Year at the Billboard Music Awards, Best Rap Artist at the Ozone Awards. For the entire year of 2007, T.I. received 16 wins from 41 nominations, including his first two Grammy wins at the 49th Annual Grammy Awards, one for the single "What You Know" (Best Rap Solo Performance) and one for American pop singer Justin Timberlake's number-one single "My Love" (Best Rap/Sung Collaboration), Favorite Male Hip Hop Artist and Favorite Rap/Hip Hop album for T.I. vs. T.I.P. at the American Music Awards, Best Hip Hop Male at the BET Awards for the second consecutive year, and Rap Artist of the Year at the Billboard Music Awards.

In 2008, T.I. received two wins from 11 nominations, including Most Performed Song for "My Love" at the ASCAP Pop Music Awards. In 2009, T.I. received 11 wins from 31 nominations, including Top R&B/Hip Hop Male Artist of the Decade at The Billboard Music Awards, Best Rap Performance by a Duo or Group for "Swagga Like Us" at the 51st Annual Grammy Awards, and Best Male Video for "Live Your Life" at the MTV Video Music Awards. Overall, T.I. has earned 64 awards from 170 nominations.

== American Music Awards ==
The American Music Awards are awarded for outstanding achievements for American artists in the record industry. T.I. has won two awards from nine nominations.

Year	Nominee / work	Award	Result
2005	Urban Legend	Favorite Rap/Hip Hop Album	Nominated
2006	T.I.	Favorite Rap/Hip Male Artist	Nominated
2006	KING	Favorite Rap/Hip Hop Album	Nominated
2007	T.I.	Favorite Rap/Hip Hop Male Artist	Won
2007	T.I. vs. T.I.P.	Favorite Rap/Hip Hop Album	Won
2009	Paper Trail	Favorite Album for Rap/Hip Hop	Nominated
2009	T.I.	Favorite Rap/Hip Hop Artist	Nominated
2009	T.I.	Favorite Rock/Pop Artist	Nominated
2013	"Blurred Lines" (with Robin Thicke and Pharrell Williams)	Single of the Year	Nominated

== ASCAP Music Awards ==
The ASCAP Awards are held annually by the American Society of Composers, Authors and Publishers.

=== ASCAP Pop Music Awards ===
The annual ASCAP Pop Music Awards honors the songwriters and publishers of the most performed pop songs. T.I. has won five awards.

Year	Nominee / work	Award	Result
2006	"Soldier"	Most Performed Song	Won
2007	"Grillz" "My Love" "What You Know"	Most Performed Songs	Won
2008	"My Love"	Most Performed Song	Won
2009	"Live Your Life"	Most Performed Song	Won
2010	"Dead and Gone" "Live Your Life"	Most Performed Song	Won

=== ASCAP Rhythm & Soul Music Awards ===
The annual ASCAP Rhythm & Soul Music Awards honors songwriters and publishers of top R&B, hip hop, and reggae music. T.I. has won eight awards.

Year	Nominee / work	Award	Result
2006	"Soldier" "Bring Em Out" "U Don't Know Me"	Top Hip Hop/R&B song	Won
2006	"Bring Em Out" "U Don't Know Me"	Top Rap Song	Won
2007	"What You Know" "Why You Wanna" "Grillz"	Top Hip Hop/R&B song	Won
2007	"Grillz" "What You Know" "Why You Wanna"	Top Rap Song	Won
2008	"My Love"	Top Hip Hop/R&B song	Won
2010	"Dead and Gone" "Just Like Me" "Live Your Life"	Award Winning Hip Hop/R&B song	Won
2010	"Dead and Gone" "Live Your Life"	Award winning Rap Song	Won
2011	"Fancy"	Award Winning Hip Hop/R&B song	Won

== Barbados Music Awards ==
The Barbados Music Awards is an annual award ceremony that honors the best in Barbadian music. T.I. has received one nomination.

Year	Nominee / work	Award	Result
2009	"Live Your Life"	Best Collaboration	Nominated

== BET Awards ==
The BET Awards were established in 2001 by the Black Entertainment Television network to celebrate African Americans and other minorities in music, acting, sports, and other fields of entertainment. T.I. has won three awards from twelve nominations.

Year	Nominee / work	Award	Result
2005	"Soldier" (with Destiny's Child & Lil Wayne)	Best Collaboration	Nominated
2005	"Soldier" (with Destiny's Child & Lil Wayne)	Viewer's Choice	Nominated
2005	T.I.	Best Hip Hop Male	Nominated
2006	T.I.	Best Male Hip Hop Artist	Won
2006	"What You Know"	Viewer's Choice	Nominated
2007	T.I.	Best Male Hip Hop Artist	Won
2009	T.I.	Best Male Hip Hop Artist	Nominated
2009	"Live Your Life" (with Rihanna)	Viewer's Choice Award	Won
2009	"Live Your Life" (with Rihanna)	Video of the Year	Nominated
2009	"Live Your Life" (with Rihanna)	Best Collaboration	Nominated
2009	"Ain't I" (with Yung L.A. & Young Dro)	Best Collaboration	Nominated
2011	Takers	Best Movie	Nominated
2014	"Blurred Lines" (with Robin Thicke & Pharrell Williams)	Best Collaboration	Nominated
2026	"Headphones" (with Lecrae and Killer Mike)	Dr. Bobby Jones Best Gospel/Inspirational Award	Won

== BET Hip Hop Awards ==
The BET Hip Hop Awards are an annual awards show, hosted by BET, for hip hop performers, producers and music video directors. The awards ceremony debuted in 2006. T.I. has won nine awards from thirty nominations.

Year	Nominee / work	Award	Result
2006	T.I.	Best Live Performer	Nominated
2006	T.I.	Hip Hop MVP of the Year	Won
2006	T.I.	Element Award: Lyricist Of the Year	Nominated
2006	T.I.	Hustler of the Year	Nominated
2006	KING	Hip Hop Video CD of the Year	Won
2006	"Shoulder Lean"	Best Hip Hop Collabo of the Year	Nominated
2006	"Shoulder Lean"	BET Hot Ringtone Award	Won
2006	"What You Know"	Best Hip Hop Track of the Year	Won
2006	"What You Know"	Hip Hop Video of the Year	Nominated
2007	"We Takin' Over"	Attel's People Wireless Champ	Nominated
2007	T.I. vs. T.I.P.	Hip Hop CD of the Year (Tied with Common's Finding Forever)	Won
2007	"Big Things Poppin' (Do It)"	Hip Hop Video of the Year	Nominated
2007	"Big Things Poppin' (Do It)"	Hip Hop Track of the Year	Nominated
2007	"Big Things Poppin' (Do It)"	Best Ringtone	Won
2007	T.I.	Lyricist of the Year	Nominated
2007	T.I.	Best Live Performer	Nominated
2007	T.I.	Hustler of the Year	Nominated
2008	T.I.	Best Live Performer	Nominated
2008	T.I.	Best Lyricist	Nominated
2008	T.I.	Hip Hop MVP of the Year	Nominated
2009	T.I.	Best Live Performer	Nominated
2009	T.I.	Hip Hop MVP of the Year	Nominated
2009	Paper Trail	Hip Hop CD of the Year	Won
2009	"Live Your Life"	Track of the Year	Nominated
2009	"Live Your Life"	Hip Hop Collaboration	Won
2009	"Live Your Life"	Hip Hop Video of the Year	Won
2010	T.I.	Hustler of the Year	Nominated
2010	T.I.	Made You Look Award	Nominated
2010	"Hello Good Morning"	Best Club Banger	Nominated
2012	"Magic" (remix)	Sweet 16	Nominated
2013	T.I.	Hustler of the Year	Nominated
2014	T.I.	Best Live Performer	Nominated
2014	T.I.	Hustler of the Year	Nominated

== Billboard Awards ==
The Billboard Music Awards were sponsored by Billboard and was held annually in December. The awards were based on sales data by Nielsen SoundScan and radio information by Nielsen Broadcast Data Systems. T.I. has won twelve awards from twenty nominations.

Year	Nominee / work	Award	Result
2006	T.I.	Rap Artist of the Year	Won
2006	KING	Rap Album of the Year	Won
2006	T.I.	Rap Album Artist of the Year	Won
2006	T.I.	Rap Song Artist of the Year	Won
2006	T.I.	Video Clip Artist of the Year	Won
2006	T.I.	R&B/Hip Hop Artist of the Year	Nominated
2006	T.I.	R&B/Hip Hop Artist of the Year (Male)	Nominated
2006	KING	R&B/Hip Hop Album of the Year	Nominated
2007	T.I.	Rap Artist of the Year	Won
2007	T.I. vs. T.I.P.	Rap Album of the Year	Won
2007	T.I.	Rap Song Artist of the Year	Won
2007	T.I.	Video Clip Artist of the Year	Nominated
2007	T.I.	R&B/Hip Hop Artist of the Year	Nominated
2007	T.I.	R&B/Hip Hop Artist of the Year (Male)	Nominated
2007	T.I. vs. T.I.P.	Rap/Hip Hop Album of the Year	Nominated
2009	T.I.	Male Artist of the Decade	Nominated
2009	T.I.	Top R&B/Hip Hop Male Artist of the Decade	Won
2009	T.I.	Top Rap Song Artist of the Decade	Won
2009	T.I.	Top Hot Song Artist of the Year	Won
2013	Blurred Lines (as featured artist)	Top Hot 100 Song	Won

=== Billboard Hip Hop/R&B Awards ===
The Billboard R&B/Hip-Hop Awards reflect the performance of recordings on the Hot R&B/Hip-Hop Songs and Hot Rap Tracks. T.I. has won one award out of four nominations.

Year	Nominee / work	Award	Result
2006	T.I.	Best R&B/Hip Hop Artist Male	Nominated
2006	KING	Best Rap Album	Nominated
2007	T.I.	Best R&B/Hip Hop Artist Male	Nominated
2007	T.I. vs. T.I.P.	Best Rap Album	Won

== BMI Urban Awards ==
BMI is one of three United States performing rights organizations, along with ASCAP and SESAC. It collects license fees on behalf of songwriters, composers, and music publishers and distributes them as royalties to those members whose works have been performed. T.I. has won nine times.

Year	Nominee / work	Award	Result
2006	"What You Know" "Grillz"	2006 Billboard #1's	Won
2006	"Soldier"	Award Winning Songs	Won
2007	"Grillz" "Shoulder Lean" "My Love" "What You Know"	Award Winning Songs	Won
2007	"Grillz"	Award Winning Pop Songs	Won
2008	"I'm a Flirt"	Award Winning Songs	Won
2008	"My Love"	Award Winning Pop Songs	Won
2009	"Live Your Life" "Whatever You Like" "You Know What It Is"	Award Winning Songs	Won
2010	"Ain't I" "Dead and Gone" "Live Your Life"	Most Performed Urban Songs of the Year	Won
2010	"Dead and Gone" "Live Your Life" "Whatever You Like"	Award Winning Pop Songs	Won

== Grammy Awards ==
The Grammy Awards are awarded annually by the National Academy of Recording Arts and Sciences. T.I. has won three awards out of twenty-two nominations.

Year	Nominee / work	Award	Result
2006	"Soldier" (with Destiny's Child & Lil Wayne)	Best Rap/Sung Collaboration	Nominated
2006	"U Don't Know Me"	Best Rap Solo Performance	Nominated
2007	"What You Know"	Best Rap Solo Performance	Won
2007	"What You Know"	Best Rap Song	Nominated
2007	"My Love" (with Justin Timberlake)	Best Rap/Sung Collaboration	Won
2007	King	Best Rap Album	Nominated
2008	T.I. vs. T.I.P.	Best Rap Album	Nominated
2008	"Big Things Poppin' (Do It)"	Best Rap Solo Performance	Nominated
2008	"Big Things Poppin' (Do It)"	Best Rap Song	Nominated
2009	"Swagga Like Us" (with Jay-Z, Kanye West & Lil Wayne)	Best Rap Song	Nominated
2009	"Swagga Like Us" (with Jay-Z, Kanye West & Lil Wayne)	Best Rap Performance by a Duo or Group	Won
2009	"Wish You Would" (with Ludacris)	Best Rap Performance by a Duo or Group	Nominated
2009	Paper Trail	Best Rap Album	Nominated
2010	"Dead and Gone" (with Justin Timberlake)	Best Rap/Sung Collaboration	Nominated
2010	"Dead and Gone" (with Justin Timberlake)	Best Rap Song	Nominated
2011	"I'm Back"	Best Rap Solo Performance	Nominated
2011	"Fancy" (with Drake & Swizz Beatz)	Best Rap Performance by a Duo or Group	Nominated
2014	"Blurred Lines" (with Robin Thicke & Pharrell Williams)	Record of the Year	Nominated
2014	"Blurred Lines" (with Robin Thicke & Pharrell Williams)	Best Pop Duo/Group Performance	Nominated
2026	"Headphones" (with Lecrae & Killer Mike)	Best Contemporary Christian Music Performance/Song	Nominated
2027	"Let 'Em Know"	Best Rap Performance	Pending
2027	"Let 'Em Know"	Best Rap Song	Pending

== MOBO Awards, UK ==
The Music of Black Origin Awards, established in 1995 by Kanya King MBE and Andy Ruffell, are held annually in the United Kingdom to recognise artists of any race or nationality performing black music. T.I. was nominated once.

Year	Nominee / work	Award	Result
2007	T.I.	Best International Act	Nominated

== MTV Awards ==
=== VMA ===
The MTV Video Music Awards were established in 1984 by MTV to celebrate the top music videos of the year. T.I. has won one award out of nine nominations.

Year	Nominee / work	Award	Result
2005	"U Don't Know Me"	Best Rap Video	Nominated
2006	"What You Know"	Best Male Video	Nominated
2006	"What You Know"	Best Rap Video	Nominated
2007	T.I.	Male Artist of the Year	Nominated
2008	"No Matter What"	Best Male Video	Nominated
2009	"Live Your Life"	Best Male Video	Won
2013	"Blurred Lines"	Video of the Year	Nominated
2013	"Blurred Lines"	Best Male Video	Nominated
2013	"Blurred Lines"	Best Collaboration	Nominated

=== MTV Australia Awards ===
The MTV Australia Awards started in 2005 and is Australia's first awards show to celebrate both local and international acts. T.I. has won one award.

Year	Nominee / work	Award	Result
2009	"Live Your Life"	Best Collaboration	Won

=== EMA ===
The MTV Europe Music Awards were established in 1994 by MTV Europe to celebrate the most popular music videos in Europe. T.I. was nominated four times.

Year	Nominee / work	Award	Result
2009	T.I.	Best Urban	Nominated
2010	T.I.	Best Hip Hop	Nominated
2013	"Blurred Lines"	Best Song	Nominated
2013	"Blurred Lines"	Best Video	Nominated

=== MTV Video Music Awards Japan ===
The MTV Video Music Awards Japan started in 2002. T.I. was nominated four times.

Year	Nominee / work	Award	Result
2007	"What You Know"	Best Video	Nominated
2009	"Live Your Life"	Best Hip Hop Video	Nominated
2009	"Live Your Life"	Best Collaboration	Nominated
2013	"Back 2 Life (Live It Up)"	Best Reggae Video	Nominated

== MuchMusic Video Awards, CAN ==
The MuchMusic Video Awards is an annual awards ceremony presented by the Canadian music video channel MuchMusic. T.I. has been nominated once.

Year	Nominee / work	Award	Result
2009	"Live Your Life"	International Video (Artist)	Nominated

== NAACP Image Awards ==
An NAACP Image Award is an accolade presented by the American National Association for the Advancement of Colored People to honor outstanding people of color in film, television, music, and literature. T.I. was nominated twice.

Year	Nominee / work	Award	Result
2014	"Blurred Lines"	Outstanding Duo, Group or Collaboration	Won
2014	"Blurred Lines"	Outstanding Song	Nominated

== Ozone Awards ==
The first annual Ozone Awards were held on August 6, 2006. The awards were determined for great success in Southern Hip Hop. T.I. has won two awards out of ten nominations.

Year	Nominee / work	Award	Result
2006	KING	Best Rap Album	Won
2006	"What You Know"	Best Club Banger	Nominated
2006	T.I.	Best Rap Artist	Won
2006	T.I.	Best Lyricist	Nominated
2006	T.I.	TJ's DJ's Tastemaker Award	Nominated
2007	T.I.	TJ's DJ's Hustler Award	Nominated
2007	T.I.	Best Rap Artist (Male)	Nominated
2007	T.I.	TJ's DJ's Tastemaker Award	Nominated
2008	T.I.	Best Rap Artist	Nominated
2008	T.I.	Best Lyricist	Nominated

== People's Choice Awards ==
The People's Choice Awards is an annual awards show recognizing the people and the work of popular culture. T.I. was nominated 3 times.

Year	Nominee / work	Award	Result
2010	T.I.	Hip Hop Artist of the Year	Nominated
2010	"Live Your Life"	Favorite Music Collaboration	Nominated
2015	T.I.	Favorite Hip-Hop Artist	Nominated

== Soul Train Music Awards ==
The Soul Train Music Awards is an annual award show which previously aired in national television syndication, and honors the best in Black music and entertainment. T.I. has won two awards out of five nominations.

Year	Nominee / work	Award	Result
2010	"Got Your Back"	Best Hip Hop Song of the Year	Nominated
2013	"Blurred Lines"	Song of the Year	Won
2013	"Blurred Lines"	Best Dance Performance	Nominated
2013	"Blurred Lines"	Video of the Year	Nominated
2013	"Blurred Lines"	Best Collaboration	Won

== Source Awards ==
The first live Source Hip-Hop Music Awards show was held in 1994. T.I. has won one award from five nominations.

Year	Nominee / work	Award	Result
2003	"Never Scared"	Single of the Year Collaboration	Won
2004	T.I.	Breakthrough Artist of the Year	Nominated
2004	T.I.	Lyricist of the Year	Nominated
2004	"Rubberband Man (remix)"	Remix of the Year	Nominated
2004	"Round Here"	Single of the Year Collaboration	Nominated

== Southern Entertainment Award (SEA) ==
The Southern Entertainment Awards recognize those responsible for contributing to the growth of Southern Hip Hop. T.I. won two awards from three nominations.

Year	Nominee / work	Award	Result
2004	T.I.	Southern Mixtape Artist Of the Year	Won
2005	T.I.	Artist of the Year	Nominated
2009	Club Crucial	Nightclub/Venue of the Year	Won

== Stellar Awards ==
Year	Nominee / work	Award	Result
2026	"Headphones" (with Lecrae and Killer Mike)	Rap/Hip Hop Song of the Year	Pending

== Teen Choice Awards ==
The Teen Choice Awards is an awards show presented annually by the Fox Broadcasting Company. T.I. was nominated eleven times.

Year	Nominee / work	Award	Result
2005	"Bring Em Out"	Choice Rap Track	Nominated
2005	"Soldier"	Choice R&B/Rap Track	Nominated
2005	T.I.	Choice Breakout Artist	Nominated
2006	T.I.	Choice Rap Artist	Nominated
2006	T.I.	Choice Male Artist	Nominated
2007	T.I.	Rap Artist	Nominated
2007	T.I.	Choice Male Artist	Nominated
2009	"Live Your Life"	Hook Up Track	Nominated
2010	"Hello Good Morning"	Rap/Hip-Hop Track	Nominated
2013	"Blurred Lines"	Choice Summer Song	Nominated
2013	"Blurred Lines"	Choice Single: Male Artist	Nominated

== Urban Music Awards ==
The Urban Music Awards is a HipHop, R&B, Dance and soul music awards ceremony launched in 2003 and now held in six countries annually. T.I. was nominated two times.

Year	Nominee / work	Award	Result
2007	T.I.	Most Inspiring Act	Nominated
2007	T.I.	Best Hip Hop Act	Nominated

== Vibe Awards ==
The Vibe Awards are an annual award ceremony that honor hip hop, R&B and soul musicians. T.I. has won two awards from nine nominations.

Year	Nominee / work	Award	Result
2004	"Rubberband Man"	Best Street Anthem	Won
2005	"U Don't Know Me"	Best Street Anthem	Won
2005	T.I.	Best Rapper	Nominated
2005	"Bring Em Out"	Club Banger	Nominated
2005	"Soldier"	Coolest Collaboration	Nominated
2007	"We Takin' Over"	Best Collaboration	Nominated
2007	T.I.	Hip Hop Artist of the Year	Nominated
2007	T.I.	V-Style	Nominated
2007	T.I.	V-Hollywood	Nominated

== World Music Awards ==
The World Music Awards was established in 1989 and is an international awards show that annually honors musicians based on their worldwide sales figures, which are provided by the International Federation of the Phonographic Industry. T.I. was nominated eleven times.

Year	Nominee / work	Award	Result
2006	T.I.	World's Best Selling Rap/Hip Hop Artist	Nominated
2008	T.I.	World's Best Selling Rap/Hip Hop Artist	Nominated
2013	"2 Reasons"	World's Best Song	Nominated
2013	"2 Reasons"	World's Best Video	Nominated
2013	"Blurred Lines"	World's Best Song	Nominated
2013	"Blurred Lines"	World's Best Video	Nominated
2013	"T.I."	World's Best Male Award	Nominated
2013	"T.I."	World's Best Live Act	Nominated
2013	"T.I."	World's Best Entertainer of the Year	Nominated
2014	"Coke Bottle" (Agnez Mo feat. Timbaland & T.I.)	World's Best Song	Nominated
2014	"Coke Bottle" (Agnez Mo feat. Timbaland & T.I.)	World's Best Video	Won
