= Danja production discography =

The following list is a discography of production by Danja, an American music producer from Virginia Beach, Virginia. It includes a list of songs produced, co-produced and remixed by year, artist, album and title.

== Singles produced ==
List of singles as producer or co-producer, with selected chart positions and certifications, showing year released, performing artists and album name
Title	Year	Peak chart positions										Certifications	Album
Title	Year	US	US R&B	US Rap	CAN	UK	AUS	GER	IRE	NZ	SWI	Certifications	Album
"I'm So Fly" (Lloyd Banks)	2004	102	32	21	—	—	—	—	—	—	—		The Hunger for More
"Hey Now (Mean Muggin)" (Xzibit featuring Keri Hilson)	2004	93	52	—	—	9	44	—	—	21	42		Weapons of Mass Destruction and Appetite for Destruction
"Put You on the Game" (The Game)	2005	—	96	—	42	—	—	—	22	—	—		The Documentary
"Maneater" (Nelly Furtado)	2006	16	—	—	5	1	3	4	2	2	3		Loose
"Promiscuous" (Nelly Furtado featuring Timbaland)	2006	1	22	—	1	3	2	6	5	1	6	RIAA: 3× Platinum; ARIA: Platinum; MC: 3× Platinum	Loose
"We Takin' Over" (DJ Khaled featuring Akon, T.I., Rick Ross, Fat Joe, Birdman, and Lil Wayne)	2007	28	26	11	92	—	—	—	—	—	—	RIAA: Platinum; MC: Gold	We the Best
"Love Story" (Katharine McPhee)	2007	—	—	—	—	—	—	—	—	—	—		Katharine McPhee
"Wonder Woman" (Trey Songz)	2007	—	54	—	—	—	—	—	—	—	—		Trey Day
"Gimme More" (Britney Spears)	2007	3	—	—	1	3	3	7	2	15	4	RIAA: Platinum; ARIA: Gold; BPI: platinum; MC: 2× Platinum	Blackout
"Hurt" (T.I. featuring Alfamega and Busta Rhymes)	2007	—	89	—	—	—	—	—	—	—	—		T.I. vs T.I.P.
"Break the Ice" (Britney Spears)	2008	43	—	—	9	15	23	25	7	24	63		Blackout
"What It Is (Strike a Pose)" (Lil Mama featuring T-Pain)	2008	—	—	—	—	—	—	—	—	—	—		VYP (Voice of the Young People)
"No Matter What" (T.I.)	2008	72	42	17	66	—	—	—	—	—	—		Paper Trail
"Bad Girl" (Danity Kane featuring Missy Elliott)	2008	110	—	—	—	—	—	—	—	—	—	RIAA: Platinum	Welcome to the Dollhouse
"Official Girl" (Cassie featuring Lil Wayne)	2008	—	—	—	—	—	—	—	—	—	—		Non-album single
"Sober" (Pink)	2009	15	—	—	8	9	6	3	12	7	5		Funhouse
"Knock You Down (Keri Hilson featuring Kanye West and Ne-Yo)	2009	3	—	—	9	5	24	—	—	1	—		In a Perfect World...
"Work" (Ciara featuring Missy Elliott)	2009	—	—	—	—	—	52	66	—	31	—		Fantasy Ride
"That's Tha Homie" (Snoop Dogg)	2009	—	—	—	—	—	—	—	—	—	—		Malice n Wonderland
"Hello Good Morning" (Diddy-Dirty Money featuring T.I.)	2010	27	13	8	55	22	91	—	41	—	65		Last Train to Paris
"Believe" (Travis Garland)	2010	—	—	—	—	—	—	—	—	—	—		Non-album single
"Baby I Like It" (Kevin Cossom featuring Fabolous and Diddy)	2010	—	—	—	—	—	—	—	—	—	—		TBA
"Bad Girls" (M.I.A.)	2012	—	—	—	92	43	81	—	—	—	—		Matangi
"Sexy to Me" (JoJo)	2012	—	—	—	—	—	—	—	—	—	—		Non-album single
"Shining" (DJ Khaled featuring Beyoncé and Jay Z)	2017	57	23	—	72	71	93	—	—	4	—	RIAA: Platinum	Grateful
"Incapable" (Keyshia Cole)	2017	—	— (Note: "Incapable" did not enter the Hot R&B/Hip-Hop Songs chart, but peaked at number 50 on the R&B/Hip-Hop Airplay chart.)	—	—	—	—	—	—	—	—		11:11 Reset
"Vices" (Ludacris)	2017	—	—	—	—	—	—	—	—	—	—		TBA
"—" denotes items which were not released in that country or failed to chart.

== 2003 ==
=== Blackstreet - Level II ===
- 10. Why, Why (produced with Teddy Riley and Natural Blend)

=== Fabolous - Street Dreams ===
- 14. Forgive Me Father

== 2005 ==
=== Nickelus F ===
- 00. I Am What I Am (produced by Tommy Hittz)

=== Wyld - ??? ===
- 00. Hey
- 00. Drankin'

=== CaliStylz ===
- 00. Big Dreams
- 00. Buewtiful Thang
- 00. Pink Pantha (featuring O)
- 00. Motivation On 100 (featuring O)
- 00. Shatiez (featuring Wyld & Smoke)
- 00. Patty Cake (featuring Wyld & Hollow)
- 00. 64 Leanin' (co-produced by Rikki Allsum)
- 00. What It Does
- 00. That Dopica
- 00. To The Top (Ft. Nick Rage)

=== J-EyE - ??? ===
- 00. Say What huh

=== Justin Timberlake - Shark Tale: OST ===
- 00. Good Foot (Credited for "Additional Sweetening") (produced with Timbaland)

=== The Black Eyed Peas - Monkey Business ===
- 03. My Style (featuring Justin Timberlake) (produced with Timbaland)

=== The Notorious B.I.G. - Duets: The Final Chapter ===
- 04. Whatchu Want (featuring JAY-Z)

=== Keri Hilson - In The Mix OST ===
- 05. Hands & Feet

=== Ginuwine - Back II Da Basics ===
- 09. Betta Half

== 2006 ==
=== Nelly Furtado - Loose ===
- 01. Afraid (feat. Attitude) (produced with Timbaland)
- 04. Glow (produced with Timbaland)
- 05. Showtime
- 06. No Hay Igual (produced with Timbaland & Nisan Stewart)
- 08. Say It Right (produced with Timbaland)
- 09. Do It (produced with Timbaland)
- 11. Wait For You (produced with Timbaland)
- 12. All Good Things (Come to an End) (produced with Timbaland)

=== Nelly Furtado - Loose ===
- 00. Maneater (Remix) (featuring Lil' Wayne) (produced with Timbaland)

=== Justin Timberlake - FutureSex/LoveSounds ===
- 01. FutureSex/LoveSound (produced with Timbaland and Justin Timberlake)
- 02. SexyBack (featuring Timbaland) (produced with Timbaland and Justin Timberlake)
- 03. Sexy Ladies - Let Me Talk to You (Prelude) (produced with Timbaland and Justin Timberlake)
- 04. My Love (featuring T.I.) (produced with Timbaland and Justin Timberlake)
- 05. LoveStoned/I Think She Knows (Interlude) (produced with Timbaland and Justin Timberlake)
- 06. What Goes Around/Comes Around (Interlude) (produced with Timbaland and Justin Timberlake)
- 07. Chop Me Up (featuring Timbaland & Three 6 Mafia) (produced with Timbaland and Justin Timberlake)
- 09. Summer Love - Set the Mood (Prelude) (produced with Timbaland and Justin Timberlake)
- 10. Until The End Of Time (featuring The Benjamin Wright Orchestra) (produced with Timbaland and Justin Timberlake)
- 11. Losing My Way (featuring Timbaland & Hezekiah Walker and the Love Fellowship Crusade Choir) (produced with Timbaland and Justin Timberlake)

=== Lloyd Banks - Little Man (ST) & Promo Single For Rotten Apple ===
- 00. My House (featuring 50 Cent) (produced with Timbaland)

=== Diddy - Press Play ===
- 08. Wanna Move (featuring Ciara, Big Boi & Scar) (additional production by Big Boi)
- 09. Diddy Rock (featuring Timbaland, Twista & Shawnna)
- 14. After Love (featuring Keri Hilson) (produced with Timbaland)

=== Jeannie Ortega - No Place Like BKLYN ===
- 00. So Done (Remix)

=== Snoop Dogg - Tha Blue Carpet Treatment ===
- 07. Get a Light (featuring Damian Marley) (produced with Timbaland)

=== Danity Kane - Danity Kane ===
- 03. Want It (produced with Timbaland)
- 04. Right Now (produced with Timbaland)

=== Fantasia Barrino - Fantasia ===
- 09. Uneligible
- 12. Bore Me (Yawn)

=== Keshia Chanté - 2U ===
- 11. Too Much

== 2007 ==
=== Katharine McPhee - Katharine McPhee ===
- 01. Love Story
- 03. Open Toes
- 05. Not Ur Girl
- 06. Each Other
- 07. Dangerous
- 11. Neglected

=== 8Ball & MJG - Ridin High ===
- 01. Intro
- 04. Turn Up the Bump

=== Björk - Volta ===
- 01. Earth Intruders (produced with Björk and Timbaland)
- 04. Innocence (produced with Björk and Timbaland)
- 08. Hope (co-produced with Björk and Timbaland)

=== DJ Khaled - We The Best ===
- 03. We Takin' Over (featuring Akon, T.I., Rick Ross, Fat Joe, Birdman & Lil' Wayne)

=== Timbaland - Timbaland Presents Shock Value ===
- 02. Give It to Me (featuring Nelly Furtado & Justin Timberlake) (co-produced with Timbaland)
- 04. The Way I Are (featuring Keri Hilson & D.O.E.) (co-produced with Timbaland)
- 06. Come & Get Me (featuring 50 Cent & Tony Yayo) (co-produced with Timbaland)
- 08. Boardmeeting (featuring Magoo) (co-produced with Timbaland)
- 10. Scream (featuring Keri Hilson & Nicole Scherzinger) (co-produced with Timbaland)
- 11. Miscommunication (featuring Keri Hilson & Sebastian)

=== Timbaland - Give It to Me (Laff at Em) (Remix) - Single ===
- 00. Give It to Me (Laff at Em) (Remix) (featuring Justin Timberlake & JAY-Z) (co-produced with Timbaland)

=== Wyld Money - Street Power (Mixtape) ===
- 03. Chitty Rollin'
- 04. Ease Off Me
- 05. Recognize (Bring To The Streetz)
- 07. Street Power (featuring O)
- 08. Tuff Muthafucka (Cock That, Pop That)
- 09. Cocky (featuring Freeway)
- 11. I Get U Nigga
- 12. Is U Wit Me

=== T.I. - T.I. Vs. T.I.P. ===
- 07. "Hurt" (featuring Alfamega & Busta Rhymes)
- 16. Tell 'Em I Said That
- 17. Respect This Hustle

=== 50 Cent - Curtis ===
- 07. Ayo Technology (featuring Justin Timberlake & Timbaland) (co-produced with Timbaland)

=== B5 - Don't Talk, Just Listen ===
- 06. Tear Drops

=== Britney Spears - Blackout ===
- 01. Gimme More
- 04. Break the Ice
- 06. Get Naked (I Got a Plan)
- 09. Hot as Ice
- 11. Perfect Lover
- 13. Outta This World [Japanese Bonus Track]
- 15. Get Back [Bonus Track]

=== Duran Duran - Red Carpet Massacre ===
- 01. The Valley [produced with Duran Duran and Jimmy Douglass]
- 02. Red Carpet Massacre [produced with Duran Duran and Jimmy Douglass]
- 03. Nite Runner (featuring Justin Timberlake and Timbaland) (produced with Duran Duran, Justin Timberlake and Timbaland)
- 05. Box Full O' Honey [produced with Duran Duran and Jimmy Douglass]
- 06. Skin Divers (featuring Timbaland) [produced with Timbaland and Duran Duran]
- 07. Tempted [produced with Duran Duran and Jimmy Douglass]
- 08. Tricked Out [produced with Duran Duran and Jimmy Douglass]
- 09. Zoom In [produced with Duran Duran and Timbaland]
- 10. She's Too Much [produced with Duran Duran and Jimmy Douglass]
- 11. Dirty Great Monster [produced with Duran Duran and Jimmy Douglass]
- 12. Last Man Standing [produced with Duran Duran and Jimmy Douglass]

=== Natasha Bedingfield - N.B./Pocketful of Sunshine ===
- 11. Not Givin' Up

=== Yung Berg - Almost Famous EP ===
- 06. Painkiller (with Nikki Flores)

=== Nikki Flores - This Girl (Unreleased) ===
- 03. Suffocate
- 05. Painkiller
- 11. Beautiful Boy (feat. Baléwa Muhammad)

=== Menudo - Unreleased ===
- More Than Words
- Young Lovers
- Surrounded
- Save The Day

== 2008 ==
=== Layzie Bone - Thugz Nation ===
- 06. Bone Thug Boyz (feat. Krayzie Bone and Wish Bone)

=== Simple Plan - Simple Plan ===
- 01. When I'm Gone (produced with Dave Fortman)
- 03. The End (produced with Dave Fortman)
- 04. Your Love Is a Lie (produced with Dave Fortman)
- 06. Generation (produced with Dave Fortman and Max Martin)

=== Step Up 2: The Streets - Step Up 2 the Streets (soundtrack) ===
- 11. Bayje - "Impossible"
- 14. Kevin Cossom - "Say Cheese"

=== Fat Joe - The Elephant in the Room ===
- 04. Cocababy (featuring Jackie Rubio)

=== Danity Kane - Welcome to the Dollhouse ===
- 02. Bad Girl (featuring Missy Elliott)
- 04. Pretty Boy (Produced with The Clutch)
- 05. Strip Tease
- 00. Stop Time

=== Quinton Storm - The Calm Before The Storm (Mixtape) ===
- 05. I Know What Girls Like

=== Day26 - Day26 ===
- 03. In My Bed

=== Mariah Carey - E=MC² ===
- 01. Migrate (featuring T-Pain)

=== Calistylz - Calistylulated: The Animation (Mixtape) ===
- 03. Two In Da Mournin
- 10. Make It Happen
- 12. Rock Hard (featuring Owe)
- 15. Real Live
- 19. Pattycake (featuring Smoke, Wyld & Hollow)
- 20. Downtown (featuring Hollow)
- 21. Top Guinna

=== Lil Mama - VYP: Voice of the Young People ===
- 06. What It Is (Strike a Pose) (featuring T-Pain)

=== Madonna - Hard Candy ===
- 02. 4 Minutes (featuring. Justin Timberlake and Timbaland) (produced with Timbaland & Justin Timberlake)
- 05. Miles Away (produced with Timbaland & Justin Timberlake)
- 11. Devil Wouldn't Recognize You (produced with Timbaland & Justin Timberlake)
- 12. Voices (produced with Timbaland & Justin Timberlake and co-produced by Hannon Lane)
- 00. "Across The Sky" (featuring. Justin Timberlake) (produced with Timbaland & Justin Timberlake)
- 00. "Across The Sky (Timbaland Remix)" (featuring. Timbaland & Justin Timberlake) (produced with Timbaland & Justin Timberlake)
- 00. "Animal" (featuring. Justin Timberlake) (produced with Timbaland & Justin Timberlake)
- 00. "Latte (La La)" (produced with Timbaland)
- 00. "Infinity" (produced with Timbaland & Justin Timberlake)

=== Usher - Here I Stand ===
- 13. "Appetite"

=== Wyld Money - Street Power 2 (Mixtape) ===
- 01. Intro
- 02. I'ma Go Hard
- 05. Money Maker (feat. Hollow & Owe)
- 07. Baby I See You (feat. Owe & Smoke)
- 08. I'm Da Shit (feat. Hollow)
- 10. No Longer
- 11. Love In Lenox
- 12. Can I Get That
- 16. Last Of A Fast Dying Breed

=== Donnie Klang - Just a Rolling Stone ===
- 08. "Catch My Breath"

=== T.I. - Paper Trail ===
- 07. "No Matter What"

=== DJ Khaled - We Global ===
- 08. "She's Fine" (featuring Missy Elliott, Sean Paul & Busta Rhymes)

=== Pink - Funhouse ===
- 02. "Sober" (produced with Jimmy Harry and Tony Kanal)

=== Britney Spears - Circus ===
- 04. Kill the Lights
- 08. Blur
- 15. Rock Boy [iTunes bonus track]
- 00. Abroad [Unreleased]
- 00. Take the Bait [Unreleased]

=== Prima J - Prima J ===
- 15. "Take It To The Maximum" (produced with Timbaland)

== 2009 ==
=== Francesca Ramirez - Gotta Know (Promo) (Unreleased) ===
- 00. Gotta Know

(Produced With Timbaland)

=== Keri Hilson - In A Perfect World... ===
- 03. "Get Your Money Up" (produced with Polow Da Don)
- 05. "Knock You Down" (feat. Ne-Yo, Kanye West)
- 08. "Intuition" (additional production)
- 09. "How Does It Feel" (produced with Timbaland)
- 11. "Tell Him The Truth"
- 14. "Where Did He Go?" (produced with Timbaland)
- 15. "Quicksand" (Exclusive Amazon Bonus Track)

=== Whitney Houston - I Look to You ===
- 02. "Nothin' But Love"
- 09. "For The Lovers"

=== Ciara - Fantasy Ride ===
- 04. "Turntables" (featuring Chris Brown)
- 08. "Work" (featuring Missy Elliott)
- 14. "Echo" (Deluxe Edition Bonus Track)

=== Busta Rhymes - Back on My B.S. ===
- 04. "Shoot for the Moon"
- 00. "Freakin' You" (featuring Missy Elliott & Ne-Yo)

=== Esmée Denters - Outta Here ===
- 11. "Casanova" (featuring. Justin Timberlake) (Produced with Justin Timberlake)

=== Kevin Cossom - Hook vs. Bridge - The Mixtape ===
- 01. "She Got a Boyfriend"
- 04. "Relax" (feat. Snoop Dogg)
- 08. "My Ex (Remix)" (feat. Joe Budden)
- 10. "Withdrawals"
- 14. "Hang Over My Head"
- 15. "My Ex (Original Version)" (feat. Rick Ross)

=== Dizzee Rascal - Tongue n' Cheek ===
- 11. "Bad Behaviour" (with Tiësto)

=== T.I. - Paper Trail: Case Closed EP ===
- 05. "Hell Of A Life"

=== Tiësto - Kaleidoscope ===
- 04. "I Will Be Here" (feat. Sneaky Sound System) (with Tiësto)

=== Snoop Dogg - Malice n Wonderland ===
- 08. That's tha Homie

== 2010 ==
=== Jamie Drastik - The Magnet ===
- 05. How Many Girls (feat. Lil Jon)
- 06. All Day

=== Christina Aguilera - Bionic ===
- 15. You Lost Me (Radio Remix)

=== Ciara - Unreleased Tracks ===
- 00. "One More Dance"

=== Rick Ross - Teflon Don ===
- 07. "No. 1" (feat. Diddy & Trey Songz)

=== Usher - Raymond v. Raymond ===
- 11. "So Many Girls" (additional vocals by Diddy)
- 00. "Stay Down"

=== T.I. - No Mercy ===
- 11. "Everything on Me"

=== Diddy-Dirty Money - Last Train to Paris ===
- 03. "Yeah Yeah You Would" (feat. Grace Jones)
- 06. "Hate You Now"
- 14. "Hello Good Morning" (feat. T.I.)

=== Keri Hilson - No Boys Allowed ===
- 07. "Toy Soldier" (co-written with Keri)
- 16. "So Good" (Target Deluxe Edition Track)

=== Jamie Foxx - Best Night of My Life ===
- 05. "Freak" (feat. Rico Love)

=== M.I.A. - Vicki Leekx ===
- 12. "Bad Girls"

== 2011 ==
=== Jennifer Lopez - Love? ===
- 11. "Starting Over"

=== DJ Khaled - We the Best Forever ===
- 07. "Sleep When I'm Gone" Feat. Cee-Lo Green, Game & Busta Rhymes

=== Cody Simpson - Coast to Coast ===
- 01. "Good As It Gets"
- 02. "Crazy But True"

=== Joe Jonas - Fastlife ===
- 01. "All This Time"
- 04. "Love Slayer"
- 06. "Make You Mine"
- 09. "Not Right Now"
- 10. "Take It And Run"

=== Mary J. Blige - My Life II... The Journey Continues (Act 1) ===
- 04. "Next Level" (featuring Busta Rhymes)
- 08. "No Condition"

== 2012 ==
=== Usher - Looking 4 Myself ===
- 04. "I Care for U"
- 05. "Show Me"

=== Tank - This Is How I Feel ===
- 07. "This Is How I Feel"

=== Chris Brown - Fortune ===
- 03. "Till I Die" (featuring Big Sean and Wiz Khalifa)

=== Brandy - Two Eleven ===
- 14. "Can You Hear Me Now?"

=== Wiz Khalifa - O.N.I.F.C. ===
- 17. "Medicated" (featuring Chevy Woods & Juicy J)

=== Luke James - Whispers in the Dark ===
- 01. "Intro"
- 02. "Hurt Me"
- 03. "Oh God Feat. Hit-Boy"
- 04. "Be Bad"
- 05. "Heart Beat"
- 06. "Strawberry Vapors"
- 08. "Love Chile"
- 09. "The Audacity (Interlude)"
- 11. "Outro"

== 2013 ==
=== Wyld - Street Power 3 ===
- 01. "Intro"
- 02. "Bass Out Tha Trunk"
- 03. "So Hella" feat. Future
- 04. "Underworld" feat. Luke James
- 05. "What's Your Life Like"
- 06. "Night Night" feat. Danja
- 07. "Fadin"
- 08. "Better Quality"
- 09. "10,000,000" feat. Danja
- 10. "Ego Man"
- 11. "Street Propaganda" feat. Owe & The Clipse
- 12. "Hourglass"
- 13. "Credits Roll"

=== Kelly Rowland - Talk a Good Game ===
- 01. "Freak"

=== M.I.A. - The Bling Ring (Original Motion Picture Soundtrack) ===
- 04. "Bad Girls"

== 2014 ==
=== Kid Ink - My Own Lane ===
- 02. "The Movement"

=== Eric Bellinger - The Rebirth (Eric Bellinger album) ===
- 15. "Amateur Night"

=== Fat Joe - (Ft. Jennifer Lopez) ===
- 01. "Stressin'"

=== Chris Brown - X (Chris Brown album) ===
- 02. "Add Me In"
- 09. "Stereotype"

=== Luke James - Luke James ===
- 01. "Love XYZ"
- 05. "The Run"
- 07. "Exit Wounds"
- 08. "TimeX (Interlude)"
- 10. "Insane/Bombin' Out (Interlude)"

== 2015 ==
=== Rico Love - Turn the Lights On ===
- 03. "Trifling"
- 04. "Ride"
- 07. "Days Go By"

=== Jason Derulo - Everything Is 4 ===
- 11. "X2CU"

=== GhosMerck - Distorted Noize ===
- 10. "Throw It Up"

=== Rico Love - Days Go By (Promo) ===
- 00 "Days Go By"

=== Caligula - Road 2 Riches (Promo) ===
- 00 "Road 2 Riches"

=== Meek Mill - Dreams Worth More Than Money ===
- 13. "Stand Up"

=== DJ Khaled - I Changed a Lot ===
- 04. "I Swear I Never Tell Another Soul" (featuring Future, Yo Gotti and Trick Daddy)

=== Chris Brown - Royalty ===
- 10. "Discover"

=== Monica - Code Red ===
- 07. "Deep" (produced with Polow Da Don)

== 2016 ==
=== K. Michelle - More Issues Than Vogue ===
- 05. "If It Ain't Love"

== 2017 ==
=== DJ Khaled - Grateful ===
- 01. "(Intro) I'm So Grateful" (featuring Sizzla)
- 02. "Shining" (featuring Beyoncé and Jay Z)
- 06. "On Everything" (featuring Travis Scott, Rick Ross and Big Sean)
- 12. "I Can't Even Lie" (featuring Future & Nicki Minaj)

=== Agnez Mo - X ===
- 01. "Million $ Lover"
- 02. "Long As I Get Paid"
- 03. "Sorry"
- 04. "Level Up!"
- 05. "Wanna Be Loved"
- 07. "Karma"
- 09. "Beautiful Mistake"
- 10. "Get What You Give"

=== Gucci Mane - Mr. Davis ===
- 10. "We Ride" (featuring Monica)
- 16. "Miss My Woe" (featuring Rico Love)

=== Keyshia Cole - 11:11 Reset ===
- 4. "Incapable" (produced with Patrick Hayes)

=== Chris Brown - Heartbreak on a Full Moon ===
- 22. "Only 4 Me" (featuring Ty Dolla $ign and Verse Simmonds)

== 2018 ==
=== Justin Timberlake - Man of the Woods ===
- 01. "Filthy" (Co-produced with Justin Timberlake & Timbaland)
- 03. "Sauce (Co-produced with Justin Timberlake & Elliott Ives)
- 09. "Say Something" (featuring Chris Stapleton) (Co-produced with Justin Timberlake, Larrance Dopson & Timbaland)

== 2019 ==
=== Will Smith – Aladdin (2019 soundtrack) ===
- 11. "Friend Like Me (End Title)" (produced with DJ Khaled, Young Fyre, Ben Billions and Gavin Lurssen)

=== Big K.R.I.T. - K.R.I.T. Iz Here ===
- 06. "Energy" (produced with Rico Love)
- 07. "Obvious" featuring Rico Love (produced with M Millz & Qkaution)
- 19. "M.I.S.S.I.S.S.I.P.P.I."

=== Beyoncé - The Lion King: The Gift ===
- 12. "Mood 4 Eva" with Jay-Z and Childish Gambino featuring Oumou Sangaré (produced with DJ Khaled & Beyoncé)

=== BJ the Chicago Kid - 1123 ===
- 01. "Feel the Vibe" featuring Anderson .Paak (produced with Aaron Sledge & M Millz)
- 02. "Champagne" (produced with Aaron Sledge & Rico Love)

== 2021 ==
=== Kelly Clarkson – When Christmas Comes Around... ===
- 06. "Glow" (featuring Chris Stapleton)

== 2022 ==
=== Hayley Kiyoko – Panorama ===
- 01. "Sugar at the Bottom" (produced with KillDave and Pat Morrissey)
- 02. "Luna" (produced with KillDave, Pat Morrissey and Hayley Kiyoko)
- 03. "For the Girls" (produced with German)
- 04. "Flicker Start"
- 05. "Underground" (produced with KillDave, Pat Morrissey and Hayley Kiyoko)
- 06. "Forever" (featuring Johnny Rain) (produced with Johnny Rain)
- 07. "Deep in the Woods" (produced with KillDave, Pat Morrissey and Hayley Kiyoko)
- 08. "Supposed to Be"
- 09. "Chance"
- 12. "Found My Friends" (produced with KillDave, Pat Morrissey and Hayley Kiyoko)

== 2024 ==
=== Zara Larsson – Venus ===
- 01. Can't Tame Her
- 02. More Then This Was
- 04. Ammunition
- 05. None of These Guys
- 07. End of Time
- 09. Escape
- 10. Soundtrack
- 11. Venus

=== Justin Timberlake – Everything I Thought It Was ===
- 01. "Memphis" (produced with Justin Timberlake)
- 04. "Play" (produced with Justin Timberlake, Ryan Tedder, Federico Vindver and Andrew DeRoberts)
- 07. "Liar" (featuring Fireboy DML) (produced with Justin Timberlake)
- 10. "Sanctified" (featuring Tobe Nwigwe) (produced with Justin Timberlake and Rob Knox)
- 12. "Flame" (produced with Justin Timberlake and Rob Knox)
- 16. "Alone" (produced with Justin Timberlake)

=== Ste - MASHED WORLD MUTHAF*CKERS ===
- 04. "Connected/Spazgasm/Never Satisfied (Ste's Mash-Up Remix)" (produced with Ste)
