= Get Back Up (T.I. song) =

Single by T.I. featuring Chris Brown

from the album No Mercy
- Released: October 29, 2010
- Recorded: 2010
- Genre: Hip-hop
- Length: 4:25
- Label: Grand Hustle; Atlantic
- Songwriters: Clifford Harris; Chris Brown; Pharrell Williams
- Producer: The Neptunes

T.I. singles chronology
"Fancy" (2010)	"Get Back Up" (2010)	"That's All She Wrote" (2011)

Chris Brown singles chronology
"Yeah 3x" (2010)	"Get Back Up" (2010)	"Ain't Thinkin' 'Bout You" (2010)

"Get Back Up" is a song by American rapper T.I., released on October 29, 2010, as the fifth single from his seventh studio album No Mercy (2010). The song, produced by production team The Neptunes, features vocals from American R&B singer Chris Brown.

== Critical reception ==
Andy Kellman of AllMusic highlighted it. Brad Wete wrote a more mixed review: "On Get Back Up, he arrogantly apologizes for being human rather than for his crimes. That crown must be getting heavy." The Guardian panned the song for its scandalous nature: "One of the less likable tracks on this consistently misfiring album, which was recorded while T.I. was under house arrest for weapons charges (he's currently back in the slammer for probation violation), is Get Back Up. It claims the Atlanta MC is sorry for his misdeeds – but not that sorry – and finishes by painting him as the real victim ("As soon as you fall down, all the haters pass judgment"). The icing on the cake is provided by the equally tarnished Chris Brown, who sings the chorus: "When they push you down, you gotta get back up." Nice."

David Amidon wasn't happy either: "“Get Back Up”, the Chris Brown-featuring snoozefest, is a perfect example (of fail, embarrassment). Pharrell's Neptunes provide a beat that barely passes for mixtape fodder while T.I. spits empty bullshit about overcoming obstacles." Rolling Stone was disappointed: "The featherweight "Get Back Up" is about his more recent terrible choices: "My shortcomings hit the media thanks to TMZ, the AJC and Wikipedia," T.I. rhymes." USA Today was more positive: "Chris Brown lends a hand on Get Back Up, on which T.I. admits that his "road to redemption has no GPS" but chastises critics who rush to judge him. This is a recurring theme, in between boasts about his wealth and clever pickup lines." Washington Post called this song platitudinous and he continued: " "Get Back Up," which features Chris Brown, working a similar rehabilitation strategy with greater commercial success. "My road to redemption has no GPS," T.I. harrumphs on the song."

== Music video ==
The music video was released on November 3, 2010, directed by Chris Robinson. It features a Cameo appearance from DJ Drama. As of April 2023 the video has over 35 Million views.

== Charts ==
On November 11, 2010, "Get Back Up" debuted at number 70 on the US Billboard Hot 100 chart.

Chart performance for "Get Back Up"
Chart (2010–2011)	Peak position
Australia (ARIA)	91
German Black (Deutsche Trend)	9
US Billboard Hot 100	70
US Hot R&B/Hip-Hop Songs (Billboard)	37
US Hot Rap Songs (Billboard)	20
