= That's All She Wrote =

2010 Song by T.I. featuring Eminem

Single by T.I. featuring Eminem

from the album No Mercy
- Released: January 11, 2011
- Recorded: 2010
- Genre: Hip hop
- Length: 5:18
- Label: Grand Hustle; Atlantic
- Songwriters: Clifford Harris; Marshall Mathers; Lukasz Gottwald
- Producers: Dr. Luke; Max Martin

T.I. singles chronology
"No Mercy" (2010)	"That's All She Wrote" (2011)	"9 Piece" (2011)

Eminem singles chronology
"No Love" (2010)	"That's All She Wrote" (2010)	"I Need a Doctor" (2011)

"That's All She Wrote" is a song by American rapper T.I. featuring fellow American rapper Eminem. It was originally released on December 7, 2010, through Grand Hustle and Atlantic Records as a track from the former's seventh studio album No Mercy, before being released on January 11, 2011, as its eighth single. The song was written by the artists and producer Dr. Luke, with co-production from Max Martin.

== Background ==
"That's All She Wrote" marks the rappers' second collaboration, with the first being "Touchdown", from T.I.'s fifth studio album T.I. vs. T.I.P. (2007). Eminem's vocals on the tracks have been called "vicious" and "exhilaratingly mean". The first and second chorus, and the first, third, and fifth verses were delivered by T.I.; while the third chorus and the second and fourth verses were delivered by Eminem; and the last chorus was delivered by both rappers.

== Alternate version ==
The original version of this track leaked before its release in 2010, with a completely different first verse from Eminem. This leak caused Em to change his verse in the released version.

== Critical reception ==
Generally, "That's All She Wrote" was well-reviewed by critics. Ken Capobianco of The Boston Globe claimed the song is one of the best tracks on No Mercy, saying it "strut[s] with the undeniable T.I. charm and bravado." Nathan Rabin of The A.V. Club praised the song. He thought it was the only song on No Mercy in which T.I. doesn't sound "rote and generic" and said the song "boasts a vicious, exhilaratingly mean guest turn from Eminem."

== Track listing ==
Digital download

No.	Title	Writer(s)	Producer(s)	Length
1.	"That's All She Wrote"	Clifford Harris; Marshall Mathers; Lukasz Gottwald	Dr. Luke; Max Martin	5:18
Total length:				5:18

== Charts ==
Chart (2010)	Peak position
Canada Hot 100 (Billboard)	46
UK Singles (OCC)	158
US Billboard Hot 100	18
US Bubbling Under R&B/Hip-Hop Singles (Billboard)	1

== Certifications ==
Region	Certification	Certified units/sales
New Zealand (RMNZ)	Platinum	30,000^{‡}
United Kingdom (BPI)	Silver	200,000^{‡}
^{‡} Sales+streaming figures based on certification alone.
