= Yeah Ya Know (Takers) =

Single by T.I.

from the album No Mercy
- Released: June 1, 2010
- Recorded: 2010
- Genre: Hip hop
- Length: 4:28
- Label: Grand Hustle; Atlantic
- Songwriter: C. Harris
- Producers: DJ Toomp; Lil' C

T.I. singles chronology
"Winner" (2010)	"Yeah Ya Know (Takers)" (2010)	"Got Your Back" (2010)

Yeah Ya Know (Takers) is a song by American hip hop recording artist T.I., released on June 1, 2010 as the second single from his seventh studio album No Mercy (2010). It was also featured on the official soundtrack for the crime-thriller film Takers, and can be found on T.I.'s mixtape Fuck a Mixtape (2010), as well. The song was released on May 24, 2010. The track is included on No Mercy, as an iTunes and Amazon MP3 deluxe edition bonus track.

== Music video ==
The music video was released on June 2, 2010. It features different clips from the film Takers.

== Live performances ==
T.I. performed "Yeah Ya Know (Takers)", live at the 2010 BET Awards, alongside America rock band Blink 182 drummer, Travis Barker. Also Perform it at the VMA 2010.

== Chart performance ==
"Yeah Ya Know (Takers)" debuted at number 44 on Billboard Hot 100 and number 68 in Canada.

Chart (2010)	Peak position
Canada Hot 100 (Billboard)	68
US Billboard Hot 100	44
US Hot R&B/Hip-Hop Songs (Billboard)	65
