= No Mercy (T.I. album) =

Studio album by T.I.
- Released: December 7, 2010
- Recorded: 2009–2010
- Genre: Hip-hop
- Length: 61:02
- Labels: Grand Hustle; Atlantic
- Producers: Alex da Kid; Christopher "Tricky" Stewart; Danja; DJ Toomp; The-Dream; Dr. Luke; Max Martin; Hollywood Hot Sauce; Jake One; Jim Jonsin; Kanye West; Lil' C; Nard & B; Nikhil Seetharam; The Neptunes; Polow da Don; Rico Love; The Smash Factory; Mike Dupree; T-Minus

T.I. chronology
Paper Trail (2008)	No Mercy (2010)	Trouble Man: Heavy Is the Head (2012)

Singles from No Mercy
- 1. "I'm Back" Released: March 8, 2010; 2. "Yeah Ya Know (Takers)" Released: June 1, 2010; 3. "Got Your Back" Released: June 1, 2010; 4. "Ya Hear Me" Released: July 27, 2010; 5. "Get Back Up" Released: October 29, 2010; 6. "I Can't Help It" Released: November 22, 2010; 7. "No Mercy" Released: November 30, 2010; 8. "That's All She Wrote" Released: January 11, 2011

No Mercy is the seventh studio album by American rapper T.I. Originally titled King Uncaged, It was released on December 7, 2010, by Grand Hustle Records and Atlantic Records. Recording sessions for the album took place during 2009 to 2010. Production was handled by several high-profile record producers, including Kanye West, Polow da Don, The-Dream, J.U.S.T.I.C.E. League, The Neptunes, TrackSlayerz, Jake One, T-Minus, Christopher "Tricky" Stewart, Rico Love, Alex da Kid, DJ Toomp, Jim Jonsin, Danja and Dr. Luke, among others. The album also features guest appearances from several artists such as West and The-Dream themselves, as well as Kid Cudi, Scarface, Chris Brown, Eminem, Trey Songz, Pharrell, Drake, Christina Aguilera, Keri Hilson and Rick Ross, among others.

The album debuted at number four on the US Billboard 200 chart, selling 159,000 copies in its first week in the United States. Its was preceded by seven singles, including the Billboard Hot 100-top 40 entry "Got Your Back". Due to violating his parole stemming from a drug arrest, T.I. was forced to alter things, including the album's intended bellicose tone and its title, from "King Uncaged" to its eventual name "No Mercy". Additionally, four purported singles failed to make the final cut. Upon its release, No Mercy received mixed reviews from most music critics. A vinyl edition of the album was released on February 22, 2011. The album was later certified platinum by the Recording Industry Association of America (RIAA).

== Background ==
During an interview with MTV, T.I. confirmed that he had started recording for an album that would be released in 2010 following his release from prison. In February 2010, Jason Geter, T.I.'s manager and co-founder of Grand Hustle Records, said that the album is slated for a summer release. Rap-Up reported that the album is slated to be released around the same time as T.I.'s upcoming film project, Takers. It was later confirmed to be released on August 24, 2010. The release date was pushed up one week to August 17, 2010. The album was placed for pre-order on June 14, 2010.

"This is the most significant return from incarceration that the game has had since [All Eyez on Me]."

— T.I.

In an interview with Rolling Stone, T.I. stated that the album was the final album in a trilogy that started with T.I. vs. T.I.P. and included Paper Trail.

On March 1, 2010, Atlantic Records created a Twitter account to keep the public informed about T.I. news. Atlantic Records said a major announcement would take place on T.I.'s official site, TrapMuzik.com, on March 8, 2010. This announcement was the release of the first single from the album. On April 1, 2010, T.I. posted the first post-prison interview on his website and he described the album's direction being "more aggressive. It's going hard like classic T.I.". T.I. announced that the album would be titled King Uncaged on April 15, 2010.

T.I. stated he would refrain from "gun talk" on this release.

== Recording ==
T.I. had recorded 20 songs for the album in April 2009 and said that the recording style of the album would be a mix of writing his lyrics down and free-styling. In December 2009, former Warner Music Group executive, Kevin Liles, posted a message on his Twitter saying that T.I. was recording new material for a new album. Jim Jonsin told Rap-Up that "It doesn't seem like he missed a beat." On May 25, 2010, T.I. stated that he recorded 80 songs for the album. Jason Geter said that T.I. has been in the studio with Lil' C, DJ Toomp, Danja, The Runners and TrackSlayerz. He also said that much of the album's production would come from new producers. In an interview with Vibe, the production duo, TrackSlayerz, confirmed that they recorded three songs with T.I., including "I'm Back". DJ Toomp confirmed that he had already worked three songs with T.I. and plans to record two more. Vibe reported that Swizz Beatz has been contributing production to the album. Hip-hop DX reported that Drumma Boy will contribute to the project as well. Just Blaze revealed that he contributed four beats to the project. In an interview with Hot 107.9, T.I. stated Smash Factory, Timbaland and Dr. Luke had contributed production to the album as well.

Jason Geter confirmed potential features from The-Dream and Trey Songz. The-Dream commented on his work with T.I. saying "sounds great. He's sounding beautiful. His spirit is really good. He's got the eye of the tiger." Rap-Up had reported that T.I. has been recording with fellow Grand Hustle artist B.o.B, one track was confirmed by B.o.B being titled "Dream Me Up" with production from Cut the Check. In an interview with Vibe, DJ Toomp revealed that T.I. was looking to get André 3000 as a feature on the album. MTV reported that T.I. confirmed collaborations from Lady Gaga, Kid Rock, Young Dro, Mac Boney and Eminem. T.I. told Rolling Stone about the content he had recorded, "some songs talk about my time in prison — how I was affected by that, the way I've grown from that, things I see now that I may have not seen then, sometimes I talk about love, some songs I talk about life, some songs I talk about me being the shit on every level." Kanye West recorded six songs for the album at Avex Honolulu Studios in Honolulu, Hawaii. T.I. told MTV's Jayson Rodriguez that the song "Castle Walls" (featuring Christina Aguilera) originally belonged to Diddy who had commissioned the song for his fifth album Last Train to Paris with his group Dirty Money. But Diddy told T.I. "Yeah, this is my record, but you know what, I think this is a better fit for you. I think you should rock out on this one. I think this speaks volumes to where you are, what you going through, what you living and how you feel."

== Title change ==
The album was originally intended to be titled King Uncaged. The cover features T.I., in front of a stark white background, sunk deep into a wicker throne, a lion standing by his side: however, after T.I. was sent back to prison, the title and cover were altered. On October 25, 2010, T.I. announced on The Rickey Smiley Show that the album would now be titled No Mercy.

== Release and promotion ==
In preparation for the album's release, T.I. released a promotional mixtape titled Fuck a Mixtape with DJ Drama and DJ MLK. The mixtape was released on May 27, 2010.

=== Singles ===
Upon T.I's return from prison, he released the song appropriately titled "I'm Back". The song was the first official single to be released from No Mercy, with the single cover being released on T.I.'s official website on March 3, 2010. The song was released on March 8, 2010 on T.I.'s official site. The producers of the song, TrackSlayerz, described the song as "T.I. swatting at haters and assuming his rightful position atop the game after spending time behind bars". The song was available through iTunes on March 9, 2010. The single entered the US Billboard Hot 100 chart at number 44, it charted at number 12 on the Hot R&B/Hip-Hop Songs chart, it charted at number seven on the Hot Rap Tracks chart. The single attained nearly respectable international charting. In Canada, the single entered the Canadian Hot 100 at number 44, while in Germany, the single entered the German Black Chart at number 29. The single is nominated for a Grammy Award for Best Rap Solo Performance at the 2011 53rd Annual Grammy Awards.

"Yeah Ya Know (Takers)" was released as the second official single from the album on May 24, 2010. The song was produced by DJ Toomp. It was released on iTunes for purchase on June 1, 2010. The single entered the Billboard Hot 100 at number 44, and charted at number 65 on the Hot R&B/Hip-Hop Songs chart. The single attained international charting. In Canada, the single entered the Canadian Hot 100 at number 68. It will also serve as an official soundtrack for the crime-thriller film Takers and can be found on T.I.'s mixtape prior to the album, Fuck a Mixtape. Its music video was released on June 2, 2010. The video features the song playing over clips from the movie Takers.

"Got Your Back" was released as the third official single from the album, serviced on June 1, 2010, as the album's lead mainstream single. The single entered the Billboard Hot 100 at number 38, charted at number 10 on the Hot R&B/Hip-Hop Songs chart, and charted at number 4 on the Hot Rap Tracks chart. The single attained respectable international charting. In Canada, the single entered the Canadian Hot 100 at number 48, charted at number 45 on the UK Singles Chart, and charted at number 19 on the UK R&B Chart. In the Netherlands, the single entered the Dutch Singles Chart at number 81, while in the Republic of Ireland, the single entered the Irish Singles Chart at number 33; as well as in Germany, the single entered the German Black (Deutsche Trend) at number 6, and in Belgium, the single entered the Belgium (Ultratop Flanders) chart at number 21. The song features American R&B singer-songwriter Keri Hilson who he wrote the DJ Toomp-produced track with.

"Ya Hear Me" was released as the fourth official single from the album. It was produced by ATL producer Keith Mack, who has previously produced tracks such as "Live in the Sky", "Ride wit Me" and "My Type", for T.I.. It was sent to the iTunes Store on July 28, 2010.

The song, titled "Get Back Up" featuring American pop and R&B singer Chris Brown, produced by The Neptunes, was the fifth official single to be released from No Mercy. It was released on October 29, 2010 to the iTunes Store. The single entered the Billboard Hot 100 at number 70, charted at number 37 on the Hot R&B/Hip-Hop Songs chart, and charted at number 20 on the Hot Rap Tracks chart. The single attained international charting. In Australia, the single entered the Australian ARIA Singles Chart at number 91, and in Germany, the single entered the German Black (Deutsche Trend) at number 9.

"I Can't Help It" was the sixth official single from the album. The track features guest appearances from a fellow Atlanta-based rapper Rocko and was released to the iTunes Store on November 22, 2010. The single was produced by Smash Factory.

On November 30, 2010, the title track, featuring The-Dream, was officially released through iTunes. The single was released as the seventh single from the album.

== Critical reception ==
Professional ratings
Review scores
Source	Rating
AllMusic	2.5/5 stars
Entertainment Weekly	(B)
The Guardian	2/5 stars
Los Angeles Times	2.5/4 stars
Pitchfork	(5.5/10)
PopMatters	(4/10)
Rolling Stone	3/5 stars
Slant Magazine	2.5/5 stars
USA Today	3/4 stars
The Washington Post	(unfavorable)

Upon its release, No Mercy received generally mixed reviews from music critics. At Metacritic, which assigns a normalized rating out of 100 to reviews from mainstream critics, the album received an average score of 59, based on 15 reviews, which indicates "mixed or average reviews". Henry Adaso of About.com states "Arguably T.I.'s worst outing yet, No Mercy relies on gruesomely listless party tunes and the occasional whining" and stating "The production on No Mercy is painfully generic for a rapper once known for rocking some of the best beats money can buy". AllMusic writer Andy Kellman described it as "a career low point for all involved" however he states "There's a sense that he'll regain focus once his legal matters settle". Nathan Rabin of The A.V. Club states "As is the case with 2Pac, it's difficult to separate the ongoing crime drama/soap opera of T.I.'s life from the music he creates. So it should come as no surprise that No Mercy, the superstar's latest post-and-pre-prison-stint album, reflects the life lessons and soul-searching that come with extended jail time at the height of a superstar's fame". Ken Capobianco of The Boston Globe noted that "throughout this disc there's an unsettling celebration of the untamed life without any reflection on the consequences T.I. often laments". Entertainment Weekly's Brad Wete noted that "The self-proclaimed King of the South addresses his troubles on several tracks while on others he remains unrepentant, though: On Get Back Up, he arrogantly apologizes for being human rather than for his crimes" Wete ended the review by stating "That crown must be getting heavy".

Los Angeles Times writer Jeff Weiss stated that "No Mercy is largely consumed with penitence and a looming penitentiary sentence". Pitchfork's Tom Breihan commented that "Throughout No Mercy, Tip remains an absolutely impeccable rapper, delivering even his lamest pieces of self-help nothingness in masterful clumps of singsong cadence and slurry double-time bounce. I get the impression that he could still absolutely rip a track to shreds if he could only get himself excited about the prospect. And every so often, No Mercy crackles to life, and we hear flashes of the rap hero Tip could still be". Giving it a 4 out of 10 rating, David Amidon of PopMatters stated that "While peaks and valleys can be used in a positive sense, the way Tip's offering here dips in and out of quality seems much too violent for most longtime followers to keep up with. There are references to making terrible choices personally, which is fine, but as a musician one assumes a certain responsibility to avoid those professional pitfalls as well". Rolling Stone writer Jody Rosen cited it as T.I.'s desire for redemption takes on gospel overtones and "Make no mistake, T.I. still knows how to throw a party. No Mercy is a sleek pop-rap record: 14 taut, catchy songs with beats from big-name producers and an array of top-flight guests. No Mercy suggests that, among A-list rappers, T.I. is the one with the most well-honed pop sensibility".

Slant Magazine's Jesse Cataldo viewed it as "This is the kind of material that, cloaked in ripe hooks and sharp beats, can sustain mediocrity" stating that the album is "Stocked with smart producers and reshuffled tropes, the album buzzes with excitement and relevance even when it's thematically comatose" and that "No Mercy is full of these kind of moments, where suspect lyrical passages coast by under smooth surfaces". The Washington Post's Sean Fennessey saw it as his "Confused, and worse, dull album". Steve Jones of USA Today noted that T.I. on the album "He deals with this quandary on his star-studded No Mercy, where he alternately cops to his character flaws while condemning celebrity-hating detractors who make things miserable for him". Andy Gill of The Independent gave it three out of five stars and stated that "tracks like the delinquent reminiscence "How Life Changed" and the mea culpa duet with Chris Brown, "Get Back Up", teeter queasily on the cusp of boast and apology. But you have to admire the gall of a repeat offender brazen enough to feature a quote from Helen Keller in his lyric booklet". Caroline Sullivan of The Guardian commented that most of its songs "range from dour, generic pieces that can't conceal his listlessness to a few pretty good-ish party songs with sharp hooks and crackling beats. You can only hope he rediscovers his swagger".

== Commercial performance ==
No Mercy debuted at number four on the US Billboard 200 chart, selling over 159,000 copies in its first week of release. The album charted at number one on the Billboard R&B/Hip-Hop Albums and Billboard Rap Albums chart, and at number three on the Digital Albums chart. It was certified platinum by the RIAA in September 2024.

No Mercy attained international charting. In Australia the album entered the Australian ARIA Albums Chart at number 69, in Canada the album entered the Canadian Albums Chart at number 35, in France the album entered the French Albums Chart at number 173, in Japan the album entered the Japanese Albums Chart at number 88, and in New Zealand the album entered the New Zealand Albums Chart at number 39.

== Track listing ==
Standard edition
No.	Title	Writer(s)	Producer(s)	Length
1.	"Welcome to the World" (featuring Kanye West and Kid Cudi)	Clifford Harris, Jr.; Kanye West; Scott Mescudi	West	4:14
2.	"How Life Changed" (featuring Mitchelle'l and Scarface)	Harris, Jr.; Mitchelle'l Sium; Brad Jordan; Darwin "Lil' C" Quinn; Glenda Proby; Michael Dupree	Lil' C; Mike Dupree	4:30
3.	"Get Back Up" (featuring Chris Brown)	Harris, Jr.; Christopher Brown; Pharrell Williams	The Neptunes	4:24
4.	"I Can't Help It" (featuring Rocko)	Harris, Jr.; Rodney Hill; Larrance Dopson; Lamar "Mars" Edwards	The Smash Factory	3:32
5.	"That's All She Wrote" (featuring Eminem)	Harris, Jr.; Marshall Mathers; Lukasz Gottwald; Max Martin	Dr. Luke; Max Martin (co.)	5:18
6.	"No Mercy" (featuring The-Dream)	Harris, Jr.; Terius Nash; Christopher "Tricky" Stewart	Stewart; The-Dream	4:07
7.	"Big Picture"	Harris, Jr.; Aldrin Davis	DJ Toomp	4:25
8.	"Strip" (featuring Young Dro and Trey Songz)	Harris, Jr.; D'Juan Hart; Tremaine Neverson; Quinn; Tony Scales	Lil' C	3:42
9.	"Salute"	Harris, Jr.; Jacob Dutton	Jake One	3:07
10.	"Amazing" (featuring Pharrell)	Harris, Jr.; Williams	The Neptunes	5:14
11.	"Everything on Me"	Harris, Jr.; Nathaniel Hills; Marcella Araica	Danja	4:24
12.	"Poppin Bottles" (featuring Drake)	Harris, Jr.; Aubrey Graham; Tyler Williams; Nikhil Seetharam; Alexander Izquierdo; Clarence Coffee, Jr.; Jordan Johnson; Marcus Lomax; Stefan Johnson	T-Minus; Seetharam	5:20
13.	"Lay Me Down" (featuring Rico Love)	Harris, Jr.; Richard Butler, Jr.; James Scheffer; Zukhan Bey; Juan Atkins; Richard Davis	Jim Jonsin; Rico Love	3:16
14.	"Castle Walls" (featuring Christina Aguilera)	Harris, Jr.; Christina Aguilera; Alexander Grant; Holly Hafferman	Alex da Kid	5:29

Bonus tracks
No.	Title	Writer(s)	Producer(s)	Length
15.	"I'm Back"	Harris, Jr.; Dexter Randall; Demetri Duncan; Charles Bobino III; Otha "Vakseen" Davis III	TrackSlayerz	3:43
16.	"Got Your Back" (featuring Keri Hilson)	Harris, Jr.; Keri Hilson; Davis	DJ Toomp	4:24
17.	"Yeah Ya Know (Takers)"	Harris, Jr.; Davis; Quinn	DJ Toomp; Lil' C	4:28

Deluxe version (bonus tracks)
No.	Title	Writer(s)	Producer(s)	Length
15.	"Ya Hear Me"	Harris; Keith McMasters	Keith Mack	4:04
16.	"Pledge Allegiance" (featuring Rick Ross)	Harris; William Roberts II; Kevin Crowe, Erik Ortiz, Kenny Bartolomei	J.U.S.T.I.C.E. League	7:46

iTunes pre-order bonus tracks
No.	Title	Writer(s)	Producer(s)	Length
18.	"Follow Your Dreams" (featuring Shun Hendrix)	Harris; Shun Hendrix; Jamal Jones; Paul Dawson	Polow da Don; Hollywood Hot Sauce	3:55

Target and Amazon.com bonus tracks
No.	Title	Writer(s)	Producer(s)	Length
19.	"That's What I Thought" (featuring Mac Boney and Killer Mike)	Harris; Mac Boney; Michael Render; Brandon "Nard" Rackley, Bernard "B" Rosser	Nard & B	4:37
20.	"Like So"	Harris; Quinn; Andrew "Drew Money" Thielk	Lil' C	3:08

Sample credits

- "Lay Me Down" contains a sample from "Clear" performed by Cybotron.
- "Strip" contains a sample from "Ready or Not Here I Come (Can't Hide From Love)" performed by The Delfonics.

== Personnel ==
Credits for No Mercy adapted from AllMusic.

- Kory Aaron – assistant, assistant engineer
- Darren Ankenman – photography
- Marcella "Ms. Lago" Araica – mixing
- Greg Gigendad Burke – art direction, design
- John "JD" Butler – assistant
- Smith Carlson – assistant engineer
- Elliot Carter – engineer, mixing
- Andrew Coleman – engineer
- Thomas Cullison – assistant
- Danja – producer
- Kevin "KD" Davis – mixing
- Andrew Dawson – engineer
- Megan Dennis – production coordination
- Dr. Luke – instrumentation, producer, programming
- Bojan Dugic – assistant
- Michael "Emaydee" Dupree – producer
- Eminem – vocals
- John Frye – mixing
- Chris Galland – assistant
- Chris Gehringer – mastering
- Jason Geter – A&R, executive producer
- Serban Ghenea – mixing
- Noah Goldstein – engineer
- Tatiana Gottwald – assistant
- John Hanes – engineer
- Jake One – engineer, keyboards, producer
- Jim Jonsin – keyboards, producer, programming
- Keke – production coordination
- Helen Keller – quotation author
- Alex da Kid – producer
- Anthony Kilhoffer – engineer, mixing
- Jerel Lake – assistant
- Kevin "Coach K" Lee – co–executive producer, A&R
- Lil' C – producer
- Rico Love – producer
- Erik Madrid – assistant
- Charles Malone – arranger
- Rob Marks – engineer
- Robert Marks – mixing
- Manny Marroquin – mixing
- Orlando McGhee – A&R
- Ian Mercel – assistant
- Amos Miller – keyboards
- Terius "the-Dream" Nash – arranger, producer
- Jean Nelson – A&R
- The Neptunes – producer
- Nick Chahwala – arranger, engineer
- Anthony Palazzole – assistant
- Douglas Peterson – A&R
- Joi Pitts – marketing
- Oscar Ramirez – engineer
- Irene Richter – production coordination
- Gee Roberson – A&R, executive producer
- Tim Roberts – mixing assistant
- Edward Sanders – assistant
- Ray Seay – mixing
- Derrick Selby – assistant
- Danny Silvestri – arranger
- Iain Sindley – assistant
- Brian Springer – assistant engineer
- C. "Tricky" Stewart – producer
- Rawle Stewart – co–executive producer
- Mike Strange – engineer, vocal mixing
- T-Minus – Producer
- T.I. – vocals
- T.I.P. – executive producer
- Brian "B-luv" thomas – Assistant
- Pat Thrall – engineer
- DJ Toomp – guitar, keyboards, producer
- Carolyn Tracey – package production
- Kanye West – producer
- Kevin Wilson – assistant
- Emily Wright – engineer

== Charts ==
=== Weekly charts ===
Weekly chart performance for No Mercy
Chart (2010–2011)	Peak position
Australian Albums (ARIA)	69
Canada Top Albums/CDs (RPM)	35
French Albums (SNEP)	173
Irish Albums (IRMA)	27
Japanese Albums (Oricon)	88
New Zealand Albums (RMNZ)	39
Polish Albums (ZPAV)	52
UK Albums (Official Charts)	39
UK R&B Albums (Official Charts)	6
US Billboard 200	4
US Top Rap Albums (Billboard)	1
US Top R&B/Hip-Hop Albums (Billboard)	1

=== Year-end charts ===
Year-end chart performance for No Mercy
Chart (2011)	Position
US Billboard 200	51
US Top R&B/Hip-Hop Albums (Billboard)	12

== Certifications ==
Certifications for No Mercy
Region	Certification	Certified units/sales
United States (RIAA)	Platinum	1,000,000^{‡}
^{‡} Sales+streaming figures based on certification alone.
