= Got Your Back =

Single by T.I. featuring Keri Hilson

from the album No Mercy
- Released: June 1, 2010
- Genre: Hip hop; R&B
- Length: 4:24 (album version); 3:45 (radio edit)
- Label: Grand Hustle; Atlantic
- Songwriters: Clifford Harris; Aldrin Davis; Young Jedi
- Producer: DJ Toomp

T.I. singles chronology
"Yeah Ya Know (Takers)" (2010)	"Got Your Back" (2010)	"Make Up Bag" (2010)

Keri Hilson singles chronology
"Oh Africa" (2010)	"Got Your Back" (2010)	"Breaking Point" (2010)

Music video
- "T.I. - Got Your Back ft. Keri Hilson [Official Video]" on YouTube

"Got Your Back" is a song by American hip hop recording artist T.I., released on June 1, 2010, as the lead single (third overall) from his seventh studio album No Mercy (2010). The song features American R&B singer-songwriter Keri Hilson. T.I. wrote the song with Young Jedi, alongside the track's producer DJ Toomp. "Got Your Back" was certified Gold by the Recording Industry Association of America (RIAA) on December 15, 2010.

== Background ==
In an interview with Jamie Foxx, when asked about the song, T.I. said, "[It's] basically just me showing my appreciation to all the ladies who got they man’s back in the world, acknowledging the one who had my back and acknowledging the ones that got they [sic] man’s back at the same time." Preceded by the singles "I'm Back" and "Yeah Ya Know (Takers)", "Got Your Back" can be found as a bonus track on the album No Mercy, as well as T.I.'s mixtape Fuck a Mixtape (2010).

== Composition and critical reception ==
"Got Your Back"
A sample of "Got Your Back", featuring vocals from T.I. and Hilson.

The song features a "bright", "bouncy" electro/synth beat. Hilson sings the hook, while T.I. raps the verses and harmonizes in the song's melodic bridge. According to Robbie Daw of Idolator the song's intro is reminiscent of Hilson's "Knock You Down". Although stating the song fell a little short, a Chicago Now writer called it a "solid, feel-good summer joint", and commented, "All the elements are here for this one to blow up with the masses: a catchy, repetitive hook from Keri Hilson, a poppy, feel-good production, and some memorable messages from T.I."

According to DJBooth, the song "essentially attempts to recreate the success of 'Whatever You Like', calling the Hilson-T.I. pairing, "A combination like that could only mean one thing; we’ve got a hit on our hands." Ed Easton Jr. of WNOW-FM said the song takes T.I. back to "Whatever You Like", commenting, "Keri Hilson adds a perfect mix of pop and passion to the hook of the song, as it is a bit of a dance track that all the ladies and some guys can vibe to this summer." UK SoulCulture thought that releasing a "song for the streets and song for the ladies" was trying to recreate the vibe of his last album, but wasn't sure if the latest set lived up to par.

== Music video ==
The music video was directed by Chris Robinson. It was filmed on June 30, 2010, and premiered on July 22, 2010. It features cameo appearances from T.I.'s wife Tameka "Tiny" Cottle, and actors Lance Gross, Keith Robinson, and Jill Marie Jones.

== Charts ==
=== Weekly charts ===
Chart (2010)	Peak position
Belgium (Ultratip Flanders)	21
Canada Hot 100 (Billboard)	48
German Black (Deutsche Trend)	6
Irish Singles Chart	33
Dutch Singles Chart	81
UK R&B Chart	19
UK Singles Chart	45
US Billboard Hot 100	38
US Hot R&B/Hip-Hop Songs (Billboard)	10
US Hot Rap Songs (Billboard)	4
US Rhythmic Airplay (Billboard)	9

=== Certifications ===
Region	Certification	Certified units/sales
New Zealand (RMNZ)	Gold	15,000^{‡}
United States (RIAA)	Platinum	1,000,000^{‡}
^{‡} Sales+streaming figures based on certification alone.

=== Year-end charts ===
Chart (2010)	Position
US Hot R&B/Hip-Hop Songs (Billboard)	55
US Rhythmic (Billboard)	46
