= Big Shit Poppin' (Do It) =

2007 single by T.I.

Single by T.I.

from the album T.I. vs. T.I.P.
- Released: May 29, 2007
- Genre: Hip hop
- Length: 4:47 (album version); 4:00 (radio edit)
- Label: Grand Hustle, Atlantic
- Songwriters: Clifford Harris, Harold Faltermeyer
- Producer: Mannie Fresh

T.I. singles chronology
"We Takin' Over" (2007)	"Big Shit Poppin' (Do It)" (2007)	"You Know What It Is" (2007)

"Big Shit Poppin' (Do It)" (edited for radio as "Big Things Poppin' (Do It)") is a song by American rapper T.I., released on May 29, 2007, as the lead single from his fifth album T.I. vs. T.I.P. (2007). The song was produced by Mannie Fresh. The song was listed as No. 66 on Rolling Stone's "The 100 Best Songs of 2007" list.

== Release ==
The hip hop song leaked on April 14, 2007, on numerous P2P file-sharing sites. "Big Shit Poppin (Do It)", debuted at number thirty-nine on Billboard's Hot R&B/Hip-Hop Songs chart on April 26, 2007. On May 22, the single was released on the iTunes Store and the rest of the album was made available for pre-order.

== Background ==
The single samples a guitar riff from the song "Top Gun Anthem", the theme of the 1986 film Top Gun. "Big Things Poppin' (Do It)" is used with alternative lyrics as the theme song to an ESPN SportsCenter special known as the "Who's Now?" series, which was aired throughout the summer of 2007. The song is featured in the multiplayer online casual rhythm game DANCE! Online. The song is used in the Wayans brothers' 2009 parody film Dance Flick.

The single was performed at the 2007 BET Awards and at the 2007 MTV Video Music Awards. The single won the award for Hot Ringtone at the 2007 BET Hip Hop Awards.

== Remixes ==
The official remix was produced by Grand Hustle in-house production duo Nard & B, and was billed as the "Grand Hustle Remix". The remix features guest appearances from Grand Hustle artists Big Kuntry King, Alfamega, Mac Boney and JR Get Money. The song was later remixed by American rappers Cassidy, Fabolous and Swizz Beatz.

== Chart performance ==
The single debuted at number 30 on the US Billboard Hot 100 chart on June 9, 2007, and went on to peak at number nine. On the Hot R&B/Hip-Hop Songs it reached #7. The song reached number two on the Billboard Hot Rap Tracks. As of August 2011, the song has sold more than a million digital downloads in the US alone. The single debuted at number twenty-one in New Zealand and peaked at number eight. It was the first solo chart entry by T.I. in New Zealand. It was certified Gold by RIANZ on August 23, 2009, selling over 7,500 copies.

=== Weekly charts ===
Chart (2007)	Peak position
Canada Hot 100 (Billboard)	75
Japan (Japanese Singles Chart)	5
New Zealand (Recorded Music NZ)	8
US Billboard Hot 100	9
US Hot R&B/Hip-Hop Songs (Billboard)	7
US Hot Rap Songs (Billboard)	2
US Pop 100 (Billboard)	20
US Rhythmic Airplay (Billboard)	9

=== Year-end charts ===
Chart (2007)	Position
New Zealand (Recorded Music NZ)	30
US Billboard Hot 100	75
US Hot R&B/Hip-Hop Songs (Billboard)	42

== Track listings ==
=== Promo CD single ===
1. Clean version
2. dirty, dirty
1. Instrumental

=== Vinyl ===
Side A

1. Amended version
2. Instrumental

Side B

1. Explicit version
2. Acapella

== Certifications ==
Region	Certification	Certified units/sales
New Zealand (RMNZ)	Gold	7,500^{*}
^{*} Sales figures based on certification alone.
