= FutureSex/LoveSound =

2006 song by Justin Timberlake

Song by Justin Timberlake

from the album FutureSex/LoveSounds
- Released: September 12, 2006
- Studio: Thomas Crown (Virginia Beach)
- Genre: New wave
- Length: 4:01
- Label: Jive; Zomba
- Songwriters: Justin Timberlake; Tim Mosley; Nate "Danja" Hills
- Producers: Timbaland; Justin Timberlake; Nate "Danja" Hills

"FutureSex/LoveSound" is a song by American singer Justin Timberlake. It was released as the opening track from his second studio album, FutureSex/LoveSounds, on September 12, 2006, through Jive Records and Zomba. A new wave song incorporating elements of industrial rock and synth-funk, it was written and produced by Timberlake, Timbaland, and Danja. Between the 2002 release of his debut solo album, Justified, and the development of FutureSex/LoveSounds, Timberlake felt "burnt out" and took a two-year hiatus from the music industry.

After FutureSex/LoveSounds was released, the track charted on the US Bubbling Under Hot 100 at number thirteen. In reviews of FutureSex/LoveSounds, some music critics praised the song's production and catchiness, while others criticized its lyrical content. Timberlake performed "FutureSex/LoveSound" at DirecTV's Super Saturday Night, the Hollywood Palladium, and the Wireless Festival. He also included it on the set lists of three of his concert tours: the FutureSex/LoveShow (2007), The 20/20 Experience World Tour (2013–2015), and The Forget Tomorrow World Tour (2024–2025).

== Background and production ==
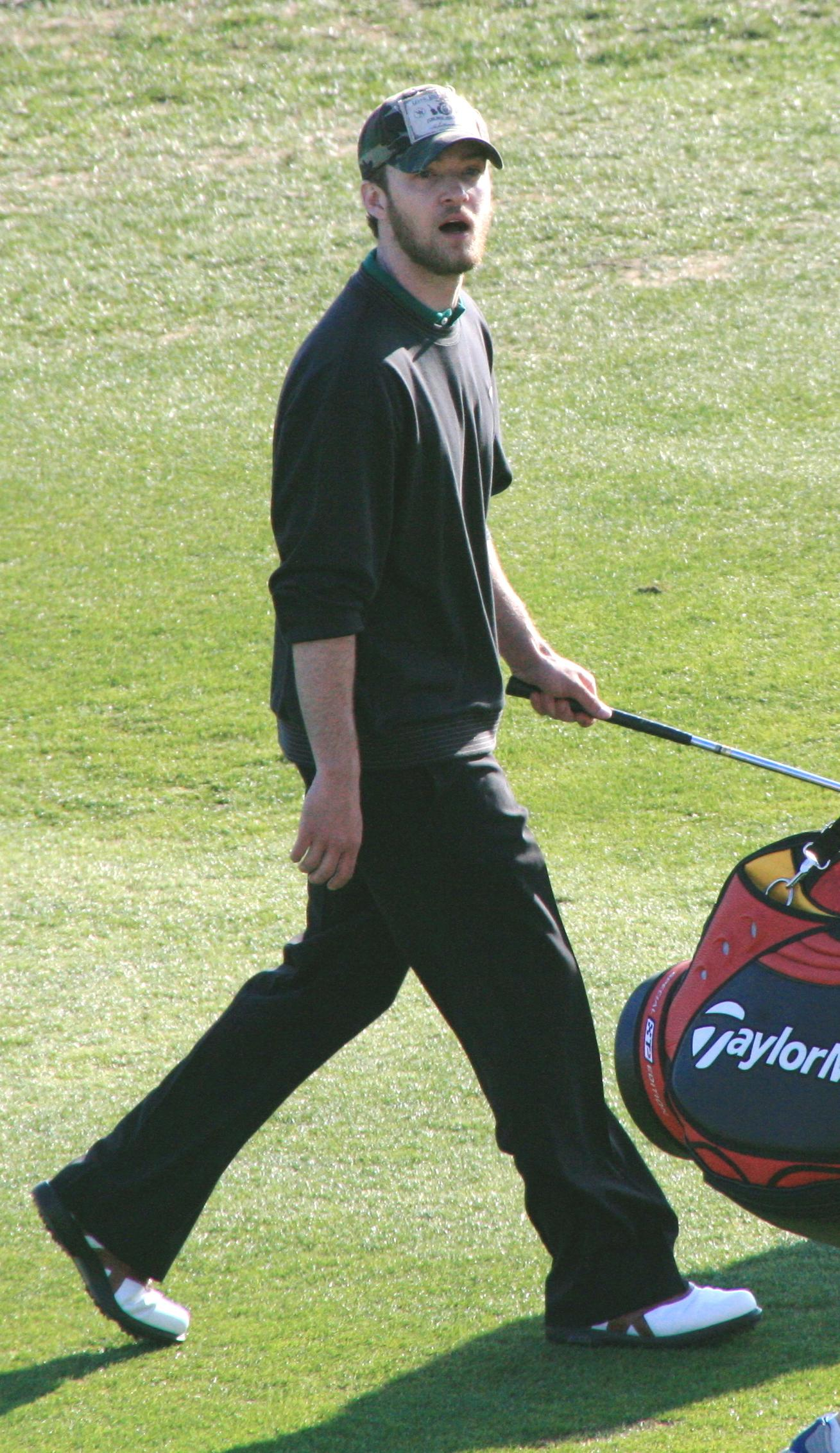
Timberlake in 2006

In November 2002, Justin Timberlake released his debut solo album, Justified, which was a commercial success and received generally positive reviews from music critics. The album spawned four singles, including "Rock Your Body" and "Cry Me a River", which reached the top-five of the US Billboard Hot 100. After its release, Timberlake thought he "lost his voice" in the sense that he did not like what he was doing. He felt "burnt out" after Justified and he took a break from the music industry to become a film actor. His first role during this time was a journalist in the thriller Edison Force (2006). He also appeared in the 2006 films Alpha Dog, Black Snake Moan, and Southland Tales, and voiced Prince Artie Pendragon in the animated film Shrek the Third (2007).

When Timberlake felt inspired to compose songs again, he chose not to reunite with his former band NSYNC, though he considered it after his first record. Timberlake went to Justified collaborator Timbaland's new Thomas Crown Studios in Virginia Beach, Virginia, to begin sessions for his second album. Neither Timberlake nor Timbaland had any idea of what the album would be; there was no plan or title for it. "FutureSex/LoveSound" was written and produced by Timberlake, Timbaland, and Nate "Danja" Hills. Jimmy Douglas recorded the song at Thomas Crown Studios and mixed it with Timbaland at The Hit Factory Criteria in Miami, Florida. Danja performed keyboards and drums with Timbaland. Paul Blake played guitar while Timberlake sang background vocals.

== Release and live performances ==
FutureSex/LoveSounds was released on September 12, 2006, through Jive Records and Zomba, with "FutureSex/LoveSound" as the opening track. "FutureSex/LoveSound" peaked at number thirteen on the Billboard Bubbling Under Hot 100 dated September 30, 2006. It was used as the opening song on Timberlake's FutureSex/LoveShow in 2007. Timberlake performed the song as part of the set list for his comeback performance at DirecTV's Super Saturday Night in New Orleans on February 2, 2013. Prior to the 55th Annual Grammy Awards, Timberlake held a concert at Hollywood Palladium in Los Angeles, where he performed "FutureSex/LoveSound" in a medley with "Need You Tonight" (1987) by INXS and his 2007 single "LoveStoned/I Think She Knows". Timberlake performed the song on the first day of the Wireless Festival in London on July 12. The song was also included on the set lists of Timberlake's The 20/20 Experience World Tour (2013–2015) and The Forget Tomorrow World Tour (2024–2025).

== Composition ==
"FutureSex/LoveSound"
A twenty-three-second sample of "FutureSex/LoveSound", a new wave song incorporating elements of industrial rock and synth-funk.

"FutureSex/LoveSound" is a new wave song incorporating elements of industrial rock and synth-funk. According to the sheet music published at Musicnotes.com by Universal Music Publishing Group, it is set in common time with a tempo of 104 beats per minute. It is composed in the key of F♯ minor, with Timberlake's vocal range spanning from the low note of A_{3} to the high note of G♯_{5}. Bernard Zuel of The Sydney Morning Herald stated Timberlake morphs into "Michael Hutchence at his most lizard-like". Spence D. of IGN described the beat as a "throwback from the future past of disco's demented dimension".

"FutureSex/LoveSound" features "an 'Another One Bites the Dust' backbeat, and progresses through spine-tingling minor changes; something close to George Michael's catchier tracks", according to Alex Burden of The Skinny. It contains a "rolling" synth bassline and "truncated" percussion that, according to Zuel, comes across as "alluring and ever-so-slightly sinister". Jamil Ahmad of MusicOMH said the song's "slow breaks" "wrap this record round you like walking into an exclusive club with a million dollar sound system – you know you are going to have one of those nights". Emily Warner of Gigwise called it a "techno 80s tinged number with keyboards, synths and a bass line reminiscent of 'Another One Bites The Dust'". Andy Gill of The Independent described it as "stalking electro R&B" and "a first cousin to 'Another One Bites the Dust'".

Linda McGee of RTÉ.ie described "FutureSex/LoveSound" as "brimming over with attitude, sharp beats and rhythm". Pitchfork's Tim Finney described the song as "suavely portentous" and as a mixture of "the carnal strut" of Nine Inch Nails' "Closer" and the "masochistic flutter" of the Junior Boys. Finney said the song "derives its charm" from its "lofty" aspirations, "like a familiar lover staging an elaborately exaggerated seduction". According to Alexis Petridis of The Guardian, "FutureSex/LoveSound" and the other opening songs of the album are heavily influenced by David Bowie's Diamond Dogs (1974). Barry Schwartz of Stylus Magazine said the song sounds "horny", which can be seen in the lines "Slide a little bit closer to me, little girl / Daddy's on a mission to please".

== Critical reception ==
Grouchy Greg Watkins of AllHipHop said "FutureSex/LoveSound" "oozes with the sexiness of George Michael's Faith era to the tune of super producer Timbaland's chest-thumping digital backbeats". Entertainment.ie described its "pulsating beat" as "both sensual and shoulder-twitching". The Warrington Guardian's Vicki Stockman wrote that Timberlake was "throwing off the boyband shackles with saucy lyrics and a killer bass". Sputnikmusic's Amanda Murray called the song "musically and melodically great" but criticized its lyrics as resembling the dialogue of a "low-rent porn film". She concluded the song establishes a pattern for the rest of FutureSex/LoveSounds: "infectiously catchy and in many cases accomplished pop music, marred by retardedly retarded lyrics". Andy Wang of Las Vegas Weekly said it "sounds like something Michael Jackson could have written five minutes after finishing 'Smooth Criminal'". Hot Press author Colm O'Hare noted parallels to Prince's 1987 song "If I Was Your Girlfriend".

In a review of FutureSex/LoveSounds, Ben Williams of New York cited the album's first five tracks, including "FutureSex/LoveSound", as updating the early 1980s Minneapolis sound: "tense drum machines, high-pitched synth squiggles and staccato funk bass lines". While reviewing the album for AllMusic, Stephen Thomas Erlewine noted the inclusion of the word "sex" in the titles of the album's first three songs: "as if mere repetition of the word will magically conjure a sex vibe, when in truth it has the opposite effect: it makes it seem that Justin is singing about it because he's not getting it". Lucy Davies of BBC Music stated: "Initially, it's difficult to listen to the lyrics of the opening tracks and give an objective opinion. It's like trying to find redeemable qualities about some guy who has zero social skills and stares at women on his own from the corner of a bar. Only [Timberlake] seems to have found some similarly unreconstructed creepy friends shouting words of encouragement to his clunky chat-up lines, like Timbaland".

In 2017, the staff of Billboard ranked "FutureSex/LoveSound" as the second-best deep cut by 21st-century pop stars, and in 2026 as the seventh-best deep cut of 2006. Writing for the same magazine, Dan Weiss called it and "Sexy Ladies" "almost-great one-riff funk vamps that connect the bone and muscle tissue of the first half".

== Credits and personnel ==
Credits are adapted from the liner notes of FutureSex/LoveSounds.

=== Locations ===
- Recorded at Thomas Crown Studios, Virginia Beach
- Mixed at The Hit Factory Criteria, Miami, FL

=== Personnel ===
- Songwriting – Justin Timberlake, Tim Mosley, Nate "Danja" Hills
- Production – Timbaland, Justin Timberlake, Nate "Danja" Hills
- Recording – Jimmy Douglass
- Mixing – Jimmy Douglas, Timbaland
- Keys – Nate "Danja" Hills
- Drums – Nate "Danja" Hills, Timbaland
- Guitar – Paul Blake
- Background vocals – Justin Timberlake

== Charts ==
Chart performance for "FutureSex/LoveSound"
Chart (2006)	Peak position
US Bubbling Under Hot 100 (Billboard)	13
