= Hurt (T.I. song) =

Single by T.I. featuring Busta Rhymes & Alfamega

from the album T.I. vs. T.I.P.
- Released: October 5, 2007
- Recorded: 2007
- Genre: Hip hop; gangsta rap
- Length: 4:50
- Label: Grand Hustle; Atlantic
- Songwriters: Clifford Harris; Trevor Tahiem Smith, Jr.; Nate Hills; Cedric Zellars
- Producer: Danja

T.I. singles chronology
"Whatever U Like" (2007)	"Hurt" (2007)	"5000 Ones" (2007)

Busta Rhymes singles chronology
"In the Ghetto" (2006)	"Hurt" (2007)	"Run the Show" (2008)

Music video
- "Hurt" on YouTube

"Hurt" is a song by American rapper T.I., released as the third official single from his fifth studio album T.I. vs. T.I.P. (2007). The hardcore hip hop song, produced by Danja, features guest appearances from fellow American rappers Busta Rhymes and Alfamega.

== Music video ==
The song's music video premiered on BET's 106 & Park on October 3, 2007. The video for "Hurt" includes cameo appearances from Grand Hustle's Young Dro, Big Kuntry King, DJ Drama, P$C, Xtaci, Maino and Yelawolf.

== In other media ==
The official remix features new verses from Trae Tha Truth and fellow Atlanta-based rapper Young Jeezy. The remix appears on the former's 2008 mixtape "The Diary of Tha Truth".

Canadian pop punk group Simple Plan used the same instrumental in their song, "Generation", which was also produced by Danja. It was included on their self-titled studio album Simple Plan, released in 2008. Some words from Simple Plan : "When we were in Miami the first time and Danja played us that beat, we wanted to use it, but he didn't know if T.I. was using it on his album. After the third time we went back, he hadn't heard back from T.I. so we started writing some stuff on it. But later he called and said he was using it. By then we liked what we had written, and T.I. didn't care." "I love what he did with it," says Comeau of T.I.'s "Hurt." "Maybe one day we'll do a mash-up."

The Montreal Canadiens use the beat to "Hurt" whenever they score a goal.

UK rapper Kano has made a freestyle over this songs instrumentals on his MC No.1 mixtape.

== Track listing ==
=== A-side ===
1. "Hurt [Explicit]"
2. "Hurt [Instrumental]"

=== B-side ===
1. "Hurt [Radio]"

== Charts ==
Chart (2007–2008)	Peak position
US Hot R&B/Hip-Hop Songs (Billboard)	89
