= Touchdown (T.I. song) =

Promotional single by T.I. featuring Eminem

from the album T.I. vs. T.I.P.
- Released: November 23, 2007
- Recorded: 2007
- Genre: Hip hop
- Length: 4:42
- Label: Grand Hustle; Atlantic
- Songwriters: Clifford Harris; Marshall Mathers; Jeffrey Bass
- Producers: Eminem; Jeff Bass (add.)

T.I. chronology
"For a Minute" (2007)	"Touchdown" (2007)	"No Matter What" (2008)

Eminem singles chronology
"Jimmy Crack Corn" (2007)	"Touchdown" (2007)	"Crack a Bottle" (2009)

"Touchdown" is a song by American rapper T.I., taken from his fifth studio album T.I. vs. T.I.P. (2007). The song features vocals from American rapper Eminem, who also produced the song alongside his frequent collaborator Jeff Bass. The song, although not officially released as a single, received considerable airplay on the radio, as well as on Monday Night Football during the 2007 NFL season.

== Music and lyrics ==
Produced by Eminem and Jeff Bass, the song features the use of electronic keyboard giving a trumpet-like sound. As well, hi-hats and bass drums are the main rhythmic instruments used in the song.

The song mainly deals with the success of the T.I. and Eminem, as well as their struggle with their respective alter egos "T.I.P." and "Slim Shady". Eminem raps imitating a Southern American accent, typical of T.I. and his hometown Atlanta (Eminem is from Detroit). Also, in the third and last verse T.I. explains his gratitude toward hip hop and criticizes people that disagree with the lyrical content of the music genre:

How could they be so ignorant? Look what hip hop done brung [sic] us
It's allowed us to run a business, legitimated our moneys
Got us out of the ghettos and relocated our mommies
I made it all the way here ain't no way you taking it from me
So excuse me Oprah honey, I'm sorry, really I promise
But niggas, bitches and hoes do exist, I'm just being honest.

In 2009, Eminem later stated he feels his verse on the song was "horrible".

== Track listing ==
No.	Title	Writer(s)	Producer(s)	Length
1.	"Touchdown" (feat. Eminem)	Clifford Harris; Marshall Mathers; Jeffrey Bass	Eminem; Jeff Bass^{[a]}	4:42

Notes

- ^{^[a]} signifies an additional producer.

== Charts ==
Chart (2007)	Peak position
US Bubbling Under Hot 100 Singles (Billboard)	9
US Pop Airplay (Billboard)	96
