= You Know What It Is =

Single by T.I. featuring Wyclef Jean

from the album T.I. vs. T.I.P.
- Released: July 10, 2007 (U.S.)
- Recorded: 2007
- Genre: Hip hop; reggae fusion
- Length: 3:45 (radio edit); 4:48 (album version)
- Label: Grand Hustle; Atlantic
- Songwriters: Clifford Harris; Jerry Duplessis; Wyclef Jean
- Producers: Wyclef Jean; Jerry "Wonda" Duplessis; Sedeck "All Hands on Deck" Jean; Keith "Lil Wonda" Duplessis

T.I. singles chronology
"Big Things Poppin' (Do It)" (2007)	"You Know What It Is" (2007)	"Whatever U Like" (2007)

Wyclef Jean singles chronology
"Five-O" (2007)	"You Know What It Is" (2007)	"Sweetest Girl (Dollar Bill)" (2007)

"You Know What It Is" is a song by American rapper T.I., released July 10, 2007, as the second single from his fifth studio album T.I. vs. T.I.P. (2007). The song was produced by Jerry "Wonda" Duplessis and Wyclef Jean, the latter of whom contributes vocals throughout the hip hop track. The single peaked at number 34 on the US Billboard Hot 100.

== Music video ==
The song's music video was filmed in Miami, by director and friend Chris Robinson. On June 12, the video was made available on iTunes. The video premiered MTV's TRL on June 14, 2007. The video features cameo appearances from B.G., Kymani Marley, and P$C.

== Chart performance ==
"You Know What It Is" debuted at number 73 on the US Hot R&B/Hip Hop Songs on the chart dated June 28, 2007. The song later managed to peak at number 11. On the chart dated July 21, 2007, the single debuted at number 68 on the US Billboard Hot 100. The song eventually peaked at number 34 on the chart and spent a total of 18 weeks.

== Track listing ==
=== Promo CD single ===
1. "You Know What It Is" (Clean Version)
2. "You Know What It Is" (Dirty Version)
3. "You Know What It Is" (Instrumental)

=== Vinyl single ===
1. "You Know What It Is" (Radio Version)
2. "You Know What It Is" (Amended Version)
3. "You Know What It Is" (Instrumental)
4. "You Know What It Is" (Explicit version)
5. "You Know What It Is" (Acapella)

== Charts ==
=== Weekly charts ===
Chart (2007)	Peak position
US Billboard Hot 100	34
US Hot R&B/Hip-Hop Songs (Billboard)	11
US Hot Rap Songs (Billboard)	5
US Rhythmic Airplay (Billboard)	9

=== Year-end charts ===
Chart (2007)	Position
US Hot R&B/Hip-Hop Songs (Billboard)	73
