= I'm Back (song) =

Single by T.I.

from the album No Mercy
- Released: March 8, 2010
- Genre: Hip hop
- Length: 3:39
- Label: Grand Hustle; Atlantic
- Songwriters: Harris, Jr., Dexter Randall, Demetri Duncan, Charles Bobino III, Otha "Vakseen" Davis III
- Producer: TrackSlayerz

T.I. singles chronology
"Hell of a Life" (2009)	"I'm Back" (2010)	"Hello Good Morning" (2010)

"I'm Back" is a song by American hip hop recording artist T.I., taken from his seventh studio album No Mercy (2010). The song, produced by TrackSlayerz, was released as the album's first single on March 8, 2010. The single was nominated for a Grammy Award for Best Rap Solo Performance, at the 53rd Annual Grammy Awards, but lost to Eminem's "Not Afraid"

== Background ==
Atlantic Records announced the release of the single on March 1, 2010, followed by the release of the cover art on March 3, 2010. T.I. released the song through his website on March 8, 2010. The song was available on iTunes the following day. The song was included as a bonus track on the iTunes and Amazon MP3 deluxe edition.

The production duo, TrackSlayerz, who were credited for the song's production described the song as "T.I. swatting at haters and assuming his rightful position atop the game after spending time behind bars."

== Music video ==
A teaser for the music video was released by T.I. via YouTube on April 20, 2010. The video, directed by TAJ, was released on T.I.'s website on April 26, 2010.

== Charts ==
On the week ending April 3, 2010, "I'm Back" debuted at #44 on the Billboard Hot 100.

=== Weekly charts ===
Chart (2010)	Peak position
Canada Hot 100 (Billboard)	44
Germany (German Black Chart)	29
US Billboard Hot 100	44
US Hot R&B/Hip-Hop Songs (Billboard)	12
US Hot Rap Songs (Billboard)	7

=== Year-end charts ===
Chart (2010)	Position
US Hot R&B/Hip-Hop Songs (Billboard)	53
