= No Matter What (T.I. song) =

Single by T.I.

from the album Paper Trail
- Released: April 29, 2008
- Recorded: December 2007 – January 2008
- Genre: Hip hop
- Length: 5:16
- Label: Grand Hustle; Atlantic
- Songwriters: Clifford Harris, Jr.; Nathaniel Hills
- Producer: Danja

T.I. singles chronology
"Touchdown" (2007)	"No Matter What" (2008)	"I'll Be Lovin' U Long Time" (remix) (2008)

Audio sample
- file; help

Music video
- "No Matter What" on YouTube

"No Matter What" is a song by American recording artist T.I., from his sixth album Paper Trail. It was released as the album's first single on April 29, 2008, with its eventual release onto the iTunes Store on May 6. The song was nominated at the 2008 MTV Video Music Awards for Best Male Video. The song ranked 10 in Rolling Stone's list of 2008's best songs.

== Music video ==
The video was shot in Atlanta. The music video was released on June 27 on MTV's FN Premieres and on July 2 on BET's 106 & Park. The video was nominated for "Best Male Video" for the 2008 MTV Video Music Awards, but lost to Chris Brown's "With You" video. The video's theme revolved around the loss of loved ones and the feeling of being locked behind bars. Directed by Mazik Self who is based in Los Angeles.

== Charts ==
Chart (2008)	Peak position
Canada Hot 100 (Billboard)	66
US Billboard Hot 100	72
US Hot R&B/Hip-Hop Songs (Billboard)	42
US Hot Rap Songs (Billboard)	17

== Remixes ==
- Nicki Minaj did a freestyle for DJ Drama & Lil Wayne's Dedication 3 and which is also on her third mixtape Beam Me Up Scotty (mixtape).
- There is also a remix with a verse from Yung Joc.
