= T.I. vs. T.I.P. =

Studio album by T.I.
- Released: July 3, 2007
- Genre: Hip hop
- Length: 72:44
- Labels: Grand Hustle; Atlantic
- Producers: Clifford "T.I." Harris; Kannon "Caviar" Cross; Just Blaze; Mannie Fresh; Lil' C; Wyclef Jean; Jerry 'Wonder' Duplessis; Sedeck "All Hands on Deck" Jean; Keith "Lil' Wonda" Duplessis; Kevin "Khao" Cates; Bao Quoc Pham; Steve Holdren; Nate "Danja" Hills; The Runners; Tony Galvin; Eminem; Jeff Bass; Keith Mack; Timbaland

T.I. chronology
King (2006)	T.I. vs. T.I.P. (2007)	Paper Trail (2008)

Singles from T.I. vs. T.I.P.
- 1. "Big Things Poppin' (Do It)" Released: May 29, 2007; 2. "You Know What It Is" Released: July 10, 2007; 3. "Hurt" Released: October 5, 2007

T.I. vs. T.I.P. is the fifth studio album by American rapper T.I., released on July 3, 2007 through Grand Hustle Records and Atlantic Records. Recording sessions for the album took a year and a half to record towards early 2007, as T.I. stated and confirmed in an interview with MTV News. Production was handled by several record producers, including Kannon "Caviar" Cross, Just Blaze, Mannie Fresh, Lil' C, Wyclef Jean, Jerry 'Wonder' Duplessis, Sedeck "All Hands on Deck" Jean, Keith "Lil' Wonda" Duplessis, Kevin "Khao" Cates, Timbaland, Bao Quoc Pham, Steve Holdren, Nate "Danja" Hills, The Runners, Tony Galvin, Eminem, Jeff Bass, and Keith Mack, among others. Notably, it is also his first album not to feature production from his frequent collaborator DJ Toomp.

Upon its release, T.I. vs. T.I.P. received mixed reviews from music critics, but was a commercial success, debuting at number one on the US Billboard 200 chart and selling over 470,000 copies in its first week. It also achieved nearly respectable international chart placements, produced three singles that attained chart success (including the lead single "Big Things Poppin' (Do It)"), and was certified platinum by the Recording Industry Association of America (RIAA). T.I. vs. T.I.P. was nominated for a Grammy Award for Best Rap Album, losing to Kanye West's Graduation at the 50th Annual Grammy Awards. The album won the American Music Award for Favorite Rap/Hip-Hop Album at the American Music Awards of 2007, with T.I. also winning the American Music Award for Favorite Rap/Hip-Hop Artist that year.

== Background ==
Shortly after the release and major success of his 2006 efforts (his big screen acting debut ATL and his critically acclaimed fourth studio album King), T.I.'s friend, personal assistant, and an employee of his Grand Hustle Records, Philant Johnson was shot dead after a nightclub brawl between T.I.'s entourage and some Cincinnati thugs. After Johnson's death, T.I. mentioned that the business of rapping no longer felt good and admitted that he was seriously considering quitting music altogether. In the leaflet included with the album, T.I. dedicates the album to Philant "Big Phil" Johnson as well as his daughters Leiah Amoré Harris (who was born stillborn) and Deyjah Princess Harris; his three sons Messiah, Domani, and King Harris, and the mother of his children Tameka "Tiny" Cottle.

== Recording ==
On March 19, 2007, via phone from Atlanta with MTV News, T.I. revealed some of the album's collaborators. T.I. stated that he was anticipating going in recording with Eminem. He also stated that he and Eminem had a hot concept that they spoke about over the phone. T.I. stated "It's gonna be on some real creative shit. JT, Justin Timberlake, we're just waiting on the proper song to get him on my album as well." That's just the beginning, the two-time Grammy Award winner said that he had about 60 songs in the can and will again be working right up to the deadline to turn the album in. T.I. stated that he was working with everybody who he had an opportunity to work with, he added, He confirmed that he was working with Timbaland working with Danja Timbaland protégé Nate Hills on that same day. Scott Storch, Mannie Fresh, and he stated that Wyclef Jean came through with some real worldly music and great vocals. Nelly, Lil Wayne, R. Kelly. T.I. stated that he reached out to R&B singer Ciara.

He confirmed that Akon had contributed to the album, along with most of the Grand Hustle Records producers including Kevin "Khao" Cates, Black Mob and others. T.I. confirmed that Just Blaze, did a song called 'Help Is Coming.' T.I. stated that the song was basically talking about how they say the industry is suffering. Well, help is on the way. Fret not." T.I. vs. T.I.P. is undoubtedly the film/mic star's most conceptual album to date. T.I. is the persona we hear in songs like "My Love" and "Why You Wanna". T.I.P., on the other hand, takes care of the much more gutter material like "Bring Em Out" and "You Don't Know Me". T.I. stated that the LP would give you doses of T.I. and T.I.P. solo records as well as the two collaborating on the same track. There will be interlude's throughout the LP, telling a story — and don't be surprised if more than one single from the project is released at once. T.I. stated "I'm not just making an album, I'm making f---in' opera here," he chuckled. With such a high concept, he says that he's making sure to take extra time and critique every song to be sure he doesn't lose anyone, it'd be easy for me to go over people's heads," he rationalized. "Sometime people might see me act a certain way one time and another way one another time. They might not believe the same cat you see dressed so sharp and winning awards and speaking eloquently is the same cat you see fist-fighting with hoodlums outside a nightclub. This album will be an explanation of all of this" he states.

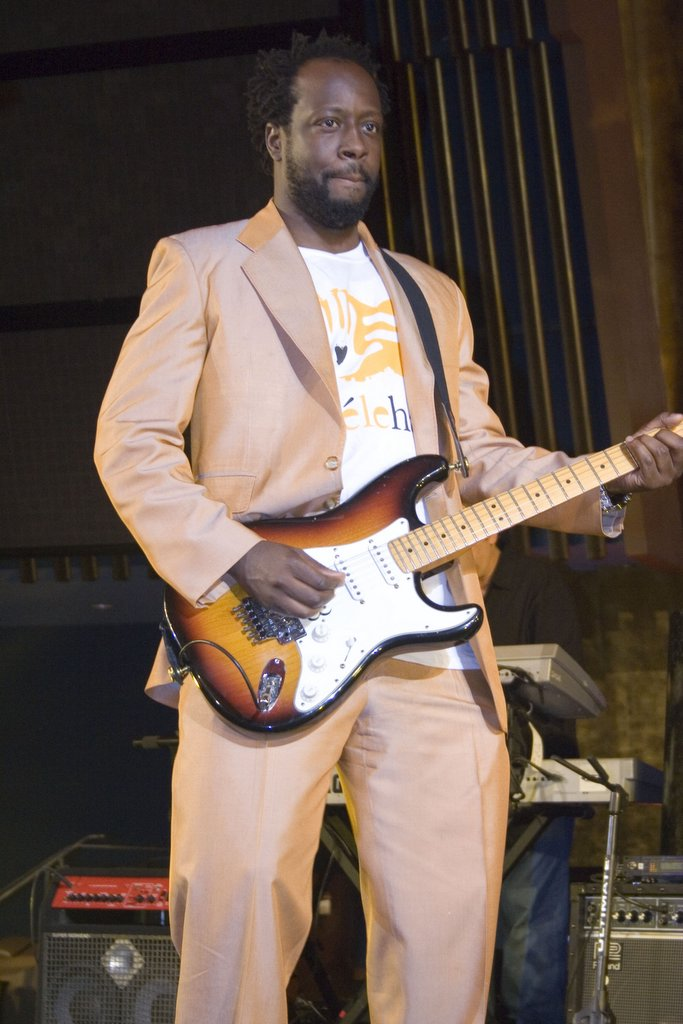
Wyclef Jean appeared and produced two songs on the album.

On April 12, 2007 T.I. stated that he was just about done with his T.I. vs. T.I.P. album. He's stated already that he recorded with Eminem, Nelly and Ciara among other guest stars, and the first single is ready to hit radio, officially debuting April 17, 2007 the song is another collaboration for the King of the South and Mannie Fresh and was called "Big Things Poppin' " — the clean version of the record, anyway. T.I. stated "Big Shit Poppin' is really just him talking to these people who say things and can't back it up," T.I. said, referring to the song's title as it will probably appear on the album. Mannie Fresh stated that he and T.I. clique up and the songs are magic, who's was in Atlanta working on a bunch of LPs that T.I. was overseeing, like B.G.'s new album. T.I.P. even has co-production credit on "Big Things Poppin'". The songs we're doing for his album are definitely right, yes indeed Mannie Fresh added. The beat Mannie Fresh and his accomplice came up with is another energetic brouhaha in step with some of their proven street ditties such as "Top Back". One of the more recent sessions he held for the album was with Eminem, someone who has his own dual-identity issues. T.I. stated that it was an experience, about working with Eminem. T.I. also stated that Eminem is probably one of the most lyrical cats in the game right now. T.I. stated being known as one of the most lyrical cats in the game, he stated that he had to get himself up. also stating He lived up to all his expectations. He's a rappin' fool. T.I. stated that Eminem made him step his game up. T.I. stated that he did three records with Eminem. T.I. said that he did one for him. You know how Marshall Mathers and Slim Shady have their beefs? Well on that song, T.I. is trying to tell Marshall how to deal with Slim based on how he deals with Tip. Then Tip butts in, like, 'You can't tell nobody nothing.' Then Em comes in and tells me, 'Who are you to tell me anything?' I was like, 'I'm just trying to help, homie, T.I. added. Their other two collaborations could end up on T.I. vs. T.I.P., including a song called "Touchdown".

T.I. also stated it's out of Eminem's norm, if Eminem has a norm," T.I. said of the track. T.I. stated it's a record you wouldn't expect to hear him on, kinda like how you heard him on 'Smack That' for Akon or [Em's] 'Shake That' with Nate Dogg. You'll be like, 'OK, he's switching it up.' ['Touchdown' is] basically [him] talking about when you touch down in everybody's city, what you do. Hit the mall, buy a car or leave the club with all the girls. We have yet to finish that one. T.I. stated the one we finished is 'Whatever You Want It to Be,' " he added. "It's saying, 'I'm a man, if I ain't nothing else. Before I'm a rapper, before I'm anything else, I'm a man. If you don't respect that, it can be whatever you want it to be.' The producer Tip went the most in-depth with for this project, however, was — of all people — Wyclef Jean. It has yet to be determined if all their records will make the cut, but two front-runners are "Swagger" and "U Know What It Is". T.I. stated that you can quote me," Tip burst out with a grin. " 'U Know What It Is' will tear the clubs up this summer." T.I. stated that he and Wyclef got together over a weekend, he explained about the collaborations. "We wasn't on each other's itinerary to work with each other. He hit me one day when I was in L.A. and was like, 'I gotta come to Atlanta. You got anywhere I can record?, T.I. graciously turned over the main room in his studio and it was on from there. T.I. came home about a day into Wyclef's sessions and immediately started snatching up tracks for himself. T.I. stated he started pulling up beats and he was like, 'Who is that for?' He said, 'You, if you want it.' We wound up knocking seven songs from Friday to Monday. It's just us having a good time. We just bonded, T.I. added.

Show It 2 Me," which features Nelly, sounds like it could easily be a sequel to their previous teaming on Urban Legend's "Get Loose." The two go back and forth at points and Nelly uses an old-school flow like UTFO on "Roxanne Roxanne." Lil Wayne appears on "Yeah" and drops lines such as, "I'm flyer than a vampire. T.I. also stated Andre 3000 could also possibly check in, on a song called "Life of the Party." On that track, Tip talks about maturity, why he's now "too grown to be the life of the party," and how he has no time to argue with bouncers, overzealous fans or pestering playa haters. On May 16, 2007 T.I. stated that he was putting the final touches on his forthcoming personality-splitting project, T.I. vs. T.I.P.

== Music ==
=== Concept ===
T.I. vs. T.I.P. is a concept LP on which the rapper uses both sides of himself — the suave, level-minded CEO and the 'hood-friendly former dope boy — to express his thoughts on everything from the Grammy Awards to sideways-talking bustas to making dough. Sometimes the two sides duel, and occasionally you'll catch them on the same track. More often than not, though, each personality gets his own song. "Big Shit Poppin'" showcases the Grammy winner rapping in his grittier T.I.P. persona. Dominated '06 and I'm going right back," he rhymes. T.I.P. also says he's "doing it" for his children, family and friends. On March 1, 2007 T.I. stated that all the albums prior to this one, T.I.P. would work harder to make the album, T.I. would work harder to sell it," he said. On T.I. vs. T.I.P. — a conceptual LP about his life — they battle each other on six tracks. Another third of the project is dedicated solely to T.I. and the remainder goes to T.I.P. "This is my life, this is the struggle I had to go through to bring myself to release another album," said T.I., who lost both his newborn daughter and personal assistant within the last year. "After all the stuff I went through following the success of King, it took a lot to even muster the effort or even care enough about the world outside my circle to even care about doing another album. "All I did was take notes and record it along the way," T.I. reflected.

== Release and promotion ==
=== Promo singles ===
"Touchdown" was the first and only official promotional single to be released from T.I. vs. T.I.P.. The single entered the Bubbling Under Hot 100 Singles chart at number 9, and it charted at number 96 on the Pop 100 chart. The song was only released as an airplay single in 2007, and not as an official single, it featured Eminem. It received considerable airplay on Monday Night Football during the 2007 NFL season. The song was Produced by Eminem and Jeff Bass, the song features the use of electronic keyboard giving a trumpet-like sound. As well, hi-hats and bass drums are the main rhythmic instruments used in the song.

=== Singles ===
"Big Things Poppin' (Do It)" was the first official single to be released from T.I. vs. T.I.P.. The single entered the Billboard Hot 100 at number 9, it charted at number 7 on the Hot R&B/Hip-Hop Songs chart, it charted at number 2 on the Hot Rap Tracks chart, it charted at number 20 on the Pop 100 chart, it charted at number 8 on the Hot Digital Songs, it charted at number 34 on the Hot Ringtones chart, and at number 9 on the Rhythmic Top 40 chart. The song was #66 on Rolling Stone's list of the 100 Best Songs of 2007. The Recording Industry Association of America certified the single Gold. The single attained respectable international charting. In Canada the single entered the Canadian Singles Chart at number 75, in Japan the single entered the Japanese Singles Chart at number 5, and in New Zealand the single entered the New Zealand Singles Chart at number 8. The Recording Industry Association of New Zealand certified the single Gold on August 23, 2009, selling over 7,500 copies. The song was written by T.I. and produced by Mannie Fresh. The single was released on May 29. The clean version of the song is called "Big Things Poppin' (Do It)". The single samples a guitar riff from the song, "Top Gun Anthem," the theme of the film Top Gun. "Big Things Poppin' (Do It)" is used with alternative lyrics as the theme song to an ESPN SportsCenter special known as the "Who's Now?" series, which was aired throughout the summer of 2007. This song is featured in the multiplayer online casual rhythm game DANCE! Online. The song is used in the Wayans Brothers 2009 parody film Dance Flick.

"You Know What It Is" was the second official single from the album. The single entered the Billboard Hot 100 at number 34, it charted at number 11 on the Hot R&B/Hip-Hop Songs chart, it charted at number 5 on the Hot Rap Tracks chart, it charted at number 62 on the Pop 100 chart, it charted at number 48 on the Hot Digital Songs, and at number 9 on the Rhythmic Top 40 chart. In Canada the single entered the Canadian Singles Chart at number 61. The song was written by T.I. and produced by Wyclef Jean. The song was featured in the HBO series Entourage (Season 4, Episode 4) as the guys are in a club, it can be heard in the background.

"Hurt" was the third and final official single from the album. The single entered the Hot R&B/Hip-Hop Songs chart at number 89, and at number 8 on the Hot Rap Tracks chart. The single features Busta Rhymes and newcoming Grand Hustle artist Alfamega. Production comes from Danja, which utilized horns for the song structure. The song did not do well due to lack of promotion caused by the arrest of T.I. Alfamega and Busta Rhymes performed the song at the BET Hip Hop Awards. Also at the Awards, the video for the song was nominated.

== Critical reception ==
Professional ratings
Aggregate scores
Source	Rating
Metacritic	61/100
Review scores
Source	Rating
AllMusic	3/5 stars
The A.V. Club	C+
Entertainment Weekly	(B)
Okayplayer	4/5 stars
Pitchfork Media	(6.4/10)
PopMatters	(7/10)
Rolling Stone	3/5 stars
Stylus Magazine	(C)
Tiny Mix Tapes	2/5 stars
XXL	3/5 stars

Upon its release, T.I. vs. T.I.P. received mixed reviews from music critics. It holds a score of 61 out of 100 on Metacritic, indicating generally favorable reviews from critics. AllMusic writer Andy Kellman gave the album a 3 out of 5 stars stating "the MC constructs an entire album around the penthouse and pavement concept, dividing the program into three acts: T.I.P. (seven tracks), T.I. (seven tracks), and T.I. vs T.I.P. (four tracks). This is also signified in the album's outer sleeve and booklet photos. After the sustained greatness through Trap Muzik, Urban Legend, and King, a fall-off of some degree had to be expected -- especially after reaching the top after a steady climb -- and that's exactly what happens. Though he undeniably remains one of the top MCs, T.I. tends to either reheat familiar material with less fire or tread dangerously close to unrelatable Kingdom Come-like "Look at who's obnoxiously shedding his underdog status!" routines (as on "My Swag"). The productions similarly do not match up to past successes, and even some of obvious choices for singles fall short of past tracks that were never thought to be released as singles. The album is generally enjoyable, and it's doubtful T.I. has to worry about being dethroned within the near future." Nathan Rabin of The A.V. Club stated "T.I.'s honey-dripping Southern drawl and outlaw swagger is irresistible in bite-sized doses, but it isn't enough to sustain an entire album. This holds true for his ambitious yet muddled new project, T.I. Vs. T.I.P, a three-act concept album that clocks in at just over 73 minutes. Sonically, the album has a frantic, indistinct busyness that all too often passes for excitement and momentum. The album's first third concentrates on T.I.P., the second on T.I., and the third on an epic battle between the rapper and his flamboyant alter ego. T.I.P. is ostensibly T.I.'s belligerent, untamed id, but in a blind taste test, nine out of 10 hip-hop heads would have difficulty telling them apart. In the grand hustling tradition of half-assed concept albums, Vs. boasts an overarching premise that's fuzzy to the point of meaninglessness until the climactic final confrontation. On Vs., one of the South's hottest rappers declares war with his dark side. Maybe next time he'll finally wage combat with a more worthwhile adversary, like bloated album lengths or the homogenizing effects of major-label politics."

Neil Drumming of Entertainment Weekly stated "The Atlanta native breaks his fifth album, T.I. vs. T.I.P., into three acts depicting an ideological battle between split personae: the irascible thug T.I.P. and the nouveau-riche recording artist T.I. It ain't Shakespeare, but the dual protagonists make for an intriguing bout." Tom Breihan of Pitchfork Media noted "T.I.'s new album, T.I. vs. T.I.P. operates on the thin and dubious concept that T.I. the businessman and T.I.P. the unreformed hustler are two completely different entities, and that the strain of balancing the two personas is enough to tear Clifford Joseph Harris Jr. apart. Apparently, those two sides aren't as indivisible as they once seemed. T.I. first explored this dichotomy on Trap Muzik's "T.I. vs. T.I.P.", crafting an argument that movingly dramatized his internal struggle. That struggle also serves as the concept for the new album: T.I.P. gets the first seven tracks, T.I. the next seven, and the two sides spend the last four songs hashing out their differences. It's an interesting conceit, but it doesn't really work as a hook for an entire album, and the record's exhaustingly long running time pushes the conceit far past the breaking point. For one thing, it's a pacing disaster; by lining up all his sugary for-the-ladies tracks in a row, T.I. leaves a long dead-streak in the second half of the album. For another, it plays against his strengths. His music works best when both sides of his personality are allowed to co-exist in the same track. When they're separated, they both sound emaciated and half-formed. And he never quite commits to the concept. If T.I. represents the rapper's pop half, why do the album's first two singles come from the T.I.P. section? If the album's final stretch is meant to unite both sides, why do they confront each other in song only once, on the second verse of "Respect My Hustle"? Even if the concept falls flat, though, T.I. vs. T.I.P. still warrants a listen, if only because T.I. seems constitutionally incapable of releasing an album full of uncompelling music. As a rapper, he's still a dominant voice; his slurry, guttural drawl is a great instrument, and always keeps it deep in the track's pocket, occasionally whipping out tricky double-time patterns or murmuring singsong melodies. The album is perhaps best heard in chunks; only a few of these songs wouldn't sound great on shuffle. Heard as a piece, though, the album's momentum sputters and dies more than once; after a few consecutive listens, T.I. sounds dour and joyless, like he's just punching the clock. T.I. vs. T.I.P. may be self-obsessed and self-indulgent, but maybe T.I. needed to make this album to keep himself interested. Let's hope he's gotten it out of his system."

Colin McGuire of PopMatters states "Here, he overshadows any work he has previously done by keeping his Southern hip-hop roots intact while putting just enough attention on the hooks that one could easily find half of these songs that paint T.I. vs. T.I.P's canvas on your favorite Hot 100 radio station. And he does it better than he has ever been able to do it before. Harris has come a long way from initially snapping back as the rubber band man. And now, with another hip-hop masterpiece under his belt, maybe Cohen can have a laugh himself as well." Ian Cohen of Stylus Magazine stated "The biggest failing of T.I. vs. T.I.P.: though his singles are obsessed with knowledge of self and others, during the span of a seemingly endless album that centers around an identity crisis, T.I. mostly fails to realize the difference between introspection and self-absorption. It's more of a hastily assembled construct grafted onto the persona of a generic trap star who doesn't seem capable of taking real artistic chances. In his mind, anyone who criticizes T.I. is "just another hater who's broke again," waiting for some backpacker epiphany that will never come, like Little Brother becoming commercially relevant or Freddie Foxxx coming out of hiding to lyrically knuckle this guy down. It's like T.I.'s been speaking in code to us all along: What you know about that? You know what it is. You don't know me. But you know what? After spending hours with T.I. vs. T.I.P. chasm-like emptiness, I can't see why anyone would care." Nick Marx of Tiny Mix Tapes noted "After reaching his creative apex, is there a more predictable and plodding step down for an artist than a concept album? Did anyone even know (or care) that the two iterations of Clifford Harris' moniker represent, respectively, his business and street sides? T.I. vs T.I.P. is mercifully light on the requisite skits illustrating its dichotomy, but you almost wish there were more of them to explain the album's weird alchemy of simultaneously overwrought and undercooked production and flaccid, self-absorbed lyricism." Brendan Frederick of XXL Magazine notes "Atlanta rapper Clifford Harris opened this old wound four years ago on "T.I. vs. T.I.P.," a highlight from his sophomore opus, Trap Muzik, where T.I.P., his reckless, shit-talking core, battled T.I., the consummate professional/smooth operator. After a tumultuous 2006 filled with highs (King solidified his place as one of hip-hop's illuminati) and lows (the senseless murder of his best friend), Tip re-examines his schizophrenic psyche on his fifth album, T.I. vs. T.I.P. Call it trap therapy. Hopefully, someday we'll find out what really makes T.I. tick."

=== Accolades ===
At the 50th Annual Grammy Awards, T.I. was nominated with a total of three nominations, including Grammy Award for Best Rap Album, Grammy Award for Best Rap Solo Performance and Grammy Award for Best Rap Song for the single "Big Shit Poppin' (Do It)". The album won T.I. the American Music Award for Favorite Rap/Hip-Hop Album at The American Music Awards of 2007. T.I. also won the American Music Award for Favorite Rap/Hip-Hop Artist at The American Music Awards of 2007.

== Commercial performance ==
T.I. vs. T.I.P. debuted at number one on the US Billboard 200, selling 470,000 copies in its first week of release, according to Nielsen SoundScan. This become T.I.'s second consecutive US number-one debut and his fourth US top-ten album. The album also charted at number one on the Top R&B/Hip-Hop Albums and the Top Rap Albums charts. In its second week, the album remained at number one on the chart, selling an additional 185,000 copies. In its third week, the album slipped to number three on the chart, selling 94,000 more copies. In its fourth week, the album slipped to number five on the chart, selling 65,000 more copies. On August 30, 2007, the album was certified platinum by the Recording Industry Association of America for selling over a million copies in the United States.

In Canada, the album entered the Canadian Albums Chart at number seven, in France the album entered the French Albums Chart at number 108, in Japan the album entered the Japanese Albums Chart at number 21, in New Zealand the album entered the New Zealand Albums Chart at number 37, and in Switzerland the album entered the Swiss Albums Chart at number 59. In Canada, the Canadian Recording Industry Association certified the album gold for sales of over 50,000 copies in Canada.

== Track listing ==
T.I. vs. T.I.P. track listing
No.	Title	Writer(s)	Producer(s)	Length
1.	"Act I: T.I.P."		T.I.; Kannon "Caviar" Cross; Corey "OZ" Simon; Just Blaze^{[a]}	2:22
2.	"Big Shit Poppin' (Do It)"	Clifford Harris; Byron Thomas	Mannie Fresh	4:47
3.	"Raw"	Harris; Cordale Quinn	Lil' C	3:51
4.	"You Know What It Is" (featuring Wyclef Jean)	Wyclef Jean; Jerry Duplessis; Sedeck Jean; Harris	Wyclef Jean; Jerry "Wonda" Duplessis; Sedeck "All Hands On Deck" Jean; Keith "Lil Wonda" Duplessis	4:47
5.	"Da Dopeman"	Harris; Thomas; O'Shea Jackson; Andre Young	Mannie Fresh	5:09
6.	"Watch What You Say to Me" (featuring Jay-Z)	Harris; Kevin Cates; Shawn Carter	Kevin "Khao" Cates; Bao Quoc Pham^{[b]}; Steven Holdren^{[b]}	4:45
7.	"Hurt" (featuring Alfa Mega and Busta Rhymes)	Harris; Nathaniel Hill; Trevor Smith; Cedric Zellars	Danja	4:50
8.	"Act II: T.I."		T.I.; Kannon "Caviar" Cross; Corey "OZ" Simon; Just Blaze^{[a]}	1:46
9.	"Help Is Coming"	Harris; Justin Smith; Barry White	Just Blaze	4:25
10.	"My Swag" (featuring Wyclef Jean)	Harris; W. Jean; J. Duplessis; S. Jean	Wyclef Jean; Jerry "Wonda" Duplessis; Sedeck "All Hands On Deck" Jean; Keith "Lil Wonda" Duplessis	4:34
11.	"We Do This"	Harris; Andrew Harr; Jermaine Jackson	The Runners	3:33
12.	"Show It to Me" (featuring Nelly)	Harris; Tony Galvin; Cornell Haynes Jr.	Tony Galvin	3:18
13.	"Don't You Wanna Be High"	Harris; Harr; Jackson	The Runners	3:59
14.	"Touchdown" (featuring Eminem)	Harris; Marshall Mathers; Jeff Bass	Eminem; Jeff Bass	4:42
15.	"Act III: T.I. vs T.I.P. The Confrontation"		T.I.; Kannon "Caviar" Cross; Corey "OZ" Simon; Just Blaze^{[a]}	1:46
16.	"Tell 'Em I Said That"	Harris; Hill	Danja	4:54
17.	"Respect This Hustle"	Harris; Hill	Danja	4:26
18.	"My Type"	Harris; Keith McMasters	Keith Mack	4:50
Total length:				72:44

Bonus tracks
No.	Title	Writer(s)	Producer(s)	Length
19.	"The Hottest" (featuring Mac Boney)	Harris; Cates; Nathaniel Josey	Cates	3:34
20.	"No Sweat" (featuring Big Kuntry King & J.R. Get Money)	Harris; Keith McMasters	Keith Mack	4:42
21.	"You Ain't Fly"		Just Blaze	3:47
22.	"Hustlin'" (featuring Governor)	Harris; Governor Washington, Jr.; Maurice Sinclair	Big Reese	3:21

Notes

- ^{^[a]} signifies an additional producer.
- ^{^[b]} signifies a co-producer.

Sample credits

- "Da Dopeman" contains excerpts and elements from "Dopeman (Remix)" as performed by N.W.A..
- "Help Is Coming" contains elements from of "Somebody's Gonna Off the Man" as performed by Barry White.

== Exclusives ==
T.I. released his Bonus DVD to T.I. vs. T.I.P. This DVD is only in exclusive double-pack in BET Edition available at Wal-Mart or Sam's in its edited version.

DVD features are:

- ACCESS GRANTED: "Big Things Poppin"
- 106 & PARK: T.I. Interview
- 2006 HIP-HOP AWARDS: "Top Back" Performance
- BET PROMO: T.I. Exposure

Music Videos:

- "Rubberband Man"
- "Big Things Poppin'"
- "Hurt'"

Target released an exclusive as well, including a bonus DVD which featured T.I. vs. T.I.P.: Conflict Resolution a full version of the therapy T.I. and T.I.P. receive in many of the commercials.

== Personnel ==
Credits for T.I. vs. T.I.P. adapted from Allmusic.

- Wilner Alexandre – assistant engineer
- Jamaal Andrews – bass
- Elvis Aponte – assistant engineer
- Marcella "Ms. Lago" Araica – engineer, mixing
- Jeff Bass – producer
- Leslie Brathwaite – mixing
- David Brown – tracking
- James Burk – piano
- Tony Campana – engineer
- Elliott Carter – engineer, producer
- Kevin Cates – producer
- Lyor Cohen – vocals
- Kannon "Caviar" Cross – producer
- Mike DeSalvo – engineer
- Jerry Duplessis – percussion, producer
- Keith "Lil Wonda" Duplessis – producer
- Eminem – mixing, producer
- Mannie Fresh – producer
- Lanre Gaba – A&R
- Tony Galvin – arranger, keyboards, producer, programming
- Chris Gehringer – mastering
- Jason Geter – A&R, executive producer, vocals
- Robert Gold – photo production
- Julie Greenwald – vocals
- Patrick Hoeck – photography
- Steven Holdren – producer
- Brad "Dirt" Horne – engineer
- Sedeck Jean – instrumentation, producer
- Wyclef Jean – producer
- Just Blaze – producer, vocals
- Hannah Kang – A&R
- Gimel "Young Guru" Katon – mixing
- Michael Kyser – vocals
- Kevin "Coach K" Lee – co–executive producer, A&R
- Lil' C – producer
- Kevin Liles – vocals
- James Lopez – marketing consultant
- Lex Lucazi – piano
- Keith Mack – producer
- Orlando McGhee – A&R
- Dennis D-moe moorehead – Keyboards
- Douglas Peterson – A&R
- Charles Pettaway – strings
- Bao Quoc Pham – producer
- Sara Pine – photo production
- Joel Powell – bass
- Luis Resto – keyboards
- Terrell Sass – drums, organ
- Ray Seay – mixing
- Corey "Oz" Simon – producer
- Marsha St. Hubert – A&R
- Rawle Stewart – co–executive producer
- T.I. – producer, executive producer
- Byron Thomas – drums, engineer
- Justin Trawick – mixing assistant
- Joe Warlick – engineer
- Idris "Baby Shaq" Washington – assistant
- Ryan West – bass, tracking, vocals
- Shane "Bermy" Woodley – engineer
- Andrew Wright – engineer
- Howard Wright – engineer, producer

== Charts ==
=== Weekly charts ===
Weekly chart performance for T.I. vs. T.I.P.
Chart (2007)	Peak position
Canada Top Albums/CDs (RPM)	7
Dutch Albums (Album Top 100)	92
French Albums (SNEP)	108
German Albums (Offizielle Top 100)	96
Irish Albums (IRMA)	78
Japanese Albums (Oricon)	21
New Zealand Albums (RMNZ)	37
Swiss Albums (Schweizer Hitparade)	59
UK Albums (Official Charts)	101
US Billboard 200	1
US Top Rap Albums (Billboard)	1
US Top R&B/Hip-Hop Albums (Billboard)	1

=== Year-end charts ===
2007 year-end chart performance for T.I. vs. T.I.P.
Chart (2007)	Peak position
US Billboard 200	31
US Top R&B/Hip-Hop Albums (Billboard)	8

2008 year-end chart performance for T.I. vs. T.I.P.
Chart (2008)	Peak position
US Top R&B/Hip-Hop Albums (Billboard)	83

== Certifications ==
Certifications for T.I. vs. T.I.P.
Region	Certification	Certified units/sales
Canada (Music Canada)	Gold	50,000^{^}
United States (RIAA)	Platinum	1,000,000^{^}
^{^} Shipments figures based on certification alone.
