= "Weird Al" Yankovic Live!: The Alpocalypse Tour =

- Poster
- Written by: "Weird Al" Yankovic, Jay Levey
- Directed by: Wayne Isham
- Starring: "Weird Al" Yankovic
- Music by: "Weird Al" Yankovic
- Original language: English

Production
- Producer: Dana Marshall
- Cinematography: Samuel Brownfield
- Editors: George Bellias; Brenda Carlson; Matt Edwards
- Running time: 42 minutes
- Production companies: Ear Booker Productions (credited as Ear Booker Enterprises, Inc.); New Wave Entertainment

Original release
- Release: October 1, 2011

"Weird Al" Yankovic Live! - The Alpocalypse Tour is a live video recording of "Weird Al" Yankovic's concert during the Alpocalypse tour, at Massey Hall, in Toronto, Ontario, Canada, that aired on Comedy Central on October 1, 2011. It was released in an extended edition on Blu-ray and DVD on October 4, 2011. For copyright reasons video clips were edited out.

The televised and extended versions of the concert include live versions of:

1. "Polka Face" (from Alpocalypse album)
2. (drum solo) [DVD]
3. "Frank's 2000" TV" (DVD) (from Alapalooza album)
4. "TMZ" (from Alpocalypse album)
5. (bass solo) [DVD]
6. "You Don't Love Me Anymore" (DVD) (from Off the Deep End album)
7. (drum solo reprise) [DVD]
8. "You Make Me" (DVD) (from Even Worse album)
9. "Smells Like Nirvana" (from Off the Deep End album)
10. "Skipper Dan" (from Alpocalypse album)
11. "Party in the CIA" (from Alpocalypse album)
12. "CNR" (from Alpocalypse album)
13. "Let Me Be Your Hog" (from UHF album)
14. "Canadian Idiot" (from Straight Outta Lynwood album)
15. "Wanna B Ur Lovr" (from Poodle Hat album)
16. Medley
  1. "Money for Nothing/Beverly Hillbillies" (from UHF album)
  2. "Whatever You Like" (from Alpocalypse album)
  3. "Another Tattoo" (from Alpocalypse album)
  4. "EBay" (from Poodle Hat album)
  5. "I Want a New Duck" (from Dare to Be Stupid album)
  6. "Theme from Rocky XIII" (from "Weird Al" Yankovic in 3-D album)
  7. "Spam" (from UHF album)
  8. "My Bologna" (from "Weird Al" Yankovic album)
  9. "Ode to a Superhero" (from Poodle Hat album)
  10. "Lasagna" (from Even Worse album)
  11. "Eat It" (from "Weird Al" Yankovic in 3-D album)
17. "Amish Paradise" (from Bad Hair Day album)
18. "Craigslist" (from Alpocalypse album)
19. "Perform This Way" (from Alpocalypse album)
20. "White & Nerdy" (from Straight Outta Lynwood album)
21. "Fat" (from Even Worse album)
22. "Tocatta and Fugue in D Minor, BWV 565" (Johann Sebastian Bach cover)
23. "The Saga Begins" (from Running with Scissors album)
24. (keyboard solo)
25. "Yoda" (from Dare to Be Stupid album)
