= Whatever You Like (disambiguation) =

"Whatever You Like" is a 2008 song by T.I.

Whatever You Like may also refer to:

- "Whatever You Like" ("Weird Al" Yankovic song), a parody of the T.I. song
- "Whatever U Like", a 2007 song by Nicole Scherzinger featuring T.I.
