= Live Your Life (T.I. song) =

Single by T.I. featuring Rihanna

from the album Paper Trail
- B-side: "Collect Call"
- Released: September 26, 2008
- Recorded: August 2007
- Studio: Echo Studios (Atlanta, GA); Logic Studios (Milan, Italy); Record Plant (Los Angeles, CA); Baseline Recording Studios (New York, NY)
- Genre: Hip-hop; R&B
- Length: 5:37 (main version); 4:02 (radio edit)
- Label: Grand Hustle; Atlantic
- Songwriters: Dan Bălan; Clifford Harris; Makeba Riddick; Justin Smith
- Producers: Just Blaze; Canei Finch

T.I. singles chronology
"Hi Hater (Remix)" (2008)	"Live Your Life" (2008)	"Ready for Whatever" (2008)

Rihanna singles chronology
"Disturbia" (2008)	"Live Your Life" (2008)	"Rehab" (2008)

Music video
- "Live Your Life" on YouTube

"Live Your Life" is a song by the American rapper T.I., featuring the Barbadian singer Rihanna, from T.I.'s sixth album, Paper Trail (2008). It was released as the seventh single from the album on September 26, 2008. The song's lyrics speak of T.I.'s rise to fame and optimism of the future. It also honors the American troops fighting in Iraq. The song both samples and interpolates the 2003 song "Dragostea din tei" by O-Zone.

Despite mixed reviews from music critics, "Live Your Life" was a commercial success worldwide. In the United States, the song topped the Billboard Hot 100, marking T.I.'s third number 1 single, and Rihanna's fifth. The song also attained Top 10 placements in twelve other countries, reaching the top five in Australia, Canada, the Netherlands, New Zealand and the United Kingdom. Furthermore, "Live Your Life" topped the US Mainstream Top 40 and Rap Songs charts and reached number 2 on the Hot R&B/Hip-Hop Songs chart. The song was T.I.'s highest charting and most successful single worldwide until "Blurred Lines" in 2013.

The song's accompanying music video, directed by Anthony Mandler, depicts a story of T.I.'s rise to fame in a narrated form, featuring Rihanna performing in a dressing room and bar. The duo performed "Live Your Life" at the 2008 MTV Video Music Awards.

== Background and release ==
"Live Your Life" includes a sample of the chorus of the O-Zone song "Dragostea din tei" at its beginning and ending, as well as an interpolation of the chorus, with English-language lyrics sung by Rihanna, at the beginning. The song was produced by Just Blaze and Makeba Riddick, and was written by T.I., Just Blaze (credited as Justin Smith) and Riddick. The Moldovan singer-songwriter Dan Bălan, who wrote "Dragostea din tei", is also credited as a writer.

Of Rihanna's involvement, T.I. later stated, "It was a back and forth studio thing with Rihanna. I picked her. I was just able to 'hear' her voice on this record. I could hear her, so I reached out and she said, 'Yes,' thankfully."

An unfinished version of "Live Your Life" leaked onto the Internet on August 26, 2008. The official album version contains Rihanna's verse, and T.I.'s spoken-word introduction, in which he states, "Ay... This a special what's happenin' to all my, all my soldiers over there in Iraq. Errbody right here, what you need to do is be thankful for the life you got you know what I'm sayin'? Stop lookin' at what you ain't got, start and be thankful for what you do got. Let's give it to 'em baby girl". The radio edit lasts for a duration of 4:01, while the album version is 5:39 long, including extended verses from Rihanna. The song was released on September 26 as a digital download via iTunes. It was sent to US rhythmic contemporary radio on October 20, 2008. Official remixes were released with American rappers Pitbull and Rick Ross.

== Critical reception ==
Alex Fletcher of Digital Spy awarded "Live Your Life" two out of five stars saying, "While some will be charmed by T.I's well-meaning lyrics and Rihanna's hypnotic chorus hooks, others will find the mixture of samples and robotic effects grating. Our view? Well, hats off to Rihanna for finally taking time out from mining her Good Girl Gone Bad album, but it's a shame she had to waste her break on a naff novelty release like this."

Weekly newspaper The Village Voice put "Live Your Life" at number 13 on their annual Pazz & Jop critics' poll in 2008; T.I.'s song "Whatever You Like" ended up at number 14 on the same poll.

== Chart performance ==
=== North America ===
In the United States, "Live Your Life" debuted at number 80 on the Billboard Hot 100 for the chart week of October 11, 2008. The song surged to number one the following week, setting a record for the highest jump to number one in history, a feat previously set by T.I. himself six weeks prior with his song "Whatever You Like", which jumped from number 71 to number one on the chart. However, this record was broken again the following week by Britney Spears' "Womanizer" that jumped from number 96 to one. The song marked T.I.'s second Hot 100 number one as a lead artist, and third overall, while it became Rihanna's fifth chart topper. With the latter, Rihanna became the first female artist to have five number ones in the 21st century. In addition, "Live Your Life" replaced "Whatever You Like" at number one on the Hot 100, making T.I. the ninth artist to replace themselves at number one in the history of the chart. "Whatever You Like" simultaneously occupied the number two position on the chart that week, marking the first time an artist has held the top two positions since Akon in 2006. "Live Your Life" had three separate runs at number one on the Hot 100. Prior to this, the only other songs to have three separate turns at the top had been "Le Freak" by Chic in late 1978 and early 1979 plus two other 2008 chart-toppers, Leona Lewis' "Bleeding Love" and T.I's own "Whatever You Like".

For the issue dated December 6, 2008, "Live Your Life" topped the US Pop Songs chart, marking T.I.'s first ever number one single on the chart, and Rihanna's fourth. The single held the top spot for two non-consecutive weeks. The song also topped the Rap Songs chart for ten consecutive weeks. The song entered the US Hot R&B/Hip-Hop Songs chart as the week's "Hot Shot Debut" at number 77. The following week, it rose to number 38. After ten weeks on the chart, the song made a final peak of number two, where it remained for ten consecutive weeks, being barred from the top spot by Beyoncé's hit single "Single Ladies (Put a Ring on It)". The song was certified triple-platinum by the RIAA and it has sold 4.7 million copies in the US. The song also peaked at number four on the Canadian Hot 100.

=== Oceania and Europe ===
In New Zealand, "Live Your Life" debuted at number 23 on October 6, 2008. It entered the top ten in its third week on the chart, steadily rising over the following weeks culminating in its number two peak on December 8, 2008. The song was certified Platinum by the Recording Industry Association of New Zealand for sales of 15,000 copies. On the Australian Singles Chart, the song debuted at number 48 on October 26, 2008. By its fourth week, it had reached the top ten of the chart. The song reached its peak of number three on December 21, where it remained for four consecutive weeks. It received a Platinum certification from the Australian Recording Industry Association for sales of 70,000 copies.

In the United Kingdom, "Live Your Life" entered the UK Singles Chart at number 39 for the week dated November 15, 2008. The following week, it surged to number two, automatically becoming T.I.'s highest-charting single in the country. It also gave Rihanna her sixth top two single on the chart. The song debuted at number three on the Irish Singles Chart, giving T.I. his highest-charting single in the country. It also gave Rihanna her tenth top ten in the region.

== Music video ==
The music video for "Live Your Life" was filmed in October 2008 in Los Angeles and was directed by Anthony Mandler. The video, using the radio edit of the song, features both T.I. and Rihanna. It plays backwards, starting with the end of T.I.'s day. In the opening scene, T.I. is shown walking along the Los Angeles River in a suit with bloody wounds culminating in the song beginning. It then goes into a series of underground shots of him with interspersed scenes of Rihanna in a dressing room. T.I. is then shown being thrown out of a car, in the Los Angeles river. The video then cuts again to the day with T.I. wearing the same suit seen earlier in the video, but undamaged. He then encounters a group of thugs whom he brawls with. The video then begins a different story arc, showing T.I. before he made his fortune, rapping in a recording studio and in front of a house playing dice and dominoes with friends. This portion of the video is interspersed with clips of the other story arc, such as showing T.I. with a briefcase full of money. He is then shown in the bathroom of a bar, before walking out into the bar passing Rihanna who has exited her dressing room. Rihanna performs on stage with a microphone while T.I. talks to a man saying "I want out."; the man replies by explaining that there is no getting out, not for him nor for the character that Rihanna plays. T.I slams the money briefcase down on the table and shows it to the man saying that "I'm done. I got myself here, I'll get myself out". Then he is seen walking into that same bar, in a flashback, with a CD in his hand. The man that T.I. spoke to earlier calls him over. This is a flashback showing T.I. trying to get a record deal. The last shot of the video takes place at around the same time as the first shot of the video. T.I. is walking down the Los Angeles River, raising his hands triumphantly in the air with a bloodied and scarred face. The song's producer, Just Blaze, is briefly seen playing pool in the bar during the second verse and final chorus.

== Live performances ==
T.I. performed the track with Rihanna at the 2008 MTV Video Music Awards on September 7, 2008, following a solo performance of "Whatever You Like" prior. The track was included on the set list of Rihanna's Last Girl on Earth (2010–11) in a medley with Rihanna's own "Wait Your Turn", and the Jay-Z, Rihanna and Kanye West single "Run This Town". It was also performed with "Run This Town" on Rihanna's Loud Tour (2011), promotional tour 777 Tour (2012), Rock in Rio performance (2015) and Anti World Tour (2016).

== Awards ==
Year	Ceremony	Award	Result
2009	ASCAP Pop Music Awards	Most Performed Song	Won
2009	BMI Urban Awards	Award-Winning Songs	Won
2009	Barbados Music Awards	Best Collaboration	Nominated
2009	BET Awards	Best Collaboration	Nominated
2009	BET Awards	Video of the Year	Nominated
2009	BET Awards	Viewer's Choice Award	Won
2009	BET Hip-Hop Awards	Best Hip-Hop Collaboration	Won
2009	BET Hip-Hop Awards	Best Hip-Hop Video	Won
2009	BET Hip-Hop Awards	Track of the Year	Nominated
2009	MTV Australia Awards	Best Collaboration	Won
2009	MTV Video Music Awards Japan	Best Collaboration	Nominated
2009	MTV Video Music Awards Japan	Best Hip-Hop Video	Nominated
2009	MTV Video Music Awards	Best Male Video	Won
2009	MuchMusic Video Awards	Best International Artist Video	Nominated
2009	Teen Choice Awards	Choice Music: Hook Up	Nominated
2010	ASCAP Pop Music Awards	Most Performed Song	Won
2010	ASCAP Rhythm & Soul Music Awards	Most Performed Song	Won
2010	ASCAP Rhythm & Soul Music Awards	Song R&B/Hip-Hop	Won
2010	ASCAP Rhythm & Soul Music Awards	Song Rap	Won
2010	BMI Urban Awards	Award-Winning Songs	Won
2010	BMI Urban Awards	EMI Music Publishing	Won
2010	BMI Pop Awards	Publisher of the Year	Won
2010	BMI Pop Awards	Award-Winning Songs	Won
2010	People's Choice Awards	Favorite Music Collaboration	Nominated

== Track listing ==
Digital download
No.	Title	Version	Length
1.	"Live Your Life (feat. Rihanna)"	Album Version (Explicit)	5:39
Total length:			5:39

CD single
No.	Title	Version	Length
1.	"Live Your Life (feat. Rihanna)"	Album Version (Explicit)	5:41
2.	"Collect Call"	Explicit	4:36
Total length:			10:07

Maxi single
No.	Title	Version	Length
1.	"Live Your Life (feat. Rihanna)"	Album Version (Explicit)	5:41
2.	"Live Your Life (feat. Rihanna)"	Instrumental	5:47
3.	"Collect Call"	Explicit	4:36
4.	"Live Your Life"	Video	5:31
Total length:			20:55

== Charts ==
=== Weekly charts ===
Chart (2008–2009)	Peak position
Australia (ARIA)	3
Austria (Ö3 Austria Top 40)	5
Belgium (Ultratop 50 Flanders)	15
Belgium (Ultratop 50 Wallonia)	19
Canada Hot 100 (Billboard)	4
CIS Airplay (TopHit)	49
Croatia International Airplay (HRT)	10
Czech Republic Airplay (ČNS IFPI)	6
Denmark (Tracklisten)	15
Europe (European Hot 100 Singles)	4
Euro Digital Tracks (Billboard) Explicit version	3
Finland (Suomen virallinen lista)	9
France (SNEP)	17
Germany (GfK)	12
Hungary (Rádiós Top 40)	33
Ireland (IRMA)	3
Latvia (Latvian Airplay Top 50)	8
Netherlands (Dutch Top 40)	5
Netherlands (Single Top 100)	21
New Zealand (Recorded Music NZ)	2
Norway (VG-lista)	6
Russia Airplay (TopHit)	48
Scottish Singles Sales (Official Charts)	9
Slovakia Airplay (ČNS IFPI)	37
Sweden (Sverigetopplistan)	6
Switzerland (Schweizer Hitparade)	8
Ukraine Airplay (TopHit)	144
UK Hip Hop/R&B (Official Charts)	1
UK Singles (Official Charts)	2
US Billboard Hot 100	1
US Hot R&B/Hip-Hop Songs (Billboard)	2
US Hot Rap Songs (Billboard)	1
US Pop Airplay (Billboard)	1
US Rhythmic Airplay (Billboard)	1

=== Monthly charts ===
Monthly chart performance for "Live Your Life"
Chart (2009)	Peak position
CIS Airplay (TopHit)	58
Russia Airplay (TopHit)	56

=== Year-end charts ===
Chart (2008)	Position
Australia (ARIA)	45
Canada (Canadian Hot 100)	98
Sweden (Sverigetopplistan)	99
Switzerland (Schweizer Hitparade)	83
UK Singles (Official Charts Company)	38
US Billboard Hot 100	37
US Hot R&B/Hip-Hop Songs (Billboard)	62

Chart (2009)	Position
Australia (ARIA)	75
Austria (Ö3 Austria Top 40)	71
Brazil (Crowley)	39
Canada (Canadian Hot 100)	24
Croatia International Airplay (HRT)	84
Germany (Official German Charts)	94
Switzerland (Schweizer Hitparade)	70
UK Singles (Official Charts Company)	137
US Billboard Hot 100	18
US Hot R&B/Hip-Hop Songs (Billboard)	17
US Mainstream Top 40 (Billboard)	15
US Rhythmic (Billboard)	10

=== Decade-end charts ===
Chart (2000–2009)	Rank
Australia Singles (ARIA)	81
US Billboard Hot 100	37

== Certifications ==
Region	Certification	Certified units/sales
Australia (ARIA)	Platinum	70,000^{^}
Denmark (IFPI Danmark)	Platinum	90,000^{‡}
Italy (FIMI)	Gold	50,000^{‡}
New Zealand (RMNZ)	4× Platinum	120,000^{‡}
United Kingdom (BPI)	2× Platinum	1,200,000^{‡}
United States (RIAA)	8× Platinum	8,000,000^{‡}
United States (RIAA) Mastertone	Platinum	1,000,000^{^}
^{^} Shipments figures based on certification alone.^{‡} Sales+streaming figures based on certification alone.

== Release history ==
Release dates for "Live Your Life"
Region	Date	Format	Label(s)	Ref.
United States	September 16, 2008	Digital download	Atlantic	
Australia	September 26, 2008	Digital download	Atlantic	
Austria	September 26, 2008	Digital download	Atlantic	
Belgium	September 26, 2008	Digital download	Atlantic	
Canada	September 26, 2008	Digital download	Atlantic	
Denmark	September 26, 2008	Digital download	Atlantic	
Finland	September 26, 2008	Digital download	Atlantic	
France	September 26, 2008	Digital download	Atlantic	
Ireland	September 26, 2008	Digital download	Atlantic	
Italy	September 26, 2008	Digital download	Atlantic	
Mexico	September 26, 2008	Digital download	Atlantic	
Netherlands	September 26, 2008	Digital download	Atlantic	
New Zealand	September 26, 2008	Digital download	Atlantic	
Norway	September 26, 2008	Digital download	Atlantic	
Spain	September 26, 2008	Digital download	Atlantic	
Sweden	September 26, 2008	Digital download	Atlantic	
Switzerland	September 26, 2008	Digital download	Atlantic	
United Kingdom	September 26, 2008	Digital download	Atlantic	
United States	October 20, 2008	Rhythmic contemporary radio	Def Jam; Grand Hustle; Island Def Jam; Atlantic	
United Kingdom	November 24, 2008	CD	Atlantic	

== See also ==
- List of Billboard Hot 100 number ones of 2008
- List of Billboard Mainstream Top 40 number-one songs of 2008
- List of Billboard Mainstream Top 40 number-one songs of 2009
- List of Billboard number-one rap singles of the 2000s
