= Ready for Whatever =

Ready for Whatever may refer to:

- Ready for Whatever (T.I. song)
- Ready for Whatever (Mýa song)
