= Alpocalypse =

Studio album by "Weird Al" Yankovic
- Released: June 21, 2011
- Recorded: September 29, 2008 – April 6, 2011
- Genres: Comedy, parody
- Length: 45:56
- Labels: Volcano; Jive; Way Moby
- Producer: "Weird Al" Yankovic

"Weird Al" Yankovic chronology
The Essential "Weird Al" Yankovic (2009)	Alpocalypse (2011)	Mandatory Fun (2014)

Singles from Alpocalypse
- 1. "Whatever You Like" Released: October 8, 2008; 2. "Craigslist" Released: June 16, 2009; 3. "Skipper Dan" Released: July 14, 2009; 4. "CNR" Released: August 4, 2009; 5. "Ringtone" Released: August 25, 2009; 6. "Perform This Way" Released: April 25, 2011

Alpocalypse is the thirteenth studio album by the American parody musician "Weird Al" Yankovic, released on June 21, 2011. It was the seventh studio album self-produced by Yankovic. The musical styles on the album are built around parodies and pastiches of pop and rock music of the late 2000s and early 2010s. The album's first single, "Whatever You Like", was released almost two and a half years prior to the release of the album, and the single peaked at number 104 on the Billboard Hot 100. The album's final single, "Perform This Way", was released digitally on April 25, 2011, but failed to chart.

Prior to the release of Alpocalypse, Yankovic released the EP Internet Leaks (2009); this was an experiment in using the Internet as a way to release music in an efficient and timely manner. All of the tracks released on Internet Leaks would later be re-released on Alpocalypse. The album was preceded by a minor controversy after Yankovic sought Lady Gaga's permission to record a parody of her song "Born This Way". Yankovic recorded the parody, but due to a communication error was very nearly forced to leave it off the album.

Yankovic produced a music video for every song on the record. Most of these videos were animated, but a live action video for "Perform this Way" was produced. A deluxe edition of the CD was later released that included all of these music videos, sans the ones for "Perform this Way" and "Polka Face". Yankovic later issued Alpocalypse HD, a Blu-ray release which features all 12 music videos from this album, along with three videos from his previous album, Straight Outta Lynwood (2006). Alpocalypse was met with mostly positive reviews, and was nominated for the 2011 Grammy Award for Best Comedy Album. The album peaked at number 9 on the Billboard 200, making it, at the time, Yankovic's highest-charting album.

== Recording and production ==
Alpocalypse followed a five-year gap after the release of Straight Outta Lynwood. Yankovic stated that he had not set any firm date for release of Alpocalypse, and instead wanted to wait for the right time for its release, telling his record label that the album is "going to be out whenever there's a dramatic shift in pop culture – whenever that happens to be". Five of the songs from Alpocalypse were previously recorded by Yankovic and released digitally during 2008 and 2009, "Whatever You Like", "Craigslist", "Skipper Dan", "CNR", and "Ringtone"; the last four were released with their own music videos. These five songs were later packaged as an EP called Internet Leaks (2009), with indications that they would also eventually appear on Yankovic's next published album. Other tracks on the album were recorded in January, May and October 2010. Yankovic waited to release the album until he could cap it off with one final parody of a pop culture song of the moment; the song he chose was Lady Gaga's "Born This Way", which he decided to parody as the album's lead song, "Perform This Way".

=== "Perform This Way" controversy ===
Yankovic sought to gain Lady Gaga's permission for his parody in early 2011, as he has done with all his parody songs in the past. He was told by Gaga's manager that Gaga wanted to read the lyrics before giving approval, then that she wanted to hear a recorded version. After this was done the manager said Gaga denied permission in April 2011, which was a major setback for Yankovic, as he would have to pull the song from the album's release and prepare and record another song in its place, which would delay the album's release further. Yankovic, after spending all this extra effort (he had to work on this while performing an Australian tour, as well as put a family vacation on hold to meet the demands of Gaga's manager) did not want the song to go to waste, and instead posted it to YouTube and other music sites, indicating that he had wished all sales proceeds to go to the Human Rights Campaign charity. Through Twitter and other social websites within the day of posting, Lady Gaga and her staff realized she had never heard the song herself and quickly gave permission for Yankovic to use the song, saying Gaga was "a huge 'Weird Al' fan". Yankovic was able to set the date of Alpocalypse's release by the end of that day, and claimed that "Twitter saved my album" based on the rapid turnaround by his fans and Lady Gaga.

== Composition ==
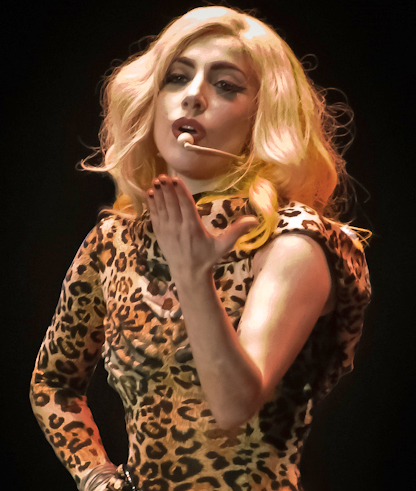
The album's opening track, "Perform This Way", is a parody of "Born This Way" by Lady Gaga (pictured).

The album's opening track, "Perform This Way", is a parody of "Born This Way" by Lady Gaga. The lyrics are told from the point of view of Gaga, and describe her performance style and fashion sense. The song's associated music video shows Yankovic's face superimposed on a female dancer, dancing and performing in many outfits that parody those worn by Gaga or original creations inspired by the artist.

"CNR" is a style parody of the White Stripes, in particular borrowing heavily from "Dead Leaves and the Dirty Ground". The song's lyrics are about superhuman feats that Charles Nelson Reilly could accomplish, similar to Chuck Norris facts. When Yankovic came up with the idea of a song about Reilly, he contacted Reilly's widower Patrick Hughes for permission. Hughes' only request was that Yankovic "not make [Reilly] out to be too much of a sissy;" in response, Yankovic thought it would be funny to go as far in the opposite direction as possible. The song's end is also very similar to the chorus of the song "You Don't Mess Around with Jim". The video, created by JibJab, animates the song's lyrics using JibJab employees as actors against a green screen, interspersed with shots of Yankovic and Jon "Bermuda" Schwartz performing on a White Stripes-inspired red-and-white set, dressed as Jack White and Meg White, respectively. In a first for any major recording artist, users of JibJab's web site had the option of including themselves in the music video.

The third track on the album, "TMZ", which is a parody of "You Belong with Me" by Taylor Swift, is about celebrities whose failings, no matter how minor, appear on the celebrity gossip site TMZ.com. The music video, by Bill Plympton, is about a female celebrity whose bare buttocks are photographed by a TMZ paparazzo and then appear everywhere she goes. Voice actor and comedian Tom Kenny is featured as a voice shouting out various tabloid headlines during an instrumental solo. Yankovic performed the song on The Late Late Show with Craig Ferguson on February 9, 2012.

"Skipper Dan" is a style parody of Weezer. The lyrics describe a man who, despite having a fine arts degree, is forced to have a mundane job as a tour guide on the Jungle Cruise ride at Disneyland. Yankovic was inspired to write the song after going on the ride with his family, during which the guide "offhandedly referred to his failed acting career". Yankovic hit upon this idea and developed the character of the narrator to write the song along. Though still a comedy song, it has a far more serious and somber tone than most of Yankovic's work. Yankovic has stated that actual skippers on the Jungle Cruise ride have responded positively to this song. The music video was created by Divya Srinivasan. In live performance, Yankovic wears an authentic Jungle Cruise uniform.

The fifth track on the album, "Polka Face", is a polka medley that includes the following songs: "Liechtensteiner Polka", "Poker Face" by Lady Gaga, "Womanizer" by Britney Spears, "Right Round" by Flo Rida featuring Kesha, "Day 'n' Nite" by Kid Cudi, "Need You Now" by Lady Antebellum, "Baby" by Justin Bieber featuring Ludacris, "So What" by Pink, "I Kissed a Girl" by Katy Perry, "Fireflies" by Owl City, "Blame It" by Jamie Foxx featuring T-Pain, "Replay" by Iyaz, "Down" by Jay Sean featuring Lil Wayne, "Break Your Heart" by Taio Cruz featuring Ludacris, "The Tick Tock Polka" by Frankie Yankovic, "Tik Tok" by Kesha, and "Whatever's Left Over Polka" by "Weird Al" Yankovic.

"Craigslist" is a style parody of the Doors. The lyrics mimic listings on Craigslist. Keyboard work was performed by former Doors member Ray Manzarek. A low-budget video of Yankovic dressed as Jim Morrison with art-house and stock footage effects was produced by Liam Lynch.

The seventh track on the album, "Party in the CIA" is a parody of "Party in the U.S.A." by Miley Cyrus The song is about a CIA operative and all the missions he goes on, including covert assassination attempts and torturing "the folks [The CIA] don't like." Yankovic recognized that the original "Party in the U.S.A." was a sensational hit, and sought to find a topic to contrast the "pop, bubblegum-y fluff" of the original song. It has a music video animated by a team led by Roque Ballesteros, the group responsible for Happy Tree Friends. Yankovic sought this team, believing their dark comedic work on "Happy Tree Friends" matched well with his lyrics for "Party in the CIA".

The eighth track on the album, "Ringtone" is a style parody of Queen. The lyrics are about the downsides of having an annoying cell phone ringtone. The song has an associated music video created by SuperNews!, which premiered August 21, 2009.

The ninth track on the album, "Another Tattoo", is a parody of "Nothin' on You" by B.o.B featuring Bruno Mars. The song is about a person who keeps getting more and more bizarre tattoos. The video was made by Augenblick Studios and consists of showing a man's tattoos.

The tenth track on the album, "If That Isn't Love", is a style parody of Hanson, with Taylor Hanson on piano. The song is about all of the extremely unromantic and sometimes misguided things that the singer does to show his love for his significant other, such as "let you warm your freezing hands inside my buttcrack." The music video was animated and directed by Brian Frisk.

The eleventh track on the album, "Whatever You Like", is a parody of T.I.'s "Whatever You Like". The song is about a man who woos his girlfriend amid financial hardships. A video was made in 2010 by Cris Shapan.

The final track on the album, "Stop Forwarding That Crap to Me", is a style parody of the work of Jim Steinman. The song is a diatribe against someone sending the narrator useless junk emails. The music video is a kinetic typography representation of the lyrics made by Koos Dekker.

== Title and artwork ==
The name Alpocalypse is a play on words that Yankovic had listed in a notebook with other potential album titles. It was chosen to parody recent public fears of an apocalypse, such as the May 2011 end times predictions and the 2012 doomsday predictions: "I figured that I might as well do my apocalypse-themed album before the actual apocalypse because I really don't think people are gonna be buying CDs at the end of the world," Yankovic stated. The title is tied to the album's cover art, a parody image depicting a happily waving Yankovic as one of the Four Horsemen of the Apocalypse. He rides the Black Horse, generally understood as Famine, which Yankovic attributed to "all the songs I had written about food in the '80s".

== Visuals ==
Yankovic created music videos for every song on the album. At the time of the album's release, videos for all but two of the songs were included with the physical DVD and deluxe downloadable version of the album. A live-action video for "Perform This Way" was released a day prior to the release of the album, while a video for the polka medley, "Polka Face", was slated to be released in late July. It was finally released in late September 2011 on Comedy Central's Jokes.com. The polka medley video, primarily animated but featuring some live-action takes, is the first time that Yankovic has created a video for his traditional polka medleys. Yankovic later released Alpocalypse HD, which features all 12 music videos on Blu-ray, along with three from his previous album Straight Outta Lynwood.

== Critical reception ==
Professional ratings
Aggregate scores
Source	Rating
Metacritic	70/100
Review scores
Source	Rating
AllMusic	3.5/5 stars
The A.V. Club	B+
Pitchfork	7.4/10
No Ripcord	8/10
IGN	8.5/10
Billboard	positive
PopCrush	4/5 stars
Rolling Stone	2.5/5 stars
Consequence of Sound	3.5/5 stars

Alpocalypse has received moderately favorable reviews from critics. Allmusic's David Jeffries rated the album three-and-a-half out of five stars, declaring that the album "fits the Yankovic album template splendidly, offering a great gut busters-to-groaners ratio". Although he pointed out that "five of these tracks are repeated from the Internet Leaks EP", he concluded by stating that "Al remains the undisputed king of the parody song." Matt Wild, writing for the entertainment newspaper The A.V. Club, rated it a B+, explaining that "Yankovic once again goofs on an increasingly throwaway pop landscape, and barely manages to keep up." However, he stated that it "is the most enjoyable collection of Yankovic tunes since 1996's Bad Hair Day." Jason Lipshutz of Billboard gave it a positive review. He declared that its songs "will still be examples of highly intelligent musical comedy" over time, and that the album "is essentially the same kind of album Yankovic has been making for 20 years". Although he stated that "the parodies of specific songs are a bit stronger than the originals this time out", he also said that "the laughs remain just as consistent as they've always been."

Scott Shetler, of music news website PopCrush, rated it four out of five stars. He reviewed the album's songs individually. He called "Perform This Way" "[an] impressive way to kick off the album." Although he stated that "Skipper Dan" was "a strikeout" and that "the story is actually kind of a bummer", and that "Party in the CIA" "doesn't have the same irresistible vibe of Miley [Cyrus]'s original", he concluded by declaring that the album as a whole "is one of the better records Weird Al has made in recent years." Will Hermes of Rolling Stone, however, gave it a negative review, calling it a "batch of fish in a barrel" and stating that "the jokes don't always relieve the earworm annoyingness of the Xeroxed tunes."

=== Accolades ===
The album was nominated for the 2011 Grammy Award for Best Comedy Album.

== Commercial performance ==
Alpocalypse debuted on the Billboard 200 at number 9, Yankovic's highest chart position at the time, and managed to sell 44,000 copies in its first week. During its second week, the album dropped to number 44, selling 10,353 copies. As of August 2014, the album has sold 139,000 copies.

== Track listing ==
No.	Title	Writer(s)	Parody of	Length
1.	"Perform This Way"	Stefani Germanotta, Jeppe Laursen, Paul Blair, Fernando Garibay, Alfred Yankovic	"Born This Way" by Lady Gaga	2:54
2.	"CNR"	Yankovic	Style parody of The White Stripes	3:21
3.	"TMZ"	Taylor Swift, Liz Rose, Yankovic	"You Belong with Me" by Taylor Swift	3:40
4.	"Skipper Dan"	Yankovic	Style parody of Weezer	4:01
5.	"Polka Face"	Various	A polka medley including: "Liechtensteiner Polka" (0:18); "Poker Face" by Lady Gaga (0:24); "Womanizer" by Britney Spears (0:23); "Right Round" by Flo Rida featuring Kesha (0:12); "Day 'n' Nite" by Kid Cudi (0:12); "Need You Now" by Lady Antebellum (0:18); "Baby" by Justin Bieber featuring Ludacris (0:10); "So What" by Pink (0:28); "I Kissed a Girl" by Katy Perry (0:21); "Fireflies" by Owl City (0:16); "Blame It" by Jamie Foxx featuring T-Pain (0:16); "Replay" by Iyaz (0:12); "Down" by Jay Sean featuring Lil Wayne (0:11); "Break Your Heart" by Taio Cruz featuring Ludacris (0:12); "The Tick Tock Polka" by Frankie Yankovic (0:11); "Tik Tok" by Kesha (0:13); "Whatever's Left Over Polka" (0:30)	4:47
6.	"Craigslist"	Yankovic	Style parody of The Doors	4:53
7.	"Party in the CIA"	Lukasz Gottwald, Claude Kelly, Jessica Cornish, Yankovic	"Party in the U.S.A." by Miley Cyrus	2:56
8.	"Ringtone"	Yankovic	Style parody of Queen	3:24
9.	"Another Tattoo"	Bobby Simmons Jr., Peter Hernandez, Philip Lawrence, Ari Levine, Yankovic	"Nothin' on You" by B.o.B featuring Bruno Mars	2:49
10.	"If That Isn't Love"	Yankovic	Style parody of Hanson	3:48
11.	"Whatever You Like"	Clifford Harris Jr., James Scheffer, David Siegel, Yankovic	"Whatever You Like" by T.I.	3:41
12.	"Stop Forwarding That Crap to Me"	Yankovic	Style parody of Jim Steinman	5:42
Total length:				45:56

== DVD ==
The deluxe edition of Alpocalypse included a DVD with the following music videos:

1. "CNR": animated and directed by JibJab.com
2. "TMZ": animated and directed by Bill Plympton. Production Supervisor: Desiree Stavracos/Colorist: Lindsay Woods. Executive Producer: Ron Diamond, Acme Filmworks
3. "Skipper Dan": animated and directed by Divya Srinivasan
4. "Craigslist": directed by Liam Lynch
5. "Party in the CIA": directed by Roque Ballesteros. Produced by Julie Moskowits & Corrine Wong for Ghostbot, Inc. Art Director: Roman Laney/Animators: Sam Chi, Tony Cliff, Alan Lau, Kevin Navarro & Brad Rau/Assistant Animators: Jamaica Dyer & Kris Toscanini
6. "Ringtone": directed by Josh Faure-Brac for Current TV's SuperNews!/Lead Animator: Steven K.L. Olson
7. "Another Tattoo": animated and directed by Augenblick Studios
8. "If That Isn't Love": animated and directed by Brian Frisk
9. "Whatever You Like": animated and directed Cris Shapan
10. "Stop Forwarding That Crap to Me": animated and directed by Koos Dekker

== Personnel ==
Adapted from the Alpocalypse liner notes and the official "Weird Al" Yankovic website.

Band members and production

- "Weird Al" Yankovic – vocals, accordion, keyboards, backing vocals, hand claps
- Jim "Kimo" West – guitar, mandolin, banjo, keyboards, vocals, hand claps
- Steve Jay – bass guitar, banjo, vocals, hand claps, orchestration on "Stop Forwarding That Crap To Me"
- Jon "Bermuda" Schwartz – drums, percussion, hand claps, drum programming, vocals
- Rubén Valtierra – keyboards on "Ringtone"
- Brian Warwick – engineer
- Tony Papa – engineer
- Rafael Serrano – engineer

Additional performers

- Kim Bullard – keyboards on "Stop Forwarding That Crap To Me"
- Lisa Popeil – choir vocals on "Stop Forwarding That Crap To Me"
- Monique Donnelly – backing vocals on "Perform This Way" and choir vocals on "Stop Forwarding That Crap To Me"
- Angie Jaree – choir vocals on "Stop Forwarding That Crap To Me"
- Scottie Haskell – choir vocals on "Stop Forwarding That Crap To Me"
- David Joyce – choir vocals on "Stop Forwarding That Crap To Me"
- Randy Crenshaw – choir vocals on "Stop Forwarding That Crap To Me"
- Marty Rifkin – pedal steel guitar on "TMZ"
- Warren Luening – trumpet on "Polka Face"
- Joel Peskin – clarinet on "Polka Face"
- Jim Self – tuba on "Polka Face"
- John Dickson – French horn on "Stop Forwarding That Crap To Me"
- Tom Kenny – voiceover on "TMZ"
- Ray Manzarek – keyboards on "Craigslist"
- Taylor Hanson – piano on "If That Isn't Love"

== Charts ==
=== Weekly ===
Chart (2011)	Peak position
Australian Albums Charts	28
Canadian Albums Chart	13
US Billboard 200	9
US Billboard Top Comedy Albums	1

=== Year end ===
Chart (2011)	Position
US Top Comedy Albums (Billboard)	2

Chart (2012)	Position
US Top Comedy Albums (Billboard)	7
