= Literal music video =

Satirical remix of an official music video clip

A literal music video, also called a literal video version, is a satirical remix of an official music video clip in which the lyrics have been replaced with lyrics that describe the visuals in the video.

Literal video versions are usually based on music videos in which the imagery appears illogical, disconnected with the lyrics, and more concerned with impressive visuals than actual meaning. Most of the literal videos have been based on music videos from the 1980s and 1990s. Literal videos generally have new lyrics dubbed over those of the original video, and often include subtitles for better clarity. Lyrics range from references to the video editing (such as Anthony Kiedis being dubbed as saying "Now superimpose on me/someone's ugly house" in the Red Hot Chili Peppers' video for "Under the Bridge"), to questioning the unusual things depicted in the video which are usually, by convention, ignored by the participants (for example the lyrics "What's happening with that monkey?/What is with this gas mask?/This is a strange library." from the literal version of Tears for Fears' "Head Over Heels").

The versions of "Take On Me" and "Total Eclipse of the Heart" have seen millions of views on YouTube and have created a brief resurgence of the original song in the popular culture. In the concept's first year, YouTube has hosted 100 different "literal version" videos, from users all over the world, including foreign language entries.

== Conception ==
The first known example of this meme, a redub of A-ha's "Take on Me", was posted on YouTube by Dustin McLean in his now-defunct channel Dusto McNeato, in October 2008. McLean, who worked on the animated SuperNews! show on Current TV, stated that the idea for literal videos came about from an inside joke with his fellow workers, and that two of his coworkers along with his wife helped to provide the new vocal lyrics.

In the two months after "Take On Me" was posted, ten other YouTube users began making literal versions of their own. The most popular of these initial non-McLean videos was a redub of Rick Astley's "Never Gonna Give You Up", by copyrighthater, which went on to receive over two million views in its first year online. The new lyrics give a nod to "Rickrolling", a previous internet meme that involved tricking people into watching the original video of the same song.

== Total Eclipse of the Heart ==
In the first third of 2009, McLean and seven other people made new literal videos. Five of these were by David A. Scott (dascottjr), a commercial producer in upstate New York. His sixth video, a redub of Bonnie Tyler's "Total Eclipse of the Heart" was posted on May 25, 2009 with the singing done by Scott's friend Felisha Noble. Shortly after, links to it appeared on websites for Entertainment Weekly, the Twitter page of Ashton Kutcher, and Perez Hilton's Twitter page too. From there, the video received 1,009,331 views in its first ten days, surpassing two million views in three weeks. After nearly eleven million views, Sony had YouTube block the video worldwide in 2011. (Shortly before his account was terminated in February 2014, the video was unblocked, and surpassed eleven million.) It is still viewable on Funny Or Die's website, where it has received over 100,000 views, qualifying it for "Immortal" status since April 2012.

== Copyright issues ==
In December 2008, literal versions of "Take On Me" and "Under the Bridge" were removed from Dustin McLean's YouTube account, due to copyright claims by Warner Music Group. By that time, "Take On Me" had 2,321,793 views, while "Under the Bridge" had 340,927. Both videos continued to be available on McLean's "Funny or Die" page, while copied versions were posted by other users on YouTube.

Two of Scott's literal videos, Crowded House's "World Where You Live" and The Killers' "Read My Mind" were banned in several non-U.S. countries immediately upon upload, due to copyright restrictions by EMI and Universal Music Group, respectively. In December 2009, the Killers video was blocked worldwide.

In August 2009, YouTube user Torrey Meeks, a.k.a. levmyshkin (whose May 2008 "Bill O'Reilly Flips Out - DANCE REMIX" got 2.9 million views in its first year) saw his literal version of Michael Jackson's "Smooth Criminal" taken down, after a copyright claim by Sony Music, one month after he had posted it. Meeks contested the claim soon after.

Later that month (less than a week after excerpts were shown on ABC's "Nightline"), the literal videos for "Total Eclipse of the Heart" and James Blunt's "You're Beautiful" (the latter posted by deshem in December 2008) were both removed from YouTube, after a copyright claim by EMI Music. Via YouTube and Facebook, David A. Scott encouraged friends and fans of the videos to complain about the ban to YouTube and EMI.

Before Scott could contact YouTube or EMI himself, both videos were restored to their original accounts on August 26, only two days after they were banned. YouTube and EMI gave no reason for the reversal. That same day, YouTube also unbanned McLean's videos of "Take On Me" and "Under the Bridge", without saying why. Also that day, YouTube accepted Meeks' counter-notification, restoring his video of "Smooth Criminal". However, Sony had Meeks' video removed again by September 1. By the end of December, all but one of Meeks' six literal videos were removed, due to copyright claims by UMG. McLean's "Under the Bridge" was blocked again in 2010.

In November 2009, CeilingofStars posted a literal version of Lady Gaga's "Bad Romance". The video was automatically blocked by YouTube for containing material owned by UMG. The copyright claim was contested, and the video reappeared online, shortly before being removed by Universal. Around the same time, Warner Music Group had cushlinkes' literal version of "Whip It" removed as well. By the end of December 2009, over twenty of the 100 English language literal videos had been removed from YouTube, mostly due to copyright claims from Universal Music Group and Sony Music. Artists parodied by the removed videos included Billy Joel, Boyz II Men, REM, Lady Gaga, Britney Spears, Hanson, Cyndi Lauper, and Rick Astley. Some of the removed videos have been re-uploaded on other video websites. Record companies, claiming copyright infringement, would continue to block and remove literal videos from YouTube.

According to McLean, various networks (MTV, VH1, and CMT) have contacted him about turning the concept into a TV program. However, the difficulty in getting the rights to original music videos has scared off most developers.

In February 2014, YouTube terminated David A. Scott's entire YouTube account, citing "multiple third-party notifications of copyright infringement". He had received two previous, expired copyright strikes in April 2012, for his Killers and Mika videos (both by UMG). The three strikes he received in 2014 were for videos by The Beatles (Apple Corps), Crowded House (UMG), and Nirvana (UMG).

In 2014, Scott uploaded all of his literal videos to his Funny or Die channel. In 2018, Funny or Die moved all of its site's uploaded videos onto a YouTube server, causing four of Scott's videos to be removed (and redirected to different videos) by YouTube's copyright detection. At the same time, Funny or Die announced they would "no longer support open user-generated content", meaning that Scott would no longer be able to edit his Funny or Die page or upload new material.

== Mainstream mentions ==
- In the meme's first year, McLean's web, TV, and radio interviews included MSNBC, Rolling Stone, The Boston Globe, The Wall Street Journal, WTOP Talk Radio, and ABC's Nightline. That same year, Scott's "Total Eclipse" video was featured on XM Radio's Opie and Anthony, CNN's Anderson Cooper 360°, E!'s The Daily 10, Fox's Good Day L.A., ABC's Nightline, CNN's iReport, and in WIRED magazine.
- Literal video versions shown or referred to during TV reports (U.S. and abroad): "Take On Me", "Head Over Heels", "Under the Bridge", "White Wedding", "Loser", "Total Eclipse of the Heart", "Daydream Believer", "You're Beautiful", "Never Gonna Give You Up", "Losing My Religion", "Birdhouse in Your Soul", "I'd Do Anything for Love (But I Won't Do That)", and "We Built This City".
- TIME magazine's website listed "Total Eclipse of the Heart: Literal Video Version" as the No. 6 Top Viral Video of 2009. The site's blurb about the video included interview bytes from McLean, but no mention of Scott. In the article's first week online, the video was listed as No. 2 instead of No. 6. No reason was given for the change.
- In December 2009, Current TV featured "Literal Video Versions" as No. 20 on their "50 Greatest Viral Videos" TV special.
- In March 2010, TIME magazine's website named "Literal Music Videos" (using "Total Eclipse of the Heart" for an example) as No. 18 on their list of "YouTube's 50 Best Videos".
- In April 2010, "Total Eclipse of the Heart: Literal Video Version" was named an "Official Honoree" in the "Online Film & Video"/"Viral" category of the 2010 Webby Awards.
- In July 2010, TIME magazine's website mentioned "Literal Music Videos" (naming "Total Eclipse of the Heart") as one of five "Great Moments in Web Comedy". The mention (with an image of Bonnie Tyler) later appeared in an August print issue.

== Artist reactions ==
- According to a forwarded email originating from their press manager Peter Green, Crowded House have seen David A. Scott's March 2009 literal video of them, and that bassist Nick Seymour "liked especially".
- Less than two weeks after Dustin McLean's literal version of Beck's "Loser" video was posted on Funny or Die (and later on YouTube), Beck himself featured it on his official website. This did not keep his record company (UMG) from blocking the video on YouTube the following year.
- In a March 2010 interview with Rolling Stone, keyboardist Magne Furuholmen of A-ha admitted to having seen Dustin McLean's literal parody of their "Take On Me" video. "I thought it was fucking fantastic. It was amazing. I wish we'd have that video back when we made it. The lyrics make so much more sense than the one we have."
- In May 2010, Swedish pop group Le Kid uploaded a literal version of their own recent video (and song), "Mercy Mercy", to their official YouTube channel.
- On July 29, 2010, David Hasselhoff featured David A. Scott's literal parody of "Hooked on a Feeling" on his official website, calling it "well done", and stating, "I have to admit that this re-edit did make me laugh."
- In Summer 2010, the live online series "ACME Saturday Night" premiered a literal version of Jeremy Jordan's 1992 video for "The Right Kind of Love", which featured vocals by Jordan himself, who also appeared in a newly shot segment for the last verse. (The video was later uploaded to YouTube in August.)
- In October 2010, Mr. Mister (while plugging the official release of their album "Pull") left HomestarRunnerTron a YouTube comment on his literal version of "Kyrie", calling his parody of them, "Hilarious! Thanks for the laughs."
- In August 2014, Bonnie Tyler admitted to the Irish Times that she had seen David A. Scott's "Total Eclipse of the Heart" literal video parody, saying that she cracks up at the line, "Spin around, ninjas".

== See also ==
- List of Internet phenomena
- Audio description
