= Mitchelle'l =

American singer-songwriter

- Born: Mitchelle'l Sium; Houston, Texas, United States
- Genres: R&B; soul; Southern soul
- Occupation: Singer-songwriter
- Instrument: Vocals
- Years active: 2004–present
- Label: Grand Hustle

Mitchelle'l Sium is an American singer and songwriter from Houston, Texas. He was discovered on Myspace.com and brought to American rapper T.I.'s Atlanta-based record label Grand Hustle Records by general manager Hannah Kang. In 2008, Sium signed a record deal with Grand Hustle Records. Sium has collaborated with rappers such as T.I., Jeezy, Ty Dolla $ign, BJ The Chicago Kid, Charlie Wilson, Lil Duval, B.o.B, Yo Gotti, 8Ball & MJG and Nelly.

== Early life ==
Mitchelle'l Sium was born in Houston, Texas, to a father from Eritrea and a mother of Creole descent.

== Musical career ==
=== Career beginnings ===
In late 2007, Hannah Kang, general manager for Atlanta-based record label Grand Hustle Records, noticed Sium on Myspace, and introduced him to Grand Hustle head T.I. In 2008, Sium had signed a recording contract with Grand Hustle Records. In 2008, Sium was featured on a song titled “Collect Call”, which was included as a bonus track on T.I.’s highly acclaimed sixth album, Paper Trail. He appeared on the song "How Life Changed", from T.I.'s 2010 album, No Mercy. On September 23, 2011, he released a song titled "Only a Few". In 2011, he appeared on Jeezy’s long-awaited Thug Motivation 103: Hustlerz Ambition album, on a song called "Higher Learning." His debut single "Irene" features Maybach Music's Wale, production by Grand Hustle record producer C-Gutta and co-written by actor Omar Epps.

== Artistry ==
=== Voice and songwriting ===
The in-house disc jockey of Grand Hustle, DJ MLK, has described Sium as "sound[ing] like a young Maxwell." In 2012, American radio show host and internet celebrity B. Scott, wrote in a review that he "sounds a bit like Maxwell meets Van Hunt". Also in 2012, after the release of a song titled "Irene", from Sium's mixtape of the same name, grownfolksmusic.com wrote "Mitchelle’l already has a smooth, soulful vibe going that is reminiscent of artists like Maxwell and Robin Thicke and works just fine without a guest rapper. Hopefully there are more sensual, smoothed-out tracks like this one coming down the line from Mitchelle’l."

== Discography ==
=== Mixtapes ===
List of mixtapes, with selected details and year released
Title	Album details
IRENE (with DJ Green Lantern)	Released: July 18, 2012; Label: Self-released; Format: Digital download

=== Singles as featured artist ===
List of singles, with selected chart positions, showing year released and album name
Title	Year	Peak chart positions		Album
Title	Year	US	US R&B	Album
"Picture Me Swangin" (De'Lorean featuring Mitchelle'l)	2014	—	—	Look Alive

=== Guest appearances ===
List of non-single guest appearances, with other performing artists, showing year released and album name
Title	Year	Other artist(s)	Album
"Collect Calls"	2008	T.I.	Paper Trail
"Da A"	2010	Big Kuntry King	Cocaine 2
"Dats My Dawg"	2010	Big Kuntry King	Cocaine 2
"Right Now"	2010	8Ball & MJG	Ten Toes Down
"Billy (Truth Be Told)"	2010	8Ball & MJG	Ten Toes Down
"So Much Money (Remix)"	2010	8Ball & MJG, Yo Gotti	—N/a
"How Life Changed"	2010	T.I., Scarface	No Mercy
"Feet Don't Fail Me Now"	2011	Spodee, B.o.B, T.I.	No Pressure
"Sunlight"	2011	Spodee, B.o.B	No Pressure
"Hello"	2011	Young Dro	Drocabulary
"Wanna Blow"	2011	Big Kuntry King	Everything Big
"Follow Me Home"	2011	Big Kuntry King, C-Gutta	Everything Big
"Higher Learning"	2011	Young Jeezy, Devin the Dude, Snoop Dogg	TM 103: Hustlerz Ambition
"La Folie Des Grandeurs"	2012	Gizo Evoracci	Overdose
"Intro"	2013	T.I.	G.D.O.D. (Get Dough or Die)
"Love to Hate Me"	2014	Doe B, Big Kuntry King, T.I.	DOAT 3 (Definition of a Trapper)
"Puttin in Work"	2014	Doe B, Trae tha Truth, Young Dro, 5Mics, Yung Booke	G.D.O.D. II
"Picture Me Swangin (Remix)"	2015	De'Lorean, Slim Thug, Lil Keke, Paul Wall	Look Alive
