= Swing Ya Rag =

2008 single by T.I. featuring Swizz Beatz

Single by T.I. featuring Swizz Beatz

from the album Paper Trail
- Released: August 26, 2008 (digital download)
- Recorded: 2008
- Genre: Hip-hop
- Label: Atlantic; Grand Hustle
- Songwriters: Clifford Harris; Kasseem Dean; Avery Chambliss; Joseph Alexander
- Producers: Swizz Beatz; The Individualz

T.I. singles chronology
"Whatever You Like" (2008)	"Swing Ya Rag" (2008)	"What Up, What's Haapnin'" (2008)

Swizz Beatz singles chronology
"Blow Ya Mind" (2007)	"Swing Ya Rag" (2008)	"Who's Real" (2009)

"Swing Ya Rag" is a song by American rapper T.I., released August 26, 2008 as the third single from his sixth studio album Paper Trail (2008). The song features vocals and instrumental production from Swizz Beatz, who raps the chorus. T.I. performed the song at the 2008 BET Hip Hop Awards and at the 2009 New Year's Eve Special on NBC. The song is also featured in the 2009 video game expansion pack, Grand Theft Auto IV: The Lost and Damned.

== Music video ==
On August 5, 2008, a behind-the-scenes video of the music video was released online. In the footage, T.I. is wearing black leather jacket and swinging a red rag in the air, while he wears a black rag around his face. The music video for the song was shot the day after T.I. shot the music video for "What Up, What's Haapnin'".

According to T.I. and MTV, the music video will never be released.

We did it, and it came out hot, Louis [Vuitton] and Gucci started trippin' about it. They were saying we were infringing, in one way or another. They weren't happy about it. They didn't want it to come out. But it's hot, though.

On December 15, MTV did another interview asking T.I. if he'll shoot a different video for the song, he responded saying:

We spoke to them, the video, it's done. But I guess it's one of those corporate things where they don't wanna be associated or affiliated with a certain type of brand. A T.I. video ain't the best look in their eyes right now. No harsh feelings. At the end of the day, it's gonna be a time when somebody is gonna have to sit at my table, and we gonna have the same type of conversations. It might be something as simple as just a party or endorsement. One thing is, the world goes around and comes back. I can take it when it's my turn.

== Track listing ==
Digital single

No.	Title	Writer(s)	Producer(s)	Length
1.	"Swing Ya Rag" (feat. Swizz Beatz)	C. Harris, K. Dean, A. Chambliss, J. Alexander	Swizz Beatz	3:20

== Remixes ==
- Swing Ya Rag - Clipse Feat. Swizz Beatz
- It's The New - Royce Da 5'9"

== Charts ==
Chart (2008)	Peak position
US Billboard Hot 100	62
US Hot R&B/Hip-Hop Songs (Billboard)	53
