= What Up, What's Haapnin' =

Single by T.I.

from the album Paper Trail
- Released: September 2, 2008
- Genre: Southern hip hop
- Length: 5:21 (explicit version); 5:05 (clean version)
- Label: Atlantic; Grand Hustle
- Songwriters: Harris, Jr.; Gholson; Harvey Mason, Jr.
- Producer: Drumma Boy

T.I. singles chronology
"Swing Ya Rag" (2008)	"What Up, What's Haapnin'" (2008)	"Wish You Would" (2008)

"What Up, What's Haapnin'" is a song by American rapper T.I., released on September 2, 2008, as the fifth single from his sixth studio album Paper Trail (2008). The song, which was produced by high-profile American record producer Drumma Boy, is a diss track directed towards fellow Atlanta-based rapper Shawty Lo, in response to his multiple accusations that T.I. is not from his hometown of Bankhead. The song peaked at 84 on the Billboard Hot 100 and at number 97 on the Hot R&B/Hip-Hop Songs chart, when it first leaked online. The video had made its way to iTunes, BET's 106 & Park, and MTV.

== Music video ==
The music video for this track premiered on Streetcred.com on September 12, 2008. It was officially released for download on iTunes on September 16, 2008.

The video, directed by Kai Crawford, was filmed in Shawty Lo’s neighborhood. Towards the end of the video T.I. and others can be seen mocking Lo by doing the dance that accompanied his single "Dey Know".

The video includes cameo appearances from Lil Duval, Lil 3rd, Alfamega, Big Kuntry King, Rocko and Future, as well as a relatively unknown Meek Mill, who at the time had just signed to T.I.‘s Grand Hustle label.

== Track listing ==
Digital single

No.	Title	Writer(s)	Sample(s)	Length
1.	"What Up, What's Haapnin'"	^{Clifford Harris, Christopher Gholson, Harvey Mason}	* Contains samples of "Never Give You Up" performed by Harvey Mason	5:21

== Other versions ==
- T.I. feat. Playaz Circle - "What Up"
- T.I. feat. Young Jeezy - "That Ain't It (Uhh Uhh)"

== Chart positions ==
Chart (2008)	Peak position
US Billboard Hot 100	84
US Hot R&B/Hip-Hop Songs (Billboard)	97
US Hot Rap Songs (Billboard)	34
