= Perform This Way =

Song by 'Weird Al' Yankovic from Alpocalypse

Single by "Weird Al" Yankovic

from the album Alpocalypse
- Released: April 25, 2011
- Recorded: April 6, 2011
- Genre: Comedy; parody; electropop; dance-pop
- Length: 2:53
- Label: Volcano
- Songwriters: Stefani Germanotta; Jeppe Laursen; Paul Blair; Fernando Garibay; "Weird Al" Yankovic
- Producer: "Weird Al" Yankovic

"Weird Al" Yankovic singles chronology
"Ringtone" (2010)	"Perform This Way" (2011)	"Captain Underpants Theme Song" (2017)

Music video
- ”Perform This Way“ on YouTube

"Perform This Way" is a song parody by American musician "Weird Al" Yankovic of "Born This Way" by Lady Gaga. The lyrics are told from the point of view of Gaga and describe her performance style and fashion sense. The song is the sixth single from Yankovic's 2011 album Alpocalypse, and all the proceeds were donated to the Human Rights Campaign charity. Gaga herself has praised the work and has additionally described herself as a "Weird Al" fan. The song entered and peaked at number six on the Comedy Digital Tracks chart of Billboard, remaining for a total of eight weeks.

== Development ==
Yankovic had already completed 11 songs for Alpocalypse, but still felt the need for another song to be the lead single. As "Born This Way" was becoming more and more popular, he started to consider parodying it, but he became reluctant after hearing the song, considering that spoofing "such an earnest human rights anthem" could be in bad taste, and also because a Lady Gaga parody was "what everybody in the universe was already assuming I would do, and I hate to be so predictable". Then Yankovic came to the idea of doing the spoof about Gaga herself, as he thought it "wasn't really going to offend anybody". Yankovic then "worked around the clock to get the lyrics out" and interrupted a family vacation to record a demo that could be used to ask for Gaga's approval.

== Approval by Lady Gaga ==
In April 2011, Yankovic reported that Lady Gaga refused him permission to release "Perform This Way", which he had hoped to use as the lead single for his upcoming album. Yankovic had originally sent the request to parody the song to Gaga's manager, who responded that they would need to see his lyrics to make an assessment. Yankovic was touring in Australia at the time, and hastily created the lyrics for approval. Yankovic further stated that Gaga's management insisted on reviewing a recorded version of the song, and he had cut a family vacation short to turn the recorded version around. Ultimately, he was told that she refused to allow the parody. Yankovic had considered the song key to his Alpocalypse album, but due to the rejection, he had begun the process to postpone its release until he could record a new song to take the place of "Perform This Way".

Following the refusal, he released his parody online on April 20, 2011, and encouraged donations to the Human Rights Campaign. Yankovic was initially fearful of parodying Gaga's song, considering it "an important gay-rights anthem", but had hit upon making the parody about Gaga's fashion, and tying in the sales of the song and video to charity as an act of "good karma" due to the human rights message of the original song.

Shortly after its upload to YouTube, word about the song spread among Yankovic's fans, primarily along Twitter, according to Yankovic, and the video had received over 2 million views. The word spread to Lady Gaga and her staff, and eventually it was discovered she herself had not yet heard the song and the refusal had come from Gaga's manager without her input. As Lady Gaga is "a huge Weird Al fan", she subsequently gave Yankovic the green light to include the song on his upcoming album and said she loved the parody. Lady Gaga later considered being parodied by Yankovic as a "rite of passage" for her musical career and considered the song "very empowering". Within a day of receiving permission to use the parody, Yankovic had reaffirmed the song's inclusion on Alpocalypse and was able to set the day of release for the album; Yankovic claimed that "Twitter saved my album". Regardless of Gaga's permission, Yankovic will still contribute sales of the song to charity.

== Music video ==
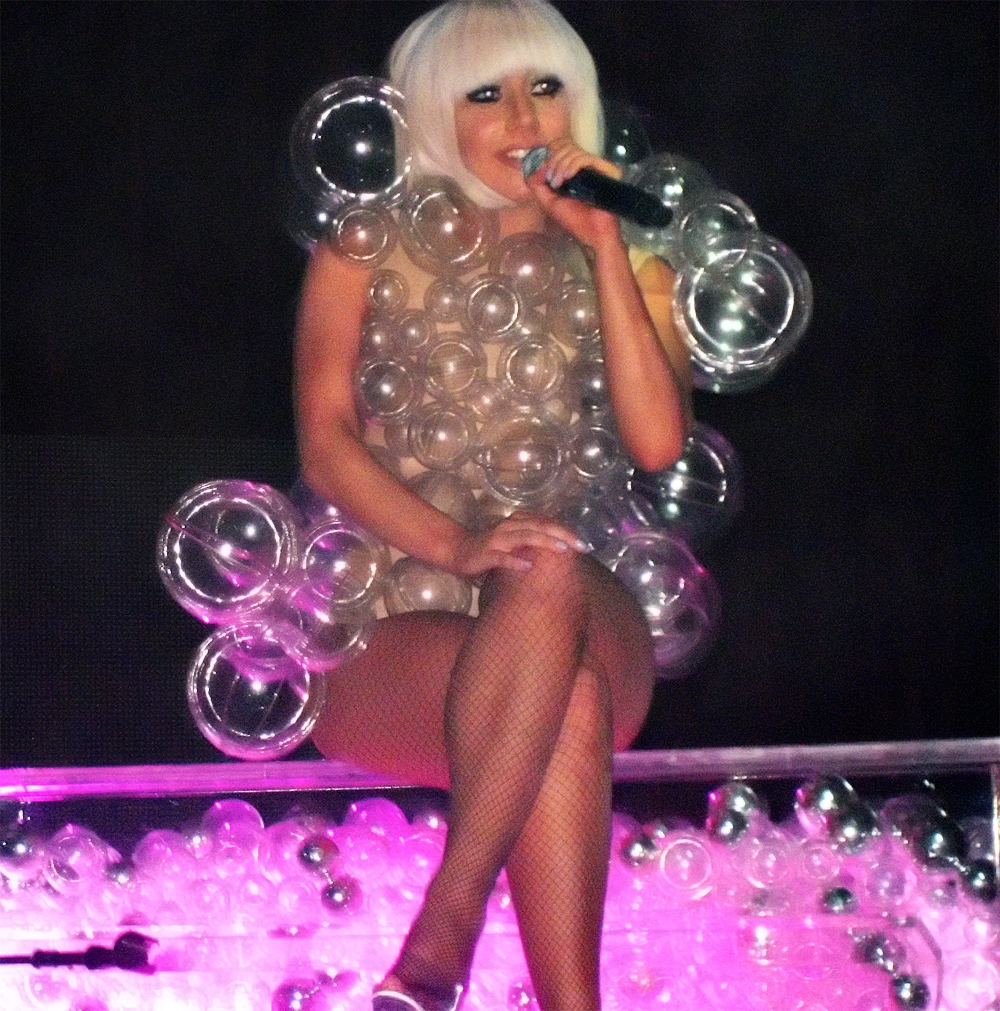
The "bubble dress" worn by Yankovic in the video (left) and by Gaga during The Fame Ball Tour (right)

Yankovic had confirmed that the song would have a video to be released along with the album that would be "beyond awesome, and disturbing on many levels". A thirty-second video teaser was released on June 17, 2011, and the video was released on June 20, 2011, on Vevo and YouTube. The video was shown on VH1 Online, AMTV and Jump Start. The video was directed by Yankovic himself, and features Al's head superimposed on the bodies of dancer Vlada Gorbaneva and contortionist Marissa Heart using CG effects.

Throughout the video, "Yankovic" dances in a number of different outlandish outfits, some inspired by the song's lyrics such as a gold lamé straitjacket, while others are parodies of outfits that Lady Gaga has worn, such as her meat dress and a dress made out of bubbles for The Fame Ball Tour. One of the outfits, a peacock costume, is worn by Yankovic on live performances of the song.

Yankovic found it a challenge to distill Gaga's public performances as "she's got so many different looks", and had difficulty "figuring out how we're going to do two dozen costumes in three minutes" for the video. Work on the video started immediately after Yankovic was able to affirm Gaga's permission for the parody, and was completed only days before its release on YouTube. The video includes a Madonna lookalike played by Holly Beavon, a reference to numerous comparisons between Madonna and Gaga's musical styles, and also to the similarities between "Born This Way" with Madonna's "Express Yourself".

Yankovic considered this his last big-budget video that he would produce. While the label fronted him the money to produce it, Yankovic had to pay that back through royalties. The cost was considerably high due to the large number of costumes involved, and Yankovic noted that record labels are not as flush with money as they used to be to fund extravagant videos.

At the 54th Annual Grammy Awards, the video was nominated in the category of Best Short Form Music Video.

== See also ==
- "Weird Al" Yankovic discography
- List of songs recorded by "Weird Al" Yankovic
