= Paper Trail =

Studio album by T.I.
- Released: September 30, 2008
- Recorded: 2007–2008
- Genre: Hip hop
- Length: 73:15
- Labels: Grand Hustle; Atlantic
- Producers: Chuck Diesel; Nard & B; Rob Knox; The Runners; Danja; Toomp; Drumma Boy; Kanye West; Lil' C; Polow da Don; Jim Jonsin; Just Blaze; J.U.S.T.I.C.E. League; Timbaland; Tha Bizness; Khao; Swizz Beatz; Blac Elvis; Two Band Geeks

T.I. chronology
T.I. vs. T.I.P. (2007)	Paper Trail (2008)	No Mercy (2010)

Singles from Paper Trail
- 1. "No Matter What" Released: April 29, 2008; 2. "Whatever You Like" Released: July 29, 2008; 3. "Swing Ya Rag" Released: August 26, 2008; 4. "What Up, What's Haapnin'" Released: September 2, 2008; 5. "Swagga Like Us" Released: September 6, 2008; 6. "Live Your Life" Released: September 16, 2008; 7. "Ready for Whatever" Released: September 23, 2008; 8. "Dead and Gone" Released: January 13, 2009

Paper Trail is the sixth studio album by American rapper T.I., released September 30, 2008, on Grand Hustle Records and Atlantic Records. He began to write songs for the album as he awaited trial for federal weapons and possession charges. Unlike his past albums, he wrote his lyrics down on paper, which he had not done since his debut album, I'm Serious (2001).

The album features guest appearances from rappers Jay-Z, Kanye West, Lil Wayne, M.I.A. and Ludacris, along with singers Rihanna, Justin Timberlake, Usher and John Legend, among others. The production on the album was handled by many high-profile record producers, including Nard & B, Rob Knox, Danja, The Runners, Toomp, Drumma Boy, Kanye West, Lil' C, Polow da Don, Jim Jonsin, Just Blaze, J.U.S.T.I.C.E. League, Timbaland, Tha Bizness, Khao, Swizz Beatz, Blac Elvis and many more.

The album debuted atop the US Billboard 200, selling 568,000 units and receiving gold certification by the Recording Industry Association of America (RIAA) in its first week. Critical responses to the album were generally favorable reviews from critics. It spawned eight singles, four of which peaked within the top five of the Billboard Hot 100, with two singles peaking at number one.

== Background and recording ==
On November 12, 2007, while awaiting a trial for federal weapons charges, T.I. announced he had been writing songs for a new album to be entitled Paper Trail. He wrote his lyrics down on paper, which he had not done since his debut album, I'm Serious. The album highlights his "fear, anger and guilt" as he awaited trial.

T.I. recorded nearly 100 tracks during the production for Paper Trail, including a collaboration with Fall Out Boy on a track entitled "Out in the Cold". However the song was left out of the final cut, but T.I. told MTV that he may add some of the cut tracks to his next album. On August 22, 2008, the songs "Like I Do" featuring The-Dream, "Let My Beat Pound", "My Life Your Entertainment" featuring Usher, and "Swagga Like Us" were all leaked online.

The album was scheduled to be released in September 2008, but was subsequently moved up to an August 12 after the release of the promotional and lead single "No Matter What" and high demand of the album. At the time, T.I. said that the first single may have been "Top of the World", originally featuring B.o.B and Ludacris, explaining that the song was "a reflective song about our humble beginnings and how far we've come". The album was pushed back for a release date of September 2, then September 9 and to its final release date of September 30, 2008, in the US. The album was first released on September 29, 2008, in continental Europe.

== Promotion ==
"No Matter What"
In the album's first single, the song narrates T.I. rising above his misfortunes, including a prison sentence for weapons charges.

"Whatever You Like"
In the second single, T.I. melodically raps along a beat of lead synthesizers and drum pattern.

The first single released from the album was a song titled "No Matter What". It was posted on StreetCred's website on April 29, 2008, as a promotional recording, then released as a single on May 6, along with a music video, which he premiered on MTV's FNMTV. The song narrates T.I. rising above his misfortunes, including a prison sentence for weapon charges.

On August 19, 2008, the album's lead single "Whatever You Like", was made available for digital download. The song reached number one on the Billboard Hot 100 on September 6, 2008, and set a new record for biggest one-week jump to the top position, going from number seventy-one to number one, becoming his first number one song on the chart as a lead artist and best opening-week sales by a rap track since Nielsen SoundScan began compiling download data in 2003. T.I. announced that he was "ecstatic" and "overjoyed" after setting a record for the biggest jump to top of the Billboard Hot 100.

After the success of "Whatever You Like", iTunes published the release dates for the upcoming singles, "Swing Ya Rag" on August 26, "What Up, What's Haapnin'" on September 2, and "Ready for Whatever" on September 23, 2008. Additionally, a song titled "Swagga Like Us", featuring T.I., Jay-Z, Lil Wayne and Kanye West - which samples "Paper Planes" by M.I.A. - was then released as a single on September 4, for Paper Trail and debuted in the Hot 100 at number five.

The album's seventh single, "Live Your Life" featuring Rihanna, broke T.I's own record for biggest leap to number one, when it jumped from number eighty to number one on the Hot 100, giving T.I. his second Hot 100 number one as a lead artist, and Rihanna her fifth overall. The song also set a first week digital record, when it sold 334,000 digital downloads in its first week of availability, a record that was previously held by Mariah Carey's "Touch My Body."

The eighth single was confirmed to be "Dead and Gone" featuring Justin Timberlake, by the song's co-producer Rob Knox. T.I. himself later confirmed the release of the single. The song was charted by Billboard before the announcement of the single. The song reached number two on the Billboard Hot 100 on February 27, 2009. Overall, eight songs from the album charted on the Billboard Hot 100, including "56 Bars (Intro)", "I'm Illy" and "My Life Your Entertainment", despite not being singles. A music video was released for the song "Slide Show" which highlighted a photo collage that followed T.I.'s career as a recording artist. The track "Every Chance I Get" was featured on the promotional trailer for Armored starring Columbus Short.

== Critical reception ==
Professional ratings
Aggregate scores
Source	Rating
Metacritic	74/100
Review scores
Source	Rating
AllMusic	3.5/5 stars
The A.V. Club	B+
Blender	3.5/5 stars
Entertainment Weekly	B+
The Guardian	3/5 stars
MSN Music (Consumer Guide)	A−
Pitchfork	6.2/10
Rolling Stone	3/5 stars
Slant Magazine	3/5 stars
USA Today	3.5/4 stars

Paper Trail was met with positive reviews. At Metacritic, which assigns a normalized rating out of 100 to reviews from mainstream critics, the album received an average score of 74, based on 19 reviews, which indicates "generally favorable reviews". Several critics praised the production on the album; Andy Kellman of AllMusic noted that DJ Toomp's and Danja's production appearance provided "some much needed punch", which placed the album above T.I.'s previous album, T.I. vs. T.I.P.. Margeaux Watson of Entertainment Weekly said that the "outstanding production" proved that T.I. "still knows how to have a good time". Wilson McBee of Slant Magazine called the songs produced by Toomp the "vintage T.I.", describing the sound as "ecstasies of sweltering synth lines, ground-shaking 808 patterns and breathless verbalizing". However, McBee felt that the songs that were directly about T.I.'s prison sentence for weapons charges ("No Matter What", "Ready for Whatever") were among the weakest on the album, saying that "admitting guilt, making excuses and expressing no regrets falls flat". Sharing a similar sentiment, Jody Rosen of Rolling Stone called the songs "mostly dispenses with the Tupac-wannabe gangsta-confessor pretensions to deliver catchy, tight, bombastic pop-rap alongside a who's-who of megastar guests", saying that T.I. was a "well-oiled hit machine who's more fun than deep".

Newsday's Glen Gamboa gave Paper Trail a B rating and commented that "[T.I.] is still bouncing between pop-leaning hip-hop anthems [...] and spare, often violent, tales of crime and brutality". Michael Saba of Paste said that, "Even with the burden of sloppy crossover tracks, Paper Trail has enough standout moments for T.I.’s throne to remain secure for now." Shannon Barbour of About.com said that, "Regardless of the outcome of reality, Paper Trail is a solid combination of rhyme, repentance, swagger and substance." People magazine gave the album four out of four stars, saying that the album was "a near-perfect hip-hop album for 2008." In his consumer guide for MSN Music, critic Robert Christgau called Paper Trail an "expediently excessive piece of rich-get-richer" and gave it an A− rating, indicating "the kind of garden-variety good record that is the great luxury of musical micromarketing and overproduction. Anyone open to its aesthetic will enjoy more than half its tracks".

== Commercial performance ==
According to Nielsen SoundScan, Paper Trail sold 357,000 copies in the United States in the first three days of its release. Ultimately, the album debuted at number one on the US Billboard 200 chart, selling 568,000 copies in its first week. This became T.I.'s third consecutive US number one debut and the fourth highest debut of 2008. In its second week, the album remained at number one on the chart, selling an additional 177,000 copies. In its third week, the album dropped to number two on the chart, selling 131,000 more copies. In its fourth week, the album dropped to number three, selling 93,427 copies. The album ended up spending a total of 55 weeks on the chart. On August 26, 2009, the album was certified double platinum by the Recording Industry Association of America for sales of over two million copies.

== Track listing ==
No.	Title	Writer(s)	Producer(s)	Length
1.	"56 Bars (Intro)"	Clifford Harris, Jr.; Aldrin Davis	DJ Toomp	3:02
2.	"I'm Illy"	Harris, Jr.; Charles "Chuck Diesel" Spencer	Chuck Diesel	4:07
3.	"Ready for Whatever"	Harris, Jr.; Christopher Gholson; Rodney Hill, Jr.; Monica Arnold	Drumma Boy	5:12
4.	"On Top of the World" (featuring B.o.B & Ludacris)	Harris, Jr.; James "Nard" Rosser; Brandon "B" Rackley; Christopher Bridges; Bobby Simmons, Jr.	Nard & B	5:00
5.	"Live Your Life" (featuring Rihanna)	Harris, Jr.; Justin Smith; Makeba Riddick; Dan Balan	Just Blaze; Makeba Riddick	5:39
6.	"Whatever You Like"	Harris, Jr.; James Scheffer; David Siegel	Jim Jonsin	4:10
7.	"No Matter What"	Harris, Jr.; Nathaniel Hills	Danja	5:16
8.	"My Life Your Entertainment" (featuring Usher)	Harris, Jr.; Gholson; Theron Thomas; Timothy Thomas; Kassim Washington	Drumma Boy	4:57
9.	"Porn Star" (featuring Ricco Barrino)	Harris, Jr.; Washington; Cordale Quinn	Lil' C	3:32
10.	"Swing Ya Rag" (featuring Swizz Beatz)	Harris, Jr.; Kasseem Dean; Avery Chambliss; Joseph Alexander	Swizz Beatz; The Individualz	3:18
11.	"What Up, What's Haapnin'"	Harris, Jr.; Gholson; Harvey Mason Sr.	Drumma Boy	5:01
12.	"Every Chance I Get"	Harris, Jr.; Davis	DJ Toomp	4:50
13.	"Swagga Like Us" (with Jay-Z featuring Kanye West, Lil Wayne & M.I.A.)	Harris, Jr.; Shawn Carter; Kanye West; Dwayne Carter, Jr.; Maya Arulpragasam; Nicolas Headon; Michael Jones; John Mellor; Wesley Pentz; Paul Simonon	Kanye West; Mike Caren (add.)	5:28
14.	"Slide Show" (featuring John Legend)	Harris, Jr; Jamal Jones; Simmons, Jr.; Elvis "Blac Elvis" Williams	Polow da Don; Blac Elvis	3:43
15.	"You Ain't Missin' Nothing"	Harris, Jr.; Gholson	Drumma Boy	5:10
16.	"Dead and Gone" (featuring Justin Timberlake)	Harris, Jr.; Justin Timberlake; Robin Tadross	Justin Timberlake; Rob Knox	5:00

United Kingdom (bonus tracks)
No.	Title	Length
17.	"I Know You Missed Me"	3:14

iTunes bonus tracks
No.	Title	Writer(s)	Producer(s)	Length
17.	"Collect Call" (featuring Mitchelle'l)	Harris, Jr.; Mitchelle'l Sium; Rosser; Rackley	Nard & B	4:38
18.	"I Know You Missed Me"	Harris, Jr.; Wook Kim; Elliot Stroud	Two Band Geeks	3:12

Paper Trail: Case Closed
No.	Title	Writer(s)	Producer(s)	Length
1.	"Live Your Life" (featuring Rihanna)	Harris, Jr.; Justin Smith; Makeba Riddick; Dan Balan	Just Blaze; Makeba Riddick	5:39
2.	"Dead and Gone" (featuring Justin Timberlake)	Harris, Jr.; Justin Timberlake; Robin Tadross	Justin Timberlake; Rob Knox	5:00
3.	"Whatever You Like"	Harris, Jr.; James Scheffer; David Siegel	Jim Jonsin	4:12
4.	"Remember Me" (featuring Mary J. Blige)	Harris, Jr.; Ester Dean; Jamal Jones; Jason Perry	Polow Da Don; Jason Perry	4:05
5.	"Hell of a Life"			4:17

Notes

- (add.) Additional production
- "Whatever You Like" and "Porn Star" features additional vocals performed by Ricco Barrino
- "Collect Call" features additional vocals performed by Mitchelle'l
- "Ready for Whatever" uses the same beat from "Thugs Need Love Too" by Rocko.

Sample credits

- "Live Your Life" contains elements and samples of "Dragostea Din Tei" performed by O-Zone.
- "Swagga Like Us" contains samples and elements of "Paper Planes" performed by M.I.A.

== Personnel ==
- Darren Ankenman – photography
- Carol Briselli – viola (track 16)
- Greg Gigendad Burke – art direction, design
- Mike Caren – additional music producer (track 13)
- Elliott Carter – recording engineer (tracks 1–11, 14–15), assistant
- Jeff Chestek – string section recording engineer (track 16)
- Eliza Cho – violin (track 16)
- James J. Cooper III – cello (track 16)
- Andrew Dawson – audio mixing (track 13)
- Chuck Diesel – producer (track 2)
- DJ Toomp – producer (tracks 1, 12)
- Canei Finch – additional keyboards (track 5)
- Ghislaine Fleishman – violin (track 16)
- Gary Fly – audio mixing assistant (tracks 1, 12)
- Paul Foley – recording engineer (tracks 5, 16)
- John Frazier Jr. – producer (track 3, 11)
- John Frye – audio mixing (tracks 1, 12)
- Lanre Gaba – A&R
- Chris Gehringer – mastering
- Jason Geter – executive producer, A&R
- Christopher "Drumma Boy" Gholson – producer (tracks 3, 8, 11, 15)
- Larry Gold – conductor, string arrangements (track 16)
- Rob Gold – producer
- Josh Gudwin – assistant recording engineer (track 16), recording engineer (12)
- Brad "Dirt" Horne – recording engineer (track 6, 8), assistant
- Jean-Marie Horvat – audio mixing (track 16)
- Bryan Huynh – technician
- The Individuals – producer (track 10)
- Jim Jonsin – producer (track 6)
- Just Blaze – instrumental producer (track 5)
- Hannah Kang – A&R
- Billy Kim – producer
- Rob Knox – producer (track 16)
- Khoa Truong – engineer
- Keke Smith – production coordinator (track 1,12)
- Emma Kummrow – violin (track 16)
- Kevin "Coach K" Lee – co-executive producer, A&R
- Lil' C – producer (track 9)
- Sydney Margetson – photography
- Robert Marks – recording engineer, audio mixing (track 6)
- Orlando McGhee – A&R
- Darryl Morris – assistant recording engineer (track 8)
- Peter Nocella – viola (track 16)
- Bill Orcutt – cover illustration
- Anthony Palazzole – assistant recording engineer (track 6)
- Douglas Peterson – A&R
- Rosie Phillidor – stylist
- Brandon "B" Rackley – producer (track 4)
- Makeba Riddick – vocal producer (track 5)
- James "Nard" Rosser – producer, recording engineer (track 4)
- Marsha St. Hubert – A&R
- Stevie Salas – guitar (track 16)
- Terrell Sass – Drums, Composer (track 15)
- Ray Seay – audio mixing (tracks 2–4, 8–9, 11, 14)
- Derrick Selby – recording engineer (track 1)
- David Siegel – additional keyboards (track 6)
- Rawle Stewart – co–executive producer
- Elliott Storud – producer
- Supa Engineer "Duro" (Ken Ifill) – audio mixing (track 10)
- Swizz Beatz – producer, vocals (track 10)
- Tom Syrowski – audio mixing assistant (track 16)
- Igor Szwec – violin (track 16)
- Gregory Teperman – violin (track 16)
- Justin Timberlake – producer, vocals (track 16)
- T.I.P. – executive producer
- Kanye West – producer, vocals (track 13)
- Ryan West – audio mixing (track 5)
- Elvis Williams – producer (track 14)
- Andrew Wright – tracking
- Ian Wright – cover illustration

== Charts ==
=== Weekly charts ===
Chart (2008–09)	Peak position
Australian Albums (ARIA)	16
Belgian Albums (Ultratop Flanders)	86
Canadian Albums (Billboard)	2
Dutch Albums (Album Top 100)	60
French Albums (SNEP)	51
German Albums (Offizielle Top 100)	79
Irish Albums (IRMA)	34
Japanese Albums (Oricon)	14
New Zealand Albums (RMNZ)	9
Norwegian Albums (VG-lista)	34
Scottish Albums (Official Charts)	55
Swiss Albums (Schweizer Hitparade)	46
UK Albums (Official Charts)	42
US Billboard 200	1
US Top R&B/Hip-Hop Albums (Billboard)	1
US Top Rap Albums (Billboard)	1

=== Year-end charts ===
Chart (2008)	Position
Australian Albums (ARIA)	91
New Zealand Albums (RMNZ)	50
US Billboard 200	23
US Top R&B/Hip-Hop Albums (Billboard)	5

Chart (2009)	Position
UK Albums (OCC)	193
US Billboard 200	26
US Top R&B/Hip-Hop Albums (Billboard)	11

== Certifications ==
Region	Certification	Certified units/sales
Australia (ARIA)	Gold	35,000^{^}
Canada (Music Canada)	Platinum	80,000^{^}
New Zealand (RMNZ)	3× Platinum	45,000^{‡}
United Kingdom (BPI)	Gold	100,000^{^}
United States (RIAA)	4× Platinum	4,000,000^{‡}
^{^} Shipments figures based on certification alone.^{‡} Sales+streaming figures based on certification alone.
