= SuperNews! =

Television series

- Genre: satire, political humour
- Created by: Josh Faure-Brac
- Starring: Josh Faure-Brac
- Theme music composer: Ghetto Blaster
- Country of origin: United States
- Original language: English
- No. of seasons: 2
- No. of episodes: 67

Production
- Running time: 5-30 minutes
- Production company: Current TV

Original release
- Network: Current TV
- Release: August 19, 2005 – January 28, 2010

SuperNews! was a half-hour, satirical animated television series that aired on Current TV 2005–2010. It was created by Josh Faure-Brac, who also wrote for the show and performed the majority of male voices. The show was primarily based on popular culture satire and political humor. Frequent characters included animated interpretations of such mainstream figures as President of the United States Barack Obama, Vice President Joe Biden, Hillary Clinton, Senator John McCain, and various pop-culture icons and celebrities such as Lindsay Lohan, Perez Hilton, and Britney Spears. 67 episodes were produced.

== History ==
Josh Faure-Brac created the pilot for SuperNews! in 2005 which was developed to appear with the launch of the new cable network Current TV and subsequently all of the art and animation was created by Faure-Brac and Steven K. L. Olson until 2006. Faure-Brac and Olson were then joined by animator Dustin McLean (of literal music video) who later became assistant director for the show. SuperNews! episodes (short-form segments) aired in Current TV's "shuffle" rotation.

In March 2009, as Current TV started shifting to more traditional 30-minute programming, the show transitioned to a full half-hour program consisting of several shorts married together by thematic transitions. During these transitions, the show's logo and mascot Earf would appear in very brief scenes that often related to the previous or upcoming segment.

Season 2 premiered on November 12, 2009.

SuperNews! formerly aired every Thursday night on Current TV at 11:00 P.M./10:00 P.M. Central

SuperNews! was cancelled on May 12, 2010.

== Episode list ==
| Date | Number of episode | Title |
|---|---|---|
| 08.19.05 | 1 | Davos |
| 08.19.05 | 2 | Rove |
| 08.27.05 | 3 | Bolton |
| 09.12.05 | 4 | Pat Robertson |
| 09.20.05 | 5 | Hurricane Katrina |
| 10.05.05 | 6 | Iraqi Constitution Club |
| 10.22.05 | 7 | GOP in Jeopardy |
| 11.10.05 | 8 | Operation Omega Pattern B |
| 11.22.05 | 9 | The Story of Thanksgiving |
| 12.17.05 | 10 | I'm Dreaming of a Warm Christmas |
| 01.23.06 | 11 | The Gods Must Be Bowling |
| 02.04.06 | 12 | State of the Union |
| 02.16.06 | 13 | Wire Tappin'! |
| 02.18.06 | 14 | Cheney Shooting: The Quail Speaks! |
| 03.09.06 | 15 | Brokeback White House |
| 03.28.06 | 16 | The Wacky Trial of Saddam Hussein |
| 04.10.06 | 17 | MySpace and K-Fed |
| 04.29.06 | 18 | The Immigration Debate |
| 05.20.06 | 19 | Oprah Drops a Da Vinci Load |
| 05.31.06 | 20 | Low Ratings of the Season Finale |
| 06.16.06 | 21 | Iran: Deal Or No Deal? |
| 07.06.06 | 22 | A Night With Ann Coulter |
| 07.22.06 | 23 | Bush and Blair's Candid Moment |
| 09.28.06 | 24 | Osama Bin Lohan |
| 10.17.06 | 25 | Star-Spangled Terror |
| 11.01.06 | 26 | You Gotta Vote |
| 11.04.06 | 27 | Joke Botchin' John Kerry |
| 11.13.06 | 28 | The K-Fed Effect |
| 11.22.06 | 29 | Jackass: N. Korea |
| 12.20.06 | 30 | Christmas Wars |
| 01.13.07 | 31 | Iraq Speech Outtakes |
| 01.24.07 | 32 | Revenge of the Nerds |
| 01.27.07 | 33 | State Of The Union |
| 02.14.07 | 34 | Gates vs. Jobs |
| 03.09.07 | 35 | The (Oval) Office |
| 04.24.07 | 36 | Perez Hilton Show |
| 05.03.07 | 37 | First Dem Debate '08 |
| 05.12.07 | 38 | First Repub Debate '08 |
| 06.05.07 | 39 | Shawskank Redemption |
| 06.21.07 | 40 | Entourage D.C. |
| 06.23.07 | 41 | Mike Gravel Rocks! |
| 07.11.07 | 42 | Transformers: Revenge of the Fallen? |
| 08.11.07 | 43 | Super Tube Debate |
| 09.12.07 | 44 | The Hills |
| 09.18.07 | 45 | Miss Teen President |
| 09.27.07 | 46 | Oh That Mahmoud |
| 10.3.07 | 47 | Goodbye, Mr. Rove |
| 10.16.07 | 48 | My Dinner with Bill O' |
| 10.25.07 | 49 | White House Halloween Party |
| 12.6.07 | 50 | Becks Strikes the USA |
| 12.18.07 | 51 | It's a Horrible Life |
| 01.06.07 | 52 | Rambo vs. Terror (Part 1) |
| 01.31.08 | 53 | Rambo vs. Terror (Part 2) |
| 02.24.08 | 54 | Rambo vs. Terror (Part 3) |
| 02.27.08 | 55 | The Democratic Messiah |
| 03.15.08 | 56 | Spitzer Blows It |
| 04.16.08 | 57 | Blue Collar Hillary |
| 04.17.08 | 58 | Texting Your Way to Love |
| 04.22.08 | 59 | Social Networking Wars |
| 05.16.08 | 60 | American Ap-perv-el |
| 07.1.08 | 61 | Hipsters in Space |
| 07.26.08 | 62 | Mugged At The Gas Station |
| 08.18.08 | 63 | Socrates on Phelps |
| 09.3.08 | 64 | McCain's VP Rejects |
| 09.8.08 | 65 | Supernews Does The Internet (half-hour special) |
| 09.11.08 | 66 | Uncle Sam & 9/11 |
| 09.12.08 | 67 | Internet Porn & You |
| 10.17.08 | 68 | Top Gov |
| 01.17.09 | 69 | George Calling Orson |

=== Half-hour episodes ===
==== 1st season ====
| Date | Number of episode | Title | 1st video | 2nd video | 3rd video | 4th video | 5th video | 6th video |
|---|---|---|---|---|---|---|---|---|
| 3.20.09 | 1 | The Death of MTV | Obama Hits the AIG Spot | Twouble with Twitters* | Rachel Maddow's and Anderson Cooper's Hot Date | MTV Down | Friend Request: Hookin' Up | Lobster Abs |
| 3.27.09 | 2 | Return of the Jabba | Jabba the Rush* | Ex-Texting | Project Britney | The Craigslist Genie | | |
| 4.3.09 | 3 | It's Gotta Be Swexty | The Glenn Beck Apocalypse | Evite Master* | Life On Mars... Is Gay! | The Instant DJ Toolbox | Larry King's Spicy Interview | Friend Request: Delete a friend |
| 4.10.09 | 4 | Totally Up Our Own Asses | Euro-Bama | Texting Your Way Through Work | Hipsters in Space: Judgementotron | Going Green | Project Britney: Future Britney | The Craigslist Genie: Missed Connections |
| 4.17.09 | 5 | SuperNews! Recycles | Gates vs. Jobs | SuperNews! Recycles Some Crap | Jimmy Does Rambo | Transformers: Revenge of the Fallen? | fragment of I'm Dreaming of a Warm Christmas | The Great Immigration Debate of 1621 |
| 5.1.09 | 6 | We've Been Tea-Bagged | Swine Flu Panic!!! | Your Dad asks Computer Questions | Using Pets to Get You Laid | The War on Terror of 1776 | Hot Three-Way Action | |
| 5.8.09 | 7 | I Don't Wanna Go Bowling | Celebrity Twitter Overkill | Texting Your Way Through Friday Night | Hipsters in Space: Fashion Edition | The IKEA Relationship | Larry King Interviews Yoga Expert | Passive Aggressive E-mail Boxing* |
| 5.17.09 | 8 | Strippers? Hookers? Hair Gel? | Dick goes Waterboarding | Friend Request: Stalker | Larry King Interviews the Hadron Collider | The Divine Comedy of Vegas | DilDos and DilDon'ts | Gorgon the Awkward Alien |
| 5.22.09 | 9 | The End of Television | Adam Lambert's Duet With Susan Boyle* | Friend Request: Chat Windows* | Homeless TV | Project Britney: Perez Hilton | Larry King on Larry King* | What's Your Fantasy?* |
| 5.29.09 | 10 | SuperNews! Best Of Season One | 5th The Instant DJ Toolbox* | 4th Your Dad asks Computer Questions* | 3rd MTV Down* | Six Degrees of SuperNews! | 2nd Emoticons War* | 1st Twouble with Twitters* |

==== 2nd season ====
| Date | Number of episode | Title | 1st video | 2nd video | 3rd video | 4th video | 5th video | 6th video | 7th Video |
|---|---|---|---|---|---|---|---|---|---|
| 11.12.09 | 11 | Rise of the Stupids | Obama Aborts Abortion | Douchey-Doo!: The Mystery of the VIP List | Emoticons Have Cybersex* | The Stupid Virus | Texting While Driving | Uncle Sam & Lady Liberty on Immigration | |
| 11.19.09 | 12 | Twilight of the Vampires | Parasailin' With Sarah Palin | Linked In...to what? | The Obamas: After Dark | Vampires: Hollywood Bloodsuckers | PSA: Stop Clam Jamming!* | Master Debaters: Pot v.s. Meth | |
| 12.03.09 | 13 | Soggy Doobies and Strippers | Obama's White House "Job" Fair | Gorgon Has Body Image Issues | Your Mom Has TiVo Questions | Smarmy Time With Bill Maher | Girlfriend Texts During Football* | Uncle Sam & Lady Liberty: Slave Memorial? | |
| 12.10.09 | 14 | Obama Googles Jesus | Obama's Awkward Peace Prize Ceremony | Hipster's In Space: Jihad is Rad | Dennis Miller 1989 v.s. Dennis Miller 2009 | The Google Toilet | TMZ: Jesus Gossip! | Spirit and Opportunity: Showdown on Mars | The Obamas: Bathroom Talk |
| 12.17.09 | 15 | The Christmas Bailout | Obama & Biden's "Drummer Boy" Duet | The Tale of The Dollar | The Dangers of Mass Texting | Uncle Sam & Lady Liberty: Indian Casino* | Weird Al Yankovic's "Ringtone"* | Santa Saves Christmas | |
| 1.14.10 | 16 | Say Halo to 2010! | The Return of the GOP | The Obamas: Date Night | The Death of MySpace | Larry King Interviews 2010 | Gorgon the Awkward Alien: Gym* | Gates vs. Jobs II | |
| 1.21.10 | 17 | Monoliths, Missiles and Pubes Oh My! | Obama Says F*ck It | Your Dad Asks iPhone Questions | A Hipster Space Odyssey | Uncle Sam's Throbbing Military | Outta Control Pubes | | |
| 1.28.10 | 18 | Douchebag Powers Activate! | Scott Brown has the Power | Douchey Doo! Pool Party Mystery | The First Halloween* | Memes of Memetasia | Socrates and Plato: Hot or Not | The Craigslist Genie: Casual Encounters | |

*Episode was earlier on the Internet

== Voice performers ==
Frequent voice performers are Josh Faure-Brac, Jason Nash, Natasha Leggero, Jordan Peele, Brian Shortall, Rebecca Sage Allen, Jonah Ray, Jerry Minor, Sarah Haskins.

== Between Seasons 1 and 2 ==
SuperNews! Collabo-Jam

Hosted by Josh Faure-Brac and "Weird Al" Yankovic, this Collabo-Jam Super Special includes Al and Josh's favorite clips from SuperNews! and some of Al's classic music videos. Plus, the world premiere of the new "Weird Al" music video, "Ringtone" from the Internet Leaks EP is animated by the SuperNews! team.

SuperNews! Classics

From August to October 2009, SuperNews! produced a compilation of previously released episodes from before it became a full-time show.

1. SuperNews! Has Sex! 08.06.09
2. Starring George W. Bush! 08.17.09
3. Josh's Classic Favorites 08.29.09
4. Political Moments in Time 09.12.09
5. The Real Divas of SuperNews! 09.19.09
6. Staff Picks 09.26.09
7. Scary S#@! 10.03.09
8. Pre-President Obama 10.10.09

Rambo vs. Terror was also recompiled and aired as a classic.

In October 2009, SuperNews! made a cartoon called The First Halloween, seemingly to explain the holiday in addition to their already explained Thanksgiving and Christmas.
