= Internet Leaks =

EP by "Weird Al" Yankovic
- Released: August 25, 2009
- Recorded: September 29, 2008; April 21, 2009
- Genres: Comedy, parody
- Length: 19:19
- Labels: Volcano; Way Moby
- Producer: "Weird Al" Yankovic

"Weird Al" Yankovic chronology
Straight Outta Lynwood (2006)	Internet Leaks (2009)	The Essential "Weird Al" Yankovic (2009)

Singles from Internet Leaks
- 1. "Whatever You Like" Released: October 8, 2008; 2. "Craigslist" Released: June 16, 2009; 3. "Skipper Dan" Released: July 14, 2009; 4. "CNR" Released: August 4, 2009; 5. "Ringtone" Released: August 25, 2009

Internet Leaks is the second E.P. released by the American parody musician "Weird Al" Yankovic. Released digitally on August 25, 2009, its lead single is a parody of "Whatever You Like" by T.I. For Yankovic, the E.P. was an experiment in using the internet as a way to release music in an efficient and timely manner. As a result, the lead single, "Whatever You Like", references the Great Recession of 2008. The E.P. also contains style parodies of the Doors, Weezer, the White Stripes and Queen. All of the songs except for "Ringtone" had been released as separate digital singles between October 2008 and August 2009, preceding the record's release.

Music videos for the four original songs were animated and subsequently released by the time the E.P. was available for download, and a music video for "Whatever You Like" was released on the deluxe edition of Yankovic's 2011 album Alpocalypse. The songs on the album were mostly met with positive critical reception, and many critics were complimentary of Yankovic's style parodies. Upon its release, Internet Leaks charted at number 8 on the Billboard Top Comedy Albums, and on December 2, 2009, the E.P. was nominated for Grammy Award for Best Comedy Album for the 52nd Grammy Awards. In 2011, all five tracks on this E.P. were re-released on Yankovic's album Alpocalypse.

== Background and recording ==
Following 2006's Straight Outta Lynwood, Yankovic decided to explore digital distribution as a means to promote his music. In late 2008, he announced plans to release a parody of "Whatever You Like" by artist T.I. In October 2008, Yankovic told Billboard that he had come up with the idea two weeks before and that, with the benefit of digital distribution, he would not "have to wait around while my songs get old and dated—[he could] get them out on the Internet almost immediately." The single was recorded on September 29, 2008, and was exclusively uploaded to iTunes on October 8 before it was available to other digital distribution platforms two weeks later.

On April 21, 2009, Yankovic entered the studio to record four original songs: "Craigslist", "Skipper Dan", "CNR", and "Ringtone". The session was produced by Yankovic. Backing him were Jon "Bermuda" Schwartz on drums, Steve Jay on bass, and Jim West on guitar. For "Craigslist", the singer reached out to Ray Manzarek, the former keyboardist for the Doors, in order to properly authenticate the sound of his tribute. Following Manzarek's death on May 20, 2013, Yankovic later uploaded a video of Manzarek recording his part in the studio.

Yankovic first announced the EP on August 20, 2009, although each song but "Ringtone" (which was released on the same day as Internet Leaks) had been made available as singles preceding the release of the EP. All of the songs featured on Internet Leaks were later included on Yankovic's thirteenth studio album, Alpocalypse. The EP was meant as a stop-gap, because he "wanted to make the tracks available so everybody could enjoy them as early as possible."

== Composition ==
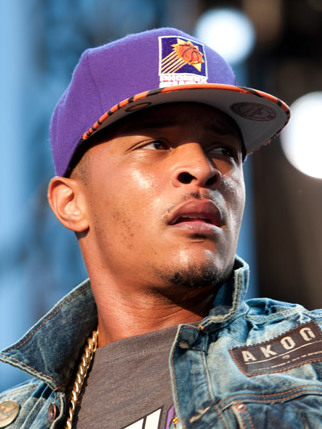
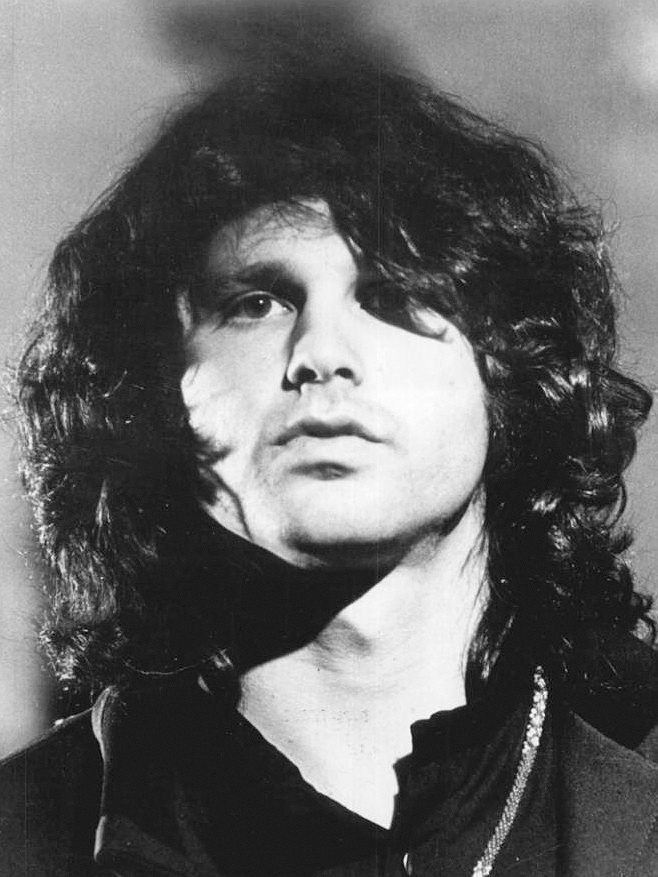
The album contains a parody of "Whatever You Like" by T.I. (left) and a style parody of the Doors (right, Jim Morrison pictured), among others.

The first single released from Internet Leaks was, "Whatever You Like" a parody of T.I.'s song of the same name. The song describes a man wooing his girlfriend amid financial hardships. Due to the speed with which Yankovic was able to write and record the parody, the song was more topical than many of Yankovic's other parodies. The song explicitly references the Great Recession, which started in 2008 and worsened in 2009.

Following "Whatever You Like", Yankovic released "Craigslist" on June 16, 2009. The song discussing the dealings of the titular website. Musically, the song is inspired by the sound of the Doors. As a "style parody", the song does not take directly from any single Doors song, but Yankovic transposed parts from various songs and combined them into what became "Craigslist". According to NPR, the intro organ riffs are similar to "When the Music's Over", the "snotty barista" section is "a pitch-perfect rip" of the Oedipus complex section from "The End", and there are sections in the guitar solo similar to "Light My Fire".

"Skipper Dan", a style parody of Weezer, was released on July 14, 2009. The song describes a man who has a fine arts degree and dreamed of pursuing an acting career, but is forced to work as a tour guide on the Jungle Cruise ride at Disneyland. Yankovic later explained in an interview with The A.V. Club that the song was "a bit more poignant [and] bittersweet [...] than what I usually write." He was inspired to write the song after going on a ride on the Disneyland Jungle Cruise with his family. During the cruise, one of the tour guides referred to his failed acting career. Yankovic then noted that "the bells went off in my head, and I thought, 'Well, here's a song right here.'"

On August 4, 2009, Yankovic released "CNR", a pastiche of the musical style of the White Stripes, with Rolling Stone specifically noting the influence of the 2007 single "Icky Thump". The lyrics are about superhuman feats that Charles Nelson Reilly could accomplish, retold in a style similar to Chuck Norris facts. The final single, "Ringtone", released on August 25, 2009, is a style parody of Queen. Billboard described the song as a cross between "Queen's operatic style [and] a tragic tale of a 'stupid ringtone' driving everyone nuts."

== Music videos ==
The first music video released was for the track "Craigslist", directed by Liam Lynch. The budget for the video was much lower than Yankovic's previous live-action video "White & Nerdy" and was shot in Lynch's garage. Yankovic stated that the low budget video "dovetails well" with the concept of the song. The video incorporates similar imagery seen in the Doors' videos, including stock footage and art house effects. Yankovic dressed as Morrison, having to lose some weight to look like the singer at age 24, and performed in front of a green screen to allow effects to be added afterward.

An animated video for "Skipper Dan" was directed by Divya Srinivasan and was released in July 2009. In early August of the same year, a video for "CNR", directed and animated by JibJab, was released. The animation used JibJab employees as actors against a green screen. It was interspersed with shots of Yankovic and Jon "Bermuda" Schwartz performing on a White Stripes-inspired red-and-white set, dressed as Jack White and Meg White, respectively. In a first for any major recording artist, users of Jib-Jab's web site had the option of including themselves in the music video. In mid August, a music video for "Ringtone" was animated by SuperNews!. Finally, a music video for "Whatever You Like" was created by animator Cris Shapan; the video was released in 2011 and appeared on the deluxe edition of Alpocalypse.

== Reception ==
The songs on the EP were favorably received. Cat Blackard of Consequence of Sound praised the manner in which "Whatever You Like" was released, noting that it was a "bold move", "a great way to keep up with the times", and that the resulting parody was topical. Matt Wild of the A.V. Club felt that the parody was "funny and pointed", although he noted that by the time of its 2011 re-release, the track was a little dated. Wild also felt that "Skipper Dan" was a stand-out, largely due to the fact that the song was an original written by Yankovic, and as such was not bound to the limits of any original song; Wild also positively complimented the song's darker nature.

The accuracy of the EP's style parodies was also positively critiqued. Andy Chalk of The Escapist magazine wrote that the music style of "Craigslist" was a "dead-on parody of The Doors", and Marc Hirsh of NPR argued that the composition and performance of "Craigslist" is evidence that Yankovic is a "stealth pop musicologist", being able to deconstruct a genre of work and recreate it into something new without it being unrecognizable. Wild wrote that "CNR" and "Ringtone" were both "even more winning" than the parodies found on Alpocalypse. Brian May, guitarist for Queen, felt that Yankovic "perfectly spoofed [the] vocal and guitar harmonies" of his band with "Ringtone".

The record was nominated for Best Comedy Album at the 52nd Grammy Awards.

== Track listing ==
Information taken from the liner notes of Alpocalypse.

No.	Title	Writer(s)	Parody of	Length
1.	"Whatever You Like"	Clifford Harris Jr., James Scheffer, David Siegel, Alfred Yankovic	"Whatever You Like" by T.I.	3:41
2.	"Craigslist"	Yankovic	Style parody of The Doors	4:53
3.	"Skipper Dan"	Yankovic	Style parody of Weezer	4:01
4.	"CNR"	Yankovic	Style parody of The White Stripes	3:21
5.	"Ringtone"	Yankovic	Style parody of Queen	3:25
Total length:				19:19

== Personnel ==
Information taken from iTunes metadata.

- "Weird Al" Yankovic – vocals, accordion, keyboards, backing vocals, hand claps
- Jim "Kimo" West – guitar, mandolin, banjo, keyboards, vocals, hand claps
- Steve Jay – bass guitar, banjo, vocals, hand claps
- Jon "Bermuda" Schwartz – drums, percussion, hand claps, drum programming, vocals
- Rubén Valtierra – keyboards on "Ringtone"
- Ray Manzarek – keyboards on "Craigslist"
- Brian Warwick – Engineer
- Tony Papa – Engineer
- Rafael Serrano – Engineer

== Charts ==
Chart (2011)	Peak position
US Billboard Top Comedy Albums	8
