= Craigslist (song) =

"Weird Al" Yankovic song

Single by "Weird Al" Yankovic

from the EP Internet Leaks and the album Alpocalypse
- Released: June 16, 2009
- Recorded: April 21, 2009
- Genre: Psychedelic rock; raga rock; heavy metal; art rock; spoken word; comedy; parody
- Length: 4:50
- Label: Volcano
- Songwriter: "Weird Al" Yankovic
- Producer: "Weird Al" Yankovic

"Weird Al" Yankovic singles chronology
"Whatever You Like" (2008)	"Craigslist" (2009)	"Skipper Dan" (2009)

Music video
- ”Craigslist” on YouTube

"Craigslist" is a song by American musician "Weird Al" Yankovic. It is a style parody of the Doors, and contains lyrics inspired by postings at the online classified advertising service, Craigslist. Yankovic described the idea of the song coming about thinking how it would be "anachronistically weird" for Jim Morrison to scream about Craigslist. Yankovic opted to use Craigslist as an example of something big in both the popular culture and his own life, and spent time exploring its listings to compose the lyrics. The song was released shortly after the closure of the Michael John Anderson (Craigslist Killer) case, a factor Yankovic considered "unfortunate timing".

Founding Doors member and keyboardist Ray Manzarek played keyboards on the studio recording of the song.

The single was the first of four new singles that were being released as part of the Internet Leaks EP. Craigslist was released digitally on June 16, 2009.

== Composition ==
As a "style parody", the song does not take directly from any single Doors tune, but instead transposes bits from various songs (especially from their first, self-titled album) and combines them. The intro guitar and organ riffs are similar to "Soul Kitchen" and "When the Music's Over", while the verses are reminiscent of "Twentieth Century Fox", "Hello, I Love You" and a short section of scat singing as in "Roadhouse Blues". Discrete sections in the guitar solo recall "When the Music's Over", "The End" and "Light My Fire".

== Personnel ==
Credits are adapted from the liner notes of Alpocalypse.

- "Weird Al" Yankovic – vocals
- Jim "Kimo" West – guitars
- Jon "Bermuda" Schwartz – drums and percussion
- Ray Manzarek – keyboards

== Reception ==
The music style of "Craigslist" has been considered to be a "dead-on parody of the Doors". Marc Hirsh of NPR noted that the composition and performance of "Craigslist" are evidence that Yankovic is a "Stealth Pop Musicologist", able to deconstruct a genre of work and recreate it into something new without being unrecognizable. Craigslist founder Craig Newmark, after being asked how he felt about the song, responded, "The thing's pretty funny!"

== Music video ==
The song has an associated video produced by Liam Lynch and was released on the same day as the single, though AOL previewed the video a day before. The budget for the video was much lower than Yankovic's "White & Nerdy" and was shot in Lynch's garage. Yankovic stated that the low budget video "dovetails well" with the concept of the song. The video incorporates similar imagery seen in the Doors' videos, including stock footage and art house effects. Yankovic dressed as Morrison, having to lose some weight to look like the singer at age 24, and performed in front of a green screen to allow effects to be added afterward.

== See also ==
- List of songs by "Weird Al" Yankovic
