= Whatever You Like ("Weird Al" Yankovic song) =

Song by 'Weird Al' Yankovic from Alpocalypse

Single by "Weird Al" Yankovic

from the EP Internet Leaks and the album Alpocalypse
- Released: October 8, 2008
- Recorded: September 29, 2008
- Genre: Comedy hip hop
- Length: 3:41 (album version); 3:43 (single version)
- Label: Volcano
- Songwriters: Clifford Harris, James Scheffer, David Siegel, "Weird Al" Yankovic
- Producer: "Weird Al" Yankovic

"Weird Al" Yankovic singles chronology
"Canadian Idiot" (2006)	"Whatever You Like" (2008)	"Craigslist" (2009)

Music video
- ”Whatever You Like” on YouTube

"Whatever You Like" is a song and single by "Weird Al" Yankovic, the first song from the digital EP Internet Leaks and was later released on his thirteenth studio album Alpocalypse. It is a direct parody of the song of the same name by T.I. As with T.I.'s song, Yankovic's lyrics describe a man wooing a girlfriend with gifts that she may want; however, in light of economic problems in the United States at the time, these are inexpensive or economical options, such as clipping coupons or going out to dinner at Burger King or McDonald's.

"Whatever You Like" is the only Yankovic parody to have exactly the same title as the original it parodies. Yankovic commented that thanks to a rapid approval from T.I. he was able to write, record and upload the song to iTunes within two weeks and while the original song was still at No. 1 (it was there for 5 weeks).

== Release ==
In late 2008 Yankovic started to explore the digital distribution of his songs. On October 7, 2008, Yankovic planned to release a parody of "Whatever You Like" from artist T.I., which Yankovic said he had come up with two weeks before. Yankovic said that the benefit of digital distribution is that "I do not have to wait around while my songs get old and dated—I can get them out on the Internet almost immediately." On October 7, 2008, the planned release date, an unexpected error left "Whatever You Like" out of the iTunes new release list. Jon "Bermuda" Schwartz, Yankovic's drummer and webmaster, posted this message: "Apparently there was a glitch at iTunes last night and Al's new single—'Whatever You Like'—did not debut with the rest of the new releases. We're being told that they're working on the problem and (hopefully!!) it will be up later today." The song then became available.

In May 2009, "Whatever You Like" was retroactively dubbed the first track of Internet Leaks, an EP consisting of a series of digitally distributed songs by Yankovic.

== Music video ==
A music video was created by animator Cris Shapan. The video was featured on the deluxe edition of Alpocalypse.

== Chart positions ==
During its first week of release, "Whatever You Like" reached #4 on the Billboard Bubbling Under Chart. The song has also garnered over 13 million listens on YouTube as of April 2012, and over 2.6 million listens on MySpace.

Chart (2008–10)	Peak position
US Bubbling Under Hot 100 Singles (Billboard)	4
US Comedy Digital Tracks (Billboard)	11

== See also ==
- List of songs by "Weird Al" Yankovic
- Thrift Shop (song)
