= Ready for Whatever (T.I. song) =

Single by T.I.

from the album Paper Trail
- Released: September 23, 2008
- Genre: Hip hop
- Length: 5:14
- Label: Grand Hustle; Atlantic Records
- Songwriters: Clifford Harris; Christopher Gholson; Rodney Hill; Monica Arnold
- Producers: Drumma Boy; J. "808" Frazier Jr.

T.I. singles chronology
"Swagga Like Us" (2008)	"Ready for Whatever" (2008)	"Just Like Me" (2008)

"Ready for Whatever" is a song by American rapper T.I., released on September 23, 2008, as the sixth single from his sixth studio album, Paper Trail (2008). The song was produced by Southern hip hop record producer Drumma Boy, and co-written by fellow Southern rapper Rocko as well as the latter's then-girlfriend, Monica.

In a 2014 interview for HipHopDX, Drumma Boy revealed that "Ready for Whatever" had to be edited at least 25 different times, at the request of T.I.'s lawyers, because of the song's detailing of his 2007 arrest for gun possession.

== Release ==
The song was released on September 23, 2008, during the Countdown to Paper Trail on iTunes.

== Track listing ==
Digital download

1. "Ready for Whatever" [Explicit] – 5:14

== Chart performance ==
Chart (2008)	Peak position
Canada Hot 100 (Billboard)	62
US Billboard Hot 100	57

== Release history ==
Country	Date	Format	Label
United States	September 23, 2008	Digital download	Grand Hustle Records, Atlantic Records
