= Whatever You Like =

2008 single by T.I.

Single by T.I.

from the album Paper Trail
- Released: July 29, 2008
- Recorded: 2008
- Genre: Pop rap; Southern hip hop
- Length: 4:09 (album version); 3:40 (radio edit)
- Label: Grand Hustle; Atlantic
- Songwriters: Clifford Harris; James Scheffer; David Siegel
- Producer: Jim Jonsin

T.I. singles chronology
"I'll Be Lovin' U Long Time" (remix) (2008)	"Whatever You Like" (2008)	"Swing Ya Rag" (2008)

"Whatever You Like" is a song by American rapper T.I., released by Grand Hustle and Atlantic Records on July 29, 2008 as the lead single (second overall) from his sixth studio album, Paper Trail (2008). It was written by T.I. and David Siegel, alongside the song's producer Jim Jonsin. In the United Kingdom, it was released on June 1, 2009 and served as the third single from the album.

The song peaked atop the US Billboard Hot 100, becoming T.I.'s first to do so as a lead artist, and his second to do so overall after his guest appearance on Justin Timberlake's 2006 single "My Love". It topped the chart for seven non-consecutive weeks, and remained in the top 3 of the charts for over 12 non-consecutive weeks. It also peaked atop the Recorded Music NZ chart in New Zealand, and has since received octuple platinum certification by the Recording Industry Association of America (RIAA). It was named the 16th most successful song from 2000 to 2009, on the Billboard Hot 100 Songs of the Decade.

== Composition ==
"Whatever You Like"
The chorus of the song contains repeated words with an echo-like digital effect.

"Whatever You Like" was written by T.I., James Scheffer and David Siegel. The song was produced by Jim Jonsin, who produced Lil Wayne's single "Lollipop". The production team worked on the track when T.I. was in the studio recording his album. The instrumentals for "Whatever You Like" are based on a beat of lead synthesizers and drum pattern. The song runs for 4:09 and speaks about a man who can buy a woman whatever she asks for, as well encouraging the woman to ask for anything she wants. A pop-rap song, it contains a sample from "Redemption", the opening and closing theme song from the film Rocky II. "Whatever You Like" is set in common time with a moderately slow tempo of 80 beats per minute, and is written in the key of D minor with a chord progression sequence of Dm-Bb-F-C.

A second version of "Whatever You Like" was released in order to be suitable for radio stations. The original version of the track features T.I. saying "Late night sex so wet, it's so tight", while the radio version replaces these lyrics with the line "Baby I can treat you so special, so nice" in the hook and replacing the line "Thing gets so wet/it hits so right" with "Girl, you smell so fresh, and look so nice" in the breakdown. The line "Tell 'em other broke niggas be quiet" with "Tell 'em other broke jokers be quiet" in the pre-hook, and the second verse also censors the word "brain" in the line "Brain so good/could've sworn you went to college" due to being a slang term for oral sex. The music video uses the edited lyrics.

== Critical reception ==
"Whatever You Like" received generally favorable reviews. Jared W. Dillon of Sputnikmusic called the song a "more sophisticated take" on Lil Wayne's "Lollipop". Ian Cohen of Pitchfork Media noted that the song contained virtually no rapping while praising the synth-driven beat. Blender magazine ranked the song number 14 their Top 144 Songs of 2008 and number 18 on MTV's Commercially Released Hip-Hop Singles.

== Chart performance ==
"Whatever You Like" debuted at number 99 on the Billboard Hot 100. In its third week, it achieved the biggest leap to number one in Billboard Hot 100 chart history when it jumped 70 positions, from number 71 to the top of the chart, breaking the record previously held by Maroon 5's "Makes Me Wonder", which jumped 64 to number one. It became T.I.'s first solo Hot 100 number one of his career and his second overall following the Justin Timberlake song "My Love" where T.I. was a featured artist. The song's jump can be largely attributed to huge first week digital sales of 205,000, debuting at number one on Billboard's Hot Digital Songs chart. The song held the number one position on the Hot 100 for three consecutive weeks, before being replaced by Pink's "So What." The following week the song knocked off "So What" to return to number one on the Hot 100, marking its fourth week overall at the top of the chart. It remained there for another week, marking its fifth week overall. The next week T.I. replaced himself at number one with the follow-up single "Live Your Life" which hadn't been done since Usher in 2004 with the first and second singles off his album ("Yeah!" and "Burn"). After spending two weeks at number two on the Hot 100, "Whatever You Like" again topped the chart by knocking off "Womanizer" by Britney Spears, marking its sixth non-consecutive week at number one on the Hot 100. This was the first time a song returned to number one on the chart after the artist's follow up single had already spent time at number one ("Live Your Life" having already spent a week at number one). It is also only the third song to ever have three separate runs at number one on the Hot 100, following Chic's "Le Freak" in 1979 and Leona Lewis' "Bleeding Love" earlier in 2008. The song retained the number one position the following week, bringing its total to seven non-consecutive weeks at number one. As of August 2013 it had sold 4,347,000 digital copies in the United States.

On the Hot R&B/Hip-Hop Songs chart, "Whatever You Like" peaked at number one, giving T.I. his thirteenth top ten on the chart, and second number one song. It also reached number three on the Pop 100, giving T.I. his biggest solo pop hit. The song became T.I.'s biggest radio hit to date as well, reaching number one on the Hot 100 Airplay chart, and number four so far on Mainstream Top 40. Overall it has topped over nine different Billboard charts.

Internationally, "Whatever You Like" debuted at number twenty-two on the Canadian Hot 100 and has thus far risen to number twelve. It made a strong debut on the Irish Singles Chart at number nineteen. In Australia, on the ARIA Singles Chart, it has so far peaked at number 15 and on the digital track chart at number 15. In New Zealand, the song made a massive jump from number 32 to number eight on the official RIANZ Chart. The following week it became his first number one in New Zealand and are certified by Platinum in that country. It also debuted at number sixty on the UK Singles Chart and peaked at number forty-seven due to strong download sales. It will be re-released as a full CD single release on 1 June 2009 and has been added to the B-list at BBC Radio 1.

== Music video ==
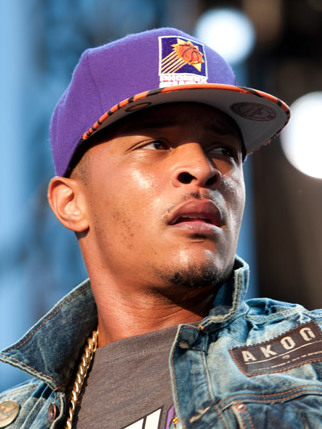
T.I. in 2012

The music video was filmed in Malibu, Los Angeles, California, and was directed by Dave Meyers. Reagan Gomez-Preston plays T.I.'s love interest. Cameos include Jackie Long, Lil Duval, Jim Jonsin, DJ Toomp and T.I.'s wife Tameka Cottle. The video starts with a girl working at a fast food restaurant. When T.I. comes into the restaurant, after ordering hot wings, he hands the girl a folded up paper with his number on it. She then calls him and T.I. invites her to his house. The video then shows her living the high life, with T.I. treating her to private jet rides, fancy dinners, and buying her many expensive gifts, such as a new car. The video also show clips of her living her normal life with her boyfriend. Right before the end of the video, it shows the release date of T.I.'s new album Paper Trail while T.I. is on the red carpet with his girl. At the end it is revealed it is all merely a fantasy sequence the girl was having, and T.I. had only handed the girl a hundred dollar bill, not his number. The concept of the video is similar to the one for Jay-Z's single "Excuse Me Miss".

== Other versions ==
- A parody, also called "Whatever You Like", was recorded by "Weird Al" Yankovic and released on October 8, 2008.
- Students from Ron Clark Academy performed a remake of the song about the 2008 U.S. presidential election called "Vote However You Like". Their performance on CNN was posted on YouTube, drawing national attention with over 2 million views. After learning of the students' remake of his song, T.I. paid a surprise visit to the Academy to watch their performance in person.
- In 2020, US president Donald Trump repurposed the song in a campaign against Joe Biden, altering the lyrics on his Snapchat from "I want yo' body, need yo' body/Long as you got me you won't need nobody," to "I don't want Joe Biden, need Joe Biden/As long as you got me you won't need Joe Biden." A representative for T.I. responded by criticizing Trump for "unauthorized use" of the song and stated that it falsely suggested endorsement of the president or an attack towards Biden from T.I.

== Track listing ==
Digital single

No.	Title	Writer(s)	Sample(s)	Length
1.	"Whatever You Like"	Clifford Harris, James Scheffer, David Siegel	* Contains a sample from "Redemption" performed by Bill Conti	4:11

== Charts ==
=== Weekly charts ===
Chart (2008–2009)	Peak position
Australia (ARIA)	13
Austria (Ö3 Austria Top 40)	70
Bulgaria (BAMP)	8
Canada Hot 100 (Billboard)	12
Europe (European Hot 100)	79
Germany (GfK)	57
Hungary (Rádiós Top 40)	24
Ireland (IRMA)	19
Netherlands (Dutch Top 40)	25
Netherlands (Single Top 100)	45
New Zealand (Recorded Music NZ)	1
Norway (VG-lista)	19
Scottish Singles Sales (Official Charts)	17
Sweden (Sverigetopplistan)	51
UK Singles (Official Charts)	47
US Billboard Hot 100	1
US Hot R&B/Hip-Hop Songs (Billboard)	1
US Hot Rap Songs (Billboard)	1
US Pop Airplay (Billboard)	3
US Rhythmic Airplay (Billboard)	1

=== Year-end charts ===
Chart (2008)	Peak position
Australia Top 100 Singles	63
Canadian Hot 100	79
Hungarian Singles Chart	82
Ireland Singles Chart	81
US Billboard Hot 100	15
US Billboard Hot R&B/Hip-Hop Songs	17
US Billboard Hot Rap Tracks	4
US Billboard Pop 100	29
US Rhythmic (Billboard)	15

Chart (2009)	Position
US Billboard Hot 100	40
US Hot R&B/Hip-Hop Songs (Billboard)	53
US Rhythmic (Billboard)	26

=== Decade-end charts ===
Chart (2000–2009)	Rank
US Billboard Hot 100	16

=== All-time charts ===
Chart (1958–2018)	Position
US Billboard Hot 100	127

== Certifications ==
Region	Certification	Certified units/sales
New Zealand (RMNZ)	Platinum	15,000^{*}
United Kingdom (BPI)	Platinum	600,000^{‡}
United States (RIAA)	8× Platinum	8,000,000^{‡}
United States (RIAA) Mastertone	2× Platinum	2,000,000^{^}
^{*} Sales figures based on certification alone.^{^} Shipments figures based on certification alone.^{‡} Sales+streaming figures based on certification alone.

== See also ==
- List of number-one singles from the 2000s (New Zealand)
- List of Billboard Hot 100 number-one singles of 2008
- List of R&B number-one singles of 2008 (U.S.)
