= Plies discography =

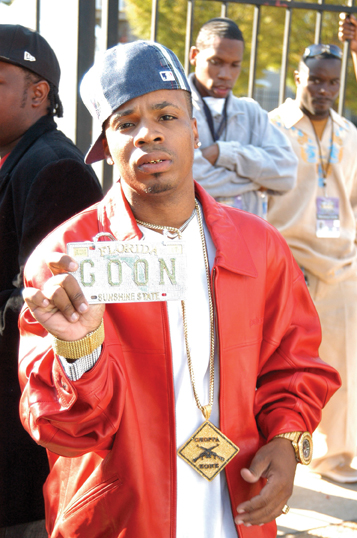
- Plies c. 2008
- Studio albums: 4
- Extended plays: 1
- Singles: 25
- Music videos: 25
- Featured singles: 22
- Mixtapes: 18

This is the discography of American rapper Plies. It consists of 4 studio albums, one EP, 18 mixtapes, 25 singles (including 22 as featured artist) and 25 music videos.

== Albums ==
=== Studio albums ===
List of albums, with selected chart positions and certifications
Title	Album details	Peak chart positions			Certifications
Title	Album details	US	US R&B	US Rap	Certifications
The Real Testament	Released: August 7, 2007; Label: Big Gates, Slip-n-Slide, Atlantic; Format: CD, digital download	2	2	2	RIAA: Platinum
Definition of Real	Released: June 10, 2008; Label: Big Gates, Slip-n-Slide, Atlantic; Format: CD, digital download	2	2	2	RIAA: Gold
Da REAList	Released: December 16, 2008; Label: Big Gates, Slip-n-Slide, Atlantic; Format: CD, digital download	14	4	1	RIAA: Gold
Goon Affiliated	Released: June 8, 2010; Label: Big Gates, Slip-n-Slide, Atlantic; Format: CD, digital download	5	1	1	

=== Compilation albums ===
Title	Album details
The Lost Sessions	Released: December 15, 2009; Label: U Digg; Format: Digital download

== Extended plays ==
Title	EP details
3 Headed Monster	Released: January 19, 2010; Label: Big Gates, Slip-n-Slide, Atlantic; Format: Digital download

== Mixtapes ==
Title	Mixtape details
36 Ounces (A Whole Brick)	Released: 2004; Label: Big Gates, Slip-n-Slide
100% Real Nigga	Released: March 1, 2005; Label: Big Gates, Slip-n-Slide
Bottom to the Top	Released: August 21, 2006; Hosted by DJ Drama
The Truth Hurts	Released: January 18, 2007; Hosted by DJ Scream
You Need People Like Me	Released: September 3, 2010; Hosted by DJ Scream
You Need People Like Me 2	Released: November 18, 2010; Hosted by DJ Scream
No Chaser	Released: December 23, 2010; Hosted by DJ Scream
I Fuck with the DJ	Released: March 15, 2011; Label: Big Gates
Aristotle	Released: September 1, 2011; Hosted by DJ Bigga Rankin
On Trial	Released: February 24, 2012; Label: Big Gates
On Trial 2	Released: November 8, 2012; Label: Big Gates
Da Last Real Nigga Left	Released: January 17, 2014; Label: Big Gates; Retail Mixtape
Da Last Real Nigga Left 2	Released: November 13, 2014; Label: Big Gates; Retail Mixtape
Ain't No Mixtape Bih	Released: August 8, 2015; Label: Big Gates; Retail Mixtape
Ain't No Mixtape BIH 2	Released: November 19, 2015; Label: Big Gates; Retail Mixtape
F.E.M.A. (with Kodak Black)	Released: October 31, 2017; Labels: Dollaz N Dealz, Atlantic; Format: Digital download, streaming
Ain't No Mixtape BIH 3	Released: December 15, 2017; Label: Big Gates; Retail Mixtape
The GOAT	Released: May 10, 2019; Label: Big Gates, Slip-n-Slide; Retail Mixtape
The Real Testament II	Released: March 27, 2020; Label: Big Gates, Slip-n-Slide, Atlantic; Format: CD, digital download, LP

== Singles ==
=== As lead artist ===
List of singles as lead artist, with selected chart positions and certifications, showing year released and album name
Title	Year	Peak chart positions						Certifications	Album	
Title	Year	US	US R&B/HH	US Rap	CAN	NZ	UK	Certifications	Album	
"Shawty" (featuring T-Pain)	2007	9	2	1	—	10	—	RIAA: Platinum; RMNZ: Gold	The Real Testament	
"Hypnotized" (featuring Akon)	2007	14	22	3	77	4	66	RIAA: Platinum; RMNZ: 2× Platinum	The Real Testament	
"Bust It Baby (Part 2)" (featuring Ne-Yo)	2008	7	2	2	—	9	81	RIAA: Platinum; RMNZ: Platinum	Definition of Real	
"Please Excuse My Hands" (featuring Jamie Foxx and The-Dream)	2008	66	8	9	—	—	—		Definition of Real	
"Put It on Ya" (featuring Chris J)	2008	31	8	6	—	—	—		Da REAList	
"Want It, Need It" (featuring Ashanti)	2009	96	21	13	—	—	—		Da REAList	
"Plenty Money"	2009	107	20	12	—	—	—		Da REAList	
"Becky"	2009	101	32	—	—	—	—	RIAA: Gold	Goon Affiliated	
"Medicine" (featuring Keri Hilson)	2009	108	47	21	—	—	—		Goon Affiliated	
"She Got It Made" (featuring Bei Maejor)	2010	103	30	17	—	—	—		Goon Affiliated	
"Fuckin' Or What"	2013	—	—	—	—	—	—		Non-album singles	
"Faithful" (featuring Rico Love)	2013	—	—	—	—	—	—		Non-album singles	
"THICK" (featuring Luke)	2014	—	—	—	—	—	—		Non-album singles	
"Find You" (featuring Lil Wayne and K Camp)	2015	—	—	—	—	—	—		Non-album singles	
"Dayum!"	2015	—	—	—	—	—	—		Ain't No Mixtape Bih	
"I Just Want the Paper"	2015	—	—	—	—	—	—		Non-album singles	
"Fuck Me" (featuring Pleasure P)	2015	—	—	—	—	—	—		Non-album singles	
"Ran Off on da Plug Twice"	2016	— (Note: "Ran Off on da Plug Twice" did not chart on the Billboard Hot 100, but peaked at number 17 on the Bubbling Under Hot 100 Singles chart.)	—	42	—	—	—	—		Ain't No Mixtape Bih 2 & Purple Heart
"Rich N*gga Shit"	2016	—	—	—	—	—	—		Purple Heart	
"Racks Up to My Ear" (featuring Young Dolph)	2016	—	—	—	—	—	—		Purple Heart	
"Real Hitta" (featuring Kodak Black)	2017	100	42	—	—	—	—		F.E.M.A.	
"All Thee Above" (featuring Kevin Gates)	2018	—	—	—	—	—	—		Non-album single	
"Drip 4 Sale"	2019	—	—	—	—	—	—		The GOAT	
"Boss Friends" (featuring DaBaby)	2019	—	—	—	—	—	—		Non-album singles	
"Nasty Nasty" (featuring Yung Bleu)	2021	—	—	—	—	—	—		Non-album singles	
"—" denotes a recording that did not chart or was not released in that territory.

=== As featured artist ===
List of singles as featured artist, with selected chart positions and certifications, showing year released and album name
Title	Year	Peak chart positions			Certifications	Album
Title	Year	US	US R&B	US Rap	Certifications	Album
"I'm So Hood" (DJ Khaled featuring T-Pain, Trick Daddy, Rick Ross and Plies)	2007	19	9	5	RIAA: Gold	We the Best
"Ain't Sayin' Nothin'" (Fat Joe featuring Plies and Dre)	2008	—	93	—		The Elephant in the Room
"Out Here Grindin" (DJ Khaled featuring Akon, Rick Ross, Young Jeezy, Lil Boosie, Trick Daddy, Ace Hood and Plies)	2008	38	32	17	RIAA: Gold	We Global
"Come On In" (Sean Garrett featuring Akon and Plies)	2008	—	—	—		Non-album single
"Year of the Lover" (Lloyd featuring Plies)	2008	—	101	—		Lessons in Love
"Nasty Girl" (Ludacris featuring Plies)	2009	—	54	23		Theater of the Mind
"Wasted" (Gucci Mane featuring Plies)	2009	36	3	3		The State vs. Radric Davis
"Headboard" (Hurricane Chris featuring Mario and Plies)	2009	—	63	—		Unleashed
"Hey Daddy (Daddy's Home)" (Usher featuring Plies)	2009	24	2	—	RIAA: 2× Platinum; RMNZ: Platinum	Raymond v. Raymond
"Put Your Hands Up" (DJ Khaled featuring Young Jeezy, Plies, Rick Ross and Schife)	2010	—	—	—		Victory
"Something Real" (Trae tha Truth featuring Plies, Slim Thug, Brian Angel & Jodeci)	2010	—	—	—		Non-album single
"Lose My Mind" (Young Jeezy featuring Plies)	2010	35	5	3		Thug Motivation 103: Hustlerz Ambition
"Phone #" (Bobby V featuring Plies)	2010	—	55	—		Fly on the Wall
"Welcome to My Hood" (DJ Khaled featuring Rick Ross, Plies, Lil Wayne and T-Pain)	2011	79	30	14		We the Best Forever
"I'm on It" (Lady featuring Plies and Jeremih)	2011	—	—	—		Non-album singles
"Bang" (PBG featuring Plies)	2011	—	—	—		Non-album singles
"Sweet Pwussy Satday" (C-Class featuring Plies)	2015	—	—	—		Non-album singles
"Rock with You" (Pleasure P featuring Plies)	2015	—	—	—		Non-album singles
"Dumb Love" (Akevius featuring Plies)	2016	—	—	—		Non-album singles
"Juvy" Remix (Mook Boy featuring Plies and Maino)	2016	—	—	—		Non-album singles
"No Clutchin" Remix (KT featuring Plies and Boosie Badazz)	2016	—	—	—		Non-album singles
"Fuck A Real Nigga" (DJ Clue featuring Plies, Lil Wayne, Chris Echols and Chinx)	2018	—	—	—		TBA
"—" denotes a recording that did not chart or was not released in that territory.

=== Promotional singles ===
List of promotional singles, with selected chart positions, showing year released and album name
Title	Year	Peak chart positions		Album
Title	Year	US	US R&B	Album
"Long Gone" (Nelly featuring Plies and Chris Brown)	2010	121	102	5.0
"Rock"	2017	95	40	Ain't No Mixtape Bih 3
"—" denotes a recording that did not chart or was not released in that territory.

== Other certified songs ==
List of other certified song, showing year released and album name
Title	Year	Certifications	Album
"Heart Mind" (with Kodak Black)	2017	RMNZ: Gold	F.E.M.A.

== Guest appearances ==
List of non-single guest appearances, with other performing artists, showing year released and album name
Title	Year	Other artist(s)	Album
"Speedin'" (We the Best Remix)	2007	Rick Ross, R. Kelly, DJ Khaled, Birdman, Busta Rhymes, Webbie, Gorilla Zoe, Fat Joe, Torch, Gunplay, Flo Rida, Brisco, Lil Wayne	The Flo Rida Cash Cartel
"Stressin"	2008	Ace Hood	Gutta
"What I Do"	2009	Chris Brown	Graffiti
"Lurkin"	2012	Waka Flocka Flame	Triple F Life: Friends, Fans & Family
"Shout Out to the Real"	2012	DJ Khaled, Meek Mill, Ace Hood	Kiss the Ring
"Got Damn"	2013	Ace Hood	Starvation 2
"Cutters"	2013	Gucci Mane	Diary of a Trap God
"Blackball"	2013	DJ Khaled, Future, Ace Hood	Suffering from Success
"Sleep"	2014	E-40, Ludacris	Sharp On All 4 Corners: Corner 2
"Sexé"	2016	Jeezy	Trap or Die 3
"Cross Me"	2018	YoungBoy Never Broke Again, Lil Baby	Realer
"200 Bands"	2025	Bryson Tiller, T-Pain	Solace & The Vices
