= 2008 in hip-hop =

This article summarizes the events, album releases, and album release dates in hip-hop for the year 2008.

== Events ==
=== January ===
- The Game states that after his third album, L.A.X., he will retire.
- Freekey Zeekey states that all is well with Dipset, and they are working on new projects.
- Rick Ross says that Trilla will be one of the best albums of 2008, and that he and Birdman are recording an album together, as well as making a movie together.
- 50 Cent, Timbaland, Mary J. Blige, and Wyclef Jean are listed in the Albany, New York Times Union list of steroid trafficking.
- Eminem was rushed to the hospital due to complications of pneumonia, and reports said his weight had exceeded 200 pounds.
- Twista launches a new label called the Get Money Gang.
- Flo Rida breaks a digital sales record, by selling over 470,000 digital units in one week.
- Nate Dogg suffers a stroke.
- L.A. Reid is named Def Jam President, after Jay-Z stepped down to pursue other options.
- Joell Ortiz leaves Aftermath Entertainment after not being able to produce music at the rate he wanted to.

=== February ===
- Devin the Dude leaves Rap-a-Lot Records.
- A tabloid is circulated, that says Benzino was with Fat Joe's wife in the past, but the magazine was later found out to be fake.
- MTV president Christina Norman leaves her position.
- The Game was given 2 months in jail because of his several incidents of violence.
- DJ Khaled initializes a label under Def Jam, called We The Best Music. He signs his first artist, Ace Hood.
- Ruthless Records returns, with help from Sony. Eazy-E's wife Tomica Woods-Wright is the CEO of the re-formed company.
- Nas says his album, Nigger, will be released in April.
- TVT Records (home of Lil Jon, Ying Yang Twins, and Pitbull) closes down after 22 years in the business.
- Lil Wayne says his album, Tha Carter III, will be released in April.
- Producer and songwriter Static Major dies.
- KRS-One and DJ Revolution sign to Duck Down Records.
- Fat Joe and 50 Cent's feud continues, with Fat Joe saying that in a fair fight, 50 would probably beat him, but he would love to send him to the dentist.

=== March ===
- Disturbing tha Peace signs with Def Jam.
- Fat Joe and 50 Cent continue to beef, especially through the internet and through videos. G-Unit releases a mixtape called "The Elephant In The Sand".
- G Unit's DJ, Whoo Kid, says he is going to retire.
- Eminem and Royce Da 5'9" cease the beef.
- Chuck Philips of the Los Angeles Times says that Diddy and Jimmy Rosemond were in on the assault of Tupac Shakur, but Diddy denies the rumor.
- Jadakiss speaks on his highly anticipated debut album with Def Jam.
- Tha Carter III is set to be released on May 13, while L.A.X. is set to be released on June 24.
- Los Angeles Times reports that said Diddy knew about the Tupac Shakur shooting before it happened were based on fraudulent documents, but the Los Angeles Times later apologized for the rumors.
- T.I. is found guilty for gun charges.
- Nate Dogg pleads guilty on a domestic violence charge.
- Remy Ma was found guilty of charges that were put against her last year, and could face up to 25 years in prison.
- Former Dipset member Max B is shot, and is said to be in critical condition.
- Nelly says that his first album in four years, Brass Knuckles, is set to be released later in 2008.
- 50 Cent talks about the fake Benzino/Fat Joe Hip Hop Weekly album cover(he says he did not create it), and fires "warning shots" at Rick Ross.

=== April ===
- KL of Screwball dies of a heart attack.
- Jay-Z signs a $150,000,000 deal with Live Nation.
- Despite the big signs Diddy made to get Notorious B.I.G., Mase, and Mary J. Blige, Diddy says that his biggest sign is Janelle Monáe.
- Trina's album, Still da Baddest, is the number 1 on the Rap albums on Billboard.
- New Orleans rapper VL Mike is murdered on April 20 at age 32.
- Tha Carter III is pushed back again, to June.
- Jermaine Dupri and TAG Body Spray launch a hip hop record label.
- DJ Whoo Kid says he doesn't want to retire, but he's not going to stick around until he's 40.
- The Trackmasters return.
- Ja Rule says that soon he will release his new album, The Mirror.
- Bobby Valentino leaves Disturbing Tha Peace.
- The UK ban of Snoop Dogg is lifted.
- The Game moves the release date on L.A.X. from June 24 to July 8.

=== May ===
- DMX is arrested in Arizona because of drug and animal cruelty charges.
- MTV gets hip-hop hate because of the mediocre rappers that were on the list of the best.
- Suge Knight is assaulted and hospitalized.
- Remy Ma's case gets re-evaluated, and only has to serve 8 years in prison.
- Mass Appeal Magazine calls it quits after 12 years running.
- Rick Ross's Trilla becomes the first hip hop album to be certified gold in 2008, due to the heavy airplay of his second single, "The Boss".
- Dunk Ryders sign to Cash Money Records.
- A G-Unit representative denies the reports of the $300,000,000 deal.
- Nas co-signs Jay Electronica.
- Nas changes the name of his formerly titled Nigger album to Nas.
- Polow da Don is named the Songwriter of the Year by BMI.
- Saigon is released from Atlantic Records.
- New York governor David Paterson pardons Slick Rick, ending his immigration woes.
- A judge orders Suge Knight to sell Death Row Records.
- Yung Joc starts his own label under Jive Records called Swagg Team Entertainment, signing Chicago rap trio Hotstylz as its first act.

=== June ===
- Trick Daddy leaves Slip-N-Slide Records, and has talks with Def Jam.
- Shakir Stewart gets promoted to Executive VP of Def Jam.
- Charli Baltimore re-signs with Murder Inc Records
- Nas's album name changes again, to Untitled.
- The Game changes his release date of the album L.A.X. again, to July 22, and also says that he has made the decision to not make LAX his last album.
- Lil Wayne's album, Tha Carter III, sells over a million copies for its first week. This feat was last done by 50 Cent's The Massacre. His debut single from the album, "Lollipop" was #1 on Billboard 100 for 5 non-consecutive weeks.
- T.I. signs 8Ball & MJG, while he continues to have beef with Shawty Lo and 50 Cent.
- The Orchard wins the bid for TVT Records to buy out the bankrupt label.
- Nate Dogg is arrested for terrorist threats to his girlfriend.
- DMX is arrested for not having a valid driver's license.
- The Game's album, L.A.X., is once again pushed back, this time to August 26.
- 2 Pistols falls after one punch at a BET Awards pre-party from Dolla after back-and-forth disses.
- D-Block is set to release a new album; their first group album since 2000.
- Death Row is sold in an auction after Suge Knight was ordered to sell the label; it was sold for 24 million dollars to Susan Berg.
- DJ Khaled is set to release the album, We Global, later in 2008.
- BET loses the sponsorship over violence, profanity, and obscenity in hip-hop videos. (Industry Ears and CNN, Procter & Gamble, Pepsi and General Motors pulled their ads from Rap City and 106 & Park.)
- The Clipse will release their album, Clipse Presents: Re-Up Gang, later in 2008 on Koch Records.
- Snoop Dogg states that he is impressed by Detox, Dr. Dre's new album. He also says that Dre will produce his new album.
- Kanye West was reportedly booed at 2008's Bonnaroo festival. A couple of days later, he responded with an all-caps rant post on his blog, KanyeUniverseCity.

=== July ===
- 50 Cent sues Taco Bell for $4 million because the food chain had used his name without permission.
- Gucci Mane is arrested on gun and drug charges.
- Nas teams up with MoveOn.org and Color of Change to obtain signatures to end the accusations of Barack Obama.
- Lil Wayne's album, Tha Carter III, is certified double platinum.
- Bone Thugs-n-Harmony reunite after many years with the release of Flesh-n-Bone from jail and the return of turmoiled group member Bizzy Bone. They are recording a reunion album.
- LL Cool J denies signing with G-Unit Records.
- It has been found out that popular Miami rapper Rick Ross used to be a correctional officer before becoming a rapper.
- Veteran New Orleans rapper, Sporty T murdered inside of a trailer.
- Baltimore DJ, K-Swift, dies in a swimming pool.
- The mayor of Houston proclaimed July 22, "Trae Day", for Trae's help in the community and city.
- Upcoming Rapper Kid Cudi Drops Mixtape A Kid Named Cudi Spawning Two Singles Day 'n' Nite And T.G.I.F..

=== August ===
- Master P gets the key to the city of Memphis for the "Let The Kids Grow Day" project he organized.
- Dr. Dre's daughter releases a controversial documentary called Daddy's Shadow talking about her dad not supporting her dreams of rapping.
- Big Boi and Killer Mike end their 3-year feud.
- Yung Berg is arrested for possession of a pistol and marijuana.
- Trae and Mike Jones get into an altercation at the 2008 Ozone Awards.
- Ice Cube's new album, Raw Footage, is leaked onto the internet.
- Cam'ron sold Juelz Santana's contract to Def Jam for $2 million, hence removing Santana from the Diplomats roster.
- DJ Vlad sues Rick Ross for assaulting him.
- 50 Cent is #1 on Forbes' 2008 Hip-Hop Cash Kings, making $150 million last year for his Vitamin Water deal, his sales of Curtis, and his G-Unit clothing, and his record label. Following behind is Jay-Z at #2, Diddy at #3, and Kanye West at #4. Common, Akon, & Lil Wayne made first time showings on the list.
- Da Brat is sentenced to three years in prison for striking a woman with a rum bottle at an Atlanta nightclub in 2007.
- The Game's new album, L.A.X., is leaked onto the Internet earlier than expected.
- Dr. Dre's son, Andre Young, Jr., aged 20, was found dead on August 23, 2008.
- Young Jeezy's new album, The Recession, is leaked onto the Internet.
- LL Cool J's new album, Exit 13, is leaked onto the Internet a day before its release.

=== September ===
- Yung Berg was hospitalized after being beaten up and robbed for his Transformers necklace in Detroit at Trick Trick's club, Plan B.
- Kanye West was arrested for damaging two of the paparazzi's cameras. He posted bail for $20,000.
- Nelly's new album, Brass Knuckles, is leaked onto the Internet four days before its release.
- 50 Cent stated that his album Before I Self Destruct will be released on December 9, 2008, a week before Kanye's album will be released.
- Nate Dogg suffers his second stroke in less than a year. He is reported in critical condition.
- T.I.'s new album, Paper Trail, is released on September 30, 2008. It achieved gold status in its first week and debuted at number one on the Billboard 200. The album sold 568,000 copies and became T.I.'s biggest debut to date. His album yielded two #1 hit singles ("Whatever You Like" & "Live Your Life").
- Ludacris's pool house gets set on fire.
- Kanye West has pushed his album 808s and Heartbreak to November.

=== October ===
- Maino allegedly smacked Yung Berg in the face.
- C-Murder supposed to appear in court on October 14, for his murder trial.
- Johnny J, a Hip-Hop producer known for producing many of Tupac Shakur's songs, dies after allegedly committing suicide by jumping of a tier of a county jail.
- 50 Cent releases first single "Get Up" off new album Before I Self Destruct due December 9.
- Eminem tells Shade 45 that his new album will be called Relapse.
- Kanye West new album 808s and Heartbreak to be released November 25.
- Lil Jon signs to Universal Republic Records and plans to release next album sometime in 2009.
- Lil Wayne stated that he will release the reissue of Tha Carter III, naming it Tha Carter III: The Rebirth. He now has another boy named Dwayne Carter III. He also won 9 BET Hip-Hop Awards the same day.
- Lil Boosie has been arrested for marijuana and weapons possession in Baton Rouge, Louisiana.

=== November ===
- Shakir Steward, president of Def Jam Records, died of a self-inflicted gun wound.
- Lupe Fiasco stated that Lupe E.N.D. will be his final album, but it will be a triple CD set.
- Chamillionaire releases his first single from his third studio album, Venom, called Creepin' (Solo) featuring Ludacris.
- MC Breed passes away at the age of 36.
- 8 Mile actor, De'Angelo Wilson dies of suicide by hanging.
- Kanye West releases his fourth studio album, 808s & Heartbreak

=== December ===
- Another arrest warrant is issued to DMX.
- Lil Wayne has the most Grammy nominations for the Grammy Awards 2009 of eight nods. Jay-Z & Kanye West both received 6 nominations each, while T.I. & Lupe Fiasco both received 4 nominations each.
- Chingy has been dropped from DTP/Def Jam Records due to lackluster sales on his fourth album, Hate It Or Love It.
- Plies releases his 3rd studio album in less than 17 months titled, Da Realist.
- Jim Jones was arrested for allegedly beating up a friend of the R&B singer Ne-Yo outside the Louis Vuitton store in New York City in December 2008; he has pleaded not guilty.

== Albums ==
Release Date	Artist	Album	Notes
January 15	Chino XL	Something Sacred	Singles: "Chow Down"
January 22	Big Noyd	Illustrious	Singles: "Things Done Changed"
February 5	Salt-N-Pepa	20th Century Masters – The Millennium Collection: The Best of Salt-N-Pepa	
February 19	Jim Jones	Harlem's American Gangster	Debuts at No. 19 on the Billboard 200; Singles: "Love Me No More"
February 19	Pastor Troy	Attitude Adjuster	
February 26	Webbie	Savage Life 2	Debuts at No. 4 on the Billboard 200; Singles: "Independent", "I Miss You"
February 26	Pete Rock	NY's Finest	Debuts at No. 193 on the Billboard 200; Singles: "Till I Retire"
February 26	Shawty Lo	Units in the City	Debuts at No. 13 on the Billboard 200; Singles: "Dey Know", "Dunn Dunn", "Foolish (Remix)"
March 4	Lil' Flip & Young Noble	All Eyez on Us	Debuts at No. 137 on the Billboard 200
March 4	Rakim	The Archive: Live, Lost & Found	
March 4	Bizzy Bone	Ruthless	
March 4	Layzie Bone	Thugz Nation	
March 10	Braintax	My Last and Best Album	
March 11	Rick Ross	Trilla	Debuts at No. 1 on the Billboard 200; Singles: "Speedin'", "The Boss", "Here I Am"; Certified Gold
March 11	Snoop Dogg	Ego Trippin'	Debuts at No. 3 on the Billboard 200; Singles: "Sensual Seduction", "Life of da Party", "My Medicine", "Those Gurlz"
March 11	Fat Joe	The Elephant in the Room	Debuts at No. 6 on the Billboard 200; Singles: "I Won't Tell", "Ain't Sayin' Nothin'"
March 11	Del the Funky Homosapien	Eleventh Hour	Debuts at #78 on the Billboard 200
March 18	Flo Rida	Mail on Sunday	Debuts at No. 4 on the Billboard 200; Singles: "Low", "Elevator", "In the Ayer"
March 18	Rocko	Self-Made	Debuts at No. 21 on the Billboard 200; Singles: "Umma Do Me", "Tomorrow"
March 18	Sheek Louch	Silverback Gorilla	Debuts at No. 41 on the Billboard 200; Singles: "Good Love"
March 18	Bone Brothers	Still Creepin on Ah Come Up	
March 25	Baracuda	Knucklebone	
March 25	Bourgeois Cyborgs (Noah23 & Baracuda)	Bourgeois Cyborgs	
March 25	CRUNK23 (Noah23 & Crunk Chris)	Dirty Bling	
March 25	Guilty Simpson	Ode to the Ghetto	Singles: "Getting Bitches", "She Won't Stay at Home"
March 25	eMC	The Show	
March 25	The Weird Apples (Noah23, Livestock & Madadam)	The Big Crunch	
April 1	Trina	Still da Baddest	Debuts at No. 6 on the Billboard 200; Singles: "Single Again", "I Got a Thang for You", "Look Back at You"
April 1	AZ	Undeniable	Debuts at No. 141 on the Billboard 200
April 1	8Ball & E.D.I.	Doin' It Big	
April 1	A Tribe Called Quest	The Best of A Tribe Called Quest	
April 15	Dark Lotus	The Opaque Brotherhood	
April 22	Atmosphere	When Life Gives You Lemons, You Paint That Shit Gold	Debuts at No. 4 on the Billboard 200; Singles: "Shoulda Known", "Guarantees", "You"
April 22	Prodigy	H.N.I.C. Pt. 2	Debuts at No. 36 on the Billboard 200; Singles: "The Life", "New Yitty", "ABC's"
April 22	Bizzy Bone	A Song For You	Debuts at No. 12 on the Billboard 200; Singles: "A Song For You"
April 29	The Roots	Rising Down	Debuts at No. 6 on the Billboard 200; Singles: "Get Busy", "Rising Up"
April 29	9th Wonder & Buckshot	The Formula	Singles: "Go All Out", "Hold It Down"
April 29	Lil Mama	VYP (Voice of the Young People)	Debuts at No. 21 on the Billboard 200; Singles: "Lip Gloss", "G-Slide (Tour Bus)", "Shawty Get Loose", "L.I.F.E.", "What It Is (Strike a Pose)"
April 29	Baby D	A-Town Secret Weapon	Singles: "I'm Bout Money"
April 29	MJG	Pimp Tight	
May 6	Krizz Kaliko	Vitiligo	
May 7	Sadistik	The Balancing Act	Singles: "Searching for Some Beautiful"
May 13	Boondox	Krimson Creek	
May 13	Foxy Brown	Brooklyn's Don Diva	
May 18	8Ball & MJG	We Are the South: Greatest Hits	
May 20	Bun B	II Trill	Debuts at No. 2 on the Billboard 200; Singles: "That's Gangsta", "You're Everything"
May 20	Frayser Boy	Da Key	
May 20	Grave Plott	The Plott Thickens	
May 27	Speedknot Mobstaz	Mobstability II: Nation Business	
June 3	Prozak	Tales from the Sick	
June 6	Various Artists	Modal Soul Classics	
June 10	Lil Wayne	Tha Carter III	Debuts at No. 1 on the Billboard 200; Singles: "Lollipop", "Got Money", "A Milli", "Mrs. Officer"; Certified Triple Platinum
June 10	Plies	Definition of Real	Debuts at No. 2 on the Billboard 200; Singles: "Bust It Baby Pt. 2", "Please Excuse My Hands; Certified Gold
June 10	N.E.R.D.	Seeing Sounds	Debuts at No. 7 on the Billboard 200; Single: "Everyone Nose", "Spaz", "Everyone Nose Remix"
June 10	Tyga	No Introduction	Debuts at No. 112 on the Billboard 200; Singles: "Coconut Juice", "Diamond Life", "AIM"
June 17	2 Pistols	Death Before Dishonor	Debuts at #32 on the Billboard 200; Singles: "She Got It", "You Know Me"
June 17	Blood Raw	My Life: The True Testimony	Debuts at #29 on the Billboard 200; Singles: "Louie"
June 17	Craig G and Marley Marl	Operation: Take Back Hip-Hop	
June 17	Geto Boys	Best of the Geto Boys	
June 24	Three 6 Mafia	Last 2 Walk	Debuts at #5 on the Billboard 200; Singles: "Lolli Lolli (Pop That Body)", "I'd Rather", "That's Right"
June 24	Immortal Technique	The 3rd World	Debuts at #99 on the Billboard 200; Singles: "The 3rd World", "Payback", "Reverse Pimpology", "Mistakes", "Golpe De Estado"
June 24	Danny!	And I Love H.E.R.: Original Motion Picture Soundtrack	
June 24	RZA	Digi Snacks	
July 1	G-Unit	T.O.S: Terminate on Sight	Debuts at No. 4 on the Billboard 200; Singles: "Rider Pt. 2", "I Like The Way She Do It", "Close To Me"
July 1	Tech N9ne	Killer	Singles: "Everybody Move", "Like Yeah"
July 1	Byrd Gang	M.O.B.: The Album	Debuts at No. 29 on the Billboard 200; Singles: "Splash", "ByrdGang Money"
July 8	Jean Grae	Jeanius	
July 8	Killer Mike	I Pledge Allegiance to the Grind II	
July 8	T.H.U.G. Angelz	Welcome to Red Hook Houses	
July 15	Nas	Untitled	Debuts at No. 1 on the Billboard 200; Singles: "Hero", "Make the World Go Round"; Certified Gold
July 15	David Banner	The Greatest Story Ever Told	Debuts at No. 8 on the Billboard 200; Singles: "Speaker", "Get Like Me", "Shawty Say"
July 15	MJG	This Might Be the Day	
July 22	Skillz	The Million Dollar Backpack	Singles: "So Far So Good"
July 22	Hell Rell	Black Mask, Black Gloves	Debuts at No. 131 on the Billboard 200
July 22	Khia	Nasti Muzik	Singles: "What They Do", "Be Your Lady"
July 23	Murs & 9th Wonder	Sweet Lord	
August 5	Re-Up Gang	Clipse Presents: Re-Up Gang	Debuts at No. 55 on the Billboard 200; Singles: "Fast Life"
August 5	Nappy Roots	The Humdinger	
August 5	Outlawz	We Want In: The Street LP	
August 12	Daz Dillinger	Only on the Left Side	
August 12	eLZhi	The Preface	
August 12	Skatterman & Snug Brim	Word on tha Streets	
August 12	Yung Berg	Look What You Made Me	Debuts at No. 20 on the Billboard 200; Singles: "Sexy Lady", "Sexy Lady Remix", "Sexy Can I", "Do That There", "The Business"
August 19	Ice Cube	Raw Footage	Debuts at No. 5 on the Billboard 200; Singles: "Gangsta Rap Made Me Do It", "Do Ya Thang", "Why Me"
August 19	GZA	Pro Tools	Debuts at No. 52 on the Billboard 200; Singles: "Paper Plate"
August 26	The Game	LAX	Debuts at No. 2 on the Billboard 200; Singles: "Game's Pain", "Dope Boys", "My Life", "House of Pain"
August 26	V.I.C.	Beast	Debuts at No. 73 on the Billboard 200; Singles: "Get Silly", "Wobble", "Flawless"
August 26	Esham	Sacrificial Lambz	Singles: "World Hustle"
September 2	Jeezy	The Recession	Debuts at No. 1 on the Billboard 200; Singles: "Put On", "Vacation", "Crazy World", "My President"; Certified Gold
September 2	Boss Hogg Outlawz	Back by Blockular Demand: Serve & Collect II	Debuts at No. 48 on the Billboard 200; Singles: "Keep It Playa"
September 9	LL Cool J	Exit 13	Debuts at No. 9 on the Billboard 200; Singles: "Rocking with the G.O.A.T.", Baby", "Feel My Heart Beat", "Mr. President"
September 9	Kardinal Offishall	Not 4 Sale	Debuts at No. 40 on the Billboard 200; Singles: "Dangerous", "Burnt", "Set It Off", "Numba 1 (Tide is High)"
September 16	Axe Murder Boyz	God's Hand	Debuts at No. 11 on the Billboard Top Heatseekers chart & No. 36 on the Top Independent Albums chart
September 16	DJ Khaled	We Global	Debuts at No. 7 on the Billboard 200; Singles: "Out Here Grindin", "Go Hard"
September 16	DJ Muggs and Planet Asia	Pain Language	
September 16	Ice Cube	The Essentials	
September 16	Ill Bill	The Hour of Reprisal	
September 16	Nelly	Brass Knuckles	Debuts at No. 3 on the Billboard 200; Singles: "Party People", "Stepped On My J'z", "Body on Me", "Warrior", "One and Only"
September 23	Gucci Mane	Hood Classics	Debuts at No. 197 on the Billboard 200
September 23	Noah23	Rock Paper Scissors	
September 30	Big Kuntry King	My Turn to Eat	Debuts at No. 95 on the Billboard 200; Singles: "That's Right", "Da Baddest"
September 30	Dem Franchize Boyz	Our World, Our Way	Debuts at No. 115 on the Billboard 200; Singles: "Talkin' Out da Side of Ya Neck!", "Turn Heads"
September 30	Heltah Skeltah	DIRT	
September 30	Madlib	WLIB AM: King of the Wigflip	
September 30	MURS	MURS for President	
September 30	N.W.A.	Family Tree	
September 30	T.I.	Paper Trail	Debuts at No. 1 on the Billboard 200; Singles: "No Matter What", "Whatever You Like", "Swing Ya Rag", "What Up, What's Haapnin'", "Swagga Like Us", "Ready for Whatever", "Live Your Life", "Dead and Gone"; Certified Double Platinum
September 30	Termanology	Politics as Usual	
September 30	Unk	2econd Season	Debuts at No. 104 on the Billboard 200; Singles: "Show Out"
October 7	Devin the Dude	Landing Gear	Debuts at No. 47 on the Billboard 200; Singles: "Can't Make It Home"
October 7	Kutt Calhoun	Feature Presentation	
October 14	Diamond D	The Huge Hefner Chronicles	
October 17	M Trill	Number One	Singles: "Bounce"
October 28	Joe Budden	Halfway House	
October 28	Paris	Acid Reflex	
November 2	Noah23	Upside Down Bluejay	
November 4	Illa J	Yancey Boys	Singles: "We Here", "Sounds Like Love"
November 4	Q-Tip	The Renaissance	Debuts at No. 11 on the Billboard 200; Singles: "Gettin' Up", "Move"
November 4	Unk	2econd Season	Debuts at No. 104 on the Billboard 200; Singles: "Show Out"
November 11	Jedi Mind Tricks	A History of Violence	
November 18	Ace Hood	Gutta	Debuts at No. 36 on the Billboard 200; Singles: "Cash Flow", "Ride", "Ride (Remix)"
November 18	South Park Mexican	The Last Chair Violinist	Debuts at No. 59 on the Billboard 200
November 24	E-40	The Ball Street Journal	Debuts at No. 42 on the Billboard 200; Singles: "Wake It Up"
November 24	Kanye West	808's and Heartbreak	Debuts at No. 1 on the Billboard 200; Singles: "Love Lockdown", "Heartless", "Amazing", "Paranoid"; Certified Platinum; Does not contain the "parental advisory" sticker
November 25	Anybody Killa	Mudface	
November 25	Jim Jones & Skull Gang	Jim Jones & Skull Gang Present A Tribute To Bad Santa Starring Mike Epps	Singles: "Bad Santa Intro", "Jingle Bellz"
December 9	Common	Universal Mind Control	Debuts at No. 12 on the Billboard 200; Singles: "Universal Mind Control," "Announcement"
December 9	EPMD	We Mean Business	
December 16	Plies	Da REAList	Debuts at No. 14 on the Billboard 200; Singles: "Pants Hang Low," "Put It on Ya", "Want It, Need It"
December 16	Soulja Boy	iSouljaBoyTellEm	Debuts at No. 43 on the Billboard 200; Singles: "Bird Walk," "Kiss Me Thru the Phone," "Soulja Boy Tellem," "Turn My Swag On"
December 16	Snoop Dogg	Snoop Dogg Presents Christmas in tha Dogg House	
December 24	Ludacris	Theater of the Mind	Debuts at No. 5 on the Billboard 200; Singles: "What Them Girls Like", "One More Drink", "Nasty Girl"; Certified Gold

== Highest-charting singles ==
Hip hop singles from any year which charted in the 2008 Top 40 of the Billboard Hot 100
Song	Artist	Project	Peak position
"Whatever You Like"	T.I.	Paper Trail	1
"Live Your Life"	T.I. featuring Rihanna	Paper Trail	1
"Lollipop"	Lil Wayne featuring Static Major	Tha Carter III	1
"Low"	Flo Rida featuring T-Pain	Mail on Sunday	1
"Love Lockdown"	Kanye West	808s & Heartbreak	3
"Swagga Like Us"	Jay-Z & T.I. featuring Kanye West & Lil Wayne	Paper Trail	5
"A Milli"	Lil Wayne	Tha Carter III	6
"Can't Believe It"	T-Pain featuring Lil Wayne	Thr33 Ringz	7
"Sensual Seduction"	Snoop Dogg	Ego Trippin'	7
"In the Ayer"	Flo Rida featuring will.i.am	Mail on Sunday	9
"Got Money"	Lil Wayne featuring T-Pain	Tha Carter III	10
"Superstar"	Lupe Fiasco featuring Matthew Santos	The Cool	10
"Put On"	Jeezy featuring Kanye West	The Recession	12
"Sweetest Girl (Dollar Bill)"	Wyclef Jean featuring Akon, Lil Wayne & Niia	Carnival Vol. II: Memoirs of an Immigrant	12
"Mrs. Officer"	Lil Wayne featuring Bobby Valentino & Kidd Kidd	Tha Carter III	16
"Elevator"	Flo Rida featuring Timbaland	Mail on Sunday	16
"The Boss"	Rick Ross featuring T-Pain	Trilla	17
"Lolli Lolli (Pop That Body)"	Three 6 Mafia featuring Project Pat, Yung D & SuperPower	Last 2 Walk	18
"See You in My Nightmares"	Kanye West featuring Lil Wayne	808s & Heartbreak	21
"My Life"	The Game featuring Lil Wayne	LAX	21
"Flashing Lights"	Kanye West featuring Dwele	Graduation	29
"The Business"	Yung Berg featuring Casha	Look What You Made Me	33
"I Won't Tell"	Fat Joe featuring J. Holiday	The Elephant in the Room	37
"Pop Bottles"	Birdman featuring Lil Wayne	5 * Stunna	38
"Out Here Grindin'"	DJ Khaled featuring Akon, Plies, Jeezy, Rick Ross, Ace Hood, Trick Daddy & Boosie BadAzz	We Global	39
"Party People"	Nelly featuring Fergie	Brass Knuckles	40

== Highest first week sales ==
As of December 31, 2008.

Number	Artist	Album	1st week sales	1st week position
1	Lil Wayne	Tha Carter III	1,005,545	#1
2	T.I.	Paper Trail	568,000	#1
3	Kanye West	808s & Heartbreak	450,000	#1
4	Young Jeezy	The Recession	260,000	#1
5	The Game	LAX	240,000	#2
6	Plies	Definition of Real	215,000	#2
7	Ludacris	Theater of the Mind	214,000	#5
8	Rick Ross	Trilla	198,000	#1
9	Nas	Untitled	187,000	#1
10	Snoop Dogg	Ego Trippin'	137,000	#3

== Highest critically reviewed albums (Metacritic) ==
Number	Artist	Album	Average score	Number of reviews	Reference
1	Lil Wayne	Tha Carter III	84	26 reviews	
2	Q-Tip	The Renaissance	82	24 reviews	
3	Bun B	II Trill	82	17 reviews	
4	The Roots	Rising Down	80	27 reviews	
5	Gnarls Barkley	The Odd Couple	76	35 reviews	
6	Why?	Alopecia	76	21 reviews	
7	Roots Manuva	Slime & Reason	76	16 reviews	
8	Kanye West	808s & Heartbreak	75	36 reviews	
9	T.I.	Paper Trail	74	19 reviews	
10	Murs	Murs for President	74	15 reviews	

== See also ==
- Previous article: 2007 in hip-hop
- Next article: 2009 in hip-hop
