= Real Hitta =

Single by Plies featuring Kodak Black

Single by Plies featuring Kodak Black

from the album F.E.M.A.
- Released: May 6, 2017
- Length: 3:51
- Label: Slip-n-Slide; Big Gates; Atlantic
- Songwriters: Algernod Washington; Dieuson Octave
- Producers: Bizness Boi; Th3ory

Plies singles chronology
"Racks Up to My Ear" (2016)	"Real Hitta" (2017)	"Check Callin" (2017)

Kodak Black singles chronology
"Horses" (2017)	"Real Hitta" (2017)	"ISpy (Remix)" (2017)

Music video
- "Real Hitta" on YouTube

"Real Hitta" is a song by American rapper Plies featuring American rapper Kodak Black. It was released on May 6, 2017, as the lead single from their collaborative mixtape F.E.M.A. (2017). It was produced by Bizness Boi and Th3ory.

== Background ==
According to Kodak Black's engineer Derek Garcia, "Real Hitta" was recorded for Black's album Painting Pictures, but was not included in the final version.

== Composition ==
The song sees the rappers wondering if their lovers have ever been in love with a thug before. It contains a sung hook by Kodak Black. Plies raps about selling drugs in a Trump Hotel, as well as what he can spend money on for his girlfriend.

== Critical reception ==
Peter A. Berry of XXL favorably compared the song to Plies' 2007 song "Shawty", of which he stated that "Real Hitta" is "pretty much the exact opposite" for the reason that it features "rugged, but effortlessly emotive vocals from the Project Baby instead of T-Pain's glossy Auto-Tune."

== Music video ==
The music video was released in June 2017. It features appearances from an old man with tattooed forearms and hoop earrings who imitates Kodak Black and mouths the lyrics, a bikini-clad model, a man in dreadlocks, a man in the military, "bouncing women", a couple in love and a "sorority redhead". The old man, known online as OG Magnum, is also seen holding a cigarette and a plastic cup, and hanging out beside a muscle car surrounded by two dancing young women. Plies and Kodak Black do not appear in the video.

== Charts ==
Chart (2017)	Peak position
US Billboard Hot 100	100
US Hot R&B/Hip-Hop Songs (Billboard)	42
