= Becky (song) =

Single by Plies

from the album Goon Affiliated
- Released: June 19, 2009
- Recorded: 2009
- Genre: Hip-hop
- Length: 3:24
- Label: Big Gates, Slip-n-Slide, Atlantic
- Songwriter(s): Algernod Washington, J. R. Rotem
- Producer(s): J.R. Rotem

Plies singles chronology
"Plenty Money" (2009)	"Becky" (2009)	"Headboard" (2009)

"Becky" is the first single of Plies's fourth album, Goon Affiliated. The track was released on the internet by Plies via his Twitter.

The song had its radio station premiere on Power 107.1 in Macon, Georgia on June 23, 2009. The song has since sold over 2,789,000 copies, also peaked at number #1 on Bubbling Under Hot 100 and Hot R&B/Hip-Hop Songs.

It's also the 6th time Plies and producer J.R. Rotem have worked together. They worked together on Plies previous singles "Bust It Baby Pt. 2" featuring Ne-Yo and "Want It, Need It" featuring Ashanti.

== Music video ==
The video premiered on September 22, 2009. Freeway and Rick Ross make cameos appearances in the video. The song refers to a woman who is good at performing oral sex, in which "Becky" is a slang term.

== Chart performance ==
Chart (2009)	Peak position
U.S. Billboard Bubbling Under Hot 100	1
U.S. Billboard Hot R&B/Hip-Hop Songs	32

== Certifications ==
Region	Certification	Certified units/sales
United States (RIAA)	Gold	500,000^{*}
^{*} Sales figures based on certification alone.
