= La La La (Auburn song) =

Single by Auburn featuring Iyaz & Sean Paul
- Released: June 1, 2010
- Recorded: 2009
- Genre: Pop; Dancehall; Reggae-Pop; R&B; Electropop; Caribbean Music; Hip-Hop/Rap
- Length: 3:12
- Label: Cherrytree Records; Interscope Records; Konvict Muzik; Universal Music Group; Geffen Records; Island Records; Republic Records
- Songwriters: Auburn; Sean Paul; Iyaz; Jared Cotter; Kerry "Krucial" Brothers; Fayola; Jr. Blender
- Producers: Jr. Blender; RedOne; Teddy Rliey; Cirkut; Sean Paul; Ivan Corraliza; Iyaz

Auburn singles chronology
"La La La" (2010)	"All About Him" (2010)

Iyaz singles chronology
"Pyramid" (2010)	"La La La" (2010)	"So Big" (2010)

"La La La" is the debut single by American singer Auburn. It was initially the lead single of her sophomore album Times Change, originally set to be released August 10, 2010. The track features British Virgin Islands singer Iyaz, and was produced by J. R. Rotem. Released in June 2010, it reached number 51 on the Billboard Hot 100, and number 22 on the Mainstream Top 40 airplay chart. The song interpolates ATC's "Around the World (La La La La La)".

== Music video ==
The music video premiered on September 9, 2010. The music video entails Auburn hanging out with two backup dancers and venting her frustrations towards her boyfriend who is very possessive and insecure, always believing she's cheating on him. While she insists she loves him, she makes it clear she is at her wits end with his paranoia. After one phone call too many and the boyfriend coming over to confront him, Auburn has enough and dumps him through the lyrics of the song, and throws his phone in the aquarium.

== Track listing ==
- Digital download
1. "La La La" (featuring Iyaz) – 3:12

== Charts ==
Chart (2010)	Peak position
Canada CHR/Top 40 (Billboard)	42
US Billboard Hot 100	51
US Pop Airplay (Billboard)	22
US Rhythmic Airplay (Billboard)	36

== Certifications ==
Region	Certification	Certified units/sales
United States (RIAA)	Gold	500,000^{*}
^{*} Sales figures based on certification alone.

== Release history ==
Region	Date	Format(s)	Label(s)	Ref.
United States	June 1, 2010	Digital download	Warner Bros.	
United States	June 8, 2010	Contemporary hit radio	Warner Bros.	
