= Medicine (Plies song) =

Single by Plies featuring Keri Hilson

from the album Goon Affiliated
- Released: October 10, 2009; January 9, 2010 (U.S. radio airplay)
- Recorded: 2009
- Genre: Hip hop
- Length: 3:31
- Label: Big Gates; Slip-n-Slide; Atlantic
- Songwriters: Algernod Washington; Keri Hilson
- Producer: Polow da Don

Plies singles chronology
"Wasted" (2009)	"Medicine" (2009)	"Hey Daddy (Daddy's Home)" (2009)

Keri Hilson singles chronology
"Hold My Hand" (2009)	"Medicine" (2009)	"I Like" (2009)

Music video
- "Plies - Medicine [feat. Keri Hilson] (Video)" on YouTube

"Medicine" is the first promo single of American hip hop recording artist Plies' fourth studio album, Goon Affiliated. The track is absent from the retail versions for unknown reasons, but is on the Amazon deluxe version. The hip hop track features American singer-songwriter Keri Hilson. There are two versions, one with a more radio friendly, slow beat and one with a more club beat.

The original version of the song was by Three 6 Mafia ft. Gucci Mane & Keri Hilson under the same title. The tempo is somewhat slower in that version.

The song contains a sample of "Ex fan des sixties" by Jane Birkin and composed by French singer and songwriter Serge Gainsbourg.

== Music video ==
A music video was shot for the song and premiered on January 14, 2010. It takes place in a hospital where Keri Hilson plays a nurse and Plies is the doctor which makes reference to the song. Myammee from VH1 also makes a cameo in the beginning of the video.

== Chart performance ==
Chart (2009–2010)	Peak position
US Bubbling Under Hot 100 (Billboard)	7
US Hot R&B/Hip-Hop Songs (Billboard)	47
US Hot Rap Songs (Billboard)	21
US Rhythmic Airplay (Billboard)	32
