= Auburn (singer) =

American singer-songwriter (born 1989)

- Born: Auburn Gabrielle Williams; December 2, 1989 (age 36)
- Origin: Minnesota, U.S.
- Genres: Pop; R&B; hip hop; urban
- Occupations: Singer; songwriter
- Instrument: Vocals
- Years active: 2006–2020
- Labels: Beluga Heights; Def Jam; Asylum; Warner Bros.; TM3; Atlantic
- Website: callmeauburn.com (Currently Down)

Auburn Gabrielle Williams (born December 2, 1989), known mononymously as Auburn, is an American singer-songwriter. She released an independent debut album, Same Giirl in 2007, which spawned the underground hit "Ewww Ewww". The song reached number six on DJ Booth's Underground chart. She then signed to Warner Bros. and Beluga Heights in early 2008 and released her first official single "La La La" (sample of ATC's 2000 song) in mid-2010. She then went on to release "Leaked" in 2016.

== Life and career ==
=== 1989–2007: Early life ===
Auburn began singing at a young age but didn't aspire to be a professional singer. In 2004, she began using Myspace.com to share her music with her friends. She began gaining a big fan-base and in late 2007, she released her independent debut album Same GiiRL, which gained some buzz, and also the attention of J.R. Rotem, owner of the record label Beluga Heights. The album was preceded by a single, "Ewww Ewww", featuring Chellii-B, which reached number six on the underground hip-hop chart at DJBooth.net.

=== 2008–present: Beginnings ===
Auburn gained the attention of J.R. Rotem with her first independent album. In early 2008, Williams signed to Beluga Heights with full contract with TM3 Records (2011), and distribution from Warner Bros. and Universal as the label's first female artist. She subsequently began work on her mainstream debut album.

Auburn's first official single, "La La La" featuring Iyaz, was released on June 1, 2010. The single debuted at #74 on the Billboard Hot 100 in July 2010 and peaked at #51 on the chart.

Auburn was the opening act for Jason Derulo's tour in Fall 2010. Her second single entitled "All About Him" was released on November 26, 2010. This song became a big hit in the Philippines, Singapore and Malaysia. A remix to the song, titled "All About Him (Pt. 2)", features hip-hop rapper Tyga and was released for digital download on February 15, 2011. "Perfect Two" was confirmed as the third single from her debut album and was released for digital download on April 29, 2011. On January 12, 2013, Auburn released her fourth single "My Baby" for digital download.

== Discography ==
=== Projects ===
| Title | Details | Peak position |
| Title | Details | US |
|---|---|---|
| Same Giirl | Release date: September 11, 2007; Label: FS Music; Formats: CD, music download | – |
| Cocoon | Release date: 2014; Label: Planned; Formats: Digital download | – |
| Leaked (EP) | Release date: July 15, 2016; Label: Independent; Formats: Streaming | - |

=== Singles ===
| Year | Title | Peak chart positions | | | | | | Album |
| Year | Title | US | US Digital | US Heat | US Pop | US Airplay | US Rhythmic | Album |
|---|---|---|---|---|---|---|---|---|
| 2010 | "La La La" (feat. Iyaz) | 51 | 39 | 1 | 22 | 74 | 36 | N/A |
| 2010 | "All About Him" | — | — | — | — | — | — | N/A |
| 2010 | "Best Friend" | — | — | — | — | — | — | N/A |
| 2011 | "Perfect Two" | — | — | — | — | — | — | N/A |
| 2012 | "Incredible" | — | — | — | — | — | — | N/A |
| 2013 | "My Baby" | — | — | — | — | — | — | Leaked |
| 2013 | "Love Calling" | — | — | — | — | — | — | Leaked |
| 2013 | "Deep" | — | — | — | — | — | — | Leaked |
| 2014 | "Honor" | — | — | — | — | — | — | Cocoon (*No Record of this album*) |
| 2014 | "The Birds" (feat. TryBishop) | — | — | — | — | — | — | Cocoon (*No Record of this album*) |
| 2014 | "Pilgrim" | — | — | — | — | — | — | Cocoon (*No Record of this album*) |
