= Goon Affiliated =

Studio album by Plies
- Released: June 8, 2010
- Recorded: 2009–2010
- Genre: Southern hip hop; dirty rap
- Length: 55:00
- Label: Big Gates; Slip-n-Slide; Atlantic
- Producer: Ted "Touche" Lucas (exec.); Ronnell "Big Gates" Levatte (exec.); Chef Tone; Kori Anders; Big Jones; Dunlap; J.U.S.T.I.C.E. League; Zaytoven; Clinton Sparks; Kamau Georges; BC of Necronam; J.R. Rotem; Dynamic; Troy Taylor; Friky Zeek; Fatboi; Polow da Don

Plies chronology
Da REAList (2008)	Goon Affiliated (2010)	The Real Testament II (2020)

Singles from Goon Affiliated
- 1. "Becky" Released: June 19, 2009; 2. "Medicine" Released: October 10, 2009; 3. "She Got It Made" Released: March 5, 2010; 4. "Awesome" Released: March 2010

Goon Affiliated is the fourth studio album by American rapper Plies. It was released on June 8, 2010, by Big Gates Records, Slip-n-Slide Records and Atlantic Records.

== Background ==
Goon Affiliated was recorded between the fall of 2009 and the spring of 2010, set to be released just six months after Plies' previous album, Da Realist. As early as April 2009, Plies began assembling his "dream team" roster of rappers and producers for the project, immediately after the release of his single "Plenty Money". Plies explained that having his brother with him during the recording of the album was very important.

In an August 2009 interview with MTV.com, Plies discussed the meaning behind the track "First 48":

"I got a song right now called 'First 48,' " the Florida native revealed. "It's wrapped around the whole TV series 'The First 48 Hours.' I'm telling you on the record: 'Everybody is a goon until they catch a case/ When the detectives get to the talking/ All that gangsta sh-- fades away/ The first 10 minutes, dog, you started off straight/ Detective applied a little pressure, you turn around and break.' That whole situation for me, that intro, I'm sitting here watching TV, and I didn't know it was that many unreal dudes still left in the streets," he continued. "I just focused on that situation. That's one of them records on my album I call 'choir rehearsal.' I know everybody is gonna sing it every time I perform it."

Additionally, Plies explained the title of the album:

"Goon Affiliated, I had the pleasure of having my brother home for this album," he told us of the LP's title while parked on his tour bus in ATL. "He actually came up with the title of this album. The three previous albums, 'real' was incorporated into the album title. For me, we felt Goon Affiliated wasn't too gangsta, wasn't too soft. It was right in the middle. Kids in the suburbs could have goon friends and be goon affiliated. You could be a street cat and not call yourself a 'goon' but have goon homeboys and be goon affiliated. Or you could be a goon and be goon affiliated. It's a whole diverse situation for me."

The song "Look Like", which features rap verses from Young Jeezy & Fabolous is the first song on any of Plies' albums to feature other rappers.

== Promotion ==
In June 2009, Plies allegedly threw $12 into a concert crowd in Atlanta, Georgia, in promotion of Goon Affiliated, as he performed his final single before Goon Affiliated, "Plenty Money". Later that month, Plies released his track "Becky". In April 2010, Plies announced his "Goon Affiliated 25 Day Giveaway Contest". Fans called a toll-free hotline from May 1 to May 25, 2010, and if Plies picked up the phone, the caller won a prize. Plies pledged to give away iPads, jewelry from his personal collection, as well as scholarships for college, health care payments, mortgage payments, and other big-ticket items.

=== Singles ===
"Becky", the first official single was released in June 2009 and peaked at number 32 on the Billboard Hot R&B/Hip-Hop Songs chart and number 14 on the Hot Rap Tracks chart, The second single was "She Got It Made", featuring Bei Maejor. It was released on March 5, 2010. The first promotional single was "Medicine", featuring Keri Hilson. It peaked at number 47 on the Billboard Hot R&B/Hip-Hop Songs and number 21 on the Hot Rap Tracks. This track didn't make the final product.

== Reception ==
=== Commercial performance ===
The album debuted at number five on the US Billboard 200 chart with sales of 56,000 copies. Goon Affiliated stopped at number eighteen on the Billboard 200 the following week and sold 21,000 copies, bringing the sales total to 77,000. The album crossed the 150,000 sold mark on July 18, 2010 becoming the fourth of his albums to cross that benchmark.

=== Critical reception ===
Professional ratings
Review scores
Source	Rating
AllMusic	3/5 stars
HipHopDX	1.5/5 stars
USA Today	2.5/4 stars

The album was released to mixed reviews from music critics. Edwin Ortiz of HipHopDX gave the album a 1.5 out of 5 stars. He disliked tracks "Bruh Bruh", "Rob Myself", "Awesome" and "Good Dick" while liking "Go Live", "Look Like" and "Kitty Kitty".

== Track listing ==
The track listing was confirmed by AllMusic.

No.	Title	Writer(s)	Producer(s)	Length
1.	"Go Live"	Brandon Crear aka Yung Necro Music; Plies; Ronell "Big Gates" Levatte	Yung Necro Music	3:32
2.	"Rob Myself"	Erik Ortiz; Kevin Crowe; Plies	J.U.S.T.I.C.E. League	4:03
3.	"Awesome"	Plies; Xavier Dotson	Zaytoven	3:38
4.	"Bruh Bruh"	Plies; Dotson	Zaytoven	3:25
5.	"Get My Niggas Out"	L. Jones; Plies; Gates	Big Jones	3:41
6.	"Flaw"	Jones; Plies; Gates	Big Jones	3:13
7.	"Becky"	J. R. Rotem; Plies	J. R. Rotem	3:20
8.	"Kitty Kitty" (featuring Trey Songz)	Plies; Tony "Chef Tone" Scales; Tremaine Neverson; Troy Taylor	Chef Tone; Taylor	3:32
9.	"Whatever I Say"	Plies; Gates	Dunlap Exclusive	3:16
10.	"Goonette"	Crear; Plies; Gates	BC of Necronam	3:40
11.	"Good Dick"	Plies; Xavier Murray; Gates	Friky Zeek AKA Revenue	4:17
12.	"Model"	Ladamon Douglas; Plies	FATBOI	3:48
13.	"Look Like" (featuring Fabolous and Young Jeezy)	Plies, Gates	Dynamic	4:38
14.	"All I Know"	D. Anefils; Ortiz; Crowe; Plies	J.U.S.T.I.C.E. League	3:30
15.	"She Got It Made" (Additional vocals by Bei Maejor)	Brandon Green; Clinton Sparks; Plies	Sparks; Kamau Georges	3:27

iTunes bonus tracks
No.	Title	Producer(s)	Length
16.	"Chirpin' " (featuring Fella)	Big Jones	3:59
17.	"Letter"	BC of Necronam	4:39
18.	"Medicine" (featuring Keri Hilson)	Polow da Don	3:31
19.	"Bricks on Me" (featuring Fella)	Zaytoven	4:20

== Personnel ==
Credits for Goon Affiliated adapted from AllMusic.

- Plies - Executive Producer
- Zaytoven - Producer
- Chris Wheeler - Design
- Bryan Tyson - Engineer
- Troy Taylor - Composer, Producer, Engineer
- Clinton Sparks - Composer, Producer
- Glenn Schick - Mastering
- J. R. Rotem - Producer
- Gee Roberson - A&R
- Brian Ranney - Package Production
- Brian Pedersen - Assistant
- Carlos Oyanedel - Assistant
- Jean Nelson - A&R
- Charles Moniz - Engineer
- Mike Miller - Assistant
- Graham Marsh (producer) - Engineer
- Rob Marks - Mixing
- Bei Maejor - Vocals, Vocal Producer
- Ted "Touche" Lucas - Executive Producer
- Ronnell "Big Gates" Levatte - Executive Producer
- J.U.S.T.I.C.E. League - Producer
- Patrick Hoelck - Photography
- Dorian "DP" Hendricks - Vocal Engineer
- Rob Gold - Photo Production
- Kamau Georges - Producer
- Friky Zeek - Producer
- Patrick Fong - Art Direction, Design
- Trina Edwards - A&R
- Dynamic - Producer
- Dunlap Exclusive - Producer
- Anne Declemente - A&R
- Otha "Vakseen" Davis III - Product Manager
- Bob Croslin - Cover Photo
- Chefton - Producer
- Leslie Brathwaite - Mixing
- Big Jones - Producer
- BC - Producer
- Kori Anders - Producer, Engineer
- "RJ" Jacques - Technical Production

== Charts ==
Chart (2010)	Peak position
US Billboard 200	5
US Top Rap Albums	1
US Top R&B/Hip Hop Albums	1
