= Da REAList =

Studio album by Plies
- Released: December 16, 2008
- Recorded: 2008
- Genre: Southern hip hop; dirty rap
- Length: 64:43
- Label: Big Gates; Slip-n-Slide; Atlantic
- Producer: Mannie Fresh; DJ Toomp; Drumma Boy; DVS; T-Minus; Sean Garrett; J.R. Rotem; DJ Infamous; Midnight Black

Plies chronology
Definition of Real (2008)	Da REAList (2008)	Goon Affiliated (2010)

Singles from Da REAList
- 1. "Put It on Ya" Released: October 7, 2008; 2. "Want It, Need It" Released: January 5, 2009; 3. "Plenty Money" Released: February 16, 2009

Professional ratings
Review scores
Source	Rating
About	(unfavorable)
AllMusic	3.5/5 stars
Billboard	(favorable)
The Boston Globe	(favorable)
DJBooth	3.5/5 stars
IGN	(7.0/10)
RapReviews	7.5/10 stars
Rolling Stone	2/5 stars
Slant Magazine	1.5/5 stars
XXL	4/5 stars

Da REAList is the third studio album by American rapper Plies. It was released on December 16, 2008, by Big Gates Records, Slip-n-Slide Records and Atlantic Records.

The album was released just six months after his previous release, Definition of Real, with re-teaming with producers and rapper Drumma Boy, No I.D. and DVS. Additional production by Mannie Fresh, T-Minus and DJ Infamous among others.

Da REAList was released to more mixed and lukewarm reviews among critics than his previous albums. The album has reached number fourteen on the US Billboard 200.

== Background ==
The rapper re-entered recording studios shortly after the released of his preview album The Real Testament to begin working with producers Drumma Boy, Mannie Fresh, DJ Infamous and many others. Plies also collaborated with R&B newcomer Chris J, Sean Garrett, and was originally supposed to be released on Definition of Real but didn't make the final track listing.

The first buzz about the album was started after the release of Definition of Real, where the back page of the album booklet had a statement about the album title and the release date. /

== Chart performance ==
The album debuted at number one on Billboard's Top Rap Albums chart, and number fourteen on the Billboard 200, with sales of 114,438 copies in its first week. It is Plies lowest charting album to date, which spent twenty weeks on the Billboard 200. The album has sold over 326,149 copies as of December 4, 2009.

The single "Pants Hang Low" was released on iTunes on September 23, 2008 as a promo single. Plies was one of the few to speak out against the belt-less pants ban in southern cities.

For me, being where I'm from, understanding the legal system and the culture I'm a part of, I felt it was a statement record, we got a lot of cats…they had a situation in Riviera Beach, Florida, not too far from my hometown. It was a group of guys that were harassed and arrested and incarcerated for a fashion statement. I'mma always stand in the forefront and do what I feel is right. The record had a lot of sentimental value to it. - Plies

Da REAList spawned three singles: The album's lead single, "Put It on Ya", became one of Plies biggest hits, reaching number 31 on the U.S. Billboard Hot 100 chart and number 8 on the Hot R&B/Hip-Hop Singles & Tracks chart. Follow-up single "Want It, Need It", which featured R&B singer Ashanti, barely made it on the Billboard Hot 100 at number ninety-six, but reached the Hot R&B/Hip-Hop Singles & Tracks chart at twenty-one. The third and final single, "Plenty Money" received a radio airplay released and shared the same success as the last single. Although the singles "Spend The Night" was going to be the album final single and plans for a Philip Andelman direction video, it was cancelled due to Plies working on his fourth album, Goon Affiliated.

A music video for the song "Pants Hang Low" featuring Mannie Fresh was released on December 15, 2008.

== Track listing ==
Standard edition
No.	Title	Writer(s)	Producer(s)	Length
1.	"Me & My Goons"	Plies; Brandon Crear; Ronell Levatte; Alexander Martin	Necronam	4:07
2.	"Fuck U Gon' Do Bout It"	Plies; Levatte; Martin	Trae Coner	3:17
3.	"Gotta Be"	Plies; Crear; Levatte; Martin	Necronam	4:21
4.	"Want It, Need It" (featuring Ashanti)	Plies; Jonathan Rotem; Darnell Bristol; Sidney Johnson; Kenneth Edmonds	J.R. Rotem	3:50
5.	"Plenty Money"	Plies; Christopher Gholson	Drumma Boy	3:54
6.	"Family Straight"	Plies; Marco Rodriguez-Diaz; Laurent Cohen	DJ Infamous; Laurent "Slick" Cohen	3:45
7.	"Make a Movie"	Plies; Daniel Valbrun; Joseph Valbrun; Levatte; Martin	DVS Productions	3:12
8.	"2nd Chance"	Plies; Bryan Tyson; Levatte; Martin	Bryan Tyson	5:05
9.	"Spend the Night"	Plies; Maurice Jordan; LaQuan Williams	Kenoe; Young Kwon	3:36
10.	"Heard of Me"	Plies; D. Valbrun; J. Valbrun; Levatte; Martin	DVS Productions	3:53
11.	"All Black"	Plies; Tyson; Levatte; Martin	Bryan Tyson	4:14
12.	"Street Light" (featuring Sean Garrett)	Plies; Sean Garrett; Tracey Sewell	Sean "The Pen" Garrett; Midnight Black	3:38
13.	"I Chase Paper"	Plies; Gholson	Drumma Boy	4:12
14.	"Pants Hang Low"	Plies; Byron Thomas	Mannie Fresh	3:56
15.	"Co-Defendant"	Plies; Tyler Williams; Levatte; Martin	T-Minus	4:27
16.	"Put It on Ya" (featuring Chris J)	Plies; Ernest Wilson; Theron Thomas; Timothy Thomas	No I.D.	4:18

Circuit City bonus tracks
No.	Title	Producer(s)	Length
17.	"Gon Do"	Necronam	2:05
18.	"Can't Cry"	DVS Productions	3:04

Sample credits

- "Want It, Need It" contains interpolations of the composition "Two Occasions", written by Darnell Bristol, Sidney Johnson, and Kenneth Edmonds.

== Charts and certifications ==
=== Weekly charts ===
Chart (2009)	Peak position
US Billboard 200	14
US Top R&B/Hip-Hop Albums (Billboard)	4
US Top Rap Albums (Billboard)	1

=== Year-end charts ===
Chart (2009)	Position
US Billboard 200	94
US Top R&B/Hip-Hop Albums (Billboard)	13
US Top Rap Albums (Billboard)	6

=== Certifications ===
Region	Certification	Certified units/sales
United States (RIAA)	Gold	500,000^{‡}
^{‡} Sales+streaming figures based on certification alone.
