= Rock (Plies song) =

Song by Plies

Promotional single by Plies

from the album Ain't No Mixtape Bih 3
- Released: March 16, 2018
- Recorded: 2017
- Genre: Hip hop; trap
- Length: 2:54
- Label: Slip-n-Slide; Atlantic
- Songwriter: Algernod Washington
- Producers: 30 Roc; Cheeze Beatz

Music video
- "Rock" on YouTube

"Rock" is a song by American rapper Plies. It is a promotional single from his mixtape Ain't No Mixtape Bih 3 (2017). The song was produced by 30 Roc and Cheeze Beatz. In early 2018, it became a viral sensation on the Internet and peaked at number 95 on the Billboard Hot 100.

== Composition ==
The song finds Plies rapping about his love and appreciation for a woman loyal to him. It heavily samples "Late Night Tip" by Three 6 Mafia, nearly identical in instrumental.

== Music video ==
A music video for the song was released on December 25, 2017 and directed by Omar The Director. In it, Plies roams the halls of luxurious mansion with his girlfriend. He gives her a piggyback ride, and goes bowling with her.

== Charts ==
| Chart (2018) | Peak position |
|---|---|
| US Billboard Hot 100 | 95 |
| US Hot R&B/Hip-Hop Songs (Billboard) | 40 |
