= Hypnotized (Plies song) =

Single by Plies featuring Akon

from the album The Real Testament and Step Up 2 the Streets (soundtrack)
- Released: September 11, 2007
- Recorded: 2007
- Genre: Dirty rap
- Length: 3:07
- Label: Big Gates, Slip-n-Slide, Atlantic
- Songwriters: Algernod Washington, Aliaune Thiam
- Producer: Akon

Plies singles chronology
"I'm So Hood" (2007)	"Hypnotized" (2007)	"Bust It Baby" (2008)

Akon singles chronology
"Am I Dreaming" (2007)	"Hypnotized" (2007)	"Get Buck in Here" (2007)

Music video
- "Hypnotized" on YouTube

"Hypnotized" is a 2007 song and the second single from Plies' debut album, The Real Testament. The track is produced by Akon, as well as featured. The video for the single was released. The single made the top twenty of the Billboard Hot 100, at #14. The song is featured on the soundtrack of the film Step Up 2 the Streets. A remix version was released featuring Rick Ross, Flo Rida and Webbie with a mixed beat.

== Music video ==
Directed by Gil Green, the video features Plies and Akon at a party in which Plies is attracted by women shaking their bodies that it makes him feel like he's going into a trance when seeing them.

== Charts ==
=== Weekly charts ===
Chart (2007–2008)	Peak position
US Billboard Hot 100	14
US Hot R&B/Hip-Hop Songs (Billboard)	22
US Hot Rap Songs (Billboard)	3
US Pop Airplay (Billboard)	23
US Rhythmic (Billboard)	2

=== Year-end charts ===
Chart (2008)	Position
US Billboard Hot 100	77
US Hot R&B/Hip-Hop Songs (Billboard)	97
US Rhythmic (Billboard)	18

== Certifications ==
Region	Certification	Certified units/sales
New Zealand (RMNZ)	2× Platinum	60,000^{‡}
United States (RIAA)	Platinum	1,000,000^{‡}
^{‡} Sales+streaming figures based on certification alone.
