= Wasted (Gucci Mane song) =

Single by Gucci Mane featuring Plies

from the album The State vs. Radric Davis
- Released: September 26, 2009
- Recorded: 2009
- Genre: Trap
- Length: 4:08; 4:34 (Mixtape Version)
- Label: 1017 Brick Squad, Warner Bros., Asylum
- Songwriters: Radric Davis, Algernod Washington, LaDamon "FATBOI" Douglas
- Producer: FATBOI

Gucci Mane singles chronology
"Break Up" (2009)	"Wasted" (2009)	"LOL :-)" (2009)

Plies singles chronology
"Headboard" (2009)	"Wasted" (2009)	"Medicine" (2009)

"Wasted" is the official first single from Gucci Mane's sixth studio album The State vs. Radric Davis. The song features rapper Plies. The song was originally from Gucci Mane's 2009 mixtape, Guccimania.

== Remixes and freestyles ==
The main official remix of the song has a new verse by Gucci Mane, and features Lil Wayne, Jadakiss, & Birdman. It was released on October 29, 2009. The remix is the final track of the album. The clean version of the remix's chorus uses the explicit version's chorus, unlike the clean version of the original version of "Wasted".

The second official remix, the original remix version, features rapper OJ Da Juiceman, replacing Plies' verse, and appears on Gucci Mane's EP Wasted: The Prequel and his mixtape Gangsta Grillz: The Movie Part 2 - The Sequel with Plies on the mixtape.

Lil Wayne recorded a freestyle over the instrumental for his mixtape No Ceilings. The first 12 bars of the freestyle was used for the official remix.

Soulja Boy Tell 'Em which featured an artist out of UTAH by the name of SEE-SMOKE, Of One9Entertainment has also recorded a freestyle over the instrumental for two of his mixtapes, Dat Piff and Paranormal Activity.

Ludacris rapped over the beat on his mixtape The Conjure Mixtape: A Hustler's Spirit.

Two years before his death, labelmate Slim Dunkin freestyled the song in his Built 4 Interrogation (Hosted by Waka Flocka Flame) mixtape over Gucci Mane's first verse. Waka Flocka Flame was featured on the second verse, and Gucci Mane rapped his third verse and chorus from the original song.

== Music video ==
The music video premiered on October 5, 2009. Sean Garrett, Jim Jones, Rocko, FATBOI, Frenchie, Wooh da Kid, Waka Flocka Flame, Snoop Dogg, and Shawty Lo all make cameo appearances.

== Charts ==
The single was Gucci Mane's most successful single until "Black Beatles" in 2016 and reached the top five on both the Hot R&B/Hip-Hop Songs and Rap Songs charts. The song also debuted at #95 on the Billboard Hot 100 on the week ending September 19, 2009 and has since moved up to #36 becoming Gucci Mane's first top 40 as lead artist.

=== Weekly charts ===
Chart (2009)	Peak position
US Billboard Hot 100	36
US Hot R&B/Hip-Hop Songs (Billboard)	3
US Hot Rap Songs (Billboard)	3

=== Year-end charts ===
Chart (2009)	Position
US Hot R&B/Hip-Hop Songs (Billboard)	37
Chart (2010)	Position
US Hot R&B/Hip-Hop Songs (Billboard)	73

== Certifications ==
Region	Certification	Certified units/sales
United States (RIAA)	Platinum	1,000,000^{‡}
^{‡} Sales+streaming figures based on certification alone.
