= Wake It Up =

Single by E-40 featuring Akon

from the album The Ball Street Journal
- Released: August 16, 2008
- Recorded: 2007
- Genre: Hip hop
- Length: 4:01
- Label: BME, Sick Wid It, Reprise, Warner Bros.
- Songwriters: Earl Stevens, Aliaune Thiam
- Producer: Matt Price

E-40 singles chronology
"Candy (Drippin' Like Water)" (2007)	"Wake It Up" (2008)	"Break Ya Ankles" (2008)

Akon singles chronology
"Out Here Grindin" (2008)	"Wake It Up" (2008)	"Right Now (Na Na Na)" (2008)

"Wake It Up" is the first single off E-40's 11th studio album The Ball Street Journal. It features Akon who uses the auto-tune effect. It was produced by Matt Price.

== Music video ==
The music video for the song was released on iTunes and has also been shown on BET's 106 & Park.

== Charts ==
Chart (2008)	Peak position
US Bubbling Under Hot 100 (Billboard)	17
US Hot R&B/Hip-Hop Songs (Billboard)	87
US Pop 100 (Billboard)	78
US Rhythmic Airplay (Billboard)	25

== Release history ==
Region	Date	Format(s)	Label(s)	Ref.
United States	August 11, 2008	Rhythmic contemporary radio	Sick Wid It, Reprise	
United States	August 25, 2008	Contemporary hit radio	Sick Wid It, Reprise	
