= The Ball Street Journal =

Studio album by E-40
- Released: November 24, 2008
- Recorded: 2007–2008
- Genre: Hip hop
- Length: 61:39
- Labels: Sick Wid It; BME; Reprise
- Producers: Lil Jon; J. R. Rotem; Rick Rock; Drumma Boy; Droop-E; T-Pain; Matt Price; Poli Paul; Tha Bizness; DJ Nasty & LVM; The Runners; Bosko; DJ Fingaz; D-Animals

E-40 chronology
My Ghetto Report Card (2006)	The Ball Street Journal (2008)	Revenue Retrievin': Day Shift (2010)

Singles from The Ball Street Journal
- 1. "Wake It Up" Released: August 16, 2008

Professional ratings
Review scores
Source	Rating
AllMusic	3/5 stars
DJBooth	3.5/5 stars
HipHopDX	3.5/5 stars
Okayplayer	(81/100)
RapReviews	(8/10)

The Ball Street Journal is the tenth studio album by American rapper E-40. It was released on November 24, 2008, by Sick Wid It Records, BME Recordings and Reprise Records. The first single from the album is "Wake It Up" featuring Akon, while the second is "Break Ya Ankles" featuring Shawty Lo. The album debuted at number 42 on the U.S. Billboard 200 chart, with 50,000 copies in its first-week of sales, and has since sold over 450,000 copies.

The album features guest appearances by Shawty Lo, Turf Talk, The Game, Snoop Dogg, T-Pain, Rock City, Akon, Bun B, Gucci Mane, Sammie, Ice-T, Too Short, Cousin Fik, Kevin Cossom, B-Legit, Bosko & Suga-T. A photo shoot of the album appeared in an episode of the second season of From G's to Gents. "Got Rich Twice" featuring Turf Talk was released as a promo single on September 30, 2008, while "Poor Man's Hydraulics" was released as a promo single on October 28.

== Track listing ==
No.	Title	Writer(s)	Producer(s)	Length
1.	"The Ambassador"	Earl Stevens; Ricardo Thomas; Thomas Jackson; Ishmael Butler; Craig Irving; Mariana Viera	Rick Rock	3:45
2.	"I'm On One"	E. Stevens; Thomas; Douglas Davis; Ricky Walters	Rick Rock	4:58
3.	"Break Ya Ankles" (featuring Shawty Lo)	E. Stevens; Jonathan Smith; Carlos Walker	Lil Jon	4:00
4.	"Got Rich Twice" (featuring Turf Talk)	E. Stevens; Earl Stevens, Jr.; Demar Bernstein	Droop-E	3:43
5.	"Pain No More" (featuring The Game and Snoop Dogg)	E. Stevens; Jonathan Reuven Rotem; Sly Jordan; Jayceon Taylor; Calvin Broadus	J.R. Rotem	5:45
6.	"Tell It Like It Is"	E. Stevens; Thomas	Rick Rock	4:00
7.	"Give Her the Keys" (featuring T-Pain)	E. Stevens; Faheem Najm	T-Pain	4:10
8.	"Hustle" (featuring Turf Talk and R. City)	E. Stevens; Smith; Bernstein; Theron Thomas; Timothy Thomas; Jamil Debardlabon	Lil Jon	4:17
9.	"Wake It Up" (featuring Akon)	E. Stevens; Aliaune Thiam; Matthew Price	Matt Price	4:01
10.	"40 Water"	E. Stevens; Smith; James Phillips; R. Sims; M. Harris	Lil Jon	3:39
11.	"Poor Man's Hydraulics"	E. Stevens; E. Stevens, Jr.	Droop-E	4:23
12.	"The Recipe" (featuring Bun B and Gucci Mane)	E. Stevens; Paul Poli; Jeffrey Jones; Bernard Freeman; Radric Davis	Poli Paul	4:20
13.	"Hood Boy" (featuring Sammie)	E. Stevens; Jacob Tupolo	Raw Smoov	4:09
14.	"Earl" (featuring Ice-T)	E. Stevens; Smith; Jackson	Lil Jon	4:18
15.	"Sliding Down the Pole" (featuring Too $hort)	William Hodge; E. Stevens; Todd Shaw; Devon Gazaway	Willy Will	3:24
16.	"I Can Sell It" (featuring Cousin Fik)	E. Stevens; E. Stevens, Jr.; Rafiki Sims	Droop-E	5:00
17.	"Big Time" (featuring Kevin Cossom)	E. Stevens; Kevin Cossom; Johnny Mollings; Lenny Mollings	DJ Nasty & LVM	4:03
18.	"Alcoholism" (featuring B-Legit)	E. Stevens; William Houseman; Eugene Crenshaw; Brandt Jones	DJ Fingaz "Fing Kong"; Virtuoso	3:41
19.	"Pray for Me" (featuring Bosko, Suga-T and B-Legit)	E. Stevens; Bosko Kante; Tenina Stevens	Bosko	4:57

Sample credits

- "The Ambassador" contains an excerpt from "9th Wonder"; written by Ishmael Butler, Craig Irving, and Mariana Viera; as performed by Digable Planets.

== Charts ==
=== Weekly charts ===
Chart (2008)	Peak position
US Billboard 200	42
US Top R&B/Hip-Hop Albums (Billboard)	6

=== Year-end charts ===
Chart (2009)	Position
US Top R&B/Hip-Hop Albums (Billboard)	75
