= Definition of Real =

Studio album by Plies
- Released: June 10, 2008
- Recorded: 2007–08
- Genres: Southern hip hop; dirty rap; gangsta rap
- Length: 58:49
- Labels: Big Gates; Slip-n-Slide; Atlantic
- Producers: Drumma Boy; Midnight Black; J. R. Rotem; DJ Nasty & LVM; Kane Beatz; DJ Frank E

Plies chronology
The Real Testament (2007)	Definition of Real (2008)	Da REAList (2008)

Singles from Definition of Real
- 1. "Bust It Baby Pt. 2" Released: February 23, 2008; 2. "Please Excuse My Hands" Released: July 13, 2008

Definition of Real is the second studio album by American rapper Plies. It was released on June 10, 2008, by Big Gates Records, Slip-n-Slide Records and Atlantic Records. Guest appearances include Ne-Yo, J. Holiday, Keyshia Cole, Trey Songz, Jamie Foxx and The-Dream. The album garnered mixed reviews from critics who questioned Plies' lyricism and vocal work. Definition of Real debuted at number 2 on the Billboard 200 and spawned two singles: "Bust It Baby Pt. 2" and "Please Excuse My Hands".

== Critical reception ==
Professional ratings
Aggregate scores
Source	Rating
Metacritic	59/100
Review scores
Source	Rating
AllMusic	3.5/5 stars
DJBooth	3/5 stars
HipHopDX	3/5 stars
IGN	8/10
MSN Music (Consumer Guide)	D+
RapReviews	7/10
UGO	D

Definition of Real received mixed reviews from music critics who questioned Plies' abilities as a capable rapper. At Metacritic, which assigns a normalized rating out of 100 to reviews from mainstream critics, the album received an average score of 59, based on 5 reviews.

Khalid Strickland of IGN gave high praise to the album's hyper-violent gangster material for displaying Plies' growth as a rapper, concluding that "Overall, with its bumping production and street sensibility, Definition of Real is a tight-knit piece of work that stiff-arms the dreaded "sophomore slump." Patrick Taylor of RapReviews said that despite being a transition to his next album and containing lightweight R&B hits that clashed with his thug image, he praised the album for delivering street tracks that were interlaced with introspection, concluding that "As it stands, Definition of Real may not be an instant classic, but it isn't a sophomore slump either, and there are signs that there could be more to Plies beyond his drawl and his love of female reproductive organs." AllMusic's David Jeffries also criticized the album's inclusion of radio songs but felt that Plies added more lyrical clarity to his goon bravado, saying that "The compelling three-quarters of Definition of Real that seems to have crawled out of the gutter proves that Plies is best off when he does it the ski-mask way."

Jon Caramanica of The New York Times praised Plies for maintaining his charisma when delivering both vindictive vulgarities and conscience sincerity despite the album not being as strong as The Real Testament, saying that it "lacks some of that album's rawness, but is still strong, thanks to his shockingly literal and unforgiving rhymes." Roman Cooper of HipHopDX felt the album's production had a cohesive sound but criticized Plies' inability to move past typical gangsta material and into more introspective tracks like "Somebody Loves You" and "1 Day", saying that "Seemingly incapable of switching up his flow or creating vivid imagery, it's important to realize that in listening to Definition of Real, you won't be getting Ready to Die." Nathan Slavik of DJBooth was mixed on the album, saying that he was put off by the expletive-laden lyrics heard throughout the hardcore tracks and love songs but that it would attract more to the female demographic. In MSN Music, Robert Christgau panned the album's overly violent and misogynistic content.

== Sales ==
Definition of Real debuted on the Billboard 200 at number two selling 214,902 copies in the first week of release, making it his second #2 album and highest first week sales, beating his debut album The Real Testament, which sold 96,000 in its first week. It was released on the same day as Lil Wayne's album Tha Carter III. It had the second best-selling sales for a hip hop album that year at the time of release behind Tha Carter III until it was surpassed by first week sales of The Game's album LAX and Jeezy's album The Recession later in the year . It was the fifth fast-selling hip hop album of 2008, until T.I.'s sixth studio album Paper Trail became the second in 2008, putting the album the sixth fastest selling hip hop album of 2008. In celebration of the album he renamed the date Goon 10th, instead of June 10 As of October 2008, the album has sold approximately 524,000 copies in the United States. It has become the rapper's second album to go gold and is his most successful sales of album to date.

== Singles ==
The first single is "Bust It Baby (Part. 2)" featuring Ne-Yo. It is currently his biggest hit single to date, peaking at number seven on the US Billboard Hot 100 chart. The second single is "Please Excuse My Hands" featuring Jamie Foxx, and The-Dream.

There is also a music video for the song "Who Hotter Than Me", released June 10, 2008.

== Track listing ==
Standard edition
No.	Title	Writer(s)	Producer(s)	Length
1.	"I'm Da Man" (featuring Trey Songz)	Plies; Christopher Gholson; Tremaine Neverson	Drumma Boy	3:49
2.	"Ol' Lady"	Plies; Brandon "Yung Necro Music" Crear; Ronell Levatte; Alexander Martin	NecronamBeatz	3:35
3.	"Bushes"	Plies; Tracey Sewell	Midnight Black	4:12
4.	"Worth Goin' FED Fo"	Plies; Bryan Tyson; Levatte; Martin	Bryan Tyson	3:59
5.	"Dat Bitch"	Plies; Daniel Valbrun; Joseph Valbrun; Levatte; Martin	DVS	3:33
6.	"Somebody (Loves You)"	Plies; Rodney Young; Eugene Curry; Walter Sigler	Rodnae	4:38
7.	"Feel Like Fuckin'"	Plies; Tyson; Levatte; Martin	Bryan Tyson	4:15
8.	"Watch Dis" (featuring Kevin Cossom)	Plies; Kevin Cossom; Gholson; Howard Coney; Dwight Watson; Benjamin Lakey; Aaron Bay-Schuck	Drumma Boy	3:29
9.	"Who Hotter Than Me?"	Plies; Sewell	Midnight Black	3:29
10.	"1 Day"	Plies; Tyson; Levatte; Martin	Bryan Tyson	3:51
11.	"Bust It Baby (Part 2)" (featuring Ne-Yo)	Plies; Jonathan Rotem; Shaffer Smith; Janet Jackson; James Harris; Terry Lewis	J.R. Rotem	4:01
12.	"Shit Bag"	Plies; Tyson; Levatte; Martin	Bryan Tyson	3:34
13.	"Please Excuse My Hands" (featuring The-Dream and Jamie Foxx)	Plies; The-Dream; Jamie Foxx; Justin Franks; Oliver Goldstein	DJ Frank E; Oligee (co.)	4:24
14.	"Rich Folk"	Plies; Kevin John; Elton John; Delvin Alexander; Marvin Alexander; Levatte; Martin	Pentagon Productions	4:03
15.	"#1 Fan" (featuring Keyshia Cole and J. Holiday)	Plies; Keyshia Cole; J. Holiday; Johnny Mollings; Lenny Mollings; Cossom	DJ Nasty & LVM	3:57

Best Buy Bonus Tracks
No.	Title	Writer(s)	Producer(s)	Length
16.	"Thug Section"	Plies; Daniel Johnson	Kane Beatz	4:50
17.	"Die Together"	Plies; Tyson; Levatte; Martin	Bryan Tyson	3:09
18.	"Bust It Baby (Part 1)"	Plies; D. Valbrun; J. Valbrun; Levatte; Martin	DVS	3:14

Sample Credits

- "Somebody (Loves You)" contains a sample of "Somebody Loves You Baby", written by Eugene Curry and Walter Sigler, as performed by Patti LaBelle.
- "Bust It Baby (Part 2)" contains a sample of "Come Back to Me", written by Janet Jackson, James Harris, and Terry Lewis, as performed by Janet Jackson.

== See also ==
2008 in hip hop

== Charts ==
=== Weekly charts ===
Chart (2008)	Peak position
US Billboard 200	2
US Top R&B/Hip-Hop Albums (Billboard)	2
US Top Rap Albums (Billboard)	2

=== Year-end charts ===
Chart (2008)	Position
US Billboard 200	76
US Top R&B/Hip-Hop Albums	13
US Top Rap Albums	6

== Certifications ==
Region	Certification	Certified units/sales
United States (RIAA)	Gold	500,000^{‡}
^{‡} Sales+streaming figures based on certification alone.
