= She Got It Made =

Single by Plies

from the album Goon Affiliated
- Released: March 5, 2010
- Recorded: 2010
- Genre: Hip hop; R&B
- Length: 3:27
- Label: Big Gates; Slip-n-Slide; Atlantic
- Songwriters: Algernod Washington; Brandon Green; Clinton Sparks
- Producers: Clinton Sparks; Kamau Georges

Plies singles chronology
"Put Your Hands Up" (2009)	"She Got It Made" (2010)	"Lose My Mind" (2010)

Bei Maejor singles chronology
"She Got It Made" (2010)	"Trouble" (2011)

Music video
- "She Got It Made" on YouTube

"She Got It Made" is the second single from Plies' fourth album, Goon Affiliated. The track has uncredited vocals by the American recording artist Maejor and was released onto the Internet on March 5, 2010. "She Got It Made" samples Rupert Holmes' hit song "Escape (The Piña Colada Song)".

== Charts ==
Chart (2010)	Peak Position
U.S. Billboard Bubbling Under Hot 100	3
U.S. Billboard Hot R&B/Hip-Hop Songs	30
U.S. Billboard Rap Songs	17
