= Ran Off on da Plug Twice =

Single by Plies

from the album Ain't No Mixtape Bih 2
- Released: January 29, 2016
- Recorded: 2015
- Genre: Hip hop; trap
- Length: 2:33
- Label: Big Gates; Slip-n-Slide; Atlantic
- Songwriters: Algernod Washington; Detorius Raheem Rivers
- Producer: DTSpacely

Plies singles chronology
"F**k Me" (2015)	"Ran Off on da Plug Twice" (2016)

"Ran Off On Da Plug Twice" (originally titled "Ritz Carlton") is a song by American hip hop recording artist Plies. It was released on January 29, 2016, by Big Gates Records, Slip-n-Slide Records and Atlantic Records, as a single from his mixtape Ain't No Mixtape Bih 2. This song was produced by DTSpacely.

== Music video ==
The song's accompanying music video originally premiered on November 19, 2015, on WorldStarHipHop's YouTube account and then moved to Plies's YouTube account with the name changed from Ritz Carlton to Ran Off on da Plug Twice due to the music video's viral popularity.

== Charts ==
Chart (2016)	Peak position
US Bubbling Under Hot 100 (Billboard)	17
US Hot R&B/Hip-Hop Songs (Billboard)	42
