= Hey Daddy (Daddy's Home) =

2009 single by Usher and Plies

Single by Usher featuring Plies

from the album Raymond v. Raymond
- Released: December 8, 2009
- Recorded: 2009
- Studio: Silent Sound Studios (Atlanta)
- Genre: R&B
- Length: 3:44 (original/album version); 4:16 (single/radio edit feat. Plies)
- Label: LaFace
- Songwriters: Rico Love; The Runners; Usher; Algernod Washington
- Producers: The Runners; Rico Love

Usher singles chronology
| "Fed Up" (2009) | "Hey Daddy (Daddy's Home)" (2009) | "Lil Freak" (2010) |

Plies singles chronology
| "Medicine" (2009) | "Hey Daddy (Daddy's Home)" (2009) | "Put Your Hands Up" (2010) |

Music video
- "Hey Daddy (Daddy's Home)" on YouTube

"Hey Daddy (Daddy's Home)" is a song by American singer Usher. It was written by longtime Usher collaborator Rico Love, Usher, Plies as well as Andrew Harr and Jermaine Jackson from production duo The Runners for his sixth studio album Raymond v. Raymond (2010), while production was helmed by Love, Harr, and Jackson. "Hey Daddy (Daddy's Home)" was released as the album's first single in the United States, following the buzz single "Papers". It peaked at number twenty-four on the Billboard Hot 100, and at number two on the Hot R&B/Hip-Hop Songs.

The song was released as the album's first single in the United States, following the buzz single "Papers". A remix version of the song, featuring Plies, was released to radio stations on December 8, 2009, and subsequently made available for digital download on December 15, 2009. A second remix was released, featuring Jadakiss, on February 5, 2010 with a different beat that samples the 1997 hit by Lord Tariq and Peter Gunz, "Deja Vu (Uptown Baby)" (which in turn samples Steely Dan's "Black Cow").

== Background and composition ==
The song was leaked onto the internet in later October 2009 with several preliminary tracks from Raymond v. Raymond. "Hey Daddy (Daddy's Home)", one of the tracks that follows-up Usher's divorce, and the change in content from Here I Stand, back to Confessions-style, was one of six tracks co-written by Rico Love for the album. In an exclusive with Rap-Up, Love said of Usher's return to that style, "I feel like he’s got his mind right and it’s focused. He went through a lot. He had lost his father when he was creating the Here I Stand record, a lot of controversy with his marriage, he had kids, he parted ways with his mother’s management, and there were just a lot of things going on and he kind of lost focus. It’s not like Here I Stand wasn’t a good album. I just feel like he lost touch with his demographic." According to MTV News, the song provides the reasons behind Usher's crumbling marriage as narrated in "Papers". The remix version featuring Plies made its way onto the internet in late November, a few days before the song's radio and digital release.

== Critical reception ==
"Hey Daddy (Daddy's Home)"
A 30-second sample of "Hey Daddy" featuring the chorus by Usher

Mariel Concepcion of Billboard said that the song is "a clear indication that the R&B crooner is bringing sexy back," "atop a silky piano pattern and hand claps." She also said, "Plies makes a nice addition to the already sexified track, as the self-proclaimed goon drops a raunchy verse in his raspy Southern drawl." The review went on to say, "'Hey Daddy' may not be a chart-topper-yet-but it sure will make the naysayers pay attention again." Mark Edward Nero of About.com said that the song was "is not only the album's first official single," but "also a declaration." He goes on to say, "In the song, Usher's basically sending a message to his female fans that the Usher they knew and loved is back in their lives and that they don't need to stray any more: "You know your daddy's home, and it's time to play, so you ain't got to give my lovin' away." Nero calls 'Hey Daddy' "one of more than half a dozen sex songs on the album." Sara D. Anderson of AOL Music said that the song has a "catchy R&B tune" and "the song showcases Usher's role as the ladies' man as he croons: "You know your daddy's home (daddy's home) / And it's time to play (so it's time to play) / So you ain't got to give my loving away." James Reed of The Boston Globe said that the track was one of the album's songs to showcase "Usher's signature loveman moves" however called them "hollow as a chocolate Easter bunny", as he pointed out the whole album had a lack of emotion Andrew Rennie of Now Magazine said that on the song and on "Lil Freak" that Usher shows "he’s unafraid to get lewd".

== Chart performance ==
After its release to digital download, the song debuted at number ninety-four on the Billboard Hot 100. The song fell off the chart its second week, but re-entered the chart four weeks later at number 100. It then dropped out the chart again, before re-entering yet again, this time at eighty. It has since peaked at twenty-four. The song peaked at number two on the Hot R&B/Hip-Hop Songs chart, and was Usher's third consecutive top five R&B hit, and his fourteenth top three R&B title. With the charting, Usher passed Ludacris for the most top three hits. The song also peaked at number sixty-eight on the Austrian Singles Chart.

== Music video ==
Usher doing choreography in a studio with dancers and in front of a backdrop with Lenoir

The music video was directed by Chris Robinson, and was shot in West Hollywood at "The London". It premiered on MTV on January 28, 2010. French fashion model Noémie Lenoir portrays Usher's love interest. Like the album version of the song, the music video does not feature Plies or his verse. In the video, Usher struggles to get home to his wife, however due to several obligations and his partying, he cannot make it. Previous shots are given of Usher and Lenoir in a brown backdrop, and assumed previous situations of their love life and Usher coming home. Scenes are seen with Usher in a boardroom setting, and then teaching dance to a group of women in a studio, then in a club. Several instances in the video are unknown as in the scene in which Usher takes a phone call, unknown to the viewer for "business or pleasure," as explained by James Montgomery of MTV News. In describing the video, he went on to say, "...you can kind of see why it'd be about both. Such is the life he's chosen, and now he must deal with the repercussions." In following scenes the threat of infidelity is seen even clearer as Usher gets close to the "over-friendly dancers" and "sipping — and spitting — champagne in a place that looks very much like a strip club."

Montgomery went on to say that the video is full of "temptation, love and lust," and "about distance and the effect it has on all those things." He goes on to say that in the video "All Ush wants to do is make it back to her, to do all those things that husbands and wives tend to do. The only problem is he can't." At the end of the video, Lenoir has enough, and walks out. Montgomery notes that it is not clear whether Usher even makes it home, or if the song was even referring to the wife character, and not "someone special stashed in a nearby suite." In resolving the video's review, Montgomery said, "Distance may make the heart grow fonder, but there are limits to everything. Usher may want to be no place but home, but there's a big, wide world out there with pitfalls aplenty. He's a superstar, a businessman, a father and an (ex-) husband, but at the end of the day, Ush is also human, and "Hey Daddy" is proof of that." In a review of the video, Rap-Up said that "Even though it’s been a minute since his last video, the ladies man still knows how to bust a move."

The music video on YouTube has received over 266 million views as of September 2026.

== Live performances ==
Usher performed the song on Lopez Tonight and the Late Show with David Letterman. In promoting Raymond v. Raymond, he performed the song along with a medley of the songs from the album on Good Morning America.

== Credits and personnel ==
Credits adapted from the album's liner notes.

- Songwriting – Usher Raymond, Rico Love, Andrew Harr, Jermaine Jackson, Plies
- Production – Rico Love, Andrew Harr, Jermaine Jackson
- Background vocals – Rico Love, Tocarra Hamilton
- Vocal production – Rico Love
- Vocal recording – Ian Cross
- Mixing – Manny Marroquin, assisted by Erik Madrid

== Charts ==
=== Weekly charts ===
2010 weekly chart performance for "Hey Daddy (Daddy's Home)"
| Chart (2010) | Peak position |
|---|---|
| Austria (Ö3 Austria Top 40) | 68 |
| US Billboard Hot 100 | 24 |
| US Hot R&B/Hip-Hop Songs (Billboard) | 2 |
| US Rhythmic Airplay (Billboard) | 7 |

=== Year-end charts ===
Year-end chart performance for "Hey Daddy (Daddy's Home)"
| Chart (2010) | Peak position |
|---|---|
| US Billboard Hot 100 | 82 |
| US Hot R&B/Hip-Hop Songs (Billboard) | 7 |

== Certifications ==
Certifications and sales for "Hey Daddy (Daddy's Home)"
| Region | Certification | Certified units/sales |
|---|---|---|
| New Zealand (RMNZ) | 2× Platinum | 60,000^{‡} |
| South Korea | — | 187,053 |
| United Kingdom (BPI) | Silver | 200,000^{‡} |
| United States (RIAA) | 2× Platinum | 2,000,000^{‡} |
^{‡} Sales+streaming figures based on certification alone.

== Release history ==
Release history and formats for "Hey Daddy"
| Region | Date | Format(s) | Ref. |
|---|---|---|---|
| United States | December 8, 2009 | Digital download | |
| United States | December 8, 2009 | Urban and rhythmic airplay | |
| United Kingdom | March 20, 2011 | CD single; digital download | |
