= I'm So Hood =

2007 single by DJ Khaled featuring T-Pain, Trick Daddy, Rick Ross and Plies

Single by DJ Khaled featuring T-Pain, Trick Daddy, Rick Ross and Plies

from the album We the Best
- Released: August 28, 2007
- Recorded: 2006
- Length: 4:17
- Label: Terror Squad; Koch
- Songwriters: Andrew Harr; Algernod Washington; Faheem Najm; Jermaine Jackson; Khaled Khaled; Maurice Young; William Roberts II
- Producer: The Runners

DJ Khaled singles chronology
"We Takin' Over" (2007)	"I'm So Hood" (2007)	"I'm So Hood (Remix)" (2007)

T-Pain singles chronology
"Baby Don't Go" (2007)	"I'm So Hood" (2007)	"Kiss Kiss" (2007)

Trick Daddy singles chronology
"Bet That" (2007)	"I'm So Hood" (2007)	"Tuck Ya Ice" (2007)

Rick Ross singles chronology
"We Takin' Over" (2007)	"I'm So Hood" (2007)	"Get That Bread" (2007)

Plies singles chronology
"Shawty" (2007)	"I'm So Hood" (2007)	"Hypnotized" (2007)

"I'm So Hood" is a song by American musician DJ Khaled featuring American rappers T-Pain, Trick Daddy, Rick Ross, and Plies, released as the second single from the former's second studio album We the Best (2007). "I'm So Hood" is one of Khaled's best-known songs.

== Music video ==
The video was shot in Liberty City, Miami, Florida. It features cameo appearances from Birdman, Busta Rhymes, Trina, Fat Joe, Pitbull and Triple C's.

== Remixes ==
"I'm So Hood (Remix)"

Single by DJ Khaled featuring Young Jeezy, Ludacris, Busta Rhymes, Big Boi, Lil Wayne, Fat Joe, Birdman, Rick Ross & T-Pain

from the album We the Best
- Released: October 30, 2007
- Recorded: 2007
- Genre: Gangsta rap
- Length: 5:43
- Label: Terror Squad, Koch
- Songwriters: Khaled Bin Abdul Khaled, Faheem Rasheed Najm, Jay Jenkins, Christopher Brian Bridges, Trevor Tahiem Smith, Jr., Antwan André Patton, Dwayne Carter Jr., Joseph Cartagena, Bryan Williams, William Leonard Roberts II
- Producer: The Runners

DJ Khaled singles chronology
"I'm So Hood" (2007)	"I'm So Hood (Remix)" (2007)	"100 Million" (2007)

Young Jeezy singles chronology
"5000 Ones" (2007)	"I'm So Hood (Remix)" (2007)	"100 Million" (2007)

Ludacris singles chronology
"Rock Star" (2007)	"I'm So Hood (Remix)" (2007)	"Down In Tha Dirty" (2007)

Busta Rhymes singles chronology
"Hurt" (2007)	"I'm So Hood (Remix)" (2007)	"Run the Show" (2008)

Big Boi singles chronology
"Hood Boy" (2006)	"I'm So Hood (Remix)" (2007)	"Royal Flush" (2008)

Lil Wayne singles chronology
"Sweetest Girl (Dollar Bill)" (2007)	"I'm So Hood (Remix)" (2007)	"100 Million" (2007)

Fat Joe singles chronology
"We Takin' Over" (2007)	"I'm So Hood (Remix)" (2007)	"I Won't Tell" (2007)

Birdman singles chronology
"Pop Bottles" (2007)	"I'm So Hood (Remix)" (2007)	"100 Million" (2007)

Rick Ross singles chronology
"Speedin'" (2007)	"I'm So Hood (Remix)" (2007)	"Down In Tha Dirty" (2007)

The official remix of "I'm So Hood" features hip-hop rappers Young Jeezy, Ludacris, Busta Rhymes, Big Boi, Lil Wayne, Fat Joe, Birdman and a new verse from Rick Ross. At the 2008 BET Hip Hop Awards, the official remix won the award for best collaboration.

An alternate remix is a rock remix featuring guitar work performed by Jamey Jasta of metal/hardcore band Hatebreed.

Cuban Link remixed the song and released it as a diss track towards Khaled, Fat Joe, and Rick Ross and it was titled "Your Not Hood". It was featured on his group Bang Bang Boogie's mixtape The Machine, Vol. 1.

ByrdGang made a remix entitled "I'm So Hood (Byrd Gang Remix)" that can be found on the Members Of Byrdgang 2 (M.O.B) mixtape.

British rapper Kano has made a freestyle to the song on his MC No. 1 mixtape.

The music video of the remix features cameos from Webbie, Lil Phat, Boosie, Foxx, Shell, Mouse, DJ Drama, Don Cannon, DJ Sense, Willie the Kid, DJ Q45, Gorilla Zoe, Yung Joc, Yung Berg, Swizz Beatz, Plies, Juelz Santana, Jim Jones, Project Pat, Yo Gotti, Blood Raw, Slick Pulla, Roccett, E-40, and Slim Thug, among others.

== Charts ==
=== Weekly charts ===
Chart (2007)	Peak position
US Billboard Hot 100	19
US Hot R&B/Hip-Hop Songs (Billboard)	9
US Hot Rap Songs (Billboard)	5
US Pop 100 (Billboard)	33
US Rhythmic Airplay (Billboard)	26

=== Year-end charts ===
Chart (2007)	Position
US Hot R&B/Hip-Hop Songs (Billboard)	86
Chart (2008)	Position
US Hot R&B/Hip-Hop Songs (Billboard)	53

== Certifications ==
Region	Certification	Certified units/sales
United States (RIAA)	Gold	500,000^{^}
United States (RIAA) Mastertone	Platinum	1,000,000^{*}
^{*} Sales figures based on certification alone.^{^} Shipments figures based on certification alone.
