= Put It on Ya =

Single by Plies featuring Chris J

from the album Da REAList
- Released: October 7, 2008
- Recorded: 2008
- Genre: Hip hop
- Length: 3:50
- Label: Big Gates, Slip-n-Slide, Atlantic
- Songwriters: Algernod W., Timothy Thomas, Theron Thomas, D. Wilson
- Producer: No I.D.

Plies singles chronology
"Hi Hater Remix" (2008)	"Put It on Ya" (2008)	"Want It, Need It" (2009)

"Put It on Ya" is a song performed by American hip hop artist; Plies. The song features newcoming R&B artist Chris J, and is produced by No I.D., and was co-written by Kon Live recording duo, Rock City (group) . It is the first official single from Plies' third studio album Da REAList.

== Background ==
The promo version of "Put It on Ya" was released to the Internet on October 7, 2008. The album version was premiered with the video via his MySpace page over a month prior on November 12, 2008. The video was also featured on BET's Access Granted. After the album's release the song entered the iTunes top 100 at #29.

== Chart performance ==
"Put It On Ya" debuted at #92 on the Billboard Hot 100 and had been rising up the chart each week. On the issue of January 3, 2009, it rose from #65 to #31, after the album Da REAList was released.

== Charts ==
=== Weekly charts ===
Chart (2008–2009)	Peak position
US Billboard Hot 100	31
US Hot R&B/Hip-Hop Songs (Billboard)	8
US Rhythmic Airplay (Billboard)	15

=== Year-end charts ===
Chart (2009)	Position
US Hot R&B/Hip-Hop Songs (Billboard)	62
