= Please Excuse My Hands =

Single by Plies featuring The-Dream & Jamie Foxx

from the album Definition of Real
- Released: June 13, 2008
- Recorded: 2008
- Genre: Hip hop
- Length: 4:26 (album version); 4:09 (radio edit)
- Label: Big Gates; Slip-n-Slide; Atlantic
- Songwriters: Algernod Washington; Lincoln Browder; Justin Franks; Oliver Goldstein; Darrell "Delite" Allamby
- Producers: DJ Frank E; Oligee

Plies singles chronology
| "Out Here Grindin" (2008) | "Please Excuse My Hands" (2008) | "Year of the Lover" (2008) |

The-Dream singles chronology
| "I Luv Your Girl" (2008) | "Please Excuse My Hands" (2008) | "Baby" (2008) |

Jamie Foxx singles chronology
| "Can I Take U Home" (2006) | "Please Excuse My Hands" (2008) | "Just Like Me" (2008) |

"Please Excuse My Hands" is the second single from Plies's second album, Definition of Real. It features Jamie Foxx and The-Dream.

== Music video ==
The video was released on July 23, 2008. It premiered as the "New Joint of the Day" on BET's 106 & Park. The video can now be seen on MySpace and YouTube. The video is about a man expressing how when he is alone with his lover, his hands have a mind of their own, and he does not intend disrespect to her.

== Charts ==
=== Weekly charts ===
| Chart (2008) | Peak position |
|---|---|
| US Billboard Hot 100 | 66 |
| US Hot R&B/Hip-Hop Songs (Billboard) | 8 |
| US Hot Rap Songs (Billboard) | 9 |
| US Rhythmic Airplay (Billboard) | 29 |

=== Year-end charts ===
| Chart (2008) | Position |
|---|---|
| US Hot R&B/Hip-Hop Songs (Billboard) | 57 |
