= Bust It Baby =

2008 single by Plies

"Bust It Baby (Part 2)"

Single by Plies featuring Ne-Yo

from the album Definition of Real
- Released: January 25, 2008 (Part 1); February 23, 2008 (Part 2)
- Recorded: 2007
- Genre: Hip hop; pop-rap; R&B
- Length: 4:00
- Label: Big Gates; Slip-n-Slide; Atlantic
- Songwriters: Algernod Washington; Shaffer Smith; J.R. Rotem; Terry Lewis, James Harris; Janet Jackson
- Producer: J.R. Rotem

Plies singles chronology
"Hypnotized" (2008)	"Bust It Baby (Part 2)" (2008)	"Ain't Sayin' Nothin'" (2008)

Ne-Yo singles chronology
"Go On Girl" (2008)	"Bust It Baby Pt. 2" (2008)	"Finer Things" (2008)

"Bust It Baby" is a single by American rapper Plies released on January 25, 2008, and is the first single from Plies' second album, Definition of Real. The original was featured as a bonus track on Definition of Real, while "Bust It Baby (Part 2)", which features R&B singer Ne-Yo, is an official track on the album.

The song features a noticeable sample of Janet Jackson's 1990 single "Come Back to Me", a #2 hit from her 1989 album Janet Jackson's Rhythm Nation 1814. Jackson is also featured on the song's official remix.

== Bust It Baby (Part 2) ==
"Bust It Baby (Part 2)" is the second part of the two single release of "Bust It Baby", making it the first "double single." On the R&B/Hip Hop chart, "Bust It Baby (Part 2)" peaked at #2, surpassing the original. It is Plies' second top 10 hit on the Billboard Hot 100, and his biggest hit on the chart to date, peaking at #7. This surpassed the #9 peak of "Shawty" in 2007, and tying for Slip-n-Slide Records' highest placement on the Hot 100 (the other SNS single to reach that peak was Trick Daddy's 2004 single "Let's Go" featuring Lil Jon and Twista). In New Zealand, the song jumped from #22 to #9 in its second week on the chart.

== Music video ==
The music video directed by Plies himself debuted on BET's Rap City on April 28, 2008. DJ Khaled, Rick Ross, and Ace Hood made cameos. It debuted on 106 & Park on May 1, 2008. "Bust It Baby (Part 2)" has had multiple number ones on 106 & Park. It stayed on the countdown for 35 days.

== Charts ==
=== Weekly charts ===
Chart (2008)	Peak position
Japan Hot 100 (Billboard)	79
New Zealand (Recorded Music NZ)	9
UK Singles (OCC)	81
US Billboard Hot 100	7
US Hot R&B/Hip-Hop Songs (Billboard)	2
US Pop Airplay (Billboard)	18
US Hot Rap Songs (Billboard)	2
US Rhythmic Airplay (Billboard)	2

=== Year-end charts ===
Chart (2008)	Position
US Billboard Hot 100	38
US Hot R&B/Hip-Hop Songs (Billboard)	16
US Rhythmic (Billboard)	8

== Certifications ==
Certifications for "Bust It Baby Part 2"
Region	Certification	Certified units/sales
New Zealand (RMNZ)	Platinum	30,000^{‡}
United States (RIAA)	Platinum	1,000,000^{‡}
United States (RIAA) Mastertone	Gold	500,000^{*}
^{*} Sales figures based on certification alone.^{‡} Sales+streaming figures based on certification alone.

== Radio and release history ==
Country	Date	Format	Label
Ireland	March 18, 2008	Digital download	Atlantic
United Kingdom	March 18, 2008	Digital download	Atlantic
United States	April 29, 2008	Rhythmic contemporary radio	Slip-n-Side; Atlantic
United States	April 29, 2008	Urban contemporary radio	Slip-n-Side; Atlantic
United States	May 6, 2008	Vinyl single	Slip-n-Side; Atlantic
United States	May 13, 2008	Contemporary hit radio	Slip-n-Side; Atlantic
