= J. R. Rotem =

American record producer

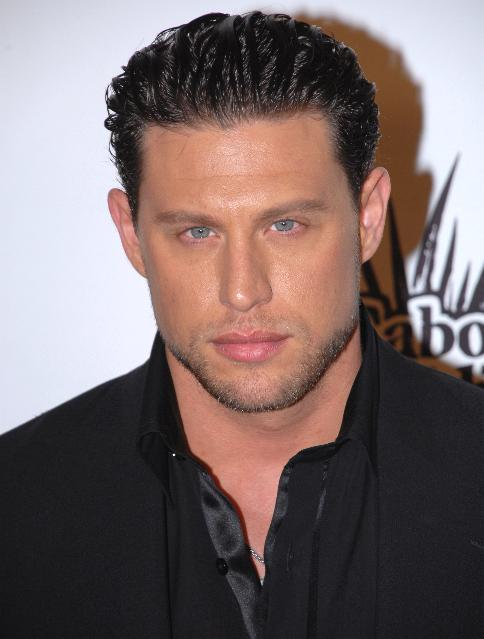
- Rotem in 2007 at Hollywood Life Magazine's 7th Annual Breakthrough Awards

Background information
- Born: Jonathan Reuven Rotem; September 1, 1975 (age 51); Johannesburg, South Africa
- Origin: Moraga, California, U.S.
- Education: Berklee College of Music (BM)
- Genres: Pop; hip hop; R&B; reggae fusion
- Occupations: Record producer; songwriter; music publisher
- Years active: 2000–present
- Labels: Net Worth Entertainment; Beluga Heights; Warner
- Website: belugaheights.com/jr

Jonathan Reuven Rotem (born September 1, 1975) is a South African-born American record producer, songwriter and music publisher.

== Biography ==
=== Early life ===
Rotem was born on July 23, 1975 in Johannesburg, South Africa to Jewish Israeli immigrant parents. He moved to Canada at the age of two, and to Moraga, California at twelve.

Rotem played piano as a child. He attended Berklee College of Music with the intention of studying scoring for film, but instead majored in jazz composition.

=== Career ===
As his first major label placement, Destiny's Child song "Fancy", from their 2001 album Survivor, is cited by Rotem as being his first 'big break', and the song that convinced the young producer that it was worth pursuing this career path. Nevertheless, further success was not forthcoming and for years Rotem struggled to make further headway in the industry.

A significant breakthrough came when, through mutual friend Evan Bogart, he attracted the attention of former manager Zach Katz, a former music attorney who had recently represented rapper Rakim as well as music producers and songwriters in the Aftermath/Shady/G-Unit camp. Rotem says, "One of my biggest goals for years was meeting a manager with a good reputation and with connections to get my music to people."

Rotem's next major cut was 50 Cent's "Position of Power" in 2005. In 2006, together with Katz and his brother Tommy, Rotem started his own record label, Beluga Heights, inking a joint venture partnership with Epic. Sean Kingston, a young Miami-based Caribbean artist, was the labels first signing. Kingston's self-titled debut album went on to sell over 2 million albums and 10 million singles worldwide. Rotem also started a publishing company under the Beluga Heights banner, signing songwriter Evan "Kidd" Bogart. Under a newly formed joint venture with Warner Bros. Records, the label signed R&B sensation Jason Derulo, whose debut album went on to sell 14 million singles and over 1 million albums worldwide.

In 2009, Rotem was honored as BMI Producer of the Year. In 2011, he was return to honored by BMI as Songwriter of the Year along with Lady Gaga and Jason Derulo. His producer tag is a horn that sounds with a stylized "J-J-J-J-J-R" and/or "Beluga Heights" at the beginning or end of records he produced.

In 2015, Rotem worked along with Ne-Yo and Timbaland on the music for the second season of Fox's Empire. On October 17, 2015, Gwen Stefani released "Used to Love You", co-written and produced by Rotem at the Hammerstein Ballroom in New York City which was Stefani's first single. Rotem has ten songs on Stefani's album, This Is What the Truth Feels Like which was released on March 18, 2016.

== Discography ==
=== Songs and singles produced by J. R. Rotem ===
Year	Artist	Song	Chart position			
Year	Artist	Song	US	UK	GER	AUS
2006	Rihanna	"SOS"	1	2	2	1
2006	Lil' Kim	"Whoa"	104	43	–	–
2006	Rick Ross	"Push It"	57	–	–	–
2006	Paris Hilton	"I Want You"	–	–	–	–
2006	Sean Kingston	"Beautiful Girls"	1	1	10	1
2006	Sean Kingston	"Me Love"	14	32	48	11
2006	Sean Kingston	"Take You There"	7	47	–	34
2006	Ashley Tisdale	"He Said She Said"	58	155	17	–
2006	JoJo	"The High Road"	–	–	–	–
2006	Kevin Federline	"America's Most Hated"	–	–	–	–
2007	Chamillionaire feat. Slick Rick	"Hip Hop Police"	101	50	–	–
2007	The Cheetah Girls	"Fuego"	122	–	–	–
2007	Britney Spears	"Everybody"	–	–	–	–
2007	Lil Scrappy	"Livin' in the Projects"	–	–	–	–
2007	Jada feat. Sean Kingston	"I'm that Chick"	–	–	–	–
2007	Nicole Scherzinger feat. will.i.am	"Baby Love (Remix)"	108	14	5	58
2007	Baby Bash feat. Sean Kingston	"What Is It"	57	–	–	–
2007	Plies	"1 Mo Time"	–	–	–	–
2007	Plies	"I Am the Club"	–	–	–	–
2007	Fabolous	"Can You Hear Me"	–	–	–	–
2007	Mýa feat. Snoop Dogg	"Walka Not a Talka"	–	–	–	–
2008	The D.E.Y.	"Give You the World"	119	–	–	–
2008	Rick Ross feat. T-Pain	"The Boss"	17	–	–	–
2008	Flo Rida feat. Sean Kingston	"Roll"	59	–	–	–
2008	Plies feat. Ne-Yo	"Bust It Baby Pt. 2"	7	93	–	–
2008	Bun B feat. Sean Kingston	"That's Gangsta"	122	–	–	–
2008	Gorilla Zoe feat. Sean Kingston	"On The Corner"	–	–	–	–
2008	Mann feat. Sean Kingston	"Ghetto Girl"	–	–	–	–
2008	Leona Lewis	"Better in Time"	11	2	2	6
2008	Vanessa Hudgens	"Sneakernight"	88	164	98	94
2008	Jesse McCartney	"My Baby"	–	–	–	–
2008	James Fauntleroy	"Strength"	–	–	–	–
2008	E-40 feat. The Game & Snoop Dogg	"Pain No More"	111	–	–	–
2008	Cory Gunz feat. Jason Derulo	"Gamble on Me"	125	–	–	–
2008	Plies feat. Ashanti	"Want It, Need It"	96	–	–	–
2008	Mike Jones feat. Nae Nae	"Next to You"	63	–	–	–
2009	Anastacia	"Defeated"	–	–	–	–
2009	Maino	"However Do U Want It"	124	–	–	–
2009	Piles	"Becky"	104	–	–	–
2009	Iyaz	"Replay"	2	1	7	1
2009	Iyaz	"Solo"	32	3	25	48
2009	Iyaz	"So Big"	–	40	–	–
2009	Mann feat. Jason Derulo	"Text"	–	–	–	–
2009	Tynisha Keli	"Lights Out"	–	–	–	–
2009	Auburn	"Superman"	–	–	–	–
2009	Sean Kingston feat. Lil Wayne	"I'm at War"	–	–	–	–
2010	Dima Bilan	"Changes"	–	–	–	–
2010	Jason Derulo	"Whatcha Say"	1	3	7	5
2010	Jason Derulo	"In My Head"	5	1	9	1
2010	Jason Derulo	"Ridin' Solo"	9	2	24	4
2010	Jason Derulo	"What If"	76	12	–	32
2010	Jason Derulo	"The Sky's the Limit"	–	68	–	22
2010	JLS	"Everybody in Love"	–	1	–	–
2010	Lindsay Lohan	"Too Young To Die"	–	–	–	–
2010	The Ready Set	"Love Like Woe"	27	–	–	–
2010	B.o.B feat. T.I.	"Not Lost"	–	–	–	–
2010	Sean Kingston	"Secret"	–	–	–	–
2010	Sean Kingston	"She Moves"	–	–	–	–
2010	Auburn feat. Iyaz	"La La La"	51	–	–	–
2010	Romance on a Rocketship	"Skin & Bones"	–	–	–	–
2010	Sarah Connor	"Fall Apart"	–	–	–	–
2010	Fefe Dobson	"Stuttering"	–	–	–	–
2010	Ilya	"Preapproved"	–	–	–	–
2010	Cheryl Cole	"Better to Lie"	–	–	–	–
2011	Kat Graham	"I Want It All"	–	–	–	–
2011	Mann feat. 50 Cent	"Buzzin'"	73	6	–	–
2011	Nicki Minaj feat. Rihanna	"Fly"	19	16	–	18
2011	Nicki Minaj	"Girls Fall Like Dominoes'"	–	24	–	99
2011	Mann feat. Snoop Dogg and Iyaz	"The Mack"	–	28	–	68
2011	Iyaz feat. Travie McCoy	"Pretty Girls"	43	–	–	–
2011	Cover Drive	"Lick Ya Down"	–	9	–	–
2011	Big Time Rush	"Invisible"	–	–	–	–
2011	Jason Derulo	"Pick Up the Pieces"	–	–	–	37
2011	Jason Derulo	"Dumb"	–	–	–	–
2011	Jason Derulo	"Be Careful"	–	–	–	–
2012	Mann feat. T-Pain	"Get It Girl"	–	–	–	–
2012	Chris Rene	"Young Homie"	101	–	–	–
2012	Nicki Minaj	"Marilyn Monroe"	104	121	–	–
2012	Machine Gun Kelly feat. Cassie	"Warning Shot"	–	–	–	–
2012	Maroon 5	"Wipe Your Eyes"	80	–	–	–
2013	Jessica Sanchez	"Don't Come Around"	–	–	–	–
2013	Sean Kingston feat. T.I.	"Back 2 Life (Live It Up)"	109	–	70	–
2013	Sean Kingston	"Bomba"	–	–	–	–
2013	Sean Kingston	"Ordinary Girl"	–	–	–	–
2013	Sean Kingston feat. Busta Rhymes	"How We Survive"	–	–	–	–
2014	Mike Jay feat. YG & Too $hort	"For a Week"	–	–	–	–
2014	Fall Out Boy	"Centuries"	10	22	71	55
2015	Meghan Trainor	"No Good for You"	–	–	–	–
2015	Fifth Harmony	"Like Mariah"	–	–	–	–
2015	Empire	"Born to Love U"	–	–	–	–
2015	Empire	"Do It"	–	–	–	–
2015	Empire	"Mimosa"	–	–	–	–
2015	Empire	"Runnin"	–	–	–	–
2015	Empire	"Powerful" (feat. Jussie Smollett and Alicia Keys)	–	–	–	–
2015	Empire	"Miracles"	–	–	–	–
2015	Gwen Stefani	"Used to Love You"	52	157	–	57
2015	Who Is Fancy feat. Ariana Grande & Meghan Trainor	"Boys Like You"	118	–	–	–
2016	Panic! at the Disco	"Don't Threaten Me with a Good Time"	–	–	–	–
2016	Empire	"Crown"	–	–	–	–
2016	Empire	"Freedom"	–	–	–	–
2016	Rick Ross feat. Mariah Carey	"Can't Say No"	–	–	–	–
2016	Charlie Puth	"Dangerously"	–	–	–	–
2016	Gwen Stefani	"Naughty"	–	–	–	–
2016	Gwen Stefani	"Red Flag"	–	–	–	–
2016	Gwen Stefani	"Getting Warmer"	–	–	–	–
2016	Gwen Stefani	"Rocketship"	–	–	–	–
2016	Gwen Stefani	"War Paint"	–	–	–	–
2016	Gwen Stefani	"Me Without You"	–	–	–	–
2016	Gwen Stefani	"Splash"	–	–	–	–
2016	Gwen Stefani	"Obsessed"	–	–	–	–
2016	Gwen Stefani	"Loveable"	–	–	–	–
2017	Linkin Park	"Talking to Myself"	109	–	73	–
2017	Marteen	"Sriracha"	–	–	–	–
2017	Weezer	"Feels Like Summer"	–	–	–	–
2018	Ciara	"Level Up"	59	–	–	–
2019	Dinah Jane	"Heard It All Before"	–	–	–	–
2019	Avril Lavigne	"Birdie", "Bright" (Currently Unreleased)	–	–	–	–
2019	Chris Brown feat. Nicki Minaj & G-Eazy	"Wobble Up"	103	–	–	–
2020	Bad Bunny	"En Casita"	–	–	–	–
2020	Netta	"Cuckoo"	–	–	–	–
2021	OMB Peezy	"Right Here"	–	–	–	–
2021	Enrique Iglesias feat. Pitbull	"Move to Miami"	–	–	–	–
2022	Subliminal	"Yeye"	–	–	–	–
2024	Akon	"Akon's Beautiful Day"	–	–	–	–
