= The Real Testament =

Studio album by Plies
- Released: August 7, 2007
- Recorded: 2006–2007
- Genre: Southern hip hop; dirty rap; gangsta rap
- Length: 57:36
- Label: Big Gates; Slip-n-Slide; Atlantic
- Producer: Kane Beatz; Akon; DJ Nasty & LVM; Drumma Boy; DVS; Ensayne; Gold Ru$h; Hen & Ro; Jay E; J. R. Rotem; Midnight Black; Papa Duck; The Beat Eaters

Plies chronology
The Real Testament (2007)	Definition of Real (2008)

Singles from The Real Testament
- 1. "Shawty" Released: July 10, 2007; 2. "Hypnotized" Released: September 11, 2007

The Real Testament is the debut studio album by American rapper Plies. It was released on August 7, 2007, by Big Gates Records, Slip-n-Slide Records and Atlantic Records. Upon its release, the album was well received by music critics.

On January 31, 2020, Plies released a sequel mixtape, The Real Testament II.

== History ==
The album features guest appearances by Akon, Tank, and T-Pain. The first single "Shawty", released on July 10, 2007, features T-Pain and was produced by Drumma Boy and Ensayne.

The second single "Hypnotized" features and was produced by Akon.

There was also a series of web-only singles "100 Years", "Running My Momma Crazy", and "Got Em Hatin", there is a video for each of them, most of them were released in October and November, 2007. The third single was scheduled to be "You", featuring Tank, but it was changed to "I Am the Club".

The album was released in five different versions which included different bonus features depending on where the buyer purchases the album from.

The album was originally titled The Real Nigga Bible but was changed to The Real Testament for business reasons. The original cover showed Plies with a cigar filled with marijuana in his mouth, but was edited for certain retail outlets. An instrumental version of the album was released on iTunes on September 25.

== Critical reception ==
Professional ratings
Review scores
Source	Rating
AllMusic	3.5/5 stars
DJBooth	3/5 stars
RapReviews	7/10 stars

AllMusic editor David Jeffries said that the album had a few "redundant tracks and some potential unreached", but praised both studio and street tracks being supported by capable producers and guest artists throughout. He concluding with: "An energetic artist with little refinement, Plies puts his rough edges to good use on The Real Testament, an exciting, sometimes promising, debut." Steve 'Flash' Juon of RapReviews spoke about the record: "In lesser hands this would have been one of a hundred no-name rap albums that end up in your local store's bargain bin but thanks to good beats and well-chosen singles in The Real Testament, Plies makes a favorable impression both on radio and his CD. So long as he avoids any more unfortunate nightclub incidents Plies has a promising future ahead that doesn't involve '100 Years' behind bars."

== Chart performance ==
The Real Testament sold 96,000 copies in its first week of release, debuting at number two on the Billboard 200. The following week the album dropped seven spots to number nine. In its third week, the album sold 27,000 copies, dropping from number nine to twenty one. As of April 8, 2019, The Real Testament has been certified Platinum by the Recording Industry Association of America.

== Track listing ==
No.	Title	Writer(s)	Producer(s)	Length
1.	"The Real Testament" (Intro)	Plies; George Wegans; Ronell Levatte; Alexander Martin	Papa Duck	2:09
2.	"100 Years"	Plies; Tracey Sewell	Midnight Black	3:50
3.	"I Know U Workin'"	Plies; Henson Willingham; Romero Graham; Levatte	Hen and Ro	4:16
4.	"On My Dick"	Plies; Buddy Long	GoldRu$h	3:54
5.	"1 Mo Time"	Plies; Jonathan Rotem	Jonathan "J.R." Rotem	3:47
6.	"I Am the Club"	Plies; Rotem	Jonathan "J.R." Rotem	3:44
7.	"Runnin' My Momma Crazy"	Plies; Daniel Valbrun; Joseph Valbrun; Levatte; Martin	DVS Productions	4:15
8.	"Shawty" (featuring T-Pain)	Plies; Christopher Gholson; Ferrell Miles; Faheem Najm; Maurice White; Verdine White; Eddie del Barrio	Drumma Boy; Ensayne	4:15
9.	"Friday"	Plies; Rotem; Eric Coomes	Jonathan "J.R." Rotem	3:39
10.	"Goons Lurkin'"	Plies; Sewell	Midnight Black	3:52
11.	"Kept It Too Real"	Plies; Tommy Caesar, Jr.	The Beat Eaters	4:55
12.	"You" (featuring Tank)	Plies; Philip Lawrence; Jason Epperson	Jay E	3:38
13.	"Money Straight"	Plies; Willingham; Graham; Levatte	Hen and Ro	4:23
14.	"Hypnotized" (featuring Akon)	Plies; Aliaune Thiam	Akon	3:09
15.	"Murkin' Season"	Plies; Willingham; Graham; Levatte	Hen and Ro	3:49

Best Buy bonus tracks
No.	Title	Writer(s)	Producer(s)	Length
16.	"Water"	Plies; Brandon Green	Bei Maejor	3:28
17.	"Ain't Slippin'" (featuring 4orty)	Plies; Johnny Mollings; Lenny Mollings	DJ Nasty & LVM	3:38
18.	"Got 'Em Hatin'"	Plies; Chadron Moore	Nitti	3:38

Deluxe edition bonus track
No.	Title	Producer(s)	Length
16.	"Bid Long"	Bei Maejor	4:08

== Cut tracks ==
- "Get You Wet" (featuring Pleasure of Pretty Ricky)
- "God I'm Tired of Lyin'"
- "Got it Tight" (featuring Ciara)
- "I Didn't Mean It" (featuring Trina)
- "I Just Want the Paper" (featuring The Notorious B.I.G.)
- "I'm in Love wit Money" (featuring T.I.)
- "M.I.AYO" (featuring Rick Ross)
- "Most Anticipated"
- "Never Tell" (featuring Trick Daddy)
- "Under Cover Cops" (featuring Rich Boy)

Sample credits

- "Shawty" contains samples from "Fantasy", written by Maurice White, Verdine White, and Eddie del Barrio; performed by Earth, Wind & Fire.

== Chart positions ==
=== Weekly charts ===
Chart (2007)	Peak position
US Billboard 200	2
US Top R&B/Hip-Hop Albums (Billboard)	2
US Top Rap Albums (Billboard)	2

=== Year-end charts ===
Chart (2007)	Position
US Billboard 200	157
US Top R&B/Hip-Hop Albums (Billboard)	44
Chart (2008)	Position
US Top R&B/Hip-Hop Albums (Billboard)	51

== Certifications ==
Region	Certification	Certified units/sales
United States (RIAA)	Platinum	1,000,000^{‡}
^{‡} Sales+streaming figures based on certification alone.
