= Want It, Need It =

Single by Plies featuring Ashanti

from the album Da REAList
- Released: March 3, 2009
- Recorded: 2008
- Studio: Deep Productions (Tampa, FL); Chalice Recording Studios (Los Angeles, CA)
- Genre: Pop rap
- Length: 3:50 (album version); 4:15 (radio edit)
- Label: Big Gates, Slip-n-Slide, Atlantic
- Songwriters: D. Bristol, K. Edmonds, S. Johnson, A. Washington, J. Rotem
- Producer: J. R. Rotem

Plies singles chronology
"Put It on Ya" (2008)	"Want It, Need It" (2009)	"Nasty Girl" (2009)

Ashanti singles chronology
"Good Good" (2008)	"Want It, Need It" (2009)	"The Woman You Love" (2011)

"Want It, Need It" is a song by American rapper Plies and features R&B singer Ashanti. "Want It" is the second single from his third studio album Da REAList. The song has received positive reviews and samples "Two Occasions" by The Deele. Plies stated that the track was originally to be a track on his second album Definition of Real, but it did not make the final cut.

== Music video ==
The music video was filmed in Atlanta, Georgia and directed by Yolanda Gerald and Plies. BET's Access Granted filmed the behind the scene footage & aired Saturday February 7, 2009. Want It, Need It premiered on Yahoo! on February 7, 2009. "Want It, Need It" debuted on 106 & Park on Monday, February 9 with a special guest appearance by Plies himself. The video also included model/actress Denyce Lawton. The video has peaked at number 5 on iTunes Top Hip Hop Music Videos and number 20 on iTunes top music videos. The video entered BET's 106 & Park countdown on February 23, 2009 at number 10. The song has remained on the countdown for 14 days, peaking at number 2.

== Formats and track listings ==
These are the formats and track listings of major single releases of "Want It, Need It".

US Promo CD

(Released: January 5, 2009)

1. "Want It, Need It" (Radio edit) – 4:32
2. "Want It, Need It" (Main) – 3:50
3. "Want It, Need It" (Instrumental) – 3:50
4. "Want It, Need It" (Acapella) – 3:50
5. "Want It, Need It" (Remix) Ft Rick Ross - 3:39

Digital download

(Released: February 3, 2009)

1. "Want It, Need It" – 3:50

== Chart performance ==
Chart (2009)	Peak position
U.S. Billboard Hot 100	96

== Personnel ==
- Written by D. Bristol, K. Edmonds, S. Johnson, A. Washington, J. Rotem
- Produced by J. R. Rotem
- Format: Airplay, CD single, music download* Lead & Background Vocals by Plies
- Additional Background Vocals by Jamal Jones & Ashanti
- All Programming by Jamal Jones
- Recorded by: Plies & Ashanti
- Label: Atlantic, Big Gates, Slip-n-Slide

== Release history ==
Region	Date	Label	Format
United States	February 3, 2009	Atlantic, Big Gates Records	Official release
United States	February 3, 2009	Atlantic, Big Gates Records	Radio
United States	February 3, 2009	Atlantic	Music download
