= Shawty (song) =

Single by Plies featuring T-Pain

from the album The Real Testament
- Released: July 10, 2007
- Genre: Hip-hop
- Length: 4:14
- Label: Big Gates; Slip-n-Slide; Atlantic
- Songwriters: Algernod Washington; Faheem Najm; Christopher Gholson; Wayne Miles; Maurice White; Verdine White; Eddie del Barrio
- Producers: Drumma Boy; Ensayne Wayne

Plies singles chronology
| "Shawty" (2007) | "I'm So Hood" (2007) |

T-Pain singles chronology
| "Bartender" (2007) | "Shawty" (2007) | "Cyclone" (2007) |

Music video
- "Shawty" on YouTube

"Shawty" is the debut single by American rapper Plies featuring American singer T-Pain. Released in July 2007, it is Plies' lead single from his debut studio album The Real Testament and samples "Fantasy" by Earth, Wind & Fire. The song won an award at the 2007 Ozone Awards for Best Rap/R&B Collaboration.

== Music video ==
A music video was shot in Orlando, Florida, with director Edwin Decena. Rocko, Rich Boy, Rick Ross, Lil Scrappy, Lil Duval, Trick Daddy, Young Jack Thriller, Tay Dizm, Diamond of Crime Mob, Jay Lyriq, Edgerrin James, and Jevon Kearse made cameo appearances.

== Remixes ==
The official remix, "Shawty (R&B Remix)", features R&B artists Trey Songz and former Pretty Ricky member Pleasure P. A remix featuring Webbie and T-Pain was also released on the mixtape, DJ Smallz: The Best Thing Smoking Vol. 2 (We Still Smokin'). There is also a remix on Wu-Tang Clan affiliate Solomon Childs album The Art of Making Love & War featuring both Plies and T-Pain.

== Charts ==
=== Weekly charts ===
| Chart (2007) | Peak Position |
|---|---|
| New Zealand (Recorded Music NZ) | 10 |
| US Billboard Hot 100 | 9 |
| US Hot R&B/Hip-Hop Songs (Billboard) | 2 |
| US Hot Rap Songs (Billboard) | 1 |
| US Rhythmic Airplay (Billboard) | 1 |

=== Year-end charts ===
| Chart (2007) | Position |
|---|---|
| US Billboard Hot 100 | 60 |
| US Hot R&B/Hip-Hop Songs (Billboard) | 13 |
| US Rap Songs (Billboard) | 2 |
| US Rhythmic (Billboard) | 4 |

== Certifications ==
| Region | Certification | Certified units/sales |
|---|---|---|
| New Zealand (RMNZ) | Platinum | 30,000^{‡} |
| United States (RIAA) | Platinum | 1,000,000^{‡} |
| United States (RIAA) Mastertone | Platinum | 1,000,000^{*} |
^{*} Sales figures based on certification alone.^{‡} Sales+streaming figures based on certification alone.

== See also ==
- List of Billboard number-one rap singles of the 2000s
- List of Billboard Rhythmic number-one songs of the 2000s
