= Plies (rapper) =

American rapper (born 1976)

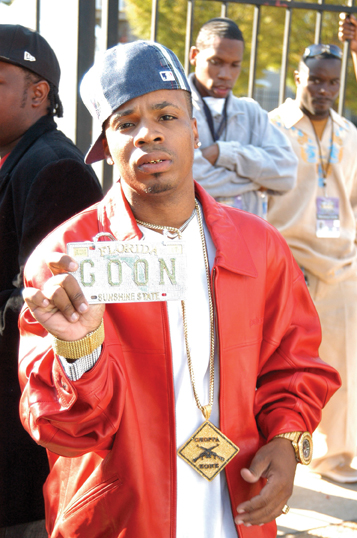
- Plies in 2008

Background information
- Also known as: Piles
- Born: Algernod Lanier Washington; July 1, 1976 (age 50); Fort Myers, Florida, U.S.
- Genre: Southern hip-hop
- Occupations: Rapper; songwriter
- Works: Plies discography
- Years active: 2003–present
- Labels: Big Gates; Slip-n-Slide; Atlantic
- Children: 1
- Website: pliesworld.com

Algernod Lanier Washington (born July 1, 1976), better known by his stage name Plies, is an American rapper. Born in Fort Myers, Florida, Plies was a wide receiver on the Miami University (Ohio) football team from 1995 to 1997. After a brief transfer to University of Central Florida, he dropped out and embarked on a musical career. He signed with the South Florida-based record label Slip-n-Slide Records in 2004; after four mixtapes, he signed a joint venture with Atlantic Records in 2006.

His 2007 single, "Shawty" (featuring T-Pain), peaked within the top ten of the Billboard Hot 100 and served as his mainstream breakthrough. It received platinum certification by the Recording Industry Association of America (RIAA) and preceded his debut studio album, The Real Testament (2007), which spawned the top 15-single "Hypnotized" (featuring Akon) and peaked at number two on the Billboard 200. His second album, Definition of Real (2008), matched its chart position and yielded his second top ten single, "Bust It Baby Pt. 2" (featuring Ne-Yo). His third and fourth albums, Da REAList (2008) and Goon Affiliated (2010), were both met with mixed critical reception; the latter served as his final major label release.

== Early life ==
Plies was born Algernod Lanier Washington in Fort Myers, Florida, and grew up in the city's East Dunbar neighborhood. While at Fort Myers Senior High School, he played wide receiver and defensive back on its football team, was crowned homecoming king, was the valedictorian of his high school class, and was named the "Best Dressed" student of his class.

He attended Miami University under the name Nod Washington, and was a wide receiver on the Miami RedHawks football team from 1995 to 1997. As a freshman in 1995, Washington had 9 receptions for 69 yards. In 1996, his sophomore year, Washington had 25 receptions for 262 yards and 2 touchdowns. He had 5 receptions for 43 yards in his final season at Miami in 1997. Washington then transferred to the University of Central Florida and subsequently dropped out.

== Music career ==
In the late 1990s, Plies became involved with music when his stepbrother, Ronnell Lawrence Lavatte, established the record label Big Gates Records. Although Plies initially refused to rap, after a demonstration for one of his artists, Lavatte decided to keep Plies' verse on the 2003 song "Tell Dem Krackers Dat". Lavatte and Plies promoted the single and traveled many times to Miami; this led to his acquaintance with local record executive Ted Lucas, founder of Slip-n-Slide Records. After signing with the label in 2004, Plies released several mixtapes until his contract entered a distribution deal with Atlantic Records two years later.

=== 2007: The Real Testament ===
The Real Testament was released in August 2007. His debut single "Shawty" featuring T-Pain topped the Billboard Hot Rap Tracks chart and peaked at number 9 on the Hot 100. "Hypnotized", the second single, featured Akon, and peaked at number 3 on the Rap chart and 14 on the Hot 100. The third single was "I Am the Club". On February 29, 2008, the Recording Industry Association of America (RIAA) certified the album Gold for having sold over 500,000 units; five days later the RIAA did the same for singles "Shawty" and "Hypnotized". Plies made guest performances on DJ Khaled's "I'm So Hood", also featuring T-Pain, Trick Daddy and Rick Ross in 2007, which peaked at #19 on the Hot 100 and is included on Khaled second studio album We the Best, and Fat Joe's single "Ain't Sayin' Nothin'" from The Elephant in the Room in early 2008.

=== 2008: Definition of Real and Da REAList ===
Definition of Real, his second album, was released in June 2008, 10 months after releasing his first album. The lead single was "Bust It Baby Pt. 2" featuring Ne-Yo, which peaked at number 2 on both the Hot Rap Tracks and Hot R&B/Hip-Hop Singles & Tracks charts and number 7 on the Hot 100. The album debuted at number 2 on the Billboard 200, selling over 214,000 copies its first week. The next single was "Please Excuse My Hands", featuring Jamie Foxx and The-Dream. RIAA certified Gold "Bust It Baby" on September 17 and Definition of Real October 14.

That same year Plies released his third album, Da REAList, in December 2008, six months after the release of his second album. The first single off this album is "Put It on Ya", featuring Chris J. The album debuted at number 14 on the Billboard 200 with 114,000 copies sold in its first week. The second single is "Want It, Need It", featuring Ashanti, and the third is "Plenty Money". He did a guest performance on Ludacris' single "Nasty Girl" from Ludacris' album Theater of the Mind. He also appeared on DJ Khaled's song "Out Here Grindin', also featuring Akon, Ross, Young Jeezy, Lil Boosie, Ace Hood and Trick Daddy, from Khaled's third album We Global, which peaked at #38 on the Hot 100.

=== 2009–2010: Goon Affiliated ===
In a November 2008 interview with Plies, and according to Slip-n-Slide Records, the rapper announced he completed a fourth album which he planned to release February 16, 2009, but stated the exact date depended on the success of his third album. The album, Goon Affiliated, ended up being released on June 8, 2010. The album's first two singles are "Becky" and "She Got It Made" featuring Bei Maejor. The album debuted at #5 on the Billboard 200, much more successful than his previous album. He continued to make guest appearances on Usher's "Hey Daddy (Daddy's Home)" (that version not making Usher's sixth studio album Raymond vs. Raymond), Gucci Mane's "Wasted", from The State vs. Radric Davis and Young Jeezy's "Lose My Mind", from Jeezy's fourth album Thug Motivation 103: Hustlerz Ambition, all of which made the top 40 of the Hot 100.

In 2010, Plies released a mixtape titled You Need People Like Me on September 3, which included a song titled "Boosie" dedicated to the incarcerated rapper Lil Boosie. On November 18, he released another mixtape titled You Need People Like Me Pt. 2. On December 23, 2010, he released another mixtape titled No Chaser.

=== 2011–present ===
In 2011, Plies released a mixtape titled I Fuck With The DJ on March 15 and a mixtape titled Aristotle on September 1. On May 3, he announced the title for his fifth studio album titled Purple Heart. On September 22, Plies released his first promotional single from the album titled "Just (The Tip)" featuring Jeremih and Ludacris.

In 2012, Plies released a mixtape titled On Trial on February 24, which included the second promotional single from his album Purple Heart titled "With You". On April 17, Plies released a single titled "We Are Trayvon" that was dedicated to Trayvon Martin which all profits from the single be donated to the "Trayvon Martin Foundation".

In 2013, Plies released the promotional single from Purple Heart titled "F**king or What" on July 16 and released the music video for the single on August 22. On September 3, Plies released the promotional single titled "Faithful" featuring singer/songwriter Rico Love.

In 2014, Plies released his mixtape entitled Da Last Real Nigga Left on January 17, and released his mixtape entitled Da Last Real Nigga Left 2 on November 13.

On February 11, 2015, Plies released the first single off of his upcoming fifth album Purple Heart titled "Find You" featuring appearances from K Camp and Lil Wayne. On April 29, Plies released the second single titled "Dayum!", the single is known for Plies addressing the controversy surrounding him getting attacked on stage. On August 8, Plies released a mixtape titled Ain't No Mixtape Bih. On November 19, he released the mixtape Ain't No Mixtape BIH 2.

On January 29, 2016, Plies released a single entitled "Ran Off on da Plug Twice", originally titled "Ritz Carlton", and was included on his mixtape Ain't No Mixtape BIH 2, the music video for the single would be released on November 19, 2015, and would go on to become viral & the single would go on to chart at number forty-two on the Billboard Hot R&B/Hip-Hop Songs. On October 27, 2016, Plies released the single titled "Rich N*gga Shit", the music video for the single would be released on September 2, 2016. On December 13 Plies released the single entitled "Racks Up to My Ear" featuring Young Dolph. He released Ain't No Mixtape BIH 3 on December 15, 2017.

== Artistry ==
David Jeffries of AllMusic described tracks on The Real Testament as covering both gang life and romantic relationships. Similarly, Jeffries described the lyrics of Da REAList as "a spectrum that runs from irresponsible gun talk to irresponsible sex talk". A profile of Plies in the December 2008 issue of Vibe magazine observed that Plies constantly referred to himself as "real" in his music and album titles. However, it pointed out that the word "has virtually synonymous with 'criminal' and, in some cases, almost superseded the idea of being able to actually rap". Also in 2008, HipHopDX published an investigative report suggesting that Plies exaggerated his criminal background.

== Personal life ==
Plies' girlfriend Brandy Lacole Lyons gave birth to a son at the University Community Hospital in Tampa, Florida on October 20, 2003. Between 2015 and 2016, Plies gained a notable following as an Instagram personality for his comedic approach to lifestyle advice and other topics. In 2016, Plies posted a video of himself speaking in a car, in regards to an someone wanting to argue with him. He coolly, calmly explained that he can't argue with that person, because they are mad, and he is happy.

Plies was a vocal supporter of Kamala Harris' 2024 presidential campaign. He regularly posted videos on social media discussing political events throughout the campaign season. In September 2024, he released a single, "Mrs. 47", in support of the campaign. After Donald Trump's victory in the election, he released a single titled "We Gone Be Ok".

=== Legal issues ===
On July 2, 2006, after a shooting at a Gainesville, Florida nightclub, Plies was charged with illegal possession of a concealed weapon, and members of his entourage were charged with attempted murder. The shooting, in which 5 people were injured, started after Plies' microphone was cut off for Lil Boosie to perform, after Plies' performance ran over time. According to the promoter Jonathan Smith, Plies became "enraged". A fight began with fists and shouting, and ended with at least six rounds of bullets being fired.

In January 2017, Plies was arrested in Wesley Chapel, Florida for driving under the influence. Plies refused a roadside blood alcohol content test and was taken into custody.

In November 2024, Plies sued Megan Thee Stallion, Glorilla, and Soulja Boy over his song "Me & My Goons" for sampling it while the track was still infringed on Soulja's "Pretty Boy Swag."

=== Concert altercation ===
On April 3, 2015, a viral video of Plies getting attacked on stage during a concert in Tallahassee, Florida was released, the attacker would later address the situation stating "I fuck with you bruh, that nigga is one of my top five artists, that nigga started talking that bullshit. So I dropped his ass like any real nigga would do like bitch, fuck you bruh." On April 29, 2015, Plies would release a single titled "Dayum!" addressing the attack.

== Discography ==
Studio albums

- The Real Testament (2007)
- Definition of Real (2008)
- Da REAList (2008)
- Goon Affiliated (2010)

== Awards and nominations ==
- BET Hip-Hop Awards
  - 2008: Ringtone of the Year ("Bust It Baby Pt 2" with Ne-Yo) (Nominated)
  - 2008: People's Champ Award ("Bust It Baby Pt 2" with Ne-Yo) (Nominated)
  - 2008: Best Collaboration ("Bust It Baby Pt 2" with Ne-Yo) (Nominated)
- Ozone Awards
  - 2007: Best Rap/R&B Collaboration ("Shawty" with T-Pain) (Won)
  - 2008: Best Rap Album (The Real Testament) (Nominated)
  - 2008: Best Rap/R&B Collaboration ("Bust It Baby Pt. 2" with Ne-Yo) (Nominated)
  - 2008: Club Banger of the Year ("I'm So Hood" with DJ Khaled, Trick Daddy, T-Pain and Rick Ross) (Nominated)
- Grammy Awards
  - 2011: Best Rap Performance By A Duo Or Group ("Lose My Mind" with Young Jeezy) (Nominated)
