= The Runners production discography =

This is the production discography of The Runners.

== Singles ==
- 2006: "Where Da Cash At" (Curren$y featuring Lil Wayne & Remy Ma)
- 2006: "Hustlin'" (Rick Ross)
- 2006: "Born-N-Raised" (DJ Khaled featuring Trick Daddy, Pitbull, & Rick Ross)
- 2007: "All The Above" (Beanie Sigel featuring R. Kelly)
- 2007: "Go Getta" (Young Jeezy featuring R. Kelly)
- 2007: "Bet That" (Trick Daddy featuring Chamillionaire & Gold Rush)
- 2007: "Dreamin'" (Young Jeezy featuring Keyshia Cole)
- 2007: "I'm So Hood" (DJ Khaled featuring Trick Daddy, Rick Ross, Plies, & T-Pain)
- 2007: "Slap" (Ludacris)
- 2007: "Speedin'" (Rick Ross featuring R. Kelly)
- 2008: "Cash Flow" (Ace Hood featuring T-Pain & Rick Ross)
- 2008: "Out Here Grindin" (DJ Khaled featuring Akon, Rick Ross, Plies, Lil Boosie, Trick Daddy, Ace Hood & Lil Wayne)
- 2008: "Baby Doll" (Girlicious)
- 2008: "Go Hard" (DJ Khaled featuring Kanye West & T-Pain)
- 2009: "Cause A Scene" (Teairra Mari featuring Flo Rida)
- 2009: "Overtime" (Ace Hood featuring Akon & T-Pain)
- 2009: "My Time" (Fabolous featuring Jeremih)
- 2009: "Champion" (Ace Hood featuring Rick Ross & Jazmine Sullivan)
- 2009: "Thinkin' About You"(Mario)
- 2009: "Fed Up" (DJ Khaled featuring Usher, Drake, Young Jeezy, & Rick Ross)
- 2010: "Hey Daddy (Daddy's Home)" (Usher featuring Plies)
- 2010: "Lowkey Poppin" (Kid Ink)
- 2011: "California King Bed" (Rihanna)
- 2011: "I Get Money" (Birdman featuring T-Pain, Lil Wayne & Mack Maine)
- 2011: "Swagger Jagger" (Cher Lloyd)
- 2011: "Cheers (Drink to That)" (Rihanna)
- 2012: "Take It to the Head" (DJ Khaled)
- 2013: "Ready" (Fabolous featuring Chris Brown)
- 2017: "Sounds Good To Me" (Nelly)

== Songs ==
=== 2005 ===
Lil Wayne - Tha Carter II (2005)

- 03. "Money on My Mind"

Fat Joe - All or Nothing (2005)

- 02. "Does Anybody Know"

=== 2006 ===
Rick Ross - Port of Miami

- 09. "Where My Money (I Need That)"
- 11. "Hit U From the Back" (featuring Rodney)
- 14. "It's My Time" (featuring Lyfe Jennings)
- 16. "Hustlin' (Remix)" (featuring Young Jeezy & Jay-Z)

Jim Jones - Hustler's P.O.M.E. (Product of My Environment)

- 05. "Reppin' Time"

Lil Scrappy - Bred 2 Die - Born 2 Live

- 08."Anutha Country Story" (featuring Playboy Tre & Bo Hagon)

Fat Joe - Me, Myself & I

- 04. "No Drama (Clap & Revolve)"

Trick Daddy - Back by Thug Demand (2006)

- 02. "Breaka, Breaka"

=== 2007 ===
Chris Brown - Exclusive

- 08. "Damage"

UGK - UGK (Underground Kingz)

- 10. "Take tha Hood Back" (feat. Slim Thug, Vicious & Middle Fingaz)

T.I. - T.I. vs. T.I.P.

- 11. "We Do This"
- 13. "Don't You Wanna Be High"

DJ Khaled - We the Best

- 08. "Hit 'Em Up" (feat. Paul Wall & Bun B)
- 13. "The Streets" (feat. Shareefa & Willy Northpole)
- 00. "I'm So Hood (Remix)" (feat. T-Pain, Young Jeezy, Ludacris, Busta Rhymes, Big Boi, Lil Wayne, Fat Joe, Birdman & Rick Ross)

R. Kelly - Double Up

- 01. "The Champ" (Co-Produced with R. Kelly) (feat. Swizz Beatz)
- 22. "Good Sex" (Co-Produced with R. Kelly) (feat. Twista) (iTunes Bonus Track)

Trey Songz - Trey Day

- 04. "No Clothes On"

Chamillionaire - Ultimate Victory

- 11. "Come Back to the Streets"

Keyshia Cole - Just Like You

- 02. "Didn't I Tell You" (feat. Too Short)

DJ Drama - Gangsta Grillz: The Album

- 17. "Aye" (feat. Young Dro & Big Kuntry King)

=== 2008 ===
Day26 - Day26

- 07. "Come In (My Door's Open)"

Ace Hood - Gutta

- 02. "Can't Stop" (feat. Akon)

Lil Mama - VYP (Voice of the Young People)

- 03. "One Hit Wonder" (feat. DJ Khaled)

Blood Raw - My Life: The True Testimony

- 13. "I Miss You"

Alfamega - I Am Alfamega

- 00. "G-Code" (feat. Young Jeezy)

Danity Kane - Welcome to the Dollhouse

- 08. "Ecstasy" (feat. Rick Ross)

Rocko - Self Made

- 09. "That's My Money" (feat. KC)

DJ Khaled - We Global

- 04. "Go Ahead" (feat. Fabolous, Flo Rida, Fat Joe, Rick Ross & Lloyd)
- 07. "We Global" (feat. Trey Songz, Fat Joe & Ray J)

Girlicious - Girlicious

- 03. "Liar Liar" (feat. Flo Rida)
- 06. "Already Gone"

Ludacris - Theater of the Mind

- 01. "Intro"

Keyshia Cole - A Different Me

- 03. "Please Don't Stop"

Mario Winans - Untitled

- 00. What Can I Do

=== 2009 ===
Teairra Mari - At That Point

- 00. "Cause A Scene Remix" (feat. Flo Rida, Rick Ross)

Trae - Streets Advocate

- 04. "What Have I Become"

Rick Ross - Deeper Than Rap

- 08. "Lay Back" (feat. Robin Thicke)
- 11. "Bossy Lady" (feat. Ne-Yo)
- 14. "In Cold Blood" (feat. Bang 'Em Smurf)

Ace Hood - Ruthless

- 04. "Overtime" (feat. Akon & T-Pain)
- 05. "Champion" (feat. Jazmine Sullivan & Rick Ross)
- 06. "Love Somebody" (Featuring Jeremih)
- 10. "Wifey Material" (Featuring Lloyd)

Lil' Boosie - Superbad: The Return of Boosie Bad Azz

- 01. "My Avenue (feat. Lil' Phat & Lil' Trill)"

Trick Daddy - Finally Famous: Born a Thug, Still a Thug

- 03. "Da Realest (feat. Kevin Cossom)"

Lloyd - Like Me: The Young Goldie EP

- 00. "Pusha" (feat. Lil Wayne & Juelz Santana)

Akon

- 00. "New York City"

Chris Brown - Graffiti

- 05. "What I Do" (feat. Plies)

Usher - Raymond vs. Raymond

- 00. "Take That" (leftover track)

Wyclef Jean - From the Hut, To the Projects, To the Mansion

- 11. "We Made It"

Lil Scrappy - Tha Grustle

- 06. "Posted"

RichGirl - RichGirl

- 00. "Selfish"

Inkwell - Inkwell

- 00. "Invisible"
- 00. "Therapy"

Rico Love - Rico Love

- 00. "Come Home To You"

Krave

- 00. "Don't Get It"

Mary J. Blige - Stronger with Each Tear

- 01. "Tonight"

Nu Jerzey Devil - The Introduction

- 08. "Dangerous"

=== 2010 ===
Flo Rida

- 00. "Star"

Jessica Jarrell

- 00. "Up and Running"

Nipsey Hussle

- 00. "Here Goes Nothing" (feat. KC)

Alley Boy

- 00. "Introduction To Definition of F*ck Shit"

Justin Bieber - My World 2.0

- 11. " Kiss and Tell " (bonus track)

Trey Songz

- 00. "Make Moves"
- 00. "Trey Day"

Mann

- 00. "So Wavey"

Ludacris - Battle of the Sexes

- 10. "B.O.T.S Radio" (feat. Shawnna & I-20)

DJ Khaled - Victory

- 08. "Killing Me" (feat. Buju Banton, Busta Rhymes & Bounty Killer)
- 09. "Bringing Real Rap Back" (feat. Rum)
- 11. "On My Way" (feat. Kevin Cossom, Bali, Ace Hood, BallGreezy, Ice Berg, Desloc, Gunplay, Rum & Young Cash)

Rick Ross - The Albert Anastasia EP

- 06. "Fire Hazard"

Rick Ross - Teflon Don (album)

- 12. "Audio Meth" (feat. Raekwon)

Ce Ce Segarra

- 00. "Damsel in Distress"

J-Bar

- 00. "What's Up" (feat. Waka Flocka Flame)

DJ Freddy Fed

- 00. "Sell Out Everything" (feat. Young Buck, Murphy Lee & Gunplay)

Akon - Akonic

- 00. "Give It To 'Em" (feat. Rick Ross)

Lisa Maffia - Miss Boss

- 02. "Hardrive"

Nelly - 5.0

- 11. "Liv Tonight" (feat. Keri Hilson)

=== 2011 ===
Billy Blue - Blumanatti

- 03. "Ball 4 Eva"

Torch - U.F.O.

- 07. "Gone"

Cher Lloyd - Cher Lloyd

- 00. "Swagger Jagger"

T.I. - Unreleased

- 00. "We Dont Get Down Like Y'all" (feat. B.o.B)

DJ Khaled - We the Best Forever

- 11. "A Million Lights" (feat. Kevin Rudolf, Tyga, Mack Maine, Jae Millz & Cory Gunz)

Kelly Rowland - Here I Am

- 07. "All Of The Night" (feat. Rico Love)

Ace Hood - Blood, Sweat & Tears

- 08. "Beautiful" (feat. Kevin Cossom)

Kevin Cossom - By Any Means

- 12. "All I Wanna Do"

Lloyd

- 00. "Superhero"
- 00. "Playboy Centerfold"

Bali

- 07. "Mary Jane" (feat. Kevin Cossom)

Karmin

- 00. "Crash Your Party"

Trey Songz

- 00. "Its Gon Be On" (feat. Rico Love)

Nicole Scherzinger - Killer Love

- 00. "Tomorrow Never Dies" (Bonus Track)

=== 2012 ===
Ace Hood - Starvation

- 10. "Promises" (feat. Kevin Cossom)

DJ Khaled - Kiss The Ring

- 10. "Don't Pay 4 It" (feat. Wale, Tyga, Mack Maine and Kirko Bangz)

Chris Brown - Fortune

- 07. "Biggest Fan"
- 21. "Do It Again" (UK and Ireland Deluxe Edition only)

Flo Rida - Wild Ones

- 10. "Louder" (Japanese Deluxe Edition only)

Rita Ora - ORA

- 03. "How We Do (Party)"

Tamia - Beautiful Surprise

- 01. "Lose My Mind"
- 04. "Believe In Love"
- 08. "Him"

Lupe Fiasco - Food & Liquor II: The Great American Rap Album Pt. 1

- 09. "Heart Donor" (feat. Poo Bear)
- 12. "Brave Heart" (feat. Poo Bear)

=== 2013 ===
Ace Hood - Trials & Tribulations

- 19. Thugs Fall (feat. Kevin Cossom) (Best Buy deluxe edition only)

Rich Gang - Rich Gang

- 11. "Panties to the Side" (featuring French Montana, Tyga, Bow Wow & Gudda Gudda)

John Legend - Love in the Future

- 08. "Save the Night" (produced with Dave Tozer and Jon David Anderson)

=== 2014 ===
Kid Ink - My Own Lane

- 05. "We Just Came to Party" (feat. August Alsina)

Future - Honest

- 01. "Look Ahead"

Kevin McCall - A.D.H.D.

- 03. "Match One"

Young Money - Young Money: Rise of an Empire

- 06. "One Time" (featuring Lil Twist, YG, and Tyga) (produced with Jess Jackson)

Kevin Gates - By Any Means

- 10. "Arm And Hammer" (produced with The Monarch)
