= The Solution (Beanie Sigel album) =

Studio album by Beanie Sigel
- Released: December 11, 2007
- Genre: Hip-hop
- Length: 50:20
- Label: State Property; Roc-A-Fella; Rock Star; Island Def Jam
- Producer: Cool & Dre; Dirty Harry; Don Cheegro; Dre & Vidal; Dame Grease; Chad "Wes" Hamilton; Eric Hudson; Reefa; Rockwilder; The Runners

Beanie Sigel chronology
The B. Coming (2005)	The Solution (2007)	The Broad Street Bully (2009)

Singles from The Solution
- 1. "All the Above" Released: October 29, 2007

The Solution is the fourth studio album by Philadelphia rapper Beanie Sigel. It was released on December 11, 2007. The album features production from Dre & Vidal, Reefa, and The Runners, among others. Guest appearances include Jay-Z, Ozzy Osbourne, R. Kelly, Ghostface Killah, and other notable musicians.

== Background ==
The Solution is Sigel's first album after re-signing with Roc-A-Fella Records. After his 2005 album, The B. Coming, he took a one-year hiatus from music and returned to recording in 2006. Speaking on the album, Beanie Sigel said:

I'm an emotional guy, in a good sense. A lot of people say [my music is] depressing, but I say it's reality. At that time it was cool because I was at a depressing stage in my life with my legal issues and everything. I had a lot of songs that I felt needed to be out there. It was more conscious than depressing. But this album is just me listening to what's out there and trying to go far left, away from what's going on. It's me making that hard music. This is just life experiences and things that I go through. I just try to put out good, relevant music. Not to knock what anybody else is doing, but a lot of that music don't be relevant to any type of situation.

== Music ==
=== Guests ===
R. Kelly is featured on the first single, "All the Above", while rapper Styles P is featured on "U Ain't Ready 4 Me". Jay-Z makes an appearance on the track "Gutted", while Diddy, Ghostface Killah, and Peedi Crakk hook up with Beanie on "Shake It For Me". Scarface is also featured on the song "Rain (Bridge)" with R&B artist Raheem DeVaughn, who also appears on "Prayer". Beanie Sigel jumps into unfamiliar territory by featuring an Ozzy Osbourne sample on the track "The Day" and a James Blunt sample on "Dear Self (Can I Talk To You)".

=== Production ===
Production originally included producers like Scott Storch and Sha Money XL, but those tracks were cut in favor of songs produced by Eric Hudson and Chad West. Production team Dre & Vidal produce five of the thirteen tracks on the album with help from up-and-coming Dirty Harry and Don Cheegro (Harry and Alex) and The Runners produce the lead single "All the Above". Reefa produces two tracks, including "Gutted", featuring Jay-Z. Cool & Dre and Dame Grease each produced one track. Notably absent from The Solution is primary artist and producer Kanye West.

== Reception ==
Professional ratings
Aggregate scores
Source	Rating
Metacritic	72/100
Review scores
Source	Rating
AllMusic	3.5/5 stars
DJBooth	3.5/5 stars
HipHopDX	3.5/5 stars
Los Angeles Times	2.5/4 stars
Okayplayer	4/5 stars
PopMatters	7/10 stars
RapReviews	8.5/10
Slant	4/5 stars
Pitchfork	6.1/10
USA Today	3/4 stars

The Solution received generally positive ratings after its release. At Metacritic, which assigns a normalized rating out of 100 to reviews from mainstream critics, the album has an average score of 72 based on 10 reviews. Chris Gaerig of PopMatters praised the album, writing, "What Beanie Sigel lacks in sheer marketability he makes up for with a vicious flow and an ingenuity rarely seen from an artist of his caliber," while Slant's Wilson McBee called the album "another hard-boiled testament of ghetto truth-telling."

Jeff Weiss, writing for The Los Angeles Times found that the album "feels unnecessarily bifurcated, with most of its first half devoted to grandiose tough-talk and limp club bangers devoted to passing the Patron. Yet on the record's latter side, Sigel forgets his commercial aspirations to channel his attention inward, providing a rare and extremely compelling glance at his demons." Pitchfork's Tom Breihan observed that The Solution was a "deeply schizophrenic record, one that completely divorces Beanie's cocksure swagger from his introspective depth. Maybe next time around Beanie will figure out how to unleash both of those sides on the same songs, to let them build on each other and complicate things. If that happens, something tells me the Runners won't be involved."

== Commercial performance ==
The Solution opened and peaked at number 37 on the US Billboard 200 with first week sales of 49,000 units. It marked Sigel's first album to miss the chart's top ten. The album also reached number three on Billboard's Top Rap Albums and number seven on the Top R&B/Hip-Hop Albums. By November 2009, the album had sold 346,000 copies domestically.

== Track listing ==
The Solution track listing
No.	Title	Writer(s)	Producer(s)	Length
1.	"All the Above" (featuring R. Kelly)	Dwight Grant; Jermaine Jackson; Andrew Hart; Kevin Cossom; Robert Kelly	The Runners	4:14
2.	"'Bout That (Let Me Know)"	Grant; Marcello Valenzano; Andre Lyon	Cool & Dre	3:31
3.	"U Ain't Ready 4 Me" (featuring Styles P)	Grant; Damon Blackman; David Styles	Dame Grease	3:18
4.	"Go Low" (featuring R. City)	Grant; Eric Hudson; Theron Thomas; Timothy Thomas	Hudson	4:30
5.	"Gutted" (featuring Jay-Z)	Grant; Sharif Slater; Shawn Carter	Reefa	4:07
6.	"Shake It for Me" (featuring Diddy, Ghostface Killah, and Peedi Peedi)	Grant; Dana Stinson; Sean Combs; Dennis Coles; Pedro Zayas; Theo Bowen	Rockwilder	3:33
7.	"I'm In"	Grant; Chad West; Etterlene Jordan; Mark DeBarge; Christopher Wallace; Combs; Rashad Smith; Luther Vandross; Nat Adderley	Chad "Wes" Hamilton	3:12
8.	"H.H.E.H."	Grant; Harry Zelnick; Alexander Chiger; Alrad Lewis	Don Cheegro; Dirty Harry; Boola^{[a]}	3:57
9.	"What They Gonna Say to Me"	Grant; Andre Harris; Vidal Davis	Dre & Vidal	3:43
10.	"The Day" (featuring Ozzy Osbourne)	Grant; Harris; Davis; Zelnick; Chiger; John Osbourne; Tony Iommi; Terence Butler; William Ward; Tupac Shakur; Rufus Cooper; Katari Cox; Joe Paquette; Yafeu Fula; Bruce Washington; Tyrone Wrice	Dre & Vidal; Don Cheegro^{[a]}; Dirty Harry^{[a]}	3:35
11.	"Rain (Bridge)" (featuring Scarface and Raheem DeVaughn)	Grant; Slater; Brad Jordan; Lyon; Raheem DeVaughn	Reefa	5:37
12.	"Dear Self (Can I Talk to You)" (featuring James Blunt)	Grant; Harris; Davis; James Blount; Lukas Burton; Sacha Skarbek	Dre & Vidal	3:18
13.	"Prayer" (featuring Raheem DeVaughn)	Grant; Harris; Davis; DeVaughn	Dre & Vidal	3:45
Total length:				50:20

Notes

- ^{^[a]} denotes co-producer(s)

Sample credits

- "I'm In" embodies portions of "One More Chance / Stay with Me (Remix)", written by Etterlene Jordan, Mark DeBarge, Christopher Wallace, Sean Combs, and Rashad Smith. It also contains samples of "Make Me a Believer", written by Luther Vandross and Nat Adderley, as performed by Luther Vandross.
- "The Day" contains samples from the Black Sabbath recording "War Pigs", written by John Osbourne, Tony Iommi, Terence Butler, and William Ward. It also contains interpolations of "Hail Mary", written by Tupac Shakur, Rufus Cooper, Katari Cox, Joe Paquette, Yafeu Fula, Bruce Washington, and Tyrone Wrice.
- "Dear Self (Can I Talk to You)" contains samples from the James Blunt recording "No Bravery", written by James Blount, Lukas Burton, and Sacha Skarbek.

== Charts ==
=== Weekly charts ===
Weekly chart performance for The Solution
Chart (2007)	Peak position
US Billboard 200	37
US Top R&B/Hip-Hop Albums (Billboard)	7
US Top Rap Albums (Billboard)	3

=== Year-end charts ===
Year-end chart performance for The Solution
Chart (2008)	Position
US Top R&B/Hip-Hop Albums (Billboard)	60
