= Born-N-Raised =

Single by DJ Khaled featuring Pitbull, Trick Daddy and Rick Ross

from the album Listennn... the Album and El Mariel
- Released: September 26, 2006
- Recorded: 2006
- Genre: Hip hop
- Length: 4:19
- Label: Terror Squad; Koch
- Songwriters: Armando Pérez; Maurice Young; William Roberts; Andrew Harr; Jermaine Jackson; Johnny Mollings; Leonardo Mollings
- Producer: The Runners

DJ Khaled singles chronology
"Grammy Family" (2006)	"Born-N-Raised" (2006)	"We Takin' Over" (2007)

Pitbull singles chronology
"Holla at Me" (2006)	"Born-N-Raised" (2006)	"Go Girl" (2007)

Rick Ross singles chronology
"Push It" (2006)	"Born-N-Raised" (2006)	"Make It Rain" (2007)

"Born-N-Raised" is the third single from DJ Khaled's debut album, Listennn... the Album, produced by The Runners. The single features Pitbull, Trick Daddy and Rick Ross. It was released on June 6, 2006. The song is also included on Pitbull's second studio album El Mariel.

== Reception ==
HipHopDX said, when reviewing for Listennn...the Album: "Musically, Khaled and the crew keep it dirty with "Born-N-Raised," which is an infectious anthem.". According to PopMatters: Listennn "opens with the song, in which the local heavyweights Trick Daddy, Pitbull and Rick Ross reestablish their status as the leaders of the pack. The beat barely contains Trick's greasy flow as he proclaims once again, against his own wailing overdubs, that he is a thug. Pitbull bilingually shouts out Trick and Luke (of 2 Live Crew). Rick Ross shines the most, closing the track with carefully enunciated statements proclaiming his greatness and name-checking neighborhoods." RapReviews commented on the song: "The Runners' opening organs and funk of "Born-N-Raised" are laced up." XXL said about "Born-N-Raised": "...inspired collaborations like the Miami anthem “Born N Raised,” featuring Trick Daddy, Rick Ross and Pitbull, and Baby’s ultracatchy “Still Fly” save the project from further mediocrity." Stylus Magazine: "Khaled constantly represents Miami and Dade County throughout Listennn, not the least on the all-star anthem "Born N Raised" featuring Trick Daddy, Pitbull, and Rick Ross."

== Music video ==
This video was directed by Gil Green at a total length of 4:19, and features cameos from actor Steven Bauer, Uncle Luke, Pretty Ricky, Birdman, Slim Thug, Brisco, Wyclef Jean, Ali "Zoe" Adam & Redd Eyez, Cool & Dre, Mr. Collipark, baseball legend Jose Canseco, Fat Joe, Udonis Haslem, Gil Green, and DJ Khaled's wife Nichole Tuck. The video at the end features a brief dedication to Miami DJ DJ Uncle Al

== Charts ==
Chart (2006–2007)	Peak position
US Hot R&B/Hip-Hop Songs (Billboard)	83

== Track listing ==
1. "Born-N-Raised" – 4:19

== Release history ==
Region	Date	Format	Label
United States	September 24, 2006	Digital Download	Koch
