= All the Above =

All the Above may refer to:

- "All the Above" (Beanie Sigel song)
- "All the Above" (Maino song)

== See also ==
- All of the above (disambiguation)
