= Port of Miami (album) =

Studio album by Rick Ross
- Released: August 8, 2006
- Recorded: 2005–2006
- Genre: Southern hip-hop
- Length: 77:49
- Label: Poe Boy; Slip-n-Slide; Def Jam
- Producer: Ted "Touche" Lucas (exec.); Shawn "The Carter Administration" Carter (exec.); E-Class (co-exec.); Shakir Stewart (co-exec.); Kevin "Coach K" Lee (co-exec.); J.R. Rotem; Cool & Dre; The Runners; DJ Nasty & LVM; Akon; Giorgio Tuinfort; C. Fournier; K. Luck; Jazze Pha; Mario Winans; Miykal Snoddy; DJ Toomp; Jean "JRock" Borges; Big Reese; Jasper Cameron; J. Venom; DJ Khaled

Rick Ross chronology
Port of Miami (2006)	Trilla (2008)

Singles from Port of Miami
- 1. "Hustlin'" Released: March 11, 2006; 2. "Push It" Released: May 17, 2006

Port of Miami is the debut studio album by American rapper Rick Ross. Originally titled Career Criminal, the album was renamed, in reference to Miami being a major arrival destination for cocaine shipments to mainland North America. The album was released August 8, 2006, on Poe Boy Entertainment, Slip-n-Slide Records and Def Jam Recordings. The album was engineered by Miami-based songwriting and production team The Monsters & The Strangerz. The album debuted at number one on the US Billboard 200, with 187,000 copies sold in its first week.

The album's first single, "Hustlin'", received an exorbitant amount of airplay. The remix version features Jay-Z and Young Jeezy. The album's second single, "Push It", produced by J. R. Rotem. This track samples the song "Push It to the Limit" from the movie Scarface. Port of Miami was certified gold by the Recording Industry Association of America on November 8, 2006, with over 500,000 copies. According to Soundscan, the album has sold 857,000 copies to date. It was later certified Platinum by the RIAA In July 2016.

A sequel, Port of Miami 2, was released on August 9, 2019.

== Critical reception ==
Professional ratings
Review scores
Source	Rating
AllMusic	2.5/5 stars
DJBooth.net	4/5 stars
Entertainment Weekly	(B)
HipHopDX	3.5/5 stars
RapReviews	7/10 stars
Pitchfork Media	(5.4/10)
Stylus Magazine	C−
Rolling Stone	3/5 stars
USA Today	3/4 stars
XXL	(XL)

Port of Miami was met with generally favorable reviews from music critics. Michael Endelman of Entertainment Weekly said, "On Port of Miami, Ross turns the minute details of drug distribution and dealing into ominous, slow-rolling songs, like the hypnotic, organ-driven hit single "Hustlin'" and the Scarface-goes-South Beach stomp of ”Cross That Line.” In general, the whole "crack-rap" trend (see: Young Jeezy, Clipse) is a disheartening one, but Ross’ pulpy debut manages to enthrall despite the drug-centric lyrics." Sam Ubl of Pitchfork Media said, "Port of Miami is a case of invention begetting necessity. Sure Ross needs these beats—he has all the charisma of a cold meatloaf. But they need him all the same. He's a supporting actor, second fiddle to the real, Pro-Tooled stars, desirable not for his authority or presence but for his utter blankness. Def Jam could heli-drop any bozo into such glorious ambiance and score some hits; the album facilitates sedentariness." Jonathan Ringen of Rolling Stone said, "Ross' minimal, menacing rhymes about being a drug-game kingpin feel a little undercooked, but with synth-soaked ring-tone-ready beats that are hotter than the "MI-Yayo" in the summertime (mostly by local beatmakers Cool and Dre, DJ Khaled and the Runners), it doesn't really matter." Brendan Frederick of XXL said, "While the runaway success of "Hustlin'" could have positioned Ross for one-hit-wonder status, he confidently sidesteps this fate by delivering the goods on Port of Miami. With a cohesive sound the city can call its own, the bearded rapper gets the release he needs by exposing the dark side of the Sunshine State."

== Commercial performance ==
Port of Miami debuted at number one on the US Billboard 200, selling 187,000 copies sold in its first week. In its second week, the album fell to number seven on the chart, selling 79,000 copies. As of July 2013, the album has sold 857,000 copies in the US. On July 28, 2016, the album was certified platinum by the Recording Industry Association of America (RIAA) for sales of over a million copies in the United States.

== Track listing ==
No.	Title	Writer(s)	Producer(s)	Length
1.	"Intro"			0:24
2.	"Push It"	William Roberts II; Jonathan Rotem; Paul Engemann	J.R. Rotem	3:28
3.	"Blow" (featuring Dre)	Roberts II; Andre Lyons; Marcello Valenzano	Cool & Dre	4:10
4.	"Hustlin'"	Roberts II; Andrew Harr; Jermaine Jackson; Johnny Mollings; Leonardo Mollings	The Runners; DJ Nasty & LVM	4:14
5.	"Cross That Line" (featuring Akon)	Roberts II; Aliaune Thiam; Giorgio Tuinfort; C. Fournier	Akon; Tuinfort; Fournier	4:33
6.	"I'm Bad"	Roberts II; Kenny Luckett	K. Luck	3:53
7.	"Boss" (featuring Dre)	Roberts II; Lyons; Valenzano	Cool & Dre	4:40
8.	"For da Low"	Roberts II; Phalon Alexander	Jazze Pha	4:21
9.	"Where My Money (I Need That)"	Roberts II; Harr; Jackson; Mollings; Mollings	The Runners; DJ Nasty & LVM	4:31
10.	"Get Away" (featuring Mario Winans)	Roberts II; Mario Winans; Miykal Snoddy; Greg Mays; Daryl Barnes	Winans; Snoddy	4:06
11.	"Hit U From the Back" (featuring Rodney)	Roberts II; Harr; Jackson; Mollings; Mollings	The Runners; DJ Nasty & LVM	5:05
12.	"White House"	Roberts II; Aldrin Davis	DJ Toomp	4:01
13.	"Pots and Pans" (featuring JRock)	Roberts II; Jean Roberts	JRock	4:35
14.	"It's My Time" (featuring Lyfe Jennings)	Roberts II; Chester Jennings; Harr; Jackson; Mollings; Mollings	The Runners; DJ Nasty & LVM	4:15
15.	"Street Life" (featuring Lloyd)	Roberts II; Lloyd Polite, Jr.; Maurice Sinclair; Jasper Cameron	Big Reese; Cameron	4:07
16.	"Hustlin' (Remix)" (featuring Jay-Z and Young Jeezy)	Roberts II; Shawn Carter; Jay Jenkins; Harr; Jackson; Mollings; Mollings	The Runners; DJ Nasty & LVM	4:44
17.	"It Ain't a Problem" (featuring Triple C's)	Roberts II; Kevin Belnavis; Richard Morales, Jr.	J. Venom	3:47
18.	"I'm a G" (featuring Lil Wayne and Brisco)	Roberts II; Dwayne Carter, Jr.; British Mitchell; Khaled Khaled	DJ Khaled	4:15
19.	"Prayer"	Roberts II; Roberts	JRock	4:08
Total length:				77:49

Leftover tracks

- "The Realist"

Sample credits

- "Push It" contains a sample of "Scarface (Push It to the Limit)" performed by Paul Engemann.
- "I'm Bad" contains a sample of "Theme From S.W.A.T." performed by Rhythm Heritage.
- "Get Away" contains a sample of "Sometimes I Rhyme Slow" performed by Nice & Smooth.
- "Hit U From the Back" contains a sample of "Savoir Faire" performed by Chic.
- "Street Life" contains a sample of "Afterimage" performed by Rush.

== Charts ==
=== Weekly charts ===
Chart (2006)	Peak position
US Billboard 200	1
US Top R&B/Hip-Hop Albums (Billboard)	1

=== Year-end charts ===
Chart (2006)	Position
US Billboard 200	93
US Top R&B/Hip-Hop Albums (Billboard)	18
US Top Rap Albums (Billboard)	7
Chart (2007)	Position
US Top R&B/Hip-Hop Albums (Billboard)	87

== Certifications ==
Region	Certification	Certified units/sales
United States (RIAA)	Platinum	1,000,000^{^}
^{^} Shipments figures based on certification alone.
