= I'm Only Human =

I'm Only Human may refer to:

- "I'm Only Human", an episode of Get Smart originally aired in February 1966
- "I'm Only Human", a song by Rick Ross from the 2008 album Trilla
- I'm Only Human, a 1980 rock album by Michael Des Barres

It may also refer to:

- "Human" (The Human League song), a 1986 song by The Human League
- "Human" (Christina Perri song), a 2013 song by Christina Perri from the album Head or Heart
- "Human" (Rag'n'Bone Man song), a 2016 song by Rag'n'Bone Man
