= All of the Above =

All of the above may refer to:

- All of the Above (Hillsong United album)
- All of the Above (John Hall album)
- All of the Above (J-Live album), or the title song
- All of the Above (Youth Alive album), or the title song
- "All of the Above", a song by Big City Rock
- "All of the Above", a song by Transatlantic from SMPT:e

== See also ==
- "All the Above" (Beanie Sigel song)
- "All the Above" (Maino song)
- None of the above, a ballot choice
