= Holla at Me =

2006 single by DJ Khaled featuring various artists

Single by DJ Khaled featuring Lil Wayne, Paul Wall, Fat Joe, Rick Ross and Pitbull

from the album Listennn... the Album
- Released: February 28, 2006
- Recorded: 2005
- Genre: Hip-hop
- Length: 4:28
- Label: Terror Squad; Koch
- Songwriters: Khaled Khaled; Armando Pérez; Arthur Baker; John Robie; Afrika Bambaataa; Robert Allen; John Miller; Ellis Williams
- Producers: Cool & Dre

DJ Khaled singles chronology
"Holla at Me" (2006)	"Grammy Family" (2006)

Lil Wayne singles chronology
"Hustler Musik" (2006)	"Holla at Me" (2006)	"Shooter" (2006)

Paul Wall singles chronology
"Girl" (2006)	"Holla at Me" (2006)	"Drive Slow" (2006)

Fat Joe singles chronology
"I Don't Care" (2005)	"Holla at Me" (2006)	"Make It Rain" (2006)

Rick Ross singles chronology
"Holla at Me" (2006)	"Hustlin'" (2006)

Pitbull singles chronology
"Holla at Me" (2006)	"Born-N-Raised" (2006)

"Holla at Me" is the debut single by the American rapper DJ Khaled featuring Lil Wayne, Paul Wall, Fat Joe, Rick Ross and Pitbull, released in 2006 from Khaled's first album Listennn... the Album. Produced by Cool & Dre, it samples Afrika Bambaataa and the Soulsonic Force's 1983 song "Looking for the Perfect Beat".

== Chart performance ==
"Holla at Me" debuted and peaked at number 59 on the US Billboard Hot 100 the week of June 24, 2006. It stayed on the chart for four weeks. It also peaked at number 15 on the US Hot Rap Tracks chart in June 2006.

== Music video ==
Jim Jones, Birdman, Johnny Dang, Slim Thug, Remy Ma, Trina, Trick Daddy, DJ Drama, Scott Storch, DJ Clue, Cool & Dre, DJ Felli Fel and DMX all make cameo appearances in the video.

== Charts ==
Chart (2006)	Peak position
US Billboard Hot 100	59
US Hot R&B/Hip-Hop Songs (Billboard)	24
US Hot Rap Songs (Billboard)	15
US Pop 100 (Billboard)	65
US Rhythmic Airplay (Billboard)	34
