= Don't Quit Your Day Job! =

Studio album by Consequence
- Released: March 6, 2007
- Genre: Hip hop
- Length: 49:34
- Labels: GOOD; Columbia; RED Ink
- Producers: Consequence; Koolade; Kanye West; Canei; Younglord; Darren Henson; Keith Pelzer; Len Woolfolk; Karriem Riggins; Keezo Kane

Consequence chronology
| The Wait is Over Vol. 1: The Best of The Cons (2006) | Don't Quit Your Day Job! (2007) | The Cons Vol. 5: Refuse 2 Die (2007) |

Professional ratings
Review scores
| Source | Rating |
|---|---|
| AllMusic | 3.5/5 stars |
| Exclaim! | mixed |
| HipHopDX | 3/5 stars |
| XXL | mixed |

Don't Quit Your Day Job! is the debut studio album by American rapper Consequence. It was released on GOOD Music and Columbia Records on March 6, 2007. The album features the song "Grammy Family", a song with DJ Khaled featuring Kanye West and John Legend, which also appeared on DJ Khaled's debut album Listennn... the Album and was released as a single in 2006. Guest appearances on the album include Kanye West, John Legend, Really Doe and GLC.

In the album's first week, it sold 7,490 units, while also debuting at #1 on the "Billboard" New Artist chart. Consequence also offered a refund deal on his MySpace page, claiming that anyone who purchased the album and didn't like any of the songs could contact him and get their money back.

== Reception ==
William Ketchum of HipHopDX gave the album three stars out of five, saying: "Despite its drawbacks, Don't Quit Your Day Job! is still a solid debut from Consequence and another winner in the GOOD Music catalog."

== Track listing ==
| No. | Title | Writer(s) | Producer(s) | Length |
|---|---|---|---|---|
| 1. | "Job Song" | Dexter Mills; Matko Šašek; Bob James | Koolade | 3:18 |
| 2. | "Don't Forget Em" | Mills; Kanye West; Milton Nascimento | West | 3:59 |
| 3. | "Uptown" | Mills; Canei Finch | Canei | 3:44 |
| 4. | "The Good, the Bad, the Ugly" (featuring Kanye West) | Mills; William Mitchell | West | 4:11 |
| 5. | "Night, Night" | Mills; Richard Frierson | Younglord | 2:57 |
| 6. | "Pretty Little Sexy Mama" | Mills; Lamont Dozier; McKinley Jackson; James Reddick | Darren Henson; Keith Pelzer | 3:22 |
| 7. | "On Break (Skit)" | Mills; Len Woolfolk | Consequence | 0:43 |
| 8. | "Feel This Way" (featuring John Legend) | Mills; Woolfolk; John Stephens | Woolfolk | 4:11 |
| 9. | "Callin' Me" | Mills; Frierson | Younglord | 3:36 |
| 10. | "Disperse" (featuring GLC and Really Doe) | Mills; Šašek; Leonard Harris; Warren Trotter | Koolade | 4:41 |
| 11. | "Yo Dex! (Skit)" (featuring DJ Swivel) | Mills; Karriem Riggins | Consequence | 0:46 |
| 12. | "Uncle Rahiem" | Mills; Riggins | Riggins | 4:09 |
| 13. | "Grammy Family" (DJ Khaled & Consequence featuring Kanye West & John Legend) | Mills; Khaled Khaled; West; Stephens | West; Jon Brion | 3:24 |
| 14. | "Good News, Bad News (Skit)" | Mills; Vinney Barnett; Bobby Eli | Consequence | 1:17 |
| 15. | "Who Knew My Luck Would Change?" | Mills; Keith Moore; Barnett; Eli | Keezo Kane | 5:16 |
| 16. | "Blowin' My Phone (Callin' Me Pt. 2)" (iTunes bonus track) | Mills; DeVon Harris | Devo Springsteen | 3:41 |

Sample Credits

- "Job Song" contains a sample of "Nautilus" performed by Bob James
- "Don't Forget 'Em" contains samples of "Catavento" performed by Milton Nascimento and "Tone 10" performed by Takumi Kato
- "The Good, the Bad, the Ugly" contains a samples of "I Wish You Were Here" performed by Al Green and "Mickey's Monkey" performed by The Miracles
- "Pretty Little Sexy Mama" contains a sample of Trying to Hold on to My Woman" performed by Lamont Dozier
- "Disperse" contains a sample of "The World Is a Place" performed by Rhythm
- "Grammy Family" contains samples of "You've Made Me So Very Happy" performed by Lou Rawls and "What the World Is Coming To" performed by Dexter Wansel
- Good News, Bad News" (skit) and "Who Knew My Luck Would Change?" contain a sample of "Love Won't Let Me Wait" performed by Luther Vandross

== Charts ==
| Chart | Peak position |
|---|---|
| Billboard 200 | 113 |
| Top R&B/Hip-Hop Albums | 27 |
| Rap Albums | 12 |
| Independent Albums | 10 |
| Heatseekers Albums | 1 |
