= Here I Am (Rick Ross song) =

Single by Rick Ross featuring Nelly and Avery Storm

from the album Trilla
- Released: March 25, 2008
- Genre: Hip hop; R&B
- Length: 3:29
- Label: Slip-n-Slide, Def Jam, Poe Boy
- Songwriter: W. Roberts
- Producer: Drumma Boy

Rick Ross singles chronology
"The Boss" (2008)	"Here I Am" (2008)	"Cash Flow" (2008)

Nelly singles chronology
"Party People" (2008)	"Here I Am" (2008)	"Body on Me" (2008)

Avery Storm singles chronology
"Terrified" (2008)	"Here I Am" (2008)

"Here I Am" is the third single from Rick Ross's second album Trilla. It features Nelly and Avery Storm. This song, produced by Drumma Boy, contains an interpolation of Stevie Wonder's "Lately". Video appearances made are DJ Khaled, Birdman, Brisco, Pitbull, Dre, Felicia Pearson, Ace Hood and others. After the song ends, the video cuts to Ross's other song, "Maybach Music". The single peaked at number 41 on the US Billboard Hot 100 chart. Originally, the third single was going to be "Luxury Tax", but it was changed to "Here I Am". The song was ranked as #50 by Vibe in 'The Best Songs Of '08'.

There is a version without Ross that features Avery Storm as the lead artist and features Pitbull.

The official remix features new Maybach Music Group artist Magazeen.

== Chart performance ==
The single debuted at number 99 on the US Billboard Hot 100 chart. The single eventually peaked at number 41 on the chart the week of August 23, 2008. On October 13, 2015, the single was certified gold by the Recording Industry Association of America (RIAA) for sales of over 500,000 copies in the United States.

== Music video ==
The video starts out in a driveway with Rick Ross and a woman (played by video model Kia Samuel) in a car, parked at her house. He is talking to the woman and the woman's mother comes out of the house and yells for her to come back inside, because she does not like her daughter dating Rick Ross since he is a thug. The camera later flashforwards and shows them successful and at a mansion. Inside, men are with their girlfriends. Nelly and Avery Storm also make cameos rapping their verses. The video proceeds and it shows multiple parts of the house, which all show Rick Ross with the woman walking, laughing, and talking. It also shows flashbacks of when they were poor and the struggles of their relationship. After the song ends, the video cuts to Ross' other song, "Maybach Music."

DJ Khaled, Ace Hood, Pitbull, Brisco, Gunplay, Birdman, Larry Hughes, and Felicia "Snoop" Pearson make cameo appearances.

== Charts ==
=== Weekly charts ===
Chart (2008)	Peak position
US Billboard Hot 100	41
US Hot R&B/Hip-Hop Songs (Billboard)	9
US Hot Rap Songs (Billboard)	5
US Pop 100 (Billboard)	86
US Rhythmic Airplay (Billboard)	12

=== Year-end charts ===
Chart (2008)	Position
US Hot R&B/Hip-Hop Songs (Billboard)	59

== Certifications ==
Region	Certification	Certified units/sales
New Zealand (RMNZ)	Gold	15,000^{‡}
United States (RIAA)	Gold	500,000^{‡}
^{‡} Sales+streaming figures based on certification alone.
