= Consequence (rapper) =

American rapper (born 1977)

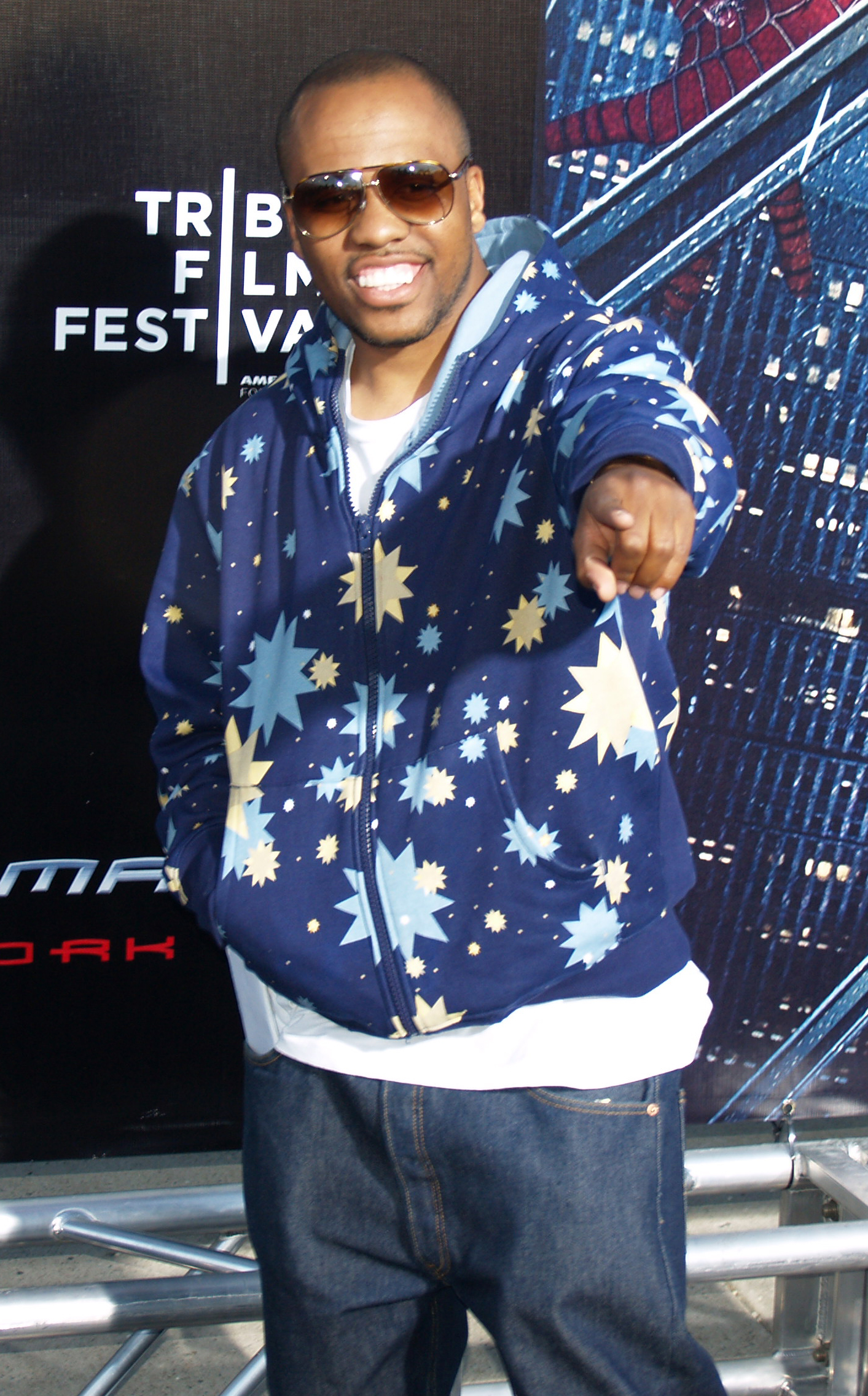
- Consequence in 2007
- Born: Dexter Raymond Mills Jr. Queens, New York City, U.S.
- Other names: Cons; Quence; Ray Tip
- Occupations: Rapper; songwriter
- Years active: 1993–present
- Children: 1
- Relatives: Q-Tip (cousin)
- Musical career
- Genres: East Coast hip-hop
- Labels: GOOD; Sony Urban; Columbia; RED Ink; 192; Hitmaker Distro

Dexter Raymond Mills Jr., known professionally as Consequence, is an American rapper from New York City. He is best known for his collaborative work with A Tribe Called Quest and Kanye West.

== Career ==
Consequence debuted in 1996, appearing several times on A Tribe Called Quest's fourth album Beats, Rhymes, and Life, as he is the cousin of member Q-Tip. In March 2007, he released his debut album Don't Quit Your Day Job!, under Columbia Records and Kanye West's GOOD Music. Consequence left GOOD Music in 2011, on bad terms, after being signed with the label since 2005. He and West later reconciled. Following his departure from GOOD Music, Consequence has since launched his own record label, Band Camp Records, now known as 192 Records.

== Personal life ==
In 2020, Consequence came forth about his battle with lupus. Consequence and Love & Hip Hop: New York co-star and music blogger Jen The Pen are the parents of rapper Caiden The Crownholder (born August 17, 2011).

== Discography ==
=== Studio albums ===
Year	Title	Chart positions			
Year	Title	U.S.	U.S. Rap	U.S. Independent	U.S. Heatseekers
2007	Don't Quit Your Day Job!: Released: March 6, 2007; Label: GOOD, Columbia; Format: CD (#8287689631), digital download	113	12	10	1
2024	Nice Doing Business With You: Released: September 27, 2024; Label: 192, Hitmaker Distro; Format: Digital download	-	-	-	-

=== EPs ===
- A Good Comeback Story (2016)

=== Mixtapes ===
- The Cons Vol. 1: All Sales Are Final (2002)
- The Cons Vol. 2: Make The Game Come To You (2003)
- Take 'Em To The Cleaners (2004)
- A Tribe Called Quence (1995-2004) (2005)
- The Cons Vol. 3: Da Comeback Kid (2005)
- The Cons Vol. 4: Finish What You Started (2006)
- The Wait Is Over Vol. 1: The Best Of The Cons (2006)
- The Cons Vol. 5: Refuse 2 Die (2007)
- Movies on Demand (2010)
- Movies on Demand II (2011)
- Movies on Demand III (2011)
- Curb Certified (2011)
- Movies on Demand IV (2013)

=== Singles ===
Year	Single	Chart positions	Album
Year	Single	US R&B	Album
1997	"Queens Get the Money" (featuring Havoc)	—	Niggaz Get the Money EP
2003	"Turn Ya Self In"	—	Take 'Em to the Cleaners
2005	"Caught Up in the Hype"	—	Non-album single
2006	"Callin' Me"	—	Don't Quit Your Day Job!
2007	"Don't Forget 'Em"	—	Don't Quit Your Day Job!
2007	"The Good, the Bad, the Ugly" (featuring Kanye West)	—	Don't Quit Your Day Job!
2008	"Job Song"	—	Don't Quit Your Day Job!
2009	"Whatever U Want" (featuring Kanye West and John Legend)	– (Note: "Whatever U Want" did not enter the Hot R&B/Hip-Hop Songs chart, but peaked at number 4 on the Bubbling Under R&B/Hip-Hop Singles chart.)	Non-album single
2010	"Down This Road" (featuring Maino)	–	Non-album single
2012	"Something Light" (featuring Pooch Hall)	—	Non-album single
2013	"Going Thru Withdrawal" (featuring Mysonne & Jae Millz)	—	Non-album single
2014	"The Whole World" (featuring Mark Crozer)	—	Non-album single
2017	"All Black Neighborhood" (featuring Royce da 5'9")	—	Non-album single
2017	"Say My Name" (featuring Papoose & Peedi Crakk)	—	Non-album single
2019	"Complex Con" (featuring Conway the Machine)	—	Make Up for Lost Time
2020	"Thanks Ye" (featuring Ant Clemons, Bongo ByTheWay, KayCyy Pluto)	—	No Cap Pack
2022	"Blood Stain"	—	Nice Doing Business With You
2023	"Blood Stain 2" (featuring Amerie and Rick Ross)	—	Non-album single
2024	"No Apologies" (featuring Kanye West)	—	Nice Doing Business With You
2024	"Blood Stain III" (featuring Rick Ross, Ghostface Killah, 38 Spesh, Jim Jones, Caiden The Crownholder)		Non-album single
2025	"Come With Me"		Non-album single

==== As featured artist ====
Year	Single	Chart positions		Album
Year	Single	US	US R&B	Album
2005	"Gone" (Note: "Gone" charted in October 2013, following increased sales as a result of its use in a viral Internet video.) (Kanye West feat. Cam'Ron, Consequence)	18	6	Late Registration
2006	"Grammy Family" (DJ Khaled feat. Kanye West, Consequence, and John Legend)	—	— (Note: "Grammy Family" did not enter the Hot R&B/Hip-Hop Songs chart, but peaked at number 24 on the Bubbling Under R&B/Hip-Hop Singles chart.)	Listennn... the Album and Don't Quit Your Day Job!
2007	"Anything" (Patti LaBelle feat. Kanye West and Consequence)	—	64	The Gospel According to Patti LaBelle

=== Guest appearances ===
- A Tribe Called Quest – "The Chase, Part II" on Award Tour 12" single B-side (1993)
- A Tribe Called Quest – "Glamour and Glitz" on The Show soundtrack (1995)
- A Tribe Called Quest – "Phony Rappers"; "Motivators"; "Jam"; "Mind Power"; "Baby Phife's Return"; "Word Play"; "Stressed Out" on Beats, Rhymes and Life (1996)
- The Creators -- "In and Out"; "Watch Us Touch" on The Weight (2000)
- Kanye West – "Spaceship" on The College Dropout (2004)
- Rell – "Real Love" (2004) - N/A
- Dwele - "Hold On (Remix) [2004] - N/A
- Kanye West – "Electric Relaxation" (Freshmen Adjustment) (2005)
- Miri Ben-Ari – "I've Been Waiting on You" on The Hip-Hop Violinist (2005)
- Talib Kweli & Madlib – "Engine Runnin'" on Liberation (2006)
- DJ Clue - "Uptown" on The Professional 3 (2006)
- Beyoncé – "Suga Mama (Remix)" (2007)
- Statik Selektah – "Express Yourself" on Spell My Name Right! (2007)
- Statik Selektah – "Mr Popularity" on Stick 2 the Script (2008)
- AZ – "Heavy in da Game" (2008)
- Kid Cudi – "Buggin' Out 2009" (2009)
- Nefew – "Biko" on Homesick (2009)
- Kanye West – "Chain Heavy" on G.O.O.D. Fridays (2010)
- Statik Selektah – "Life Is Short" on 100 Proof (2010)
- Son of Light – "Love & Hate" (with Noora Noor) (2012)
- A Tribe Called Quest – "Whateva Will Be"; "Mobius" (with Busta Rhymes), "Black Spasmodic"; "The Killing Season" (with Kanye West and Talib Kweli) on We Got It from Here... Thank You 4 Your Service (2016)
- Danny Brown – "Combat" (with Q-Tip) on U Know What I'm Sayin? (2019)

== Filmography ==
Television
Year	Title	Role	Notes
2013	Love & Hip Hop: New York	Himself	Supporting Cast
