= Blood Stain III =

2024 single by Consequence

Single by Consequence featuring Rick Ross, Ghostface Killah, 38 Spesh, Jim Jones and Caiden The Crownholder
- Released: December 6, 2024
- Recorded: March 2023–2024
- Genre: Hardcore hip-hop
- Length: 4:52
- Label: 192 Records
- Songwriters: Dexter Mills; William Roberts; Dennis Coles; Caiden Mills; Justin Harrell; Joseph Jones
- Producer: Kanye West

Consequence singles chronology
"No Apologies" (2024)	"Blood Stain III" (2024)	"Come With Me" (2025)

"Blood Stain III" is a song by American rapper Consequence. The track features prominent vocals from rappers Rick Ross, Ghostface Killah, 38 Spesh, and Jim Jones, alongside secondary vocals from Consequence's son Caiden The Crownholder. It is a hardcore hip-hop posse cut, featuring production from Kanye West. The song was released on December 6, 2024, under 192 Records, serving as the third and last instalment in Consequence's "Blood Stain" single series.

== Background and promotion ==
The track follows Consequence's singles "Blood Stain" and "Blood Stain 2", a collection of songs featuring similar elements, such as instrumentals, hook components, arrangements, and more. The song was first previewed as a snippet during a VladTV interview in March 2023, with Consequence surfacing it on his Instagram in May.

=== Release ===
On December 6, 2024, the song was officially released following its premiere on the Hot 97 radio station. This release was under Consequence's independent 192 Records.

== Composition and lyrics ==
The track features drum‑based, chipmunk soul production, a style synonymous with the song's producer, Kanye West. Musically, it's built around layered production, incorporating chopped vocal samples, punchy drums, and a smooth bass. Consequence provides the hook and a verse, with the other verses done by Rick Ross, Ghostface Killah, 38 Spesh, and Jim Jones. Caiden The Crownholder, Consequence's son, supplies vocals on the intro, setting up for the rest of the arrangement.

Lyrically, the song revolves around status, stardom and survival during harsh times. Consequence described the song's lyrics as 'authentic rap' in a press release, highlighting the collaborators' performances. HotNewHipHop noted that the punchline-driven guest verse from Ghostface Killah opens with Rick Ross’s slick delivery. The publication also mentioned Jim Jones’s conversational, laid-back presence and 38 Spesh’s closer.

== Reception ==
"Blood Stain III" received positive reviews from critics. Chuck Creekmur for AllHipHop wrote that Consequence's performance 'cements his legacy'. The Garnette Report's Nina LaVigna praised the song's 'loaded feature lineup'. Insomniac Magazine commended the dynamic of rappers over West's instrumental, entitling the track a 'hood music heater' Music journalist Quincy Dominic gave the song a very positive review on his website RatingsGameMusic, praising Consequence's memorable hook and the guest vocalists verses, while highlighting West's production, crediting it as one of his 'most impressive beats of the decade'.
