= Grammy Family =

Single by DJ Khaled featuring Kanye West, Consequence and John Legend

from the album Listennn... the Album and Don't Quit Your Day Job!
- Released: July 1, 2006
- Recorded: September 2005
- Genre: Hip-hop
- Length: 3:24
- Label: Terror Squad; Koch
- Songwriters: Kanye West; Dexter Mills; John Stephens
- Producers: West; Jon Brion

DJ Khaled singles chronology
"Holla at Me" (2006)	"Grammy Family" (2006)	"Born-N-Raised" (2006)

Kanye West singles chronology
"Drive Slow" (2006)	"Grammy Family" (2006)	"Number One" (2006)

John Legend singles chronology
"So High" (2005)	"Grammy Family" (2006)	"Save Room" (2006)

"Grammy Family" is the second single from the American rapper DJ Khaled's debut album, Listennn... the Album. The single features and was written by Kanye West, Consequence and John Legend; Jon Brion assisted West in producing the track. The song also appears on Consequence's album Don't Quit Your Day Job! (2007). The music video features cameos from Fat Joe, Common, and Rick Ross, among others.

== Track listing ==
CD single

1. "Grammy Family" (Clean) – 3:26
2. "Grammy Family" (Explicit) – 3:26
3. "Grammy Family" (Instrumental) – 3:26

== Chart performance ==
On the week that it was officially released as a single, "Grammy Family" debuted and peaked at number 24 on the US Bubbling Under R&B/Hip-Hop Singles chart.

Chart (2006)	Peak position
US Bubbling Under R&B/Hip-Hop Singles (Billboard)	24
