= Ruthless (Ace Hood album) =

Studio album by Ace Hood
- Released: June 30, 2009
- Recorded: 2008–09
- Genre: Hip-hop
- Length: 49:06
- Label: We the Best; Def Jam
- Producer: DJ Khaled (exec.), The Runners (co-exec.), Carvin & Ivan, Cardiak, Schife & OhZee, Kane Beatz, FATBOI, Nard & B, The Inkredibles, J.U.S.T.I.C.E. League, Tricky Stewart, Tha Bizness, Honorable C.N.O.T.E., G4 Music, DJ Nasty & LVM

Ace Hood chronology
Gutta (2008)	Ruthless (2009)	Blood, Sweat & Tears (2011)

Singles from Ruthless
- 1. "Overtime" Released: May 19, 2009; 2. "Champion" Released: June 16, 2009

Professional ratings
Review scores
Source	Rating
AllMusic	3/5 stars
RapReviews	6/10 stars
XXL	3/5 stars

Ruthless is the second studio album by American rapper Ace Hood. It was released on June 30, 2009, by We the Best Music Group and Def Jam Recordings. The album was recorded from 2008 to 2009, and was executively produced by We the Best founder DJ Khaled and The Runners, with the album's production also being handled by The Inkredibles, Kane Beatz, J.U.S.T.I.C.E. League, Tricky Stewart, Tha Bizness, Schife & OhZee, and Honorable C.N.O.T.E., alongside others. The album features guest appearances from producer Schife, alongside Rick Ross, Ludacris, Akon, T-Pain, Jazmine Sullivan, Jeremih, Birdman, The-Dream, Lloyd, and Ball Greezy.

The album was promoted with two singles. The first, "Overtime" (featuring Akon and T-Pain), was released on the 19th of May, 2009, and peaked at number 19 on the Bubbling Under Hot 100 Singles chart, while the second, "Champion" (featuring Jazmine Sullivan and Rick Ross), was released on the 16th of June, 2009, and peaked at number 58 on the Hot R&B/Hip-Hop Songs chart. Upon its release, the album itself debuted at number 23 on the US Billboard 200, selling 19,700 copies in its first week. It would also peak within the top 10 of the Top R&B/Hip-Hop Albums and Top Rap Albums charts.

== Singles ==
The album's first single, "Overtime" (featuring T-Pain and Akon), was released on May 19, 2009. The song was written by Hood, Akon, and T-Pain, alongside Kevin Cossom, who produced the song alongside The Runners. Upon its release, the single charted at number 70 on the Hot R&B/Hip-Hop Songs chart and peaked at number 19 on the Bubbling Under Hot 100 Singles chart. Its music video, filmed by Gil Green, features cameos from The Runners, alongside Rick Ross, DJ Khaled, Birdman, and Serena Williams.

The album's second single, "Champion" featuring (Jazmine Sullivan and Rick Ross), was released on June 16, 2009. The song was produced by the Runners, alongside Carvin & Ivan. Upon its release, the single peaked at number 57 on the Hot R&B/Hip-Hop Songs chart. Its music video, produced by Green, features Green and the Runners, alongside DJ Khaled and Dre of Cool & Dre.

Despite not being released as a single, "Born an OG" (featuring Ludacris) charted at number 19 on the Bubbling Under Hot 100 Singles chart. "Loco Wit the Cake" (featuring Schife), "Bout Me" (featuring Ball Greezy), and "Zone" also received music videos, all directed by Jordan Tower.

== Commercial performance ==
Ruthless was released on the 30th of June, 2009. Upon its release, the album charted at number 23 on the Billboard 200 and number 5 on the Top R&B/Hip-Hop Albums chart, and peaked at number 2 on the Top Rap Albums chart.

== Track listing ==
No.	Title	Writer(s)	Producer(s)	Length
1.	"Get Money" (featuring Rick Ross)	Antoine McColister, Johnny Mollings, Leigh Elliot, Lenny Mollings, Maurice Carpenter, William Roberts II	The Inkredibles	3:54
2.	"Loco Wit the Cake" (featuring Schife)	McColister, Ian "Schife" Lewis	Schife & OhZee	3:47
3.	"Born an OG" (featuring Ludacris)	McColister, J. Mollings, L. Mollings, Christopher Bridges	DJ Nasty & LVM	3:49
4.	"Overtime" (featuring Akon and T-Pain)	McColister, Andrew Harr, Jermaine Jackson, Aliaune Thiam, Faheem Najm, Kevin Cossom	The Runners, Cossom (co.)	4:04
5.	"Champion" (featuring Jazmine Sullivan and Rick Ross)	McColister, Harr, Jackson, Carvin "Ransum" Haggins, Ivan "Orthodox" Barias, Jazmine Sullivan, Roberts II	The Runners, Carvin & Ivan	4:25
6.	"Love Somebody" (featuring Jeremih)	McColister, Harr, Jackson, Andre "The Monarch" Davidson, Jeremih Felton, Cossom	The Runners, Cossom (co.), The Monarch (add.)	5:04
7.	"Don't Get Caught Slippin'"	McColister, J. Mollings, Elliot, L. Mollings, Carpenter	The Inkredibles	3:27
8.	"This Nigga Here" (featuring Schife and Birdman)	McColister, Bryan Williams, Lewis	Schife & OhZee	4:06
9.	"Mine" (featuring The-Dream)	McColister, Christopher "Tricky" Stewart, Terius "The-Dream" Nash	Tricky Stewart	3:40
10.	"Wifey Material" (featuring Lloyd)	McColister, Davidson, Lloyd Polite, Jr.	The Runners, The Monarch (add.)	4:05
11.	"'Bout Me" (featuring Ball Greezy)	McColister, Carl McCormick	Cardiak	3:33
12.	"Zone"	McColister, Dean Metzler	G4 Music, Metzler (co.)	3:57
13.	"Make a Toast"	McColister, J. Mollings, Elliot, L. Mollings, Carpenter	The Inkredibles	3:55

== Charts ==
Chart (2009)	Peak position
US Billboard 200	23
US Top R&B/Hip-Hop Albums (Billboard)	5
US Top Rap Albums (Billboard)	2
