= The Boss (Rick Ross song) =

Single by Rick Ross featuring T-Pain

from the album Trilla
- Released: February 12, 2008
- Recorded: 2007
- Genre: Hip hop; mafioso rap; R&B
- Length: 3:45
- Label: Slip-n-Slide, Def Jam, Poe Boy
- Songwriters: F. Najm, W. Roberts, J. Rotem
- Producer: J. R. Rotem

Rick Ross singles chronology
"Speedin'" (2007)	"The Boss" (2008)	"Here I Am" (2008)

T-Pain singles chronology
"Shawty Get Loose" (2008)	"The Boss" (2008)	"She Got It" (2008)

"The Boss" is a song by American rapper Rick Ross featuring American singer T-Pain. It was released as the second single from his second studio album Trilla. It samples the song "Paul Revere" by Beastie Boys. It is produced by J. R. Rotem. Matt Kemp from the Los Angeles Dodgers and Brian McCann from the Houston Astros use this song as their at-bat / intro music. The song is also Ross's highest-charting single to date, peaking at number 17 on the US Billboard Hot 100.

== Music video ==
The video was directed by Diane Martel, and shows a shirtless Rick Ross in bed with two girls. He is then seen yelling at someone who owes him money on the phone and tells him to meet him at midnight. At midnight, the man who owes him money shows up and tells him that he does not have it. Rick Ross calls a girl (portrayed by Felicia "Snoop" Pearson) who steals his necklace and Rick Ross steals his girlfriend. Fat Joe, along with DJ Khaled and Anwan Glover from HBO's television series The Wire, make appearances in the video. The music video premiered on Rap City on February 19, 2008.

== Remix ==
There is an unofficial remix to the song known as the Mick Boogie Remix, it features Lil' Wayne (verse from Trina's "Don't Trip"), Red Cafe & Fabolous (verses from the freestyle of the song named "F*** Em All" with DJ Drama), Rick Ross' 1st verse, & T-Pain's chorus. It is commonly mistaken as the official remix. D12 recorded a remix for their Return of the Dozen mixtape called "I'm a G". Hussein Fatal recorded a remix. Nicki Minaj did a remix on her mixtape Sucka Free. Freestyles were also recorded by Ludacris (Big Ass House) Dolla, KiD CuDi, Wiz Khalifa, & Meek Millz.

== Charts ==
=== Weekly charts ===
Chart (2008)	Peak position
US Billboard Hot 100	17
US Hot R&B/Hip-Hop Songs (Billboard)	5
US Hot Rap Songs (Billboard)	2
US Pop 100 (Billboard)	53
US Rhythmic Airplay (Billboard)	6

=== Year-end charts ===
Chart (2008)	position
US Billboard Hot 100	84
US Hot R&B/Hip-Hop Songs (Billboard)	33
US Rhythmic (Billboard)	28

== Certifications ==
Region	Certification	Certified units/sales
United States (RIAA)	Platinum	1,000,000^{‡}
United States (RIAA) Mastertone	Platinum	1,000,000^{*}
^{*} Sales figures based on certification alone.^{‡} Sales+streaming figures based on certification alone.
