= We Global =

Studio album by DJ Khaled
- Released: September 16, 2008
- Recorded: November 2007 – June 2008
- Studio: Terror Squad Studios, The Bronx, New York City, New York, We the Best Studios North Miami, Florida
- Genre: Hip-hop
- Length: 63:58
- Label: We the Best; Terror Squad; Koch
- Producer: DJ Khaled; The Runners; Timbaland; The Inkredibles; Isaac Opus; DJ Nasty & LVM; Danja; Gold Ru$h; Lu Diaz; Cool & Dre

DJ Khaled chronology
We the Best (2007)	We Global (2008)	Victory (2010)

Singles from We Global
- 1. "Out Here Grindin" Released: June 24, 2008; 2. "Go Hard" Released: November 19, 2008

We Global is the third studio album by American disc jockey and record producer DJ Khaled. It was released on September 16, 2008, by We the Best Music Group, Terror Squad Entertainment and Koch Records. The album contains guest appearances from The Game, T-Pain, Bun B, Rick Ross, Ace Hood, Plies, Akon, Trick Daddy, Blood Raw, Brisco, Birdman, Lil Boosie, Nas, Kanye West, Fabolous, Fat Joe, Sean Paul, Busta Rhymes, Pitbull, Casely and Flo Rida among others.

The album's first single, "Out Here Grindin" leaked on May 5, 2008. The song features Akon, Rick Ross, Lil Boosie, Trick Daddy, Ace Hood and Plies. The single debuted and peaked at number 38 on the US Billboard Hot 100. The album's second single was "Go Hard" featuring Kanye West and T-Pain. The song peaked at number 69 on the US Billboard Hot 100.

== Critical reception ==
Professional ratings
Review scores
Source	Rating
AllMusic	3.5/5 stars
DJBooth	3/5 stars
Pitchfork	4.3/10
RapReviews	7.5/10
XXL	3/5 stars

Steve 'Flash' Juon of RapReviews gave praise to "Out Here Grindin'" and "Go Hard" for having easily catchy beats and rhymes, and the rest of the track listing for carrying "mega crossover potential." He concluded that, "Khaled doesn't even act much as a producer, letting other hot mixers shine on his CD's, so he plays the role of "executive producer" at best. Even though I think We Global would be more honest if Khaled put the words "we present" in front of it, the road to the title has been laid down for one more run and Khaled's going to get as close with this one as any attempt thus far. Best of luck to him." DJBooth's Nathan Slavik found the record to be a "definite improvement" over We the Best, highlighting "Go Hard", "I'm On", "Red Light" and "Bullet" for utilizing its producers and artists well to craft "hip-hop chemistry", but was critical of songs like "Final Warning" and the title track for being "musically malnourished" and display Khaled overreaching as a musical curator, saying "In the end that means that if DJ Khaled is indeed a hip-hop coach than he’s put together a solid game plan on We Global, he just made some questionable substitutions and time-out calls."

== Commercial performance ==
The album debuted at number seven on the US Billboard 200, selling 59,573 copies in the first week.

== Track listing ==
No.	Title	Writer(s)	Producer(s)	Length
1.	"Standing on the Mountain Top" (featuring Ace Hood and Pooh Bear)	Khaled Khaled; Antoine McColister; M. Ellizee	DJ Khaled	2:36
2.	"Go Hard" (featuring Kanye West and T-Pain)	Khaled; Kanye West; Faheem Najm; Andrew Harr; Jermaine Jackson	The Runners	4:32
3.	"Out Here Grindin" (featuring Rick Ross, Akon, Ace Hood, Plies, Lil Boosie and Trick Daddy)	Khaled; William Roberts; Aliaune Thiam; McColister; Algernod Washington; Torence Hatch; Maurice Young; Najm; Harr; Jermaine Jackson	The Runners	3:57
4.	"Go Ahead" (featuring Fabolous, Rick Ross, Flo Rida, Fat Joe and Lloyd)	Khaled; John Jackson; Roberts; Tramar Dillard; Joseph Cartagena; Lloyd Polite Jr.; Harr; Jermaine Jackson	The Runners	4:04
5.	"I'm On" (featuring Nas)	Khaled; Nasir Jones; Marcello Valenzano; Andre Lyon	Cool & Dre	4:24
6.	"Red Light" (featuring Game)	Khaled; Jayceon Taylor; Maurice Carpenter; Leigh Elliott; Johnny Mollings; Lenny Mollings; Teddy Randazzo	The Inkredibles	4:21
7.	"We Global" (featuring Trey Songz, Fat Joe and Ray J)	Khaled; Tremaine Neverson; Cartagena; William Norwood Jr.; Harr; Jermaine Jackson	The Runners	3:22
8.	"She's Fine" (featuring Sean Paul, Missy Elliott and Busta Rhymes)	Khaled; Sean Paul Henriques; Missy Elliott; T. Graves; Nathaniel Hills	Danja	3:22
9.	"Final Warning" (featuring Bun B, Blood Raw, Ace Hood, Brisco, Bali, Lil Scrappy, Shawty Lo and Rock City)	Khaled; Bernard Freeman; Bruce Falson; McColister; British Mitchell; McClyndon Randolph; Darryl Richardson II; Carlos Walker; Timothy Thomas; Theron Thomas; Carpenter; Elliott; J. Mollings; L. Mollings	The Inkredibles	4:16
10.	"Fuck the Other Side" (Trick Daddy featuring Dunkrydas)		GoldRu$h	3:43
11.	"Bullet" (featuring Rick Ross and Baby Cham)	Khaled; Roberts; Damian Beckett; J. Mollings; L. Mollings; Noel Davey; Lloyd James; Johnny Osbourne; Ian Smith	DJ Nasty & LVM	4:08
12.	"Blood Money" (featuring Rick Ross, Brisco, Ace Hood and Birdman)	Khaled; Roberts; Mitchell; McColister; Bryan Williams; Isaac Petit-Frere	Isaac Opus	4:55
13.	"Defend Dade" (featuring Pitbull and Casely)	Khaled; Armando Perez; Jean-Carlos Casely; Luis Diaz	Lu Diaz	4:36
Total length:				52:17

Best Buy bonus tracks
No.	Title	Producer(s)	Length
14.	"Foolish (Remix)" (Shawty Lo featuring DJ Khaled, Birdman, Rick Ross and Jim Jones)	DJ Montay	3:59
15.	"I'm the Shit" (featuring Ball Greezy, Brisco and Ace Hood)	Gorilla Tek	3:46
16.	"Vibin' (Remix)" (performed by Piccalo featuring DJ Khaled and Ace Hood)	JRock	3:44

iTunes bonus tracks
No.	Title	Length
14.	"What You Gonna Do to Me" (performed by K.A.R. featuring Rob Cash, Mike Beck and Fat Joe)	3:33
15.	"Out Here Grindin' (instrumental)"	4:23
16.	"Go Hard (instrumental)"	4:37
17.	"Go Ahead (instrumental)"	4:04

Samples credits

- "Go Hard" contains a sample of "Angel" by Madonna.
- "Out Here Grindin" contains a sample of "What's Beef?" by The Notorious B.I.G.
- "Red Light" contains a sample of "Trace of Your Love" by Joe Simon.
- "What You Gonna Do to Me" contains a sample of "A Cold Day in Hell" by Wings of Plague.

== Charts ==
=== Weekly charts ===
Weekly chart performance
Chart (2008)	Peak position
Canadian Albums (Nielsen SoundScan)	33
US Billboard 200	7
US Independent Albums (Billboard)	1
US Top R&B/Hip-Hop Albums (Billboard)	4
US Top Rap Albums (Billboard)	3

=== Year-end charts ===
Year-end chart performance
Chart (2008)	Position
US Independent Albums (Billboard)	29
US Top R&B/Hip-Hop Albums (Billboard)	93
