= Gossip (Lil Wayne song) =

Single by Lil Wayne

from the album The Leak
- Released: December 18, 2007
- Recorded: 2007
- Genre: Hip hop
- Length: 3:45
- Label: Cash Money
- Songwriter: Dwayne Carter, Jr.
- Producer: StreetRunner

Lil Wayne singles chronology
"100 Million" (2007)	"Gossip" (2007)	"I'm Me" (2007)

"Gossip" is the first single from Lil Wayne's EP The Leak. The single was released December 18, 2007 to the iTunes Store. The song contains samples of "Stop! in the Name of Love" as performed by Margie Joseph.

== Music video ==
Whilst performing the song in concert at the House of Blues in San Diego, California, American music video director and editor Matt Alonzo filmed Wayne's performance and later edited it for release. The video was uploaded on February 1, 2008, through Alonzo's YouTube account.

== Charts ==
Chart (2007–2008)	Peak position
US Bubbling Under Hot 100 (Billboard)	14
US Bubbling Under R&B/Hip-Hop Singles (Billboard)	9

== Release history ==
Region	Date	Format(s)	Label	Ref.
United States	November 13, 2007	Rhythmic contemporary radio	Universal Motown	
