= All I Do Is Win =

2010 single by DJ Khaled featuring T-Pain, Ludacris, Snoop Dogg and Rick Ross

Single by DJ Khaled featuring T-Pain, Ludacris, Snoop Dogg and Rick Ross

from the album Victory
- Released: February 8, 2010
- Recorded: 2009
- Genre: Hip-hop
- Length: 3:52
- Label: We the Best; Terror Squad; E1
- Songwriters: Khaled Khaled; Faheem Najm; Christopher Bridges; Calvin Broadus; William Roberts; Johnny Mollings; Leonardo Mollings
- Producers: DJ Khaled; DJ Nasty; LVM

DJ Khaled singles chronology
"Put Your Hands Up" (2010)	"All I Do Is Win" (2010)	"Welcome to My Hood" (2011)

T-Pain singles chronology
"Imagínate" (2010)	"All I Do Is Win" (2010)	"Tattoo Girl (Foreva)" (2010)

Ludacris singles chronology
"Baby" (2010)	"All I Do Is Win" (2010)	"My Chick Bad" (2010)

Snoop Dogg singles chronology
"Gangsta Luv" (2010)	"All I Do Is Win" (2010)	"Kush" (2010)

Rick Ross singles chronology
"Super High" (2010)	"All I Do Is Win" (2010)	"Pullin' on Her Hair" (2010)

"All I Do Is Win" is a song by American DJ and record producer DJ Khaled featuring American musicians T-Pain, Ludacris, Snoop Dogg, and Rick Ross. It was released on February 8, 2010 as the third single from the former's fourth studio album Victory, along with "Put Your Hands Up". The song peaked at number 24 on the US Billboard Hot 100 chart. The single was certified triple platinum by the Recording Industry Association of America (RIAA).

== Music video ==
The music video debuted on BET's 106 & Park on March 3, 2010, along with the video for "Put Your Hands Up". It pictures DJ Khaled with his BET Awards and is filmed mostly against a green screen, also featuring a scene of his appearance at the 2008 BET Hip Hop Awards show accepting an award for the remix of his song "I'm So Hood".

A video for the official remix was shot in Florida. The video was directed by Dayo and Gil Green. Photos of the shoot were also leaked online. The video features cameos from Nicki Minaj, Fabolous, Fat Joe, Jadakiss, Diddy, Ace Hood, Cam'ron, and Busta Rhymes. A behind-the-scenes video was released on June 2, 2010. The remix's music video was released on June 29, 2010.

== Remix ==
"All I Do Is Win (Remix)"

Promotional single by DJ Khaled featuring T-Pain, Diddy, Nicki Minaj, Rick Ross, Busta Rhymes, Fabolous, Jadakiss, Fat Joe and Swizz Beatz
- Released: June 8, 2010
- Recorded: 2009–2010
- Genre: Hip-hop
- Length: 5:20
- Label: We the Best; Terror Squad; E1
- Songwriters: Khaled Khaled; Faheem Najm; Sean Combs; Onika Maraj; William Roberts; Trevor Smith; John Jackson; Jason Phillips; Joseph Cartagena; Kasseem Dean
- Producers: DJ Nasty; LVM; Birdman

On April 28, 2010, the official remix was released. It features Rick Ross, Busta Rhymes, Diddy, Nicki Minaj, Fabolous, Jadakiss, Fat Joe, Swizz Beatz on background vocals, and T-Pain. Jadakiss' verse is a sample from "Allergic to Losing", a song from his 2010 mixtape The Champ Is Here, Pt. 3. The remix was released as a digital single on iTunes on June 8, 2010. A music video has been shot and was released on June 29, 2010. DJ Khaled also raps a verse on the remix.

There is another remix titled "Hood Remix" or "G-Mix" which is by Nappy Boy artist Young Cash. The remix features a new rap line up, Yo Gotti, Gudda Gudda, Bun B, Ice Berg, 2 Chainz, T-Pain, and Field Mob. On this version, instead of T-Pain on the chorus, Young Cash is, while T-Pain delivers a verse of his own.

== In popular culture ==
The song was used shortly after its release in an Arkansas Razorbacks hype video in 2010 where it gained popularity as a sports anthem.

Late MMA fighter Kimbo Slice used the song as his walkout theme for his fight against Matt Mitrione at UFC 113 on May 8, 2010, at the time of the song's popularity. Ironically, however, Slice would lose by technical knockout in the 2nd round.

The song has become an anthem for numerous sports teams. The New York Knicks professional basketball team used an instrumental version of the song for their player intros during the 2010–11 NBA season.

The song has gained popularity among Miami Hurricanes football fans as Snoop Dogg's line "We like the U in the '80s" refers to the University of Miami football team that dominated college football in the 1980s and early 1990s. It was subsequently arranged for the Band of the Hour, Miami's marching band. Internet mashup artist DJ Earworm has included the song in a mash-up designed for the 2012 Summer Olympics.

A remix version was made in December 2011 for Tim Tebow of the Denver Broncos, called "All He Does Is Win" – the video went viral on YouTube.

At the 2013 White House Correspondents' Dinner, President Barack Obama was introduced to "Hail to the Chief", which quickly cut to a snippet of "All I Do Is Win".

On April 28, 2014, actress Emma Stone lip synched the song in a "Lip Sync Battle" against late-night talk show host Jimmy Fallon.

The song is featured in the soundtrack of basketball video game NBA 2K16.

The YouTube channel Baracksdubs created and uploaded a mashup video of U.S. President Donald Trump singing the song.

It has also been featured in episodes of series including Superstore, Black-ish, and The Big Bang Theory, American Housewife, and films including The Peanuts Movie, Magic Mike XXL, Scoob!, and Charlie's Angels, and The Fall Guy (2024).

The remix was used in the episode of the 2017 version of the 1980s animated series DuckTales ("The 87 Cent Solution"), during the scene in which Flintheart Glomgold barged uninvited into Scrooge McDuck's funeral and made an irreverent spectacle of himself by dancing to the song in a glittery tuxedo.

== Chart performance ==
"All I Do Is Win" debuted at number 63 on the US Billboard Hot 100 chart date of March 6, 2010, and peaked at this chart at number 24 for the chart dated July 24, 2010. The song also peaked at number eight on US Hot R&B/Hip-Hop Songs in 2010. In May 2014, the song re-entered the Hot R&B/Hip-Hop Songs chart at number 23. On June 19, 2015, the single was certified triple platinum by the Recording Industry Association of America (RIAA) for sales of over three million copies in the United States.

The song debuted on the Canadian Hot 100 chart at number 69 for the chart date of March 6, 2010.

== Charts ==
=== Weekly charts ===
Chart (2010–2014)	Peak position
Canada Hot 100 (Billboard)	69
Germany Urban (DBC)	9
UK Singles (Official Charts)	98
UK Hip Hop/R&B (Official Charts)	20
US Billboard Hot 100	24
US Hot R&B/Hip-Hop Songs (Billboard)	8
US Hot Rap Songs (Billboard)	6
US Rhythmic Airplay (Billboard)	21

=== Year-end charts ===
Chart (2010)	Position
Germany Urban (DBC)	111
US Billboard Hot 100	79
US Hot R&B/Hip-Hop Songs (Billboard)	41

== Certifications ==
Region	Certification	Certified units/sales
Canada (Music Canada)	Platinum	80,000^{*}
New Zealand (RMNZ)	Platinum	30,000^{‡}
United Kingdom (BPI)	Gold	400,000^{‡}
United States (RIAA)	3× Platinum	3,000,000^{‡}
^{*} Sales figures based on certification alone.^{‡} Sales+streaming figures based on certification alone.
