= Crash the Party =

Studio album by Smilez & Southstar
- Released: July 23, 2002
- Recorded: 2002
- Genres: Southern hip hop; pop-rap
- Length: 57:59
- Labels: Trans Continental Records; ARTISTdirect Records; Bertelsmann Music Group
- Producers: Lou Pearlman (exec.); Dakari (also exec.); DJ Nasty & LVM

Singles from Crash the Party
- 1. "Who Wants This?" Released: May 21, 2002; 2. "Tell Me" Released: October 22, 2002

Professional ratings
Review scores
Source	Rating
AllMusic	3/5 stars
RapReviews	7.5/10

Crash the Party is the only studio album by American hip hop duo Smilez & Southstar. It was released on July 23, 2002 via Artistdirect. Production was handled primarily by Dakari, with one track produced by DJ Nasty & LVM. The album peaked at number 91 on the Billboard 200 and at number 24 on the Top R&B/Hip-Hop Albums.

== Track listing ==
No.	Title	Length
1.	"Intro" (Skit)	0:47
2.	"Let's Roll"	4:03
3.	"Who Wants This?"	4:27
4.	"Ridiculous"	4:00
5.	"Bull Shittin'" (Skit)	0:11
6.	"It's On"	4:33
7.	"Luv-A-Bo" (Skit)	0:34
8.	"Let's Get Naked"	4:07
9.	"R&B South" (Skit)	0:08
10.	"Tell Me"	4:38
11.	"What Can I Do?"	3:58
12.	"Gully"	4:18
13.	"On the List" (Skit)	1:25
14.	"Crash the Party"	3:55
15.	"Alright"	3:48
16.	"It's Time"	4:03
17.	"Now That You're Gone"	9:03
Total length:		57:59

Notes

- There is a hidden track at the end of the album named "Orlando". The final track "Now That You're Gone" is only 4 minutes and 37 seconds long. There is then a 9-second silence followed by the track "Orlando" for the remaining 4 minutes and 17 seconds.

== Charts ==
=== Weekly charts ===
Chart (2002–03)	Peak position
US Billboard 200	91
US Top R&B/Hip-Hop Albums (Billboard)	24

=== Year-end charts ===
Chart (2003)	Position
US Top R&B/Hip-Hop Albums (Billboard)	89
