= Tell Me (Smilez & Southstar song) =

Single by Smilez & Southstar

Single by Smilez & Southstar

from the album Crash the Party
- Released: October 22, 2002
- Genre: Hip hop, pop rap
- Length: 4:38
- Label: Trans Continental
- Songwriters: Rodney "Smilez" Bailey; Rob "Southstar" Campman; Johnny David Mollings; Leonardo V. Mollings
- Producer: DJ Nasty & LVM

"Tell Me" is a song written and performed by American hip hop duo Smilez & Southstar featuring uncredited vocals by Billy Lawrence for their studio album Crash the Party. "Tell Me" was released in 2002 as the album's second single to decent success and heavy airplay. To date, "Tell Me" is Smilez and Southstar's only and most successful single, earning the descriptor of "one-hit wonder." The song reached number 100 on Complex's list of the 100 best hip-hop one-hit wonders. The song's instrumental is based on a sample from the song "Stop, Look, Listen (To Your Heart)" performed by Diana Ross and Marvin Gaye. The music video was directed by Gregory Dark.

== Charts ==
Chart (2003)	Peak position
US Billboard Hot 100	28
US Hot R&B/Hip-Hop Songs (Billboard)	28
US Hot Rap Songs (Billboard)	10
