= The Leak =

EP by Lil Wayne
- Released: December 25, 2007
- Recorded: 2007
- Genre: Southern hip-hop
- Length: 19:29
- Labels: Cash Money; Universal Motown

Lil Wayne chronology
Da Drought 3 (2007)	The Leak (2007)	Tha Carter III (2008)

Singles from The Leak
- 1. "Gossip" Released: December 18, 2007; 2. "I'm Me" Released: December 24, 2007

Professional ratings
Review scores
Source	Rating
DJBooth	3.5/5 stars
Pitchfork	(7.7/10)
Rhapsody	(favorable)

The Leak is the first extended play (EP) by American rapper Lil Wayne. It was released on December 25, 2007, under Cash Money Records and Universal Motown Records. The five songs on the EP were recorded by Lil Wayne during Tha Carter III sessions. The songs were ultimately leaked online by an unknown source; Wayne later compiled the songs and called the project The Leak. Lil Wayne decided to put out The Leak for his fans so that they could have CD-quality versions of the songs. The EP was later used as a bonus disc for the deluxe edition of Tha Carter III (2008).

== Track listing ==
Track information sourced from Rhapsody.

No.	Title	Writer(s)	Producer(s)	Length
1.	"I'm Me"	Dwayne Carter; Lenny Mollings; Johnny Mollings	DJ Nasty & LVM	4:55
2.	"Gossip"	Carter; Nicholas Warwar; Lamont Dozier; Brian Holland; Eddie Holland	Streetrunner	3:25
3.	"Kush"	Carter; Vaushaun Brooks; Linda Lou McCall; Louis McCall; Danny Thomas	Maestro	3:42
4.	"Love Me or Hate Me"	Carter; David Kirkwood	GX	4:00
5.	"Talkin' About It"	Carter; Marco Rodriguez; Bigram Zayas	Infamous; Develop	3:31
Total length:				19:29

Sample credits

- "Gossip" contains a sample of "Stop! In the Name of Love"; performed by Margie Joseph; written by Lamont Dozier, Brian Holland, and Eddie Holland.
- "Kush" contains samples from the composition "Honey Wild", written by Linda Lou McCall, Louis McCall, and Danny Thomas.
