= Listennn... the Album =

Studio album by DJ Khaled
- Released: June 6, 2006
- Recorded: May 2005 – May 2006
- Studio: North Miami, Florida, Dade, Carol City, Atlanta
- Genre: Hip-hop
- Length: 66:31
- Label: Terror Squad; Koch
- Producer: DJ Khaled; Cool & Dre; Diaz Brothers; DJ Nasty & LVM

DJ Khaled chronology
Listennn... the Album (2006)	We the Best (2007)

Singles from Listennn... The Album
- 1. "Holla at Me" Released: February 28, 2006; 2. "Grammy Family" Released: July 1, 2006; 3. "Born-N-Raised" Released: September 24, 2006

Listennn... the Album is the debut studio album by American disc jockey and record producer DJ Khaled. It was released on June 6, 2006, by Terror Squad Entertainment and Koch Records. The album also features guest appearances from Fat Joe, Young Jeezy, Kanye West, Bun B, Trick Daddy, Rick Ross, Lil Wayne, Birdman, Juelz Santana, Slim Thug, Krayzie Bone, Chamillionaire, Trina, Twista, Freeway, T.I., John Legend, Akon, Jadakiss, Beanie Sigel, Styles P, Cool & Dre, Paul Wall, Pitbull, Clipse, and Lil Scrappy, among others. Reviews for the record were generally positive, but divided over the production, lyrical content and Khaled as an artist. Listennn... the Album debuted at number 12 on the Billboard 200, selling 44,000 copies in its first week in the United States. The album was supported by three singles: "Holla at Me" (featuring Lil Wayne, Paul Wall, Fat Joe, Rick Ross, and Pitbull), "Grammy Family" (featuring Kanye West, John Legend, and Consequence), and "Born-N-Raised" (featuring Pitbull, Trick Daddy, and Rick Ross).

== Singles ==
The album's lead single, called "Holla at Me" was released on February 28, 2006. The song features guest appearances from Lil Wayne, Paul Wall, Fat Joe, Rick Ross, and Pitbull, with the production by Cool & Dre. The song peaked at number 59 on the US Billboard Hot 100.

The album's second single, "Grammy Family" was released on July 1, 2006. The song features guest appearances from both American rappers Kanye West and Consequence, alongside American singer-songwriter John Legend, while West himself also produced the track as well, alongside Jon Brion.

The album's third single, "Born-N-Raised" was released on September 24, 2006. The song features guest appearances from Pitbull and Rick Ross (whom both previously featured on "Holla at Me"), alongside fellow American rapper Trick Daddy, with the production by The Runners. The song also included on Pitbull's second studio album, El Mariel (2006).

== Reception ==
=== Critical reception ===
Professional ratings
Review scores
Source	Rating
AllMusic	4/5 stars
HipHopDX	2.5/5 stars
PopMatters	8/10 stars
RapReviews	6/10
Vibe	3.5/5 stars
XXL	3/5 stars

Upon its release, the album received a generally positive reception from music critics. AllMusic's David Jeffries praised Khaled for crafting an album that's diverse in its production geography-wise and for bringing out great performances from his artists. A.L. Friedman of PopMatters also praised Khaled for bringing in an all-star cast of artists and producers, signaling out "Born-N-Raised" and "Gangsta Shit" as the album's highlights. Vibe contributor Damien Scott felt that Khaled "masterfully balances hometown pride with outer regional influences", highlighting "Holla at Me", "Problem" and "Candy Paint" for their production and lyricism, concluding that "[T]his compilation makes a solid sonic case for why it deserves to be heard." Steve 'Flash' Juon of RapReviews gave a mixed review of the record, saying it was competent and has a few standout tracks but that it didn't reveal much about Khaled besides the fact that he has many connections and shows pride in representing Miami. Andres Tardio of HipHopDX gave credit to the catchy production, but felt it was let down by the weak lyricism delivered by almost every artist throughout the record, concluding that "If nothing else, this album shows off Khaled's connections, but it does little justice to Khaled's talent."

=== Commercial performance ===
The album debuted at number 12 on the US Billboard 200, selling 44,000 copies in its first week. To date, the album has since sold 230,000 copies in the United States.

== Track listing ==
Credits adapted from BMI and ASCAP.

No.	Title	Writer(s)	Producer	Length
1.	"Intro"	Khaled Khaled	Khaled	1:59
2.	"Born-N-Raised" (featuring Pitbull, Trick Daddy, and Rick Ross)	Khaled; Armando Pérez; Maurice Young; William Roberts II; Andrew Harr; Johnny Mollings; Leonardo Mollings	The Runners; Nasty Beatmakers	4:16
3.	"Gangsta Shit" (featuring Young Jeezy, Bun B, Slick Pulla, and Bloodraw)	Khaled; Jay "Young Jeezy" Jenkins; Bernard Freeman; Renaldo "Slick Pulla" Whitman; Bruce "Bloodraw" Falson; Mollings; Mollings	Nasty Beatmakers; Khaled	4:59
4.	"Grammy Family" (featuring Kanye West, Consequence, and John Legend)	Khaled; Kanye West; Dexter Mills, Jr.; John Stephens	Kanye West; Jon Brion	3:24
5.	"Problem" (featuring Beanie Sigel and Jadakiss)	Khaled; Dwight Grant; Jason Phillips	Khaled	3:36
6.	"Holla at Me" (featuring Lil Wayne, Paul Wall, Fat Joe, Rick Ross, and Pitbull)	Khaled; Perez; Arthur Baker; John Robie; Afrika Bambaataa; Robert Allen; John Miller; Ellis Williams	Cool & Dre; Khaled	4:27
7.	"Addicted" (featuring Juelz Santana)	Khaled; Laron James	STREETRUNNER; Khaled	3:45
8.	"Watch Out" (featuring Akon, Styles P, Fat Joe, and Rick Ross)	Khaled; Aliaume Thiam; David Styles; Joseph Cartagena; Roberts; Andre Lyon; Marcello Valenzano	Cool & Dre; Khaled	3:45
9.	"Destroy You" (featuring Twista and Bone Thugs-n-Harmony)	Khaled; Anthony Henderson; Carl Mitchell; Steven Howse; Byron McCane II; Charles Scruggs	Cool & Dre; Khaled	4:27
10.	"Never Be Nothing Like Me" (featurting Lil Scrappy and Homeboy)	Khaled; Darryl Richardson; Michael Crooms	Mr. Collipark; Khaled	4:22
11.	"Candy Paint" (featuring Slim Thug, Chamillionaire, and Trina)	Khaled; Katrina Taylor; Hakeem Seriki; Lyon; Valenzano	Cool & Dre; Khaled	4:10
12.	"MIA" (featuring Lil Wayne)	Khaled; Dwayne Carter, Jr.; Bigram Zayas	DVLP	3:45
13.	"Where You At" (featuring Freeway and Clipse)	Khaled; Lesile Pridgen; Gene Thornton, Jr.; Terrance Thornton	Khaled	3:52
14.	"Still Fly" (featuring Birdman and CHOPS)	Khaled; Cartagena; Phillips; Jeffrey "Ja Rule" Atkins; Lyon; Valenzano	T-Mix; Khaled	5:10
15.	"Dip Slide Ride Out" (featuring T.I., Young Dro, and Big Kuntry)	Khaled	Keith McMasters	5:00
16.	"Movement" (featuring Dre)	Khaled; Lyon	Cool & Dre; Khaled	3:42
17.	"The Future of Dade" (featuring Brisco, Dirt E Red, Dela, Lunch Money, Co, Hennessy, and P.M.)	Khaled; British Mitchell; Kevyn Carter; Luis Diaz; Hugo Diaz	Diaz Brothers; Khaled	5:37
Total length:				66:31

== Personnel ==
- DJ Khaled – production (all tracks)
- DJ Nasty & LVM – production (track 3)
- Cool & Dre – production (tracks 8, 11, 16)
- Diaz Brothers – production (track 17)

== Charts ==
Chart (2006)	Peak position
US Billboard 200	12
US Top R&B/Hip-Hop Albums (Billboard)	3
