= Push It (Rick Ross song) =

Single by Rick Ross

from the album Port of Miami
- Released: May 17, 2006
- Recorded: 2005
- Genre: Southern hip hop; mafioso rap; gangsta rap
- Length: 3:31
- Label: Slip-n-Slide; Def Jam; Poe Boy
- Songwriters: Pete Bellotte; Giorgio Moroder; J. R. Rotem; William Roberts II
- Producer: J. R. Rotem

Rick Ross singles chronology
"Hustlin'" (2006)	"Push It" (2006)	"Born-N-Raised" (2006)

"Push It" is the second single from rapper Rick Ross' debut album Port of Miami. It samples "Scarface (Push It to the Limit)" (keeping with the theme of the album) and the story of the video (directed by Benny Boom) has a very similar theme to the movie Scarface. It was produced by J. R. Rotem.

DJ Khaled, Brisco, E-Class and Triple C’s all made cameo appearances in the video.

The official remix to this song features Bun B, Jadakiss, Styles P. and The Game, which samples "Scarface (Push It to the Limit)" more heavily than the original. A remix was released with Miami rapper Trina and Plies. There were also remixes released by Sean Kingston, and one by Trey Songz. There was a freestyle over the same beat released by Harlem rappers Cam'Ron and Vado. The song was also featured on "The Big Game", the 36th episode of Criminal Minds.

== Charts ==
=== Weekly charts ===
Chart (2006)	Peak position
US Billboard Hot 100	57
US Hot R&B/Hip-Hop Songs (Billboard)	15
US Hot Rap Songs (Billboard)	10
US Pop 100 (Billboard)	95
US Rhythmic Airplay (Billboard)	32

=== Year-end charts ===
Chart (2006)	Position
US Hot R&B/Hip-Hop Songs (Billboard)	87

== Certifications ==
Region	Certification	Certified units/sales
United States (RIAA)	Gold	500,000^{‡}
^{‡} Sales+streaming figures based on certification alone.
