= Trilla =

Studio album by Rick Ross
- Released: March 11, 2008
- Recorded: 2007–08
- Genre: Hip-hop
- Length: 55:45
- Labels: Poe Boy; Slip-n-Slide; Def Jam
- Producers: Ted "Touche" Lucas (exec.); Rick Ross (exec.); Shawn "The Carter Administration" Carter (exec.); E-Class (co-exec.); Shakir Stewart (co-exec.); Kevin "Coach K" Lee (co-exec.); Bink!; Blac Elvis; Cool & Dre; DJ Nasty & LVM; DJ Toomp; Drumma Boy; J.R. Rotem; J.U.S.T.I.C.E. League; Jim Jonsin; J Rock; Kane Beatz; Los Vegaz; LT Moe; Mannie Fresh; Scott Storch; Tha Bizness; The Runners

Rick Ross chronology
Port of Miami (2006)	Trilla (2008)	Deeper Than Rap (2009)

Singles from Trilla
- 1. "Speedin' " Released: October 16, 2007; 2. "The Boss" Released: February 12, 2008; 3. "Here I Am" Released: March 25, 2008; 4. "This Is the Life" Released: August 30, 2008

Trilla is the second studio album by American rapper Rick Ross. It was released on March 11, 2008, by Poe Boy Entertainment, Slip-n-Slide Records and Def Jam Recordings. It features guest appearances from R. Kelly, T-Pain, Trey Songz, Young Jeezy, Trick Daddy, Nelly, Brisco, Triple C's, Jay-Z, Lil Wayne and Avery Storm.

== Background ==
On August 17, 2007, Rick Ross announced that the album would be released on November 11, 2007. However, he later announced that the album would be released on December 18, 2007, until it was pushed back to February 19, 2008. In November 2007, in an interview with HipHopDX, Rick Ross spoke about who would be featured on the album, saying: "Most definitely. I wanted to step everything up. That’s why I reached out to R. Kelly for the first single. I got Marsha from Floetry to come in and help get the females on my team. She did a lot of work with Michael Jackson. When I was working with her, I thought about that. We laughed, we chopped it up, we just had fun. We put together some real big records. This album is going to be much better than Port of Miami and possibly the best album of the year."

In March 2008, in an interview with AllHipHop, he spoke about where the album title came from, saying: "Trill is a term we been using down south. I'm sure you heard Bun B use it. Pimp C been saying that since forever. You know in the Texas/Florida panhandle, that's what we say. And I just put my twist and my spin on it. I kind of took a little from Michael Jackson's Thriller album and put that on mines and that's how we came up with Trilla. Shout out to Bun B. That's my uncle in the game."

== Singles ==
On October 16, 2007, the album's lead single, "Speedin'" featuring R. Kelly, was released. On December 14, 2007, the music video was released for "Speedin'" featuring R. Kelly. On February 14, 2008, the album's second single, "The Boss" featuring T-Pain, was released. On February 21, 2008, the music video was released for "The Boss" featuring T-Pain. On March 25, 2008, the album's third single, "Here I Am" featuring Nelly and Avery Storm, was released. On May 23, 2008, the music video was released for "Here I Am" featuring Nelly and Avery Storm.

== Critical reception ==
Professional ratings
Aggregate scores
Source	Rating
Metacritic	60/100
Review scores
Source	Rating
AllMusic	3/5 stars
Entertainment Weekly	B+
HipHopDX	3.5/5 stars
IGN	6.2/10
Pitchfork	2.4/10
PopMatters	7/10 stars
RapReviews	8/10
Rolling Stone	3/5 stars
Slant Magazine	3/5 stars
USA Today	3/4 stars

Trilla was met with generally mixed reviews from music critics. At Metacritic, which assigns a normalized rating out of 100 to reviews from critics, the album received an average score of 60, which indicates "mixed or average reviews ", based on 12 reviews. David Jeffries of AllMusic said, "The huge guest list is also a plus since Ross would have a hard time carrying this album on his own, but when surrounded by talent he pushes a little harder and comes up with a handful of rhymes that aren't tired or clichéd." Simon Vozick-Levinson of Entertainment Weekly stated, "Miami's Rick Ross generally gets by on his blustery baritone rather than on lyrical wizardry. Nothing wrong with that: As his second full-length reminds us, his imposing voice sounds pretty good over big-budget synths and even better over buttery soul strings and horns." Alexander J. Azizi of HipHopDX said, "Blending a somewhat diverse mix of hot producers who are all at the top of their game, and well chosen quality guest appearances is evidently a mold of success for The Boss. Top that off with a flow that seems to improve continuously and you've got Trilla. Although the album has its downsides with some unremarkable songs, the quality of the album musically and lyrically definitely makes up for it. If you dug Port Of Miami you will for sure be pleased with this album and the progress that Rick Ross has made."

Todd Gilchrist of IGN stated, "Overall, Trilla is not an album destined for longevity or critical acclaim, but there's no doubt that at least a few hits will be mined from its tracks, and Ross' star will continue to rise among the ranks of radio-ready gangsta rappers." Jordan Sargent of PopMatters said, "It's all very calculated, and some would say empty, but albums that are good because the rappers do just enough not to ruin a great collection of beats and guests verses is not a foreign concept to us. Why Trilla especially is catching so much shit for it, I'm not sure. I mean, we all heard American Gangster, right?" Wilson McBee of Slant Magazine stated, "If Ross spouts myriad clunkers, his cadence is at least smooth and his voice cushiony, and so if it's possible to ignore the rapper and focus on the production, Trilla becomes an enjoyable listen." Evan McGarvey of Pitchfork said, "Trilla, Rick Ross's inexplicable second album, is every bit a fatty contemporary American disaster." Steve 'Flash' Juon of RapReviews stated, "I suspect as Ross continues to evolve as a lyricist there will be even more of a message in his music, but in the meantime the production and guest stars on Trilla make for an effective album that shows Ross has yet to tap into his full potential."

== Commercial performance ==
Trilla debuted at number one on the US Billboard 200, with first-week sales of 198,000 copies. In its second week, the album dropped to number three on the chart, selling 90,000 copies. In its third week, the album dropped to number six on the chart, selling 51,000 copies that week. On May 8, 2008, the album was certified gold by the Recording Industry Association of America (RIAA) for sales of over 500,000 copies in the United States.

== Track listing ==
Credits adapted from the album's liner notes.

No.	Title	Writer(s)	Producer(s)	Length
1.	"Trilla Intro"	William Roberts; Kevin Crowe; Erik Ortiz	J.U.S.T.I.C.E. League	2:54
2.	"All I Have In This World (Japanese Denim)" (featuring Mannie Fresh)	Roberts; Byron Thomas; Brad Jordan; William Dennis; John Okuribido	Mannie Fresh	4:02
3.	"The Boss" (featuring T-Pain)	Roberts; Jonathan Rotem; Faheem Najm	J.R. Rotem	3:45
4.	"Speedin'" (featuring R. Kelly)	Roberts; Andrew Harr; Jermaine Jackson; Kevin Cossom; Robert Kelly	The Runners	3:24
5.	"We Shinin'"	Roberts; Roosevelt Harrell; Ron E. Beck; Victor Conte; Steve Cropper; Chester D. Thompson	Bink!	3:56
6.	"Money Make Me Come" (featuring EbonyLove)	Roberts; Christopher Gholson	Drumma Boy	3:31
7.	"DJ Khaled Interlude" (featuring DJ Khaled)	Roberts	DJ Khaled	1:28
8.	"This Is the Life" (featuring Trey Songz)	Roberts; Elvis Williams; Jaime Newman	Blac Elvis	4:25
9.	"This Me"	Roberts; Aldrin Davis; Kanye West	DJ Toomp	3:47
10.	"Here I Am" (featuring Nelly & Avery Storm)	Roberts; Gholson; Cornell Haynes; Ralph Di Stasio	Drumma Boy	3:29
11.	"Maybach Music" (featuring Jay-Z)	Roberts; Crowe; Ortiz; Shawn Carter	J.U.S.T.I.C.E. League	4:08
12.	"Billionaire"	Roberts; Crowe; Ortiz	J.U.S.T.I.C.E. League	4:12
13.	"Luxury Tax" (featuring Trick Daddy, Young Jeezy & Lil Wayne)	Roberts; Crowe; Ortiz; Dwayne Carter; Jay Jenkins; Maurice Young; Michael Gradney; David Oliver	J.U.S.T.I.C.E. League	4:43
14.	"Reppin' My City" (featuring Triple C's & Brisco)	Roberts; Jean Borges; Richard Morales; Kevin Belnavis; British Mitchell; Joseph Cartagena; Dwayne Carter; Scott Storch	J Rock	4:17
15.	"I'm Only Human" (featuring Rodney)	Roberts; Leonardo Mollings; Johnny Mollings; Rodney Kohn; James Harris III; Terry Lewis	DJ Nasty & LVM	3:37
Total length:				55:45

iTunes Store bonus track
No.	Title	Writer(s)	Producer(s)	Length
16.	"Ridin' Thru the Ghetto"	Roberts; Carlos Thornton; Morales; Belnavis	Los Vegaz	5:03

Best Buy bonus track
No.	Title	Writer(s)	Producer(s)	Length
16.	"Street Money" (featuring Flo Rida)	Roberts; Borges; Tramar Dillard	J Rock	4:11

== Charts ==
=== Weekly charts ===
Chart (2008)	Peak position
Canadian Albums (Billboard)	14
US Billboard 200	1
US Top R&B/Hip-Hop Albums (Billboard)	1
US Top Rap Albums (Billboard)	1

=== Year-end charts ===
Chart (2008)	Position
US Billboard 200	50
US Top R&B/Hip-Hop Albums (Billboard)	8
US Top Rap Albums (Billboard)	3

== Certifications ==
Region	Certification	Certified units/sales
United States (RIAA)	Gold	500,000^{^}
^{^} Shipments figures based on certification alone.

== See also ==
- List of Billboard 200 number-one albums of 2008
- List of Billboard number-one R&B albums of 2008
- List of number-one rap albums of 2008 (U.S.)
