= I'm Me =

Single by Lil Wayne

from the album The Leak
- Released: December 24, 2007
- Recorded: 2007
- Genre: Hip hop
- Length: 4:55
- Label: Cash Money
- Songwriter: Dwayne Carter
- Producer: DJ Nasty & LVM

Lil Wayne singles chronology
| "Gossip" (2007) | "I'm Me" (2007) | "Push" (2008) |

"I'm Me" is a song by American rapper Lil Wayne, released on December 24, 2007, as the second single from his first extended play The Leak.

== Background ==
The song was originally titled "1000 Degreez", and was initially intended to be the opening track on Wayne’s then-upcoming album Tha Carter III (2008); however, after the song was leaked online, it was removed from the album‘s final track listing, and instead issued on The Leak, along with four other leaked songs from the album. It was later included as a bonus track on the bonus disc version of Tha Carter III, with the tracks from The Leak comprising the bonus disc. Lil Wayne referenced the song on his song "3 Peat", the eventual intro track from Tha Carter III which replaced "I'm Me".

== Composition ==
The song was produced by American production duo DJ Nasty & LVM. The track contains vocal samples of Lil Wayne's previous songs "Go DJ", "Fireman", "Hustler Musik", and "Cash Money Millionaires". The song also contains samples of American rapper T.I.'s "Rubber Band Man". The instrumentals are sampled from "God Moving Over the Face of the Waters" by Moby.

== In popular culture ==
Professional wrestler Bobby Lashley has also used the song as entrance music for his MMA and professional wrestling bouts.

UFC fighter Mike Perry used this song for his entrance theme at UFC on FOX 26 when facing Santiago Ponzinibbio

== Charts ==
| Chart (2008) | Peak position |
|---|---|
| US Billboard Hot 100 | 97 |
| US Hot R&B/Hip-Hop Songs (Billboard) | 63 |
| US Pop 100 (Billboard) | 70 |
