= Put Your Hands Up (DJ Khaled song) =

Single by DJ Khaled featuring Young Jeezy, Plies, Rick Ross and Schife

from the album Victory
- Released: February 8, 2010
- Recorded: 2009
- Genre: Hip hop
- Length: 4:15 (single version); 5:12 (album version)
- Label: We the Best; Terror Squad; E1
- Songwriters: Khaled Khaled; Jay Jenkins; Algernod Washington; William Roberts II; Ian Lewis
- Producer: Schife

DJ Khaled singles chronology
"Fed Up" (2009)	"Put Your Hands Up" (2010)	"All I Do Is Win" (2010)

Young Jeezy singles chronology
"Hard" (2009)	"Put Your Hands Up" (2010)	"(Ha Ha) Slow Down" (2010)

Plies singles chronology
"Hey Daddy (Daddy's Home)" (2009)	"Put Your Hands Up" (2010)	"She Got It Made" (2010)

Rick Ross singles chronology
"Fed Up" (2009)	"Put Your Hands Up" (2010)	"All I Do Is Win" (2010)

Schife singles chronology
"Go" (2009)	"Put Your Hands Up" (2010)

"Put Your Hands Up" is the second single from the American rapper DJ Khaled’s fourth album Victory. The track features Young Jeezy, Plies, Rick Ross and Schife. It was officially released on February 8, 2010, along with "All I Do Is Win". The album version features an additional verse by Plies after Young Jeezy's part, which is the official remix.

== Music video ==
The video has a spinning camera filming Young Jeezy, Rick Ross and Schife rapping their parts, in the middle of a big circle of people. Fat Joe and Ace Hood make cameos in the music video. Plies does not appear in this video. The video premiered on BET's 106 & Park on March 3, 2010- along with the music video for "All I Do Is Win".

== Charts ==
Chart (2010)	Peak Position
U.S. Billboard Bubbling Under R&B/Hip-Hop Singles	2
