= Champion (Ace Hood song) =

Single by Ace Hood featuring Jazmine Sullivan and Rick Ross

from the album Ruthless
- Released: June 16, 2009
- Recorded: 2009
- Genre: Hip hop
- Label: We the Best, Def Jam
- Songwriters: McColister, Harr, Jackson, Carvin Haggins, Ivan Barias, Jazmine Sullivan, Roberts II
- Producer: The Runners

Ace Hood singles chronology
"Overtime" (2009)	"Champion" (2009)	"Hustle Hard" (2011)

Jazmine Sullivan singles chronology
"Dream Big" (2009)	"Champion" (2009)	"World Tour" (2009)

Rick Ross singles chronology
"Maybach Music 2" (2009)	"Champion" (2009)	"Fed Up" (2009)

"Champion" is the official second single from Ace Hood's second album, Ruthless. It is a hip hop song that features Jazmine Sullivan and Rick Ross.

== Music video ==
Gil Green, DJ Khaled, The Runners, and Dre make cameo appearances in the video.

== Charts ==
Chart (2009)	Peak position
US Hot R&B/Hip-Hop Songs (Billboard)	58

== Release history ==
Country	Date	Format	Label
United States	June 8, 2009	Urban contemporary radio	We the Best Music Group, Def Jam Recordings
Romania	June 22, 2009	Digital download	The Island Def Jam Music Group
