= Go Hard (DJ Khaled song) =

Single by DJ Khaled featuring Kanye West and T-Pain

from the album We Global
- Released: September 16, 2008
- Recorded: 2008
- Genre: Hip-hop
- Length: 4:32
- Label: We the Best; Terror Squad; Koch
- Songwriters: Khaled Khaled; Faheem Najm; Kanye West; Madonna Ciccone; Stephen Bray
- Producer: The Runners

DJ Khaled singles chronology
"Out Here Grindin" (2008)	"Go Hard" (2008)	"Fed Up" (2009)

Kanye West singles chronology
"Heartless" (2008)	"Go Hard" (2008)	"Amazing" (2009)

T-Pain singles chronology
"One More Drink" (2008)	"Go Hard" (2008)	"Boom" (2009)

"Go Hard" is the second single from the American rapper DJ Khaled's third album, We Global. The hip-hop track features Kanye West and T-Pain and their trademark auto-tune effect. The song is produced by the Runners and it samples Madonna's 1985 song "Angel". It first charted on the Bubbling Under R&B/Hip Hop chart on December 4, 2008, debuting at number 25, where it peaked at number 15, and it charted on the Hot R&B/Hip-Hop Songs debuting at number 85 and then rising to number 53. It also debuted at number 69 on the Billboard Hot 100 the same week the album We Global was released, and it hit number 19 on the Hot Rap Tracks chart.

== Music video ==
The official video (directed by Hype Williams) was released on November 7. The low budget music video features cameos from Ace Hood, Rick Ross, Tyson Beckford, Tay Dizm and DJ Clue among others. The video for T-Pain's song "Karaoke" was shot on the same day.

== Remixes ==
There is a remix that adds a verse by Twista.

Jay-Z did a remix for his greatest hits compilation

Nicki Minaj did a remix of the song, titled Gotta Go Hard, on her mixtape Beam Me Up Scotty with a feature from Lil Wayne.

== Charts ==
Chart (2008)	Peak position
US Billboard Hot 100	69
US Hot R&B/Hip-Hop Songs (Billboard)	53
US Hot Rap Songs (Billboard)	19
