= Overtime (Ace Hood song) =

Single by Ace Hood featuring Akon and T-Pain

from the album Ruthless
- Released: May 19, 2009
- Recorded: 2009
- Genre: Hip hop
- Length: 4:08
- Label: We the Best, Def Jam
- Songwriter(s): Antoine McColister, Aliaune Thiam, Faheem Najm, Kevin Cossom
- Producer(s): The Runners

Ace Hood singles chronology
"Ride" (2008)	"Overtime" (2009)	"Champion" (2009)

Akon singles chronology
"Just Go" (2009)	"Overtime" (2009)	"All Up 2 You" (2009)

T-Pain singles chronology
"Sun Come Up" (2009)	"Overtime" (2009)	"Maybach Music 2" (2009)

"Overtime" is the first single from the American rapper Ace Hood's second studio album Ruthless. It features Senegalese-American singer-songwriter Akon and fellow American singer T-Pain, and is produced by The Runners.

== Music video ==
The music video was shot at Chaminade-Madonna College Preparatory School in Hollywood, Florida. The school's football field was chosen for the view, and because the team represents the struggle to go "overtime" in training. It was released on May 18, 2009. The video features cameos from Rick Ross, Birdman, The Runners, DJ Khaled, and Serena Williams. The video shows three teenagers struggling to overcome their goals. A girl is attempting to start on the high school football team despite the sexist treatment she gets from those around her, a boy is attempting to make varsity basketball despite being 5 feet 9 inches, and a boy attempting to get into Harvard despite it being so tough and mocking from his peers. In addition, Ace Hood is also struggling to be a rapper. In the end, the girl gets a touchdown and is praised by her team, the boy makes the varsity team, the other boy makes his way into Harvard and Ace Hood gets signed to DJ Khaled's "We the Best" Music Group.

== Charts ==
Chart (2009)	Peak position
US Bubbling Under Hot 100 (Billboard)	19
US Hot R&B/Hip-Hop Songs (Billboard)	70
