= Nasty Beatmakers =

American record production duo

- Origin: Orlando, Florida, United States
- Genres: Hip hop
- Occupation: Record production team
- Instruments: Yamaha Motif, Apple GarageBand, Akai MPC4000, Novation DrumStation, Roland MC-808
- Years active: 1999–present
- Label: We The Best
- Members: DJ Nasty; LVM

Nasty Beatmakers are an American record production duo, composed of brothers DJ Nasty (Johnny David Mollings) and LVM (Leonardo V. Mollings).

The duo produced Lil Wayne's "I'm Me", Plies's "#1 Fan", and Ludacris's "Grew Up a Screw Up".

== Early life and career beginnings ==
DJ Nasty and LVM were both born in Cuba, and came to the United States in 1988 due to their father being in the Navy; he "wanted a change in scenery", states Nasty. DJ Nasty early on met DJ Khaled and another associate named Ceaser and started Hitmen Productions. They were doing local house parties and renting out halls, and soon started to make a big name for themselves in Orlando, Florida. The group eventually broke up.

== Discography ==
Song	Year	Artist(s)	Album
"Thug Alwayz" (produced with Rater)	1999	Krayzie Bone featuring Bone Thugs-n-Harmony	Thug Mentality 1999
"The Wild Life"	2001	Fat Joe featuring Prospect and Xzibit	Jealous Ones Still Envy (J.O.S.E.)
"Smokin' Dro"	2002	Disturbing tha Peace featuring Tity Boi, I-20 and Ludacris	Golden Grain
"Tell Me"	2002	Smilez and Southstar	Crash the Party
"Southern Fried Intro"	2003	Ludacris	Chicken-n-Beer
"Hard Times"	2003	Ludacris featuring 8Ball & MJG and Carl Thomas	Chicken-n-Beer
"Leave Me Alone, Pt. 2"	2004	Cam'ron	Purple Haze
"Does Anybody Know" (produced with The Runners)	2005	Fat Joe	All or Nothing
"Murda Murda" (produced with The Runners)	2005	Juelz Santana featuring Cam'ron	What the Game's Been Missing!
"Money on My Mind" (produced with The Runners)	2005	Lil Wayne	Tha Carter II
"Over Here Hustlin'"	2006	Birdman & Lil Wayne	Like Father, Like Son
"Army Gunz"	2006	Lil Wayne	Like Father, Like Son
"Cali Dro"	2006	Birdman & Lil Wayne featuring Tha Dogg Pound	Like Father, Like Son
"Gangsta Shit" (produced with Midnight Black)	2006	DJ Khaled featuring Young Jeezy, Bun B, Slick Pulla and Blood Raw	Listennn... the Album
"Grew Up a Screw Up"	2006	Ludacris featuring Young Jeezy	Release Therapy
"Still On It" (produced with Midnight Black)	2006	Young Jeezy	The Inspiration
"Relax and Take Notes"	2007	8Ball & MJG featuring The Notorious B.I.G. and Project Pat	Ridin High
"S on My Chest" (produced with Kane Beatz)	2007	DJ Khaled featuring Lil Wayne and Birdman	We the Best
"I'm Me"	2007	Lil Wayne	The Leak
"Bullet"	2008	DJ Khaled featuring Rick Ross and Cham	We Global
"#1 Fan"	2008	Plies featuring Keyshia Cole and J. Holiday	Definition of Real
"I'm Only Human"	2008	Rick Ross featuring Rodney	Trilla
"Big Time"	2008	E-40 featuring Kevin Cossom	The Ball Street Journal
"Born an OG"	2009	Ace Hood featuring Ludacris	Ruthless
"All I Do Is Win"	2010	DJ Khaled featuring T-Pain, Ludacris, Snoop Dogg and Rick Ross	Victory
"All I Do Is Win (Remix)"	2010	DJ Khaled featuring T-Pain, Diddy, Nicki Minaj, Rick Ross, Busta Rhymes, Fabolous, Jadakiss, Fat Joe and Swizz Beatz	—N/a
"American Star"	2010	Lil Wayne featuring Shanell	Rebirth
"Welcome to My Hood" (produced with The Renegades, Cubic Z and DJ Khaled)	2011	DJ Khaled featuring Rick Ross, Plies and Lil Wayne	We the Best Forever
"Legendary" (produced with Gary Carolla and DJ Khaled)	2011	DJ Khaled featuring Chris Brown, Keyshia Cole and Ne-Yo	We the Best Forever
"Welcome to My Hood (Remix)" (produced with The Renegades and DJ Khaled)	2011	DJ Khaled featuring T-Pain, Ludacris, Busta Rhymes, Twista, Mavado, Birdman, Ace Hood, Game, Fat Joe, Jadakiss, Bun B and Waka Flocka Flame	We the Best Forever
"Ashes to Ashes"	2011	Kevin Cossom featuring Rick Ross	By Any Means
"Suffering From Success" (produced with Young Chop and DJ Khaled)	2013	DJ Khaled featuring Future and Ace Hood	Suffering from Success
"You Don't Want These Problems" (produced with DJ Khaled, Timbaland and Lee on the Beats)	2013	DJ Khaled featuring Big Sean, Rick Ross, French Montana, 2 Chainz, Meek Mill, Ace Hood and Timbaland	Suffering from Success
"Wild Thoughts" (produced with Party Next Door, and DJ Khaled)	2017	DJ Khaled featuring Rihanna and Bryson Tiller	Grateful
