= Speedin' =

Single by Rick Ross featuring R. Kelly

from the album Trilla
- Released: October 16, 2007
- Recorded: 2007
- Genre: Hip hop; R&B
- Length: 3:24
- Label: Slip-n-Slide; Def Jam; Poe Boy
- Songwriters: William Roberts; Robert Kelly; Andrew Harr; Jermaine Jackson; Kevin Cossom
- Producer: The Runners

Rick Ross singles chronology
"I'm So Hood" (2007)	"Speedin'" (2007)	"The Boss" (2008)

R. Kelly singles chronology
"Rock Star" (2007)	"Speedin'" (2007)	"All the Above" (2007)

"Speedin'" is a song performed by American rapper Rick Ross, released by Def Jam Recordings, Poe Boy Entertainment, and Slip-N-Slide Records on October 16, 2007 as the lead single from his second album Trilla (2008). The song features guest vocals from R&B singer R. Kelly, who co-wrote the song alongside Ross himself, Kevin Cossom, and its producers, the Runners.

Unlike Trilla's next two singles, "Speedin'" failed to enter the Billboard Hot 100.

== Remixes ==
- "Speedin' (We the Best Remix)" (Official Remix) (featuring R. Kelly, DJ Khaled, Plies, Birdman, Busta Rhymes, DJ Drama, Webbie, Gorilla Zoe, Fat Joe, Torch & Gunplay of Triple C's, DJ Bigga Rankin', Flo Rida, Brisco and Lil' Wayne)
- "Speedin' (Remix)" (featuring R. Kelly and Chris Brown)

== Music video ==
The music video features cameo appearances by DJ Khaled, Fat Joe, Gunplay, Trina and Diddy. DJ Khaled and Rick Ross are stopped by the police on a Miami bridge for speeding and are asked for license and registration, but instead, Rick Ross gets out of the car and jumps off the bridge. Rick Ross races Diddy and Fat Joe on the water on speed boats and R. Kelly on the road. At the end of the song, the officer is given a watch and tells Rick Ross and DJ Khaled to have a nice day and they drive off.

== Charts ==
Chart (2008)	Peak position
US Bubbling Under Hot 100 (Billboard)	21
US Hot R&B/Hip-Hop Songs (Billboard)	53
