= Smilez & Southstar =

American hip hop group

- Origin: Orlando, Florida, U.S.
- Genres: Southern hip hop
- Years active: 2002
- Labels: Trans Continential; ARTISTdirect; BMG
- Past members: Rodney "Smilez" Bailey; Rob "Southstar" Campman
- Website: Myspace

Smilez & Southstar was a hip-hop duo from Orlando, Florida made up of Rodney "Smilez" Bailey and Rob "Southstar" Campman. They were best known for their 2002 single "Tell Me", which peaked at number 28 on the Billboard Hot 100 and became their only song to achieve mainstream success.

== Discography ==
=== Studio albums ===
- Crash the Party (2002)

=== Singles ===
Year	Single	Chart Positions			Album
Year	Single	US Hot 100	US R&B	US Rap	Album
2002	"Who Wants This?"	—	65	—	Crash the Party
2002	"Tell Me"	28	28	10	Crash the Party
