= Victory (DJ Khaled album) =

Studio album by DJ Khaled
- Released: March 2, 2010
- Recorded: September 2009 – January 2010
- Studios: We The Best Studios, North Miami
- Genre: Hip-hop
- Length: 46:58
- Labels: We the Best; E1
- Producers: DJ Khaled (exec.); Cool & Dre; CP Hollywood; DJ Nasty & LVM; J. R. Rotem; J.U.S.T.I.C.E. League; Jim Jonsin; Kane Beatz; OhZee; Schife; Scott Storch; Tha Bizness; The Inkredibles; The Runners

DJ Khaled chronology
We Global (2008)	Victory (2010)	We the Best Forever (2011)

Singles from DJ Khaled
- 1. "Fed Up" Released: October 28, 2009; 2. "Put Your Hands Up" Released: February 8, 2010; 3. "All I Do Is Win" Released: February 8, 2010

Victory is the fourth studio album by American disc jockey and record producer DJ Khaled. It was released on March 2, 2010, by We the Best Music Group and E1 Music.

== Singles ==
The album's lead single, "Fed Up" featuring Usher, Young Jeezy, Rick Ross and Drake, was released on October 28, 2009. This song peaked at number 45 on the US Billboard Hot R&B/Hip Hop songs. The album version features an extra verse from rapper Lil Wayne. On December 3, 2009, the music video was released for "Fed Up" featuring Usher, Young Jeezy, Rick Ross and Drake.

The album's second single, "Put Your Hands Up" featuring Schife, Young Jeezy, Rick Ross and Plies, was released on February 8, 2010. On March 2, 2010, the music video was released for "Put Your Hands Up" featuring Schife, Young Jeezy, Rick Ross and Plies. Plies was not featured in the music video, and his part in the song skips over to Rick Ross.

The album's third single, "All I Do Is Win" featuring T-Pain, Ludacris, Rick Ross and Snoop Dogg, was released on February 8, 2010. The song peaked at number 24 on the US Billboard Hot 100, in which it became his most successful single at the time. On March 2, 2010, the music video was released for "All I Do Is Win" featuring T-Pain, Ludacris, Rick Ross and Snoop Dogg. On June 28, 2010, the music video was released for the "All I Do Is Win" (Remix) featuring T-Pain, Diddy, Nicki Minaj, Busta Rhymes, Rick Ross, Fabolous, Jadakiss, Fat Joe and Swizz Beatz.

Upon its release, "On My Way" featuring Kevin Cossom, Bali, Ace Hood, BallGreezy, Iceberg, Rum, Desloc, Triple C's member Gunplay, and Young Cash, also charted at number 16 on the US Billboard Bubbling Under Hot 100 Singles chart.

== Reception ==
=== Critical reception ===
Professional ratings
Review scores
Source	Rating
AllMusic	3.5/5 stars
DJBooth	3/5 stars
HipHopDX	2/5 stars

The album received mixed reviews. David Jeffries of AllMusic called the album a "fist-pumping song cycle of triumph in the hood". He called the five-star lineup of T-Pain, Ludacris, Snoop Dogg, and Rick Ross on "All I Do Is Win" the gold medal track, with the Young Jeezy showcase "Put Your Hands Up" winning the silver. He stated Bun B's help on the song "Rockin' All My Chains On" helps score the bronze, giving the track a slight edge over the hood reggae number "Killing Me," which partners Busta Rhymes with Jamaican stars Buju Banton and Bounty Killer. Through intros and shout-outs, Khaled puts more of himself into this personal, story-telling album, and while this supposedly troubled effort seems complete and sound, for the most part. He disliked the closing song "Rep My City" saying that it "is the least satisfying number and is best thought of as a bonus track". In conclusion he said "(the album) is as satisfying as his other mega-star-studded albums, with the added benefit of being more cohesive and significantly more purposeful.

Edwin Ortiz of HipHopDX praised the single "Fed Up" with an all-star lineup and a catchy hook by Usher. But said the song "On My Way" got a bit tiring with eight different artists on the track. He also disliked the songs "Bring the Money Out" and "Rockin' All My Chains On". Talking about "Rockin' All My Chains On" he stated that it's almost downright unfair to put Birdman and Soulja Boy on the same song as Bun B. He applauded Nas' performance in "Victory". In conclusion he said that "We may look back on DJ Khaled's legacy in Hip Hop and see some shining moments. However, Victory as a whole product will certainly not be one of them."

=== Commercial performance ===
The album debuted at number 14 on the US Billboard 200, number 5 on the US Top R&B/Hip-Hop Albums, and number 2 on the US Top Rap Albums charts. Behind Lil Wayne's Rebirth (2010), it sold 28,000 copies in its first week.

== Track listing ==
No.	Title	Writer(s)	Producer(s)	Length
1.	"Intro" (featuring Diddy and Busta Rhymes)		Leroy Romans; DJ Khaled^{[a]}	2:34
2.	"All I Do Is Win" (featuring T-Pain, Ludacris, Rick Ross and Snoop Dogg)	Christopher Bridges; Calvin Broadus, Jr.; Johnny Mollings, Lenny Mollings; William Roberts II	DJ Nasty & LVM; DJ Khaled^{[a]}	3:49
3.	"Put Your Hands Up" (featuring Young Jeezy, Plies, Rick Ross and Schife)	Algernod Washington; Jay Jenkins; Ian Lewis; Oscar Zayas; Roberts II	Schife; OhZee; DJ Khaled^{[a]}	5:12
4.	"Fed Up" (featuring Usher, Young Jeezy, Rick Ross, Drake and Lil Wayne)	Andrew Harr; Aubrey Graham; Dwayne Carter, Jr.; Jenkins; Jermaine Jackson; Roberts II; Usher Raymond IV	The Runners; DJ Khaled^{[a]}	4:11
5.	"Victory" (featuring Nas and John Legend)	John Stephens; Leigh Elliott; Maurice Carpenter; Nasir Jones	The Inkredibles; DJ Khaled^{[a]}	3:13
6.	"Ball" (featuring Jim Jones and Schife)	Joseph Jones II; Lewis; Zayas	Schife; OhZee; DJ Khaled^{[a]}	3:48
7.	"Rockin' All My Chains On" (featuring Bun B, Birdman and Soulja Boy)	Bernard Freeman; Bryan Williams; DeAndre Way; Zayas	Schife; OhZee; DJ Khaled^{[a]}	3:40
8.	"Killing Me" (featuring Buju Banton, Busta Rhymes and Bounty Killer)	Harr, Jackson; Mark Myrie; Rodney Price; Trevor Smith, Jr.	The Runners; DJ Khaled^{[a]}	3:44
9.	"Bringing Real Rap Back" (featuring Rum)	Earl Anderson; Harr; Jackson	The Runners	4:03
10.	"Bring the Money Out" (featuring Nelly, Lil Boosie, Ace Hood and Schife)	Antoine McColister; Cornell Haynes, Jr.; Lewis; Torrence Hatch; Zayas	Schife; OhZee; DJ Khaled^{[a]}	3:20
11.	"On My Way" (featuring Kevin Cossom, Bali, Ace Hood, BallGreezy, Ice Berg, Desloc, Gunplay, Rum and Young Cash)	Anderson; Kevin Cossom; Daniel Smith; Jackson; Jake Greezy; Harr; Mark Randolph; McColister; Richard Morales, Jr.	The Runners; DJ Khaled^{[a]}	5:50
12.	"Rep My City" (featuring Pitbull and Jarvis)	Armando Pérez; Luis Diaz; Dwane Jarvis	Luis Diaz	3:38

Japan edition bonus tracks
No.	Title	Writer(s)	Producer(s)	Length
13.	"I'm So Hood" (Remix) (featuring Young Jeezy, Ludacris, Busta Rhymes, Big Boi, Lil Wayne, Fat Joe, Birdman & Rick Ross)	Khaled; Najm; Jenkins; Bridges; Smith; Patton; Williams; Roberts II; Carter, Jr.; Cartagena; Harr; Jackson	The Runners	5:45
14.	"Fed Up" (Karaoke)			3:29
Total length:				56:12

Notes

- ^{^a} signifies a co-producer

== Charts ==
=== Weekly charts ===
Weekly chart performance
Chart (2010)	Peak position
Canadian Albums (Nielsen SoundScan)	56
US Billboard 200	14
US Independent Albums (Billboard)	1
US Top R&B/Hip-Hop Albums (Billboard)	5
US Top Rap Albums (Billboard)	2

=== Year-end charts ===
Year-end chart performance
Chart (2010)	Position
US Independent Albums (Billboard)	49
US Top R&B/Hip-Hop Albums (Billboard)	72
