= Alrad Lewis =

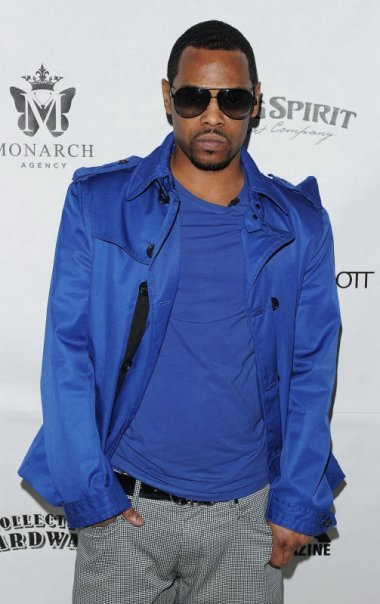

Background information
- Also known as: Boola
- Born: May 10, 1977 (age 48)
- Origin: Hempstead, Long Island, U.S.
- Genres: Hip hop, alternative
- Occupations: Producer, songwriter, rapper
- Years active: 2001–present
- Labels: MCA, Roc-A-Fella
- Website: boolaworld.com

Alrad Lewis (born May 10, 1977), also known as Boola, is an American hip-hop producer, composer and artist. Growing up in Hempstead, Long Island, Boola started his own rap group with kids in the neighborhood. After taking on production responsibilities for the group, Boola decided to concentrate on the production aspect of the music business and soon began working with artists signed to Warner and MCA.

== Music career ==
In 2002, after producing for Warner and MCA Records, Boola signed a deal with Roc-A-Fella records. For the next seven years, Boola produced for and worked with artists such as Beanie Sigel, Cam'ron, Kanye West, Nicole Wray, Ne-Yo, Nas and Jaheim. After the Roc-A-Fella split, Boola continued to produce expanding into TV and film placements including VH1's Basketball Wives and MTV's Making With The Band. In 2011, Boola released the "Produced By Boola" mixtape series which featured original material from Nas, Ne-Yo, Bun B and others. Shortly after he began to pursue a career as an artist, and in November 2012 appeared on BET's 106 & Park, to premiere his video "Starting 5". It featured Maffew Ragazino, Mickey Factz, Reek Da Villian, and Jon Connor (produced by Bink).

Boola's latest project is a mixtape album No Better Time Than The Present and, along with "Starting 5", featured the first single "Kim K".

== Discography ==
=== Studio albums (artist) ===
- 2012: No Better Time Than The Present (Mixtape Album)

=== Mixtapes (artist/producer) ===
- 2011: Cut from a Different Cloth
- 2011: Produced By Boola

=== Songs (producer) ===
- 2007: Beanie Sigel – H.H.E.H
- 2007 N.O.R.E – I'ma Get You
- 2006: Ne-Yo – I Ain't Gotta Tell You
- 2006: Jaheim – The Chosen One
- 2006: Cam'Ron – Something New
- 2005: Beanie Sigel – Flatline, Oh Daddy, Tales of a Hustler
- 2005: Nicole Wray – If I was Your Girlfriend
- 2005: Rell – Real Love
- 2005: Young Gunz – What We Gotta Do
- 2005: Lost Boyz – Lets Go, My Way
- 2004: Young Gunz – That's Right
- 2004: Jim Jones – Capo Status, Take. 1 Take 2, Final Take
- 2004: Diplomats – Duty Clap
- 2003: State Property – Temporary Relief, State Prop You Know Us
- 2003: GZA – Did Ya Say That
