= All of the Above (Youth Alive album) =

Live album by Youth Alive Western Australia
- Released: 17 April 2006
- Recorded: 19 November 2005, Summerfest, Metrochurch Perth
- Genre: Contemporary Christian
- Length: 69:05
- Label: Youth Alive Music
- Producer: Chad Blondel

Youth Alive Western Australia chronology
Shout Your Glory (2005)	All of the Above (2006)

All of the Above is Youth Alive Western Australia's third praise and worship album, and first live recording in recent years. The album is varied in style - along with typical praise and worship songs, the album also features the faux hard rock sound on "Shout Your Glory", a cover of Jimmy Eat World's "Sweetness", and a generic hip-hop "remix" of Hillsong United's "Tell The World". The CD comes with a free bonus DVD which includes video of six of the songs from the live recording, a "mockumentary" of the live recording and printable sheet music of some of the songs.

== Track listing ==
1. "Can't Live A Day" (words and music by Matt Garner and Chad Blondel)
2. "Crazy" (words and music by Matt Garner)
3. "All of the Above" (words and music by Ben Blondel)
4. "No God Like Mine" (words and music by Chad Blondel)
5. "God of Miracles" (words and music by Matt Garner)
6. "Spirit of the Lord" (words and music by Matt Garner)
7. "Hungry for More" (words and music by Matt Garner)
8. "It is You" (words and music by Matt Garner)
9. "All I Am" (words and music by Chad Blondel)
10. "Shout Your Glory" (words and music by Chad Blondel)
11. "Sweetness/Can't Live a Day (reprise)" (words and music by Jim Adkins (Sweetness), Matt Garner and Chad Blondel (Can't Live a Day))
12. "Fall at Your Feet" (words and music by Ryan Armstrong)
13. "Tell The World (remix)" (words and music by Jone Vasu, Chad Blondel, Jonathan Douglas, Joel Houston and Marty Sampson)

== DVD Bonuses ==
The PAL edition bonus DVD (released for Australia) has several hidden features - humorous videos from various church youth groups in Western Australia. The bonus mode can be activated by highlighting "song selection" on the main DVD menu, and then pressing the following key combination on a DVD remote: Left Down Left Up Right Right Play. The hidden features were removed from the International (NTSC) release of the DVD.
