= Hustlin' =

Single by Rick Ross

from the album Port of Miami
- Released: March 11, 2006
- Recorded: 2005
- Genre: Southern hip hop; Gangsta rap; trap
- Length: 4:14
- Label: Slip-n-Slide; Def Jam; Poe Boy
- Songwriters: William Roberts II; Andrew Harr; Jermaine Jackson
- Producer: The Runners

Rick Ross singles chronology
"Told y'all" (2002)	"Hustlin'" (2006)	"Push It" (2006)

Music video
- "Hustlin' " on YouTube

"Hustlin'" is the debut single by American rapper Rick Ross, and the first single from his debut album Port of Miami, produced by The Runners.

The song was a breakthrough for Ross, and skyrocketed him to worldwide fame almost overnight. It peaked at number 54 on the US Billboard Hot 100, and led to Ross becoming the subject of a bidding war, receiving offers from Diddy's Bad Boy Entertainment and Irv Gotti's Murder Inc., before signing a multi-million-dollar deal with Def Jam Recordings.

The song is featured on the track list of the video game Skate. It is also featured in comedy films We're the Millers and Identity Thief, as well as “9 Days”, a season 3 episode of the scripted comedy series Brooklyn Nine-Nine. Comedian Katt Williams devised a comedy routine using the song's chorus to punctuate his humor; the routine is seen in the 2007 film American Hustle, and Williams later reprised the routine for one of his Split Sides Comedy Club performance segments in the 2008 video game Grand Theft Auto IV. The song is also featured in Amazon Prime's Cross Season 1, Episode 1.

== Music video ==
Directed by Gil Green, Rick Ross wears a shirt with the words "Boobie Boys" in homage to a drug gang. Pitbull, Trick Daddy, Cool and Dre, Smitty, DJ Drama, DJ Khaled, Field Mob, The Runners, and Trina are seen in the music video.

== Remixes ==
The official remix of this song features Jay-Z and Young Jeezy, which is also on the album. The song also appears remixed on DJ Drama & Lil Wayne's mixtape Dedication 2. An unofficial leaked remix was made featuring Lil Wayne, Z-Ro, Jay-Z, T.I., Busta Rhymes, Remy Ma, Young Jeezy and Lil Flip. Another unofficial remix was leaked featuring Jay-Z's verse.

== Charts ==
=== Weekly charts ===
Chart (2006)	Peak position
US Billboard Hot 100	54
US Hot R&B/Hip-Hop Songs (Billboard)	11
US Hot Rap Songs (Billboard)	7
US Pop 100 (Billboard)	47
US Rhythmic Airplay (Billboard)	27

=== Year-end charts ===
Chart (2006)	Position
US Hot R&B/Hip-Hop Songs (Billboard)	49

== Certifications ==
Region	Certification	Certified units/sales
New Zealand (RMNZ)	Gold	15,000^{‡}
United Kingdom (BPI) Jay-Z and Young Jeezy remix	Silver	200,000^{‡}
United States (RIAA)	2× Platinum	2,000,000^{‡}
^{‡} Sales+streaming figures based on certification alone.
