= All the Above (Beanie Sigel song) =

Single by Beanie Sigel featuring R. Kelly

from the album The Solution
- B-side: "Go Low"
- Released: October 29, 2007
- Recorded: 2007
- Genre: East Coast hip-hop, hip-hop
- Label: Roc-A-Fella, Def Jam
- Songwriters: Dwight Grant; Robert Sylvester Kelly; Kevin Cossom; Jermaine Jackson; Andrew Harr
- Producer: The Runners

Beanie Sigel singles chronology
"Feel It in the Air" (2005)	"All the Above" (2007)	"Ready for War" (2009)

R. Kelly singles chronology
"Speedin'" (2007)	"All the Above" (2007)	"Out of this Club" (2008)

"All the Above" is the first single from Beanie Sigel's fourth studio album, The Solution. It is the first track on the album.

== Background ==
The track features R. Kelly and was produced by The Runners. It samples a line off from Jay-Z's skit "Public Service Announcement (Interlude)" from his album The Black Album.

Beanie Sigel spoke on the single, he said:

I ain't even know if he was gonna do it...I told him I got this record — 'cause you know the situation with Jay and him. ... I was like, 'If dude gets on this record, it'll be crazy.' So I sent it out to him, got the response he was gonna do it. [Kelly] knocked it out, he sent it back in like three days.

== Music video ==
The music video is directed by Jessy Terrero.

== Chart ==
Chart positions	Peak position
US Hot R&B/Hip-Hop Singles & Tracks	#83
