= The Runners (production duo) =

American music production duo

- Origin: Orlando, Florida, U.S.
- Genres: Hip-hop; EDM; R&B
- Instruments: Yamaha Motif; Apple Mac; Akai MPC2000XL; Logic Pro; Akai MPK49 controller
- Years active: 2000−present
- Labels: Track Team Records; Track-N-Field Entertainment
- Members: Andrew "Dru Brett" Harr; Jermaine "Mayne Zane" Jackson
- Website: www.runnersmusicgroup.com

The Runners are an American electronic and hip hop production duo from Orlando, Florida, consisting of Andrew "Dru Brett" Harr and Jermaine "Mayne Zane" Jackson. Formed in 2000, their foray into musical production was inspired by Timbaland and the Neptunes. Their trademark is an exhale sound effect echoing "Ahhh" at the beginning of their productions.

The duo first became known for their credits on the 2006 single "Hustlin'" by Rick Ross and the 2008 single "Go Hard" by DJ Khaled, and gained further recognition for their extensive work on releases for both artists. They have since produced songs for artists including Keyshia Cole, Cher Lloyd, Ace Hood, Chris Brown, Fat Joe, Juelz Santana, Nelly, Kevin Gates, Jim Jones, Lil Wayne, Fabolous and Usher. Their production often accompanies songwriting from Kevin Cossom or Rico Love, while they often work in tandem with fellow Florida-based producer acts DJ Nasty & LVM, the Monarch and Cubic Z.

== History ==
The Runners first met as toddlers in Vero Beach, Florida. In 2000, they named themselves the Runners and set up shop in Orlando, where they launched Trac-N-Field Entertainment. In 2008, the Runners were nominated for Producer of the Year at the BET Awards.

They produced two tracks on Rihanna's fifth studio album Loud, "Cheers (Drink to That)" and "California King Bed". They have also produced British singer-rapper Cher Lloyd's debut single "Swagger Jagger". On March 31, 2012, they went in the studio to produce for Shakira. Although their work is primarily hip hop they have recently created several songs for TV including John Walsh's America's Most Wanted intro. On October 7, 2014, they released their first original dance music track "We Will Stand" on Track Team Records.

Jermaine "Mayne Zane" Jackson performs and produces now as BLVK JVCK.

== Production discography ==
=== Singles ===
- 2006: "Where Da Cash At" (Curren$y featuring Lil Wayne & Remy Ma)
- 2006: "Hustlin'" (Rick Ross)
- 2006: "Born-N-Raised" (DJ Khaled featuring Trick Daddy, Pitbull, & Rick Ross)
- 2007: "All the Above" (Beanie Sigel featuring R. Kelly)
- 2007: "Go Getta" (Young Jeezy featuring R. Kelly)
- 2007: "Bet That" (Trick Daddy featuring Chamillionaire & Gold Rush)
- 2007: "Dreamin'" (Young Jeezy featuring Keyshia Cole)
- 2007: "I'm So Hood" (DJ Khaled featuring Trick Daddy, Rick Ross, Plies, & T-Pain)
- 2007: "Slap" (Ludacris)
- 2007: "Speedin'" (Rick Ross featuring R. Kelly)
- 2008: "Cash Flow" (Ace Hood featuring T-Pain & Rick Ross)
- 2008: "Out Here Grindin" (DJ Khaled featuring Akon, Rick Ross, Plies, Lil Boosie, Trick Daddy, Ace Hood & Lil Wayne)
- 2008: "Baby Doll" (Girlicious)
- 2008: "Go Hard" (DJ Khaled featuring Kanye West & T-Pain)
- 2009: "Cause A Scene" (Teairra Mari featuring Flo Rida)
- 2009: "Overtime" (Ace Hood featuring Akon & T-Pain)
- 2009: "My Time" (Fabolous featuring Jeremih)
- 2009: "Champion" (Ace Hood featuring Rick Ross & Jazmine Sullivan)
- 2009: "Thinkin' About You"(Mario)
- 2009: "Fed Up" (DJ Khaled featuring Usher, Rick Ross, Drake, & Lil Wayne)
- 2010: "Hey Daddy (Daddy's Home)" (Usher featuring Plies)
- 2010: "Lowkey Poppin" (Kid Ink)
- 2011: "California King Bed" (Rihanna)
- 2011: "Swagger Jagger" (Cher Lloyd)
- 2011: "Cheers (Drink to That)" (Rihanna)
- 2012: "Take It to the Head" (DJ Khaled)
- 2013: "Ready" (Fabolous, Chris Brown)
- 2017: Sounds Good To Me (Nelly)
