= Ace Hood discography =

Discography of American rapper

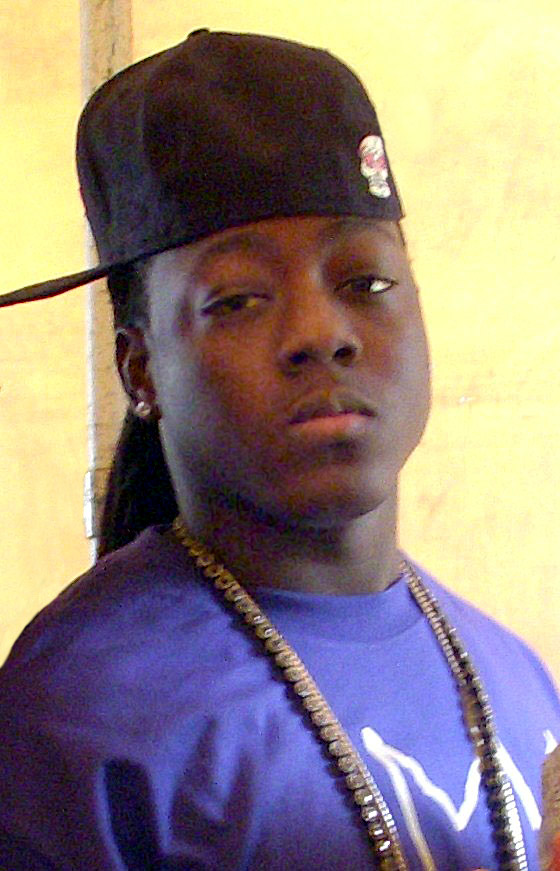
- Ace Hood at Howard University's homecoming in 2008
- Studio albums: 10
- Singles: 16
- Music videos: 49
- Mixtapes: 37
- Guest appearances: 96

The discography of American rapper Ace Hood consists of 7 studio albums, 22 mixtapes, 16 singles and 89 guest appearances.

His major albums, all of which released by We the Best Music Group, were co-released by Def Jam Recordings for Gutta (2007), Ruthless (2009), and Blood, Sweat & Tears (2011), while Cash Money and Republic Records co-released Trials & Tribulations (2013).

== Albums ==
=== Studio albums ===
List of albums, with selected chart positions and sales figures
Title	Album details	Peak chart positions					Sales
Title	Album details	US	US R&B/HH	US Rap	CAN	UK R&B	Sales
Gutta	Released: November 18, 2008; Label: We the Best, Def Jam; Format: CD, LP, digital download	36	5	2	—	—	24,700 (First Week Sales)
Ruthless	Released: June 30, 2009; Label: We the Best, Def Jam; Format: CD, digital download	23	5	2	—	—	19,700 (First Week Sales)
Blood, Sweat & Tears	Released: August 9, 2011; Label: We the Best, Def Jam; Format: CD, digital download	8	3	2	—	—	26,000 (First Week Sales)
Trials & Tribulations	Released: July 16, 2013; Label: We the Best, Cash Money, Republic; Format: CD, digital download	4	2	2	19	29	60,000 (As of August 2013)
Mr. Hood	Released: May 29, 2020; Label: Hood Nation, Empire; Format: Digital download	—	—	—	—	—	
M.I.N.D. (Memories Inside Never Die)	Released: February 25, 2022; Label: Hood Nation, Empire; Format: Digital download	—	—	—	—	—	
B.O.D.Y. (Build or Destroy You)	Released: October 27, 2023; Label: Hood Nation, Empire; Format: Digital download	—	—	—	—	—	
S.O.U.L. (Some of Us Lose)	Released: July 18, 2025; Label: Hood Nation, Empire; Format: Digital download	—	—	—	—	—	

== Mixtapes ==
List of mixtapes, with selected chart positions
Title	Mixtape details	Peak chart positions
Title	Mixtape details	US Ind.
Ace Won't Fold	Released: April 19, 2008; Label: We the Best; Format: Digital download	—
All Bets on Ace	Released: September 4, 2008; Label: We the Best; Format: Digital download	—
The Preview	Released: April 19, 2009; Label: We the Best; Format: Digital download	—
Final Warning	Released: June 18, 2009; Label: Self-released; Format: Digital download	—
Street Certified	Released: November 23, 2009; Label: Self-released; Format: Digital download	—
The Statement	Released: October 13, 2010; Label: We the Best; Format: Digital download	—
I Do It... for the Sport	Released: December 31, 2010; Label: We the Best; Format: Digital download	—
Sex Chronicles	Released: February 14, 2011; Label: We the Best; Format: Digital download	—
Body Bag	Released: May 21, 2011; Label: We the Best; Format: Digital download	—
The Statement 2	Released: September 12, 2011; Label: We the Best; Format: Digital download	—
Starvation	Released: March 30, 2012; Label: We the Best; Format: Digital download	—
Body Bag 2	Released: August 17, 2012; Label: We the Best, Cash Money; Format: Digital download	—
Starvation 2	Released: January 10, 2013; Label: We the Best, Cash Money; Format: Digital download	—
Starvation 3	Released: January 17, 2014; Label: We the Best, Cash Money; Format: Digital download	—
Body Bag 3	Released: August 29, 2014; Label: We the Best, Cash Money; Format: Digital download	—
Starvation 4	Released: November 3, 2015; Label: We the Best; Format: Digital download	—
Starvation 5	Released: July 11, 2016; Label: Hood Nation; Format: Digital download	—
Body Bag 4	Released: November 7, 2016; Label: Hood Nation; Format: Digital download	—
Trust the Process	Released: August 21, 2017; Label: Hood Nation; Format: Digital download	—
Trust the Process II: Undefeated	Released: May 11, 2018; Label: Hood Nation, Empire; Format: Digital download	27
Body Bag 5	Released: March 1, 2019; Label: Hood Nation, Empire; Format: Digital download	—
Body Bag 6	Released: February 3, 2023; Label: Hood Nation, Empire; Format: Digital download	—

== Singles ==
=== As lead artist ===
List of singles as lead artist, with selected chart positions and certifications, showing year released and album name
Title	Year	Peak chart positions				Certifications	Album
Title	Year	US	US R&B/HH	US Rap	DEN	Certifications	Album
"Cash Flow" (featuring T-Pain and Rick Ross)	2008	120	55	—	—		Gutta
"Ride" (featuring Trey Songz)	2008	90	27	14	—		Gutta
"Overtime" (featuring Akon and T-Pain)	2009	—	70	—	—		Ruthless
"Champion" (featuring Jazmine Sullivan and Rick Ross)	2009	—	58	—	—		Ruthless
"Hustle Hard"	2011	60	9	10	—		Blood, Sweat & Tears
"Go n Get It"	2011	—	60	—	—		Blood, Sweat & Tears
"Body 2 Body" (featuring Chris Brown)	2011	65	6	6	—		Blood, Sweat & Tears
"Bugatti" (featuring Future and Rick Ross)	2013	33	9	8	33	RIAA: Platinum	Trials & Tribulations
"We Outchea" (featuring Lil Wayne)	2013	119	49	—	—		Trials & Tribulations
"I Know How It Feel" (featuring Ty Dolla Sign)	2015	—	—	—	—		Non-album single
"Big Fish"	2020	—	—	—	—		Mr. Hood
"—" denotes a recording that did not chart.

=== As featured artist ===
List of singles as featured artist, with selected chart positions and certifications, showing year released and album name
Title	Year	Peak chart positions				Certifications	Album
Title	Year	US	US R&B/HH	US Rap	CAN	Certifications	Album
"Out Here Grindin" (DJ Khaled featuring Akon, Rick Ross, Young Jeezy, Lil Boosie, Trick Daddy, Ace Hood and Plies)	2008	38	32	17	71	RIAA: Gold; MC: Gold	We Global
"B-Boyz" (Birdman featuring Mack Maine, Kendrick Lamar, Ace Hood and DJ Khaled)	2012	—	—	—	—		Non-album singles
"Untouchable" (DJ Absolut featuring Ace Hood, Pusha T and French Montana)	2012	—	—	—	—		Non-album singles
"All We Know" (DJ Absolut featuring Ace Hood, Ray J, Swizz Beatz, Bow Wow and Fat Joe)	2013	—	—	—	—		Non-album singles
"New Guy" (Sarkodie featuring Ace Hood)	2015	—	—	—	—		Non-album singles
"—" denotes a recording that did not chart.

=== Promotional singles ===
List of promotional singles, with selected chart positions, showing year released and album name
Title	Year	Peak chart positions	Album
Title	Year	US R&B/HH	Album
"The Realist Living" (featuring Rick Ross)	2011	100	The Statement 2
"Welcome to My Hood" (Remix) (DJ Khaled featuring Ludacris, T-Pain, Busta Rhymes, Mavado, Twista, Birdman, Ace Hood, Fat Joe, Jadakiss, Bun B, Game and Waka Flocka Flame)	2011	—	We the Best Forever
"I Need Your Love" (featuring Trey Songz)	2012	—	Non-album single
"Have Mercy"	2013	—	Trials & Tribulations
"Supposed to Do" (featuring Skepta)	2014	—	Non-album single
"—" denotes a recording that did not chart.

== Other charted songs ==
List of songs, with selected chart positions, showing year released and album name
Title	Year	Peak chart positions		Album
Title	Year	US Bub.	US R&B/HH	Album
"Born an OG" (featuring Ludacris)	2009	19	—	Ruthless
"On My Way" (DJ Khaled featuring Kevin Cossom, Bali, Ace Hood, Ball Greezy, Iceberg, Rum, Gunplay, Desloc and Young Cash)	2010	16	—	Victory
"B.L.A.B. (Ballin' Like a Bitch)"	2012	—	85	Body Bag 2
"I'm Still" (DJ Khaled featuring Chris Brown, Wale, Wiz Khalifa and Ace Hood)	2013	—	54	Suffering from Success
"—" denotes a recording that did not chart.

== Guest appearances ==
List of non-single guest appearances, with other performing artists, showing year released and album name
Title	Year	Other artist(s)	Album
"Paper Chase"	2008	Bizniz Kid	none
"Standing on the Mountain Top"	2008	DJ Khaled, Pooh Bear	We Global
"Final Warning"	2008	DJ Khaled, Bun B, Blood Raw, Brisco, Bali, Lil Scrappy, Shawty Lo, Rock City	We Global
"Blood Money"	2008	DJ Khaled, Brisco, Rick Ross, Birdman	We Global
"Vibing" (Remix)	2008	DJ Khaled, Piccolo	We Global
"I'm the Shit"	2008	Ball Greezy, Brisco	non-album single
"Gutta Bitch" (Remix)	2009	Trai'D, DJ Khaled, Hurricane Chris, Trina, Bun B	Gutta Bitch
"Yayo"	2009	Flo Rida, Brisco, Billy Blue, Ball Greezy, Rick Ross, Red Eyezz, Bred, Pitbull	R.O.O.T.S.
"I Don't Give a Fuck"	2009	Bali, Papa Duck	non-album single
"Where They Do That At"	2010	Young Cash, Brisco, Ice Berg, Piccalo, J.T. Money, Ball Greezy, Billy Blue, Chaos	
"Bring the Money Out"	2010	DJ Khaled, Nelly, Lil Boosie, Schife	Victory
"On My Way"	2010	DJ Khaled, Kevin Cossom, Ball Greezy, Desloc Piccalo, Ice Berg, Bali, Gunplay, Rum, Young Cash	Victory
"Perswaysive"	2010	Young Sway Hustle	none
"Hands High"	2010	DJ Noodles, Jermaine Dupri, Brisco, 2 Pistols, Tom G	none
"Ain't Shit Change"	2010	HP	none
"Fall Out" (Remix)	2011	Reek Da Villian, Roscoe Dash, Busta Rhymes, Akon, Bun B	none
"Stand Tall"	2011	N.O.R.E, Curren$y	The N.O.R.E.aster EP
"You Want It, I Get It"	2011	Rich Kidd	We Don't See Em 2
"Red Carpet"	2011	Supastar LT	Voice Of The City
"Racks" (Remix)	2011	YC, Wiz Khalifa, Waka Flocka Flame, Cyhi Da Prynce, Bun B, B.o.B, Yo Gotti, Wale, Cory Gunz, Dose, Cory Mo, Nelly, Twista, Big Sean, Trae Tha Truth	none
"Dope Music"	2011	Chips, Brisco, Peep Game	none
"On My Way To The Money"	2011	Ball Greezy, Brisco	A New Day
"I Know"	2011	YC	Got Racks
"I'm Thuggin"	2011	DJ Khaled, Waka Flocka Flame	We the Best Forever
"Future"	2011	DJ Khaled, Meek Mill, Big Sean, Wale, Vado	We the Best Forever
"Welcome to My Hood" (Remix)	2011	DJ Khaled, Ludacris, T-Pain, Busta Rhymes, Twista, Mavado, Birdman, Fat Joe, The Game, Bun B, Waka Flocka Flame	We the Best Forever
"Lay It Down"	2011	DJ Sam Sneak, Meek Mill, Young Breed	none
"Let It Fly" (Remix)	2011	Maino, Roscoe Dash, DJ Khaled, Meek Mill, Jim Jones, Wale	I Am Who I Am
"Snap" (Remix)	2011	Ice Berg, Trick Daddy	MR. L.I.V.E. 2.5
"Gettin To It"	2011	Hypnotiq, Hussein Fatal	none
"Money On The Floor"	2011	Tank, Slim Thug, Kevin McCall	Diary Of A Mad Man
"Trap Star"	2011	Glasses Malone, Yung Fif	none
"Emergency"	2011	Mavado	none
"You Don’t Hear Me Tho"	2012	French Montana	none
"In This Bitch"	2012	DJ Christion, Fat Joe, Famous Kid Brick	none
"Got Damn"	2012	DJ Kay Slay, Gunplay, Torch	none
"We Going Hard"	2012	Bow Wow	Underrated
"Transform"	2012	Treal Lee, Prince Rick	Still 2 Deep
"That Lowend" (Remix)	2012	Dorrough, Nipsey Hussle, Yo Gotti	none
"Highs & Lows"	2012	¡Mayday!	Take Me To Your Leader
"The Drill"	2012	Game, Meek Mill	California Republic
"Incredible"	2012	Shad Star	none
"Let Em In"	2012	Talib Kweli, Mr. E	We Run This, Vol. 7
"Hustle Like A Muh"	2012	Jadakiss, Styles P	Consignment
"It's On"	2012	R. Kelly, DJ Khaled	none
"Make Some Room"	2012	Ice Berg	Strictly 4 The Streets 3
"Pocket Watching"	2012	Brisco, Cadillac	Fruits Of My Labor
"Destination"	2012	Masspike Miles	Skky Miles
"Black on Black"	2012	Gunplay, Bun B	Self Made Vol. 2
"Shout Out to the Real"	2012	DJ Khaled, Meek Mill, Plies	Kiss The Ring
"I'm So Blessed"	2012	DJ Khaled, Big Sean, Wiz Khalifa, T-Pain	Kiss The Ring
"I Don't See Em"	2012	DJ Khaled, Birdman, 2 Chainz	Kiss The Ring
"Outro (They Don't Want War)"	2012	DJ Khaled	Kiss The Ring
"Don't Get Me Started"	2012	DJ Khaled	Kiss The Ring
"Bitches & Bottles (Let's Get It Started)" (Remix)	2012	DJ Khaled, T.I., Lil Wayne, Future	none
"T'es Mort Dans Le Film"	2012	La Fouine	none
"Cash Erewhere"	2012	Mike WiLL Made It, Juicy J	Est. In 1989 Pt. 2
"Suicidal Thoughts" (Remix)	2012	DJ Khaled, Mavado, French Montana	none
"I Did It For My Dawgz" (Remix)	2012	DJ Khaled, Rick Ross, Meek Mill, Jadakiss, French Montana	none
"Enemies"	2012	Gudda Gudda, Crooked I, Trae Tha Truth	Guddaville 3
"Tryna Come Up" (Remix)	2012	Nino Brown, French Montana, Yo Gotti	none
"Wing Stop"	2012	Compton Menace	Menace 2 Society Vol. 2
"Last of the Real"	2012	French Montana, Mavado	Mac & Cheese 3
"Come and Get It"	2013	T-Pain, Busta Rhymes	none
"Shit Where You Sleep"	2013	Waka Flocka Flame	DuFlocka Rant 2
"Around the Globe"	2013	Trayne	Welcome to the Trayne Station
"Tyrna Come Up" (Remix)	2013	Nino Brown, French Montana, Yo Gotti	New Jack City
"Tryna Win"	2013	Nino Brown, B-Nice	New Jack City
"Don't Make Me Do It"	2013	Funkmaster Flex, Vado, DJ Khaled, Meek Mill, French Montana	Who You Mad At? Me or Yourself?
"Liquor & Drugs"	2013	Funkmaster Flex	Who You Mad At? Me or Yourself?
"We Going Hard"	2013	Bow Wow	Greenlight 5
"I Wanna Know" (Remix)	2013	Prince Malik, Jim Jones, DJ Khaled	none
"Gangster"	2013	Vado, Mavado	none
"Up In Here"	2013	Chinx Drugz	Cocaine Riot 3
"Fuck What Happens Tonight"	2013	French Montana, DJ Khaled, Mavado, Snoop Dogg, Scarface	Excuse My French
"Kobe Or Ginobili" (Remix)	2013	Mack Maine, Rick Ross, French Montana, Busta Rhymes	none
"Hustlaz Intuition"	2013	DJ Scream, Gunplay	The Ratchet Superior
"Dreams Come True"	2013	Yo Gotti, Mack Maine, Birdman	Rich Gang
"Angel"	2013	Mystikal, Jae Millz, Gudda Gudda, Birdman, Mack Maine	Rich Gang
"Master P"	2013	Young Cash	Win Or Die
"All on Your Body"	2013	Jay Sean	Neon
"One Shot"	2013	Lee Mazin	In My Own Lane
"Suffering From Success"	2013	DJ Khaled, Future	Suffering from Success
"You Don’t Want These Problems"	2013	DJ Khaled, 2 Chainz, Meek Mill, French Montana, Rick Ross, Big Sean, Timbaland	Suffering from Success
"Blackball"	2013	DJ Khaled, Future, Plies	Suffering from Success
"I'm Rich"	2014	Red Café, French Montana, Jeremih	American Psycho II
"Go Off"	2014	Reek da Villain, Swizz Beatz, Kendrick Lamar	none
"Hold You Down" (Remix)	2015	DJ Khaled, Usher, Fabolous, Rick Ross	I Changed a Lot
"Every Time We Come Around"	2015	DJ Khaled, French Montana, Jadakiss, Vado	I Changed a Lot
"I Ain't Worried"	2015	DJ Khaled, Rick Ross	I Changed a Lot

== Music videos ==
=== As lead artist ===
List of music videos, with directors, showing year released
Title	Year	Director(s)
"Cash Flow" (featuring T-Pain and Rick Ross)	2008	Gil Green
"Ride" (featuring Trey Songz)	2008	Gil Green
"Ride" (Remix) (featuring Trey Songz, Rick Ross and Juelz Santana)	2008	Gil Green
"Get 'Em Up"	2008	Gil Green
"Can't See Y'all" (featuring Brisco)	2008	Jordan Tower
"Stressin'" (featuring Plies)	2008	Walk-D
"Overtime" (featuring T-Pain and Akon)	2009	Gil Green
"Champion" (featuring Jazmine Sullivan and Rick Ross)	2009	Gil Green
"Loco Wit The Cake" (featuring Schife)	2009	Jordan Tower
"Bout Me" (featuring Ball Greezy)	2009	Jordan Tower
"Zone"	2009	Jordan Tower
"Hustle Hard"	2011	Gil Green
"Hustle Hard" (Remix) (featuring Rick Ross and Lil Wayne)	2011	Gil Green
"Go 'N' Get It"	2011	Dayo
"Body 2 Body" (featuring Chris Brown)	2011	Dayo
"Letter to My Ex's" / "Tear Da Roof Off"	2011	Clifton Bell
"King of the Streets" (featuring T-Pain)	2011	iamKING
"Lord Knows"	2011	J.R Saint
"Memory Lane" / "Spoke to My Momma"	2011	Antwan Smith
"B.L.A.B."	2012	Dayo
"Piss 'Em Off"	2012	Dayo
"Flex"	2012	Edgar Esteves
"I Need Your Love" (featuring Trey Songz)	2012	Gil Green
"Bugatti" (featuring Future and Rick Ross)	2013	Gil Green
"It's Going Down" (featuring Meek Mill)	2013	Edgar Esteves
"Have Mercy"	2013	Ivan Berrios
"We Outchea" (featuring Lil Wayne)	2013	Colin Tilley
"Trials & Tribulations"	2013	Ivan Berrios
"Before The Rollie" (featuring Meek Mill)	2013	none

=== As featured artist ===
List of music videos, with directors, showing year released
Title	Year	Director(s)
"Out Here Grindin" (DJ Khaled featuring Akon, Rick Ross, Plies, Lil Boosie, Ace Hood and Trick Daddy)	2008	Gil Green
"Welcome To My Hood" (Remix) (DJ Khaled featuring Ludacris, T-Pain, Busta Rhymes, Mavado, Twista, Birdman, Ace Hood, Fat Joe, Jadakiss, Bun B, Game and Waka Flocka Flame)	2011	Dayo
"Racks" (Remix) (YC featuring Nelly, B.o.B, Trae tha Truth, Yo Gotti, Cyhi the Prynce, Dose and Ace Hood)	2011	Ian Wolfson
"Untouchable" (DJ Absolut featuring Ace Hood, Pusha T and French Montana)	2012	Shatek
"B-Boyz" (Birdman featuring Mack Maine, Kendrick Lamar, Ace Hood and DJ Khaled)	2012	Derick G
"Bitches & Bottles (Let's Get It Started)" (Remix) (DJ Khaled featuring Lil Wayne, T.I., Future and Ace Hood)	2012	Gil Green
"Don't Get Me Started" (DJ Khaled featuring Ace Hood)	2012	Edgar Esteves
"All We Know" (DJ Absolut featuring Ace Hood, Ray J, Swizz Beatz, Bow Wow and Fat Joe)	2013	Phillyflyboy
"Go Off" (Reek da Villian featuring Kendrick Lamar, Ace Hood and Swizz Beatz)	2014	Picture Perfect

== See also ==
- DJ Khaled discography
