= Lex Luger production discography =

The following list is a discography of production by Lex Luger, an American record producer. It includes a list of songs produced, co-produced and remixed by Luger specified by year, artist, album and title.

== Singles produced ==
List of singles produced, with selected chart positions and certifications, showing year released and album name
Title	Year	Peak chart positions							Certifications	Album
Title	Year	US	US R&B	US Rap	AUS	CAN	IRE	UK	Certifications	Album
"Hard in da Paint" (Waka Flocka Flame)	2010	111	28	20	—	—	—	—	RIAA: Gold	Flockaveli
"B.M.F. (Blowin' Money Fast)" (Rick Ross featuring Styles P)	2010	60	6	4	—	—	—	—	RIAA: Platinum	Teflon Don
"H•A•M" (Kanye West and Jay-Z)	2011	23	24	14	78	47	40	30	RIAA: Gold	Watch the Throne
"Hustle Hard" (Ace Hood)	2011	60	9	10	—	—	—	—		Blood, Sweat & Tears
"Grove St. Party" (Waka Flocka Flame featuring Kebo Gotti)	2011	74	12	10	—	—	—	—		Flockaveli
"Platinum" (Snoop Dogg featuring R. Kelly)	2011	—	60	—	—	—	—	—		Doggumentary
"In da Box" (Sean Garrett featuring Rick Ross)	2011	—	62	—	—	—	—	—		Non-album single
"Go n Get It" (Ace Hood)	2011	—	60	—	—	—	—	—		Blood, Sweat & Tears
"That Way" (Wale featuring Jeremih and Rick Ross)	2011	49	4	5	—	—	—	—	RIAA: Gold	Self Made Vol. 1
"Round of Applause" (Waka Flocka Flame featuring Drake)	2011	86	16	17	—	—	—	—		Triple F Life: Friends, Fans & Family
"9 Piece" (Rick Ross featuring T.I. and Lil Wayne)	2011	61	32	18	—	—	—	—	RIAA: Gold	Ashes to Ashes
"Bake Sale" (Wiz Khalifa featuring Travi$ Scott)	2016	56	18	9	—	71	—	—	RIAA: Gold	Khalifa
"Let it Bang" (A$AP Ferg featuring Schoolboy Q)	2016	—	—	—	—	—	—	—		Always Strive And Prosper
"Champions" (Kanye West featuring Travis Scott, Quavo, Yo Gotti, 2 Chainz, Big Sean, Gucci Mane and Desiigner)	2016	71	—	—	—	—	—		RIAA: Platinum	Cruel Winter
"No English" (Juicy J featuring Travis Scott)	2016	—	—	—	—	—	—	—		RBB3
"Richer Than Everybody" (Gucci Mane featuring Youngboy Never Broke Again and DaBaby)	2019	—	—	—	—	—	—	—		Woptober 2
"MLK BLVD" (Jeezy featuring Meek Mill)	2019	—	—	—	—	—	—	—		TM104: The Legend of the Snowman
"EDD Baby" (Teejayx6 and Lex Luger featuring 24hrs)	2021	—	—	—	—	—	—	—		Generation Scam
"Black Madonna" (Azealia Banks featuring Lex Luger)	2020	—	—	—	—	—	—	—		Business & Pleasure
"—" denotes a recording that did not chart or was not released in that territory.

== 2009 ==
=== Waka Flocka Flame - Salute Me Or Shoot Me 2 ===
- "Hard"
- "I Am An Illusion" (ft. La Chat)
- "I'm Just Livin Life"

=== Wes Fif - Just Watch Me ===
- "What I Want"
- "In My Zone" ft. C-Ride

=== OJ Da Juiceman - Alaska in Atlanta ===
- "Midget"
- "In The Club" feat. Bobby Valentino
- "Vegetarian"
- "Early Morning Trappin"

=== Lex Luger and Waka Flocka Flame - Dj Zazu & Jonay Presents Dat Duffy Vol. 1 hosted By Lex Luger & Waka Flocka ===
- "So Tired" by Waka Flocka Flame ft. Frenchie
- "S.E.X." by Waka Flocka Flame ft. Lil Cap
- "Gangsta Shit" by Dirty Smurf
- "To Da Max" by Sean Teezy ft. Waka Flocka Flame, Roscoe Dash & Travis Porter

== 2010 ==
=== La Chat - Krumbz 2 Brickz ===
- "Gimme Room" (ft. Mazerratti Moe & Certy Mac)

=== 2 Chainz - Trap-A-Velli 2: (The Residue) ===
- "Fuck Da Roof"

=== Lil B ===
- "I Go Woogie"

=== Sharoyce Antwan - Heavenly Teabag: The Nutz Flying Atop Your Ceiling ===
- "These Niggaz" (ft. nWo)
- "Santa Clause" (ft. Bros)

=== Yung Berg ===
- "I Want U"

=== Bape Jonez - Clock Werk Shawty (Hosted By Calico Jonez) ===
- "So Gangsta" ft. Da Kid, Mykko Montana, Gucci Mane & Calico Jonez
- "Off The Chain"
- "I Clock In"

=== Waka Flocka Flame - Lebron Flocka James ===
- "Wats Banging" (ft. Tay Beatz, Gorilla Zoe, (prod. with Tay Beatz)
- "Gucci Got Me Straight" (prod. with Tay Beatz)
- "Go Duffy " (ft. TC & Emani) (prod. with Tay Beatz)
- "Hands" (ft. Gorilla Zoe)
- "Hard N Da Paint"
- "All I Got" (ft. David Blayne)
- "Off Da Chain" (ft. David Blayne & Suga Shane)
- "Swagger Right"
- "Throwin Fingers" (ft. Rich Kid Shawty & Papoose)
- "F*ck Da Police" (ft. Cartel) (prod. with Tay Beatz)
- "Call Waka" (ft. Cartel, La Chat & Gucci Mane) (prod. with Tay Beatz)

=== Yun Jinx - Comic Book Swagg ===
- "Comic Book Swagg"

=== Lil Scrappy - On Point ===
- "On Point"

=== Kebo Gotti - Trap Music Time Edition ===
- "Exotic"

=== Gorilla Zoe - Walkin Money Machine ===
- "Listen"

=== Gorilla Zoe - Gorilla Ape Shit ===
- "Phow"

=== Gorilla Zoe - Stupid Cupid Shawty ===
- "My Goodies" ft. Lika Joon

=== Gorilla Zoe - Engraved in Stone ===
- "Inspector Gadget"
- "Wrecking Ball"

=== Ray Dolla ===
- "Ballin Time" ft. Just Rich Gates
- "Plays"
- "You Don't Wanna Do That"
- "My Digi"

=== Gorilla Zoe - DJ Bobby Black Presents Gorilla Zoe - Diamonds, Dope And Dimez ===
- "Diamonds, Dope, And Dimez"
- "I'm Coming"
- "Robbery"
- "Watching"

=== Gorilla Zoe - 8 Track The Grand Closing ===
- "Be Real"
- "Get"
- "Name On"
- "Numbers"
- "Said I Wouldnt Be Nothing"

=== Ace Hood - The Statement ===
- "Real Shit"
- "Hustle Hard"

=== Maino - DJ Haze - Still Coutin' My Money ===
- "Lick Season" (ft. Haitian Fresh Rick Ross, & French Montana)

=== OJ da Juiceman - O.R.A.N.G.E ===
- "Do Dat" (feat. Bobby V)
- "I'm That Guy"

=== Rick Ross - Teflon Don ===
- "B.M.F. (Blowin' Money Fast)" (feat. Styles P)
- "MC Hammer" (feat. Gucci Mane)

=== Rick Ross - Official Ciroc Mixtape ===
- "Where You From" (feat. Project Pat)

=== Fabolous - There Is No Competition 2: The Grieving Music EP ===
- "Lights Out"

=== Soulja Boy Tell 'Em - Best Rapper ===
- "Digital"
- "I'm Boomin'"
- "The Blues"
- "What About My Clientele"

=== Waka Flocka Flame - Flockaveli ===
- "Bustin' at 'Em" (with Souhside)
- "Hard in da Paint"
- "TTG (Trained to Go)" (feat. French Montana, YG Hootie, Joe Moses, Suge Gotti & Baby Bomb)
- "Bang" (feat. YG Hootie & Slim Dunkin)
- "Young Money/Bricksquad" (feat. Gudda Gudda)
- "Grove St. Party" (feat. Kebo Gotti)
- "Karma" (feat. YG Hootie, Popa Smurf & Slim Dunkin)
- "Live by the Gun" (feat. Ra Diggs & Uncle Murda)
- "G-Check" (feat. YG Hootie, Bo Deal & Joe Moses)
- "Snake in the Grass" (feat. Cartier Kitten)
- "Fuck This Industry"

=== Slim Thug - Tha Thug Show ===
- "How We Do It" (featuring Rick Ross)

=== Tyga - Well Done ===
- "Well Done"
- "Like Me"

=== Game - Brake Lights ===
- "Get 'Em" (featuring Waka Flocka Flame)

=== Kanye West - My Beautiful Dark Twisted Fantasy ===
- "See Me Now" (featuring Beyoncé Knowles, Charlie Wilson & Big Sean) (Produced with Kanye West and No I.D.)

=== OJ da Juiceman - 6 Ringz (The Michael Jordan Edition) ===
- "6 Ringz"
- "I Got Ringz"
- "My Fist"
- "Sausage" (featuring Dre)
- "Own My Own Team"
- "I Remember"

=== Rocko - Rocko Dinero ===
- "Just In Case"
- "Us" (featuring Yo Gotti & Future)

=== Wooh Da Kid - Black Out ===
- "No Romance"
- "Back Against the Wall"

=== Triple C's - Color Cut Clarity ===
- "Walking On Water"

=== Lil Scrappy - DJ Greg Street and Lil Scrappy – Dat's Her? She's Bad ===
- "Overgrind" ft. Young Chu

=== Lil Scrappy - Strictly 4 The Traps N Trunks 8 ===
Sources:

- "Let You Tell It"
- "Overgrind" (ft. Young Chu)

=== Jim Jones - Strictly 4 The Traps N Trunks 8 ===
- "Gretzky (Remix)" (ft. Cam'ron, Vado & Yo Gotti)

=== Outlaw - Blok Hugger Boss ===
- "Black Lambo"

=== Diamond - Cocaine Waitress ===
- "Bottle Poppin" (ft. Young Chu)
- "Hit Dat Hoe" (ft. Waka Flocka Flame)
- "NFL" (ft. 2 Chainz)

=== Zone 6 Sinister - Tales from the Trappers Paradise ===
- "Dope"
- "Decisions" (unreleased track)
- "Zone 6 Sosa"

=== French Montana - Coke Boys ===
- "Whip" (ft. 2 Chainz & Soulja Boy)

=== Soufboi - Street Made 3 ===
- "What I Like To Do"
- "Love When They Hatin"

== 2011 ==
=== Bigg K - Doomsday ===
- "Let Him In"

=== Trouble - Green Light ===
- "Flexxin"

=== Jamie Drastik - Champagne And Cocaine ===
- "Hustle Hard Remix"

=== Trouble - December 17th ===
- "Patnaz Got Stretches" (ft. Alley Boy)

=== Gangsta Boo - Foreva Gangsta ===
- "Need A Gangsta Boo" (ft. Shawty Lo)

=== U.S.D.A. - CTE OR Nothing ===
- "Turned Out"
- "Zoning"

=== Kebo Gotti - Global Warming ===
- "Ratchet" (ft. Waka Flocka Flame)
- "Exotic"
- "Grove St. Party" (ft. Waka Flocka Flame)

=== French Montana - Mister 16 (Casino Life) ===
- "Buko Money" (feat. Suss One & Slim Thug)
- "Whut Up Doe" (feat. Slim Thug)
- "Take It Off" (feat. Waka Flocka Flame, YG & Joe Moses)
- "Ridiculous"

=== Yo Gotti - Cocaine Muzik 6 (Gangsta of the Year) ===
- "Ion Like Them"

=== Mpulse ===
- "Derrick Rose"

=== 2Eleven - CTE 2K11 ===
- "Check Me Out"

=== Big Stacksss ===
- "Trap Starz"

=== Yung Berg - Mr. Ward (Hosted by DJ ill Will, DJ Woogie and DJ Rockstar) ===
- "Intro"
- "What They Do"

=== Zone 6 Sinister - Tales From The 6 Chapter 3 ===
- "Horses"

=== Coco Kiss - Prototype ===
- "Lap Dance" (ft. Jim Jones)

=== Mims - Open Bars ===
- "Vroom Vroom" (ft. 13)

=== Fluid Outrage ===
- "Fuck a Drought"

=== Ro.G ===
- "Psycho"

=== Pill - Strictly 4 The Traps N Trunks 13 (Hosted By Future and Rocko) ===
- "No Play"

=== A Mafia - What The Streets Made Me ===
- "2050"

=== Mike Fresh and Sonny Digital - FreshLife ===
- "Talkin' Money"

=== Chop ===
- "Drop On 'Em" ft. Rick Ross

=== Bricksquad - Bricksquad Mafia (Gucci Mane Presents) ===
- "We Taken Bricks"
- "Pass"
- "Everything Bricksquad"

=== Avatar Young Blaze - Danny Darko ===
- "Mask Up, Dump Off"

=== Layne Harper - Life in the Fast Layne Fridays ===
- "Air Em' Out"

=== Kanye West and Jay-Z - Watch the Throne ===
- "H•A•M" (Produced with Kanye West and Mike Dean)

=== Meek Mill - Dreamchasers ===
- Work ft. Rick Ross

=== OJ da Juiceman - Culinary Art School 2 ===
- "Juice Where You Been"
- "Sell Chickens"
- "Clockin'"
- "Hundreds"
- "Down For Too Long"

=== U.S.D.A. - The Afterparty ===
- "Zoning"

=== Snoop Dogg - Doggumentary ===
- "Platinum" (featuring R. Kelly)

=== Wiz Khalifa - Cabin Fever (mixtape) ===
- "Taylor Gang" (featuring Chevy Woods)
- "GangBang" (featuring Big Sean)
- "Hustlin'"
- "Wtf"
- "Errday" (featuring Juicy J)

=== Giggs - "Take Your Hats Off" ===
- "Gangsta Hop" (featuring Waka Flocka Flame)
- "Middle Fingers" (featuring Waka Flocka Flame, Gunna Dee, Killa Ki)
- "Take Your Hats Off"

=== Rick Ross - Ashes to Ashes ===
- "9 Piece" (featuring Lil' Wayne)
- "9 Piece (Remix)" (featuring Lil' Wayne & T.I.)

=== Alex Niedt and Flash ===
- "Hold Me Down"

=== Juicy J - Rubba Band Business (mixtape) ===
- "Stunna's Do" (featuring Billy Wes)
- "Smokin' And Sippin"
- "Rattin' Azz"
- "So Much Money"
- "Niggaz Got Problems"
- "I Ain't Sparin' Niggas"
- "Flip That Bitch A Few Times"
- "Get Me High" (featuring Reno & V Slash)
- "Boom" (featuring V Slash)
- "Niggaz Violate"
- "Do It Big"
- "Take Sum"
- "Hood Sprung"
- "Dread Shakin'" (featuring V Slash & Reno)
- "I'm 100"
- "That's What I'm Cockin'" (featuring Sno)
- "Girl After Girl" (featuring Nicki Minaj & Gucci Mane)
- "$$$ Signs" (Three 6 Mafia, Rick Ross & Billy Wes)
- "Party" (featuring Three 6 Mafia & Roscoe Dash)

=== Tyga - Black Thoughts 2 (mixtape) ===
- "Lap Dance"
- "Bad Bitches Feat. Gudda Gudda"

=== Smoke DZA - T.H.C. ===
- "Loaded"
- "Loaded (Remix)" ft. Schoolboy Q

=== Maybach Music Group - Self Made Vol. 1 ===
- "That Way" (Wale & Rick Ross featuring Jeremih)
- "Big Bank" (Pill, Rick Ross, Meek Mill & Torch featuring French Montana)

=== Juicy J - Rubba Band Business 2 (mixtape) ===
- "A Zip And A Double Cup"
- "So Damn Fucked Up"
- "Money Money To Make Money"
- "Inhale" (featuring Machine Gun Kelly)
- "Who Da Neighbors"
- "Met The Wrong Gun"
- "Smoke That Bitch" (featuring VABP)
- "Bombay Gin Dance"
- "Erryday" (featuring Wiz Khalifa)
- "Killa"
- "Introduce" (featuring Don Trip)
- "Pills, Weed & Pussy" (featuring Project Pat)
- "Get To Meet A G"
- "Strapped With The Strap"
- "White Girl"
- "Make It Happen" (featuring Casey Veggies)
- "Street Shit"
- "What The Fuck Is Yall On"

=== 2 Chainz - T.R.U. REALigion ===
- "Undastatement" (produced with Southside)
- "Money Makin Mission"

=== Sharky - The Takeover ===
- "Murder Scene" (featuring Compton Menace)
- "Step Out (featuring Doey)
- "Cali Back (featuring Helen & Mil)
- "My Money"
- "Why They Mad" (featuring Brose Royce)
- "My World"
- "2 Many" (featuring PC)
- "Takeover" (featuring D Realz & Cold Flamez)
- "Ain't Started Yet" (featuring Doey)
- "420" (featuring Tay & F3rd)
- "Self Paid"
- "Trap Zone"
- "Saggin'In My 501's" (featuring RK)
- "I'm On It" (featuring Breez & Elz)

=== Fat Trel - APRIL FOOLZ ===
- "Respect With the Tech"
- "Tip A Strippa"

=== French Montana - Coke Boys ===
- "Is U Kiddin' Me (featuring Three 6 Mafia)

=== Ace Hood - Blood, Sweat and Tears ===
- "Go 'N' Get It"
- "Hustle Hard"
- "Hustle Hard" (Remix) (featuring Rick Ross & Lil Wayne)
- "Go 'N' Get It" (Remix) (featuring Beanie Sigel, Busta Rhymes, Pusha T & Styles P)

=== Game - California Republic (mixtape) ===
- "Bottles & Rockin' J's" (featuring DJ Khaled, Busta Rhymes, Rick Ross, Fabolous & Lil Wayne)

=== Young Jeezy - The Real Is Back ===
- "All The Money" (featuring 211)

=== Kid Ink - Daydreamer ===
- "Blackout" (featuring Meek Mill)

=== Gucci Mane - Writings on the Wall 2 ===
- "Tragedy"
- "Lil Friends"

=== Doe Boy and Lex Luger - Boyz n da Hood ===
- "Boyz n Da Hood Pt. 2"
- "Ricky"
- "Ghost" (featuring Hollywood Goonie)
- "Be About That" (featuring Goonie and Scrilla)
- "Exposed"
- "Disaster" (featuring Moptop Marley; co-produced by Bobby Kritical)
- "Shout Out" (featuring Nino Cahootz and K-Tee; co-produced by Southside)
- "Str8 From Da Block"
- "Swag School"
- "Death Row"
- "Think About It"
- "Squad Up" (featuring Da Kid)

=== Waka Flocka Flame - Lebron Flocka James 2 ===
- "Bricksquad Trappin"
- "Hard Work Pays Off"
- "Bout A Dollar"
- "To Da Max"
- "Hard In The Paint"
- "Wats Bangin"

=== DJ Khaled - We the Best Forever ===
- "Money" (featuring Young Jeezy & Ludacris)
- "I'm Thuggin'" (featuring Waka Flocka Flame & Ace Hood)

=== David Blayne - R&B Straight Drop (The Cook Up) ===
- "Off Da Chain"

=== Just Rich Gates - Merk Star Gates 2 ===
- "What (Remix)"
- "We Luv Dat"
- "Yea I'm Trappin"
- "Playin' Defense" ft. Waka Flocka Flame, Slim Dunkin, & VA

=== V.A.B.P. - Young Nigga Movement ===
- "Pop A Bean"
- "Back It Up" (featuring Juicy J & Trey Songz)
- "Lean" (feat. Juicy J)
- "New Hoes" (featuring Juicy J)
- "Chopper Loose" (featuring Project Pat)
- "Oh Well" (featuring Juicy J & 2 Chainz)
- "Shades On" (featuring Juicy J & Spinks)
- "Work Out" (featuring Juicy J)
- "Act A Fool"
- "Now" (featuring Project Pat)
- "TTG Wanna See"
- "Maui Wowi"
- "7 Dayz" (featuring Juicy J)
- "I Can't Remember Da Last Time" (featuring Juicy J)
- "Smoke That Bitch" (featuring Juicy J)

=== Soulja Boy Tell 'Em - Bernard Arnault EP ===
- "Texas"

=== Lil Wyte - I Aint Dead ===
- "Money" (featuring Partee, Project Pat & Miss Wyte)

=== Waka Flocka Flame - Salute Me Or Shoot Me 2.5 ===
- "Keep It Real"
- "Da Block Hot"
- "Fuck Da Police"
- "Give It 2 Me"
- "Yeah Nigga"
- "Call Waka"
- "On My Shyt"
- "What Set U Claim"
- "Ride Wit My Niggaz"

=== Ben Beamon - Get Well Soon ===
- "Red"
- "Skiin' Thru Da Snow"
- "Whitegirl Sellin' Whitegirl"
- "Dumbin' Out"
- "For Sure"
- "Like A Billy"
- "Whorez"
- "Dude You're Screwed"
- "Bustin' Bells"

=== Jim Jones - Capo ===
- "Hockey Bag" (featuring Cam'ron & Juelz Santana) (Bonus Track)

=== Waka Flocka Flame and Slim Dunkin - Twin Towers 2 (No Fly Zone) ===
- "Koolin It" (featuring YG Hootie and Kebo Gotti)
- "Lightz On" (featuring Gucci Mane)
- "Wrong One Ta Try" (featuring French Montana)

=== Lil Scrappy - Tha Merlo Jonez EP ===
- "Arguin'"

=== Rich Kid Shawty - Word in da South ===
- "Word Round Da South"
- "Never Stop"
- "We Working"

=== Wale - Ambition ===
- "That Way" (featuring Jeremih & Rick Ross)

=== Lil Wayne - Sorry 4 the Wait ===
- "Grove St. Party" (featuring Lil B)

=== Juicy J - Blue Dream and Lean ===
- "Intro"
- "Drugged Out"
- "Riley"
- "Get Higher"
- "Oh Well (Remix)" (featuring 2 Chainz)
- "She Dancin'"
- "This Bitch By My Side"
- "Cash (Interlude)"
- "You Want Deez Rackz" (Prod. with Sonny Digital)
- "A Zip And A Double Cup (Remix)" (featuring 2 Chainz & Tha Joker)
- "Gotta Stay Strapped" (featuring Project Pat & Alley Boy)
- "I Don't Play With Gunz" (featuring Project Pat & Alley Boy)

=== Frenchie - Bringing Gangsta Back ===
- "My Lifestyle"
- "Catch A Charge"
- "Take Sum" (featuring Project Pat)

=== OJ da Juiceman - The Lord of the Rings ===
- Back From The Dead
- Niggaz in my Business
- Cook It Up Y'all
- No Help

=== Waka Flocka Flame and French Montana - Lock Out ===
- "Black" (featuring Slim Dunkin and Chinx Drugz)
- "Still"
- "Weed & Drinks" (featuring Chinx Drugz)

=== CTC Crazy - Da Young Gunnaz ===
- "Ovas"
- "Wild Life"
- "Pac Man"

=== Frenchie - Chicken Room ===
- "Lord I'm Tired"

=== Rich Hil - 500 Grams ===
- "Slippin' Into Darkness"
- "Half A P"
- "Cherry Pie" (featuring Smoke DZA)
- "500 Grams"
- "Varieties" (featuring Ro Ransom)
- "Just Like That" (featuring Boo-Bonic)
- "It Ain't Time To Go"
- "Ring Around The Rosie"
- "What's Poppin'"
- "Baby Mix It Up"
- "Dippin'" (featuring Boo-Bonic)
- "Show Money"
- "Bout It, Bout It"

=== Black Boy da Kid - Cut the Check 2 ===
- "Money on My Mind"

=== 2 Chainz - Codeine Cowboys (A 2 Chainz Collection) ===
- "Too Easy" (featuring Cap1)
- "Kitchen" (featuring Young Jeezy and Pusha T)

=== Frank Whyte - Registered Real Nigga ===
- Money So Tall (Yao Ming)
- Doing It

=== Wooh Da Kid - Krown the King ===
- "My Benz" (featuring P Smurf, Ice Burgandy and Waka Flocka Flame)

=== Bo Deal - The Chicago Code 2 ===
- "Grindin'"

=== Waka Flocka Flame - Salute Me Or Shoot Me 3 (Hip Hops Outcast) ===
- "Damn"
- "More"
- "365"

=== Tay Don - Death Of Tay Beatz (The Rise Of Tay Don) ===
- "M.O.B."
- "Shootout"
- "Hustle Grind"
- "Throw Up Ur Set" (ft. Lady Jade)

=== Wooh Da Kid - Strap-A-Holics ===
- "Pass" (featuring YG Hootie & Frenchie)
- "No Romance"

=== Tinie Tempah - Happy Birthday ===
- "Leak-a-mixtape" (featuring Giggs)

=== KayO Redd - YNS (The Rise of Sykho Soulja) ===
- "Neutron"
- "Geeked Up"
- "Rap Niggaz Funny"

=== Da KID and Slim Dunkin' - Bad Boys ===
- "To Da Max"
- "Dunk"

=== Mack Mecca and BFN - Head of the Class ===
- "Strapped BFN"

=== Smoke DZA - SweetBabyKushedGod ===
- "SWV" (feat. Domo Genesis & Mookie Jones)

=== Tyga - #BitchImTheShit ===
- "Orgasm"

=== Soufboi - Street Made 3 ===
- "What I Like To Do"
- "Love When They Hatin'"

=== Smoke DZA - Sweet Baby Kushed God ===
- "SMV" ft. Mookie Jones & Domo Genesis

=== M.A.T.H. ===
- "No Trespassin"

=== Frank Math ===
- "It's All There"

=== Young Lace - Cruise Control ===
Sources:

- "Moneygram" (ft. KTB)
- "Sippin Champagne"
- "Never Sleep"
- "Muscle Bars" (feat. KTB & Inner G)

=== Waka Flocka Flame - Ten Seventeen Bricksquad ===
- "I'm Just Livin Life"

=== SL Jones - The Number 23 ===
- "Michael Jordan"

=== Calico Jonez and T.K. 100Rackz ===
- "Firebirdz"

=== Young Cazal and DJ Fletch - Im on my Way ===
- "Regardless"

=== So Tatted Boys ===
- "So Cold" (ft. So Tatted Sharky)

=== Privilege - The Playbook ===
- "This The Life" (ft. Waka Flocka Flame)

=== Killa Kyleon - Candy Paint N Texas Plates 2 (Hosted by DJ Rapid Ric) ===
- "Bodies Hit The Floor" (feat. Bun B)

=== Pricele$$ ===
- "First 48"

=== Trae The Truth - 48 Hours ===
- "Earthquake"

=== Da Kid - Bad Boys for Life ===
- "No Subliminals" (ft. Slim Dunkin)

=== Lil Twist - The Golden Child ===
- "Light Up"
- "Reckless"

=== Bo Deal - Good Side Bad Side ===
- "What Up"

== 2012 ==
=== J Money - Who Shot Ya ===
- "Bags" (ft. MPA Wicked)

=== Fat Trel ===
- "Fukkk Da Feds" (ft. Chief Keef)

=== Jody Breeze - Airplane Mode ===
- "Problem" (ft. Zed Zilla)

=== Chevy Woods - Gangland ===
- "12 Rounds"
- "Vice" (feat. Juicy J & Wiz Khalifa)
- "36" (ft. Trae The Truth)

=== MellowHigh ===
- "Timbs"

=== JD Era - No Handouts ===
- "Yoga Flame"
- "Smoking Good"

=== Styles P - The Diamond Life Project ===
- "YO Trill Sheet" (ft. Sheek Louch & Bun B)

=== 2WIN - Imagine ===
- "MLK"

=== Ghosty Lowks - Sick City Volume 1 ===
- "Bustin"

=== Vinny Chase - Survival of the Swag ===
- "Urban Outfitters"

=== Chief Keef - For Greater Glory Vol. 1 ===
- "Russian Roulette" (featuring Fat Trel)

=== Rick Ross - Rich Forever ===
- "Off The Boat" (featuring French Montana)

=== EMP Dasme - Lakeshore Living ===
- "Lil Mama"

=== Schoolboy Q - Habits and Contradictions ===
- "Grooveline Pt. 1" (featuring Curren$y & Dom Kennedy)

=== Chip tha Ripper - Tell Ya Friends ===
- "Out Here"

=== Yo Gotti - Live From The Kitchen ===
- "Second Chance"

=== YG Hootie - Fonk Love (Flight to da Motherland) ===
- "Puttin' In Work"
- "Everything Bricksquad"

=== Project Pat and Nasty Mane - Belly On Full ===
- "Money Mane" (featuring 2 Chainz & Tatalalicious)

=== Doe Boy - Since 1994 Pt. 2 ===
- "Since 1994 Pt.2""
- "It's Whatever" (featuring Sean Teezy)

=== Trap Music: Gorilla Warfare (Hosted by Gorilla Zoe) ===
- "Spit In Yo Face" (performed by Gorilla Zoe)

=== King Louie - Showtime ===
- "Feelin' Like A Big Check"

=== Tay Don - Death of Tay Beatz 2 (Tay Dons Day of Wreckoning) ===
- "Get Ur Thug On"
- It's Goin' Down"
- Throw Up Ur Set"
- "Triple Dare"
- "Shootout"
- "Don't Blow My High"

=== French Montana, Juicy J and Project Pat - Cocaine Mafia ===
- "Catch Ya Later"
- "Is You Kiddin Me" (featuring DJ Paul)

=== Tarvoria - Bedroom Bangers ===
- "Jumpin' Off The Dresser"

=== Tay Don - M.A.F.I.A. ===
- "Salute"
- "Comfortable Darkness"

=== Wooh Da Kid - Strap-A-Holics 2.0 (Reloaded) ===
- "Bricksquad Diva" (featuring Waka Flocka Flame, Slim Dunkin and Gucci Mane)

=== Wiz Khalifa - Taylor Allderdice ===
- "The Code" (featuring Juicy J, Lola Monroe & Chevy Woods)

=== Mac Miller - Macadelic ===
- "Lucky Ass Bitch'" (featuring Juicy J)

=== Bo Deal and Co Still - Niggaz You Love To Hate ===
- "Not A Game" (featuring BFN)

=== Game - California Republic ===
- "Death Penalty'" (featuring Fabolous, Slim Thug and Eric Bellinger)
- "Bottles And Rockin' J's'" (Remix) (featuring Busta Rhymes, Rick Ross, Fabolous, Lil Wayne and Teyana Taylor)

=== Ice Burgandy - Progress Involves Risk Unfortunately ===
- "My Benz'" (featuring Wooh Da Kid, P Smurf and Waka Flocka Flame)

=== French Montana and Coke Boys - Coke Boys 3 ===
- "9000 Watts '"

=== GE Da Piolet - Project F16 ===
- "Mission"
- "Hold Me Down"

=== MellowHigh ===
- "Timbs'"

=== Juicy J - Blue Dream and Lean (Bonus Track) ===
- "I'm Ballin'"

=== Gucci Mane - I'm Up ===
- "Spread the Word"

=== Lil Wyte - Still Doubted? ===
- "All Kinds Of Drugs" (featuring Young Buck and Lil Wil) (Produced with Big BOI Beats)
- "Welcome 2 the Gathering" (featuring Lord Infamous and Liquid Assassin) (Produced with Wyte Music Rec)
- "Money" (featuring Miss Wyte, Partee, and Project Pat)
- "Lost In My Zone"

=== Waka Flocka Flame - Triple F Life: Friends, Fans and Family ===
- "Triple F Life (Intro)" (with Southside)
- "Round of Applause" (featuring Drake)
- "Triple F Life (Outro)" (with Southside)

=== Doe Boy - Paid in Full ===
- "Respect My Fresh"

=== CyHi The Prynce - Ivy League Club ===
- "Real Talk" (featuring Dose)

=== Sergei Barracuda - Pouliční Ekonomická II ===
- "Šéfuju"
- "Monte Carlo" (featuring Smack)
- "Ice Cube"

=== Big Sean - Detroit ===
- "FFOE"

=== V.A.B.P. - Young Nigga Movement 2 ===
- "Tonight"
- "Hearse"
- "Unf*ckwitable"
- "Whip Da Shake" (featuring Fat Trel)
- "Smoke a Joint"
- "Choppa Lay 'Em Down" (featuring Juicy J)
- "Molly" (featuring Neal Da Hitman)
- "Crash the Party"
- "Fucked Up" (featuring Fam-Lay)
- "O Well (Remix)"
- "How You Gone Act"
- "Hello Goodbye" (featuring Neal Da Hitman)
- "Ciroc Boyz"

=== Fat Trel - Nightmare on E Street ===
- "Geetchie"
- "Rollin" (featuring Rich Hil)

=== Zone 6 Sinister - The Sixth Sense ===
- "Death Before Dishonesty"

=== Future - Invade The Game ===
- "Fettuccine" (ft. Pusha T & Emilio Rojas)

=== Chief Keef - Determined to Hustle 4 ===
- "Clap" ft. (Bo Deal & Uncle Murda)

== 2013 ==
=== G.E. Da Piolet - I.C.O.N. ===
- "Mission (Remix)" (ft. Bo Deal)
- "Raw & Uncut"

=== Riff Raff ===
- "Raiders Vs. Hawks"

=== Zone 6 Sinister - Zone 6 Stephen King ===
- "Spring Time" (feat. Pakktrick Peezy)

=== Styles P - Freestyle Massacre (Hosted by DJ Ben Frank) ===
- "Enjoy The Atmosphere" (ft. Chris Rivers & Tyler Woods)

=== YS FXXL - Tatted B4 The Deal ===
- "999"

=== Yung Chuck - Bouta Boom ===
- "Boom"

=== ikabodVeins - FUCK$ ===
Sources:

- "Intro"
- "FUCK$"
- "Oh My God"
- "Bogus"
- "Derringer 22"
- "96 Impala SS"
- "Break Lights"
- "That's My Shit" (feat. Griff)

=== Cartel MGM - Cartel MGM and Lex Luger - Down South Mex ===
- "Intro"
- "Down South Mex"
- "Clika De La Kush/ Kush Clique"
- "Feeling Good"
- "Bitch Get Off Me"
- "I Bet "
- "Big Faces" (feat. Young Dolph)
- "Bands Up"
- "Hollywood" (feat. Yowda)
- "Take His Head Off His Shoulders" (feat. Project Pat)
- "Circle Small"
- "Never Change"
- "In & Out The Door"
- "Do You Feel Me?"
- "Outro"

=== Project Pat - Cheez N Dope ===
- "Niggas Bleed Like I Bleed"
- "You Kno What It Is"

=== Cyhi The Prynce - Ivy League: Kick Back ===
- "Far Removed"

=== Curren$y - New Jet City ===
- "Choosin" (featuring Wiz Khalifa & Rick Ross)
- "Coolie in the Cut" (featuring Trademark da Skydiver)

=== Waka Flocka Flame - DuFlocka Rant 2 ===
- "Stay Hood" (featuring Lil Wayne)
- "Fell" (featuring Gucci Mane & Young Thug)
- "Real Recognize Real"

=== M Watts - The Layover EP ===
- "Liberachi" (featuring Pusha T)

=== Gucci Mane and Young Scooter - Free Bricks 2 ===
- "Pass Around" (featuring Wale)

=== Gucci Mane - Trap God 2 ===
- "Scholar"

=== Gucci Mane and Young Dolph - EastAtlantaMemphis ===
- "I Ain't Even Gonna Lie"
- "On The Run"
- "Tell Me Nothin"

=== OJ da Juiceman - 6 Ringz 2 (The Playoffs Edition) ===
- "Run Them Bands Up"
- "Ballin Out The Gym" (featuring Starlito)

=== French Montana - Excuse My French ===
- "40" (featuring Trey Songz & Fabolous)

=== Travis Scott - Owl Pharaoh ===
- "M.I.A."

=== Gucci Mane - Trap House III ===
- "Can't Trust Her" (featuring Rich Homie Quan)

=== Big Bank Black - The Godfather ===
- "Forgiato's" (featuring Gucci Mane)

=== Blood Money - Drug Wars ===
- "GBSB"

=== Doe Boy - In Freebandz We Trust ===
- "Band God"

=== Ricky Hil - Slickville 2 ===
- "Off Probation"

=== The Underachievers - Lords of Flatbush ===
- "Leaving Scraps"
- "Flexin"
- "Cold Crush"
- "Still Shining"
- "Fake Fans"

=== Fredo Santana - Ballout - From The Streets ===
- "Street Niggas" (featuring Ballout and Gino Marley)

=== Fredo Santana - Trappin Ain't Dead ===
- "Clockwork"
- "Came Up From Nothing"
- "Ring Bells"

=== Juicy J - Stay Trippy ===
- "So Much Money" (co-produced by Crazy Mike and Juicy J)
- "All I Blow is Loud"
- "If I Ain't"

=== King Chip - 44108 ===
- "Stand Up King"
- "It's Real" (featuring Fat Trel)

=== Gucci Mane - Diary of a Trap God ===
- "She a Soldier" (featuring Rich Homie Quan)

=== Rich Homie Quan - I Promise I Will Never Stop Going In ===
- "Cash Money" (featuring Birdman) (co-produced by Metro Boomin)

=== Fredo Santana - Its A Scary Site 2 ===
- "No Hook"

=== Spodee - No Pressure 2 ===
- "Intro"

== 2014 ==
=== King Phil ===
- "Long Way"

=== Zach Farlow - The Great Escape ===
- "Fukk Around"

=== Rick Ross - Hood Billionaire ===
- "Hood Billionaire" (co-produced by Deedotwill)

=== Chief Keef - Single ===
- "Save Me"

=== Young Money Entertainment - Young Money: Rise of an Empire ===
- "Back It Up"

=== Low Pros - Low Pros EP 1 ===
- "Intro"
- "100 Bottles" (Feat. Travi$ Scott) [Prod.with By A-Trak]
- "Frankie Lymon" (Feat. Que, Young Thug & PeeWee Longway) [Prod. with A-Trak]
- "Ohmygosh" [Prod. with A-Trak, Metro Boomin, High Klassified & Brillz]
- "Jack Tripper" (Feat. Young Thug & PeeWee Longway) [Prod. with A-Trak, & Metro Boomin]
- "Muscle" (Feat. Juvenile) [Prod. with A-Trak, Metro Boomin & High Klassified]
- "100 Bottles (Remix)" (Feat. Travi$ Scott & A$AP Ferg) [Prod. with A-Trak]

=== Young Dolph - - High Class Street Music 4 (American Gangster) ===
- "Not No More" (co-produced by Metro Boomin)

=== DJ P Exclusivez - No Record Deal 3 ===
- "Bape" (HiRULE)
- "Red Nation" (Fat Sauce ft. Bloody Jay)

=== Chinx Drugz - Cocaine Riot 4 ===
- "Let's Get it" ft. Young Thug

=== Lex Luger ===
- "Legal" ft. Gangsta Boo
- "Foreign"
- "Poppin Percs" (ft. HighDefRazJah & Lipso)
- "#100"
- "Not Cool" (ft. Rari) [Prod. by UrBoyBlack]
- "Randy Moss" (ft. Marlo Margiela) [Prod by. Jokaa]
- "Off The Drugs" Young Cartel feat. Chella H & Lex Luger
- "TUK (Turn Up Kings)" (feat. HighDefrazjah)
- "Stripper Booty" (ft. J-Roc) (Produced by KinoBeats)

=== MPA Shitro - Son of a Bricc Lady ===
- "Dead and Gone" (co-produced with 808 Mafia)

=== Young Eddy - Welcome to a New Beginning ===
- "How It Goes" (ft. G.U.N MSE)

=== Zone 6 Sinister - No Day Off ===
- "No Day Off"

=== UrBoyBlack ===
- "Why" - (ft. J Roc)

=== Rich the Kid - Streets On Lock IV ===
- "Workin" (ft. Casey Veggies)

=== Neako - The Xan Band EP ===
- "Super Xan Bros" ft. The Clouds & Young Musis
- "xanLAND Airlines"
- "LVLLEX"

=== Reese Kool ===
- "Bubble" ft. Shy Glizzy

=== Gucci Mane - Brick Factory Vol. 2 ===
- "Stay Down" (feat. Rocko)

=== Ace Santana - I Am Ace Santana ===
- "No Hook"

=== Hunter - Hunter Perry ===
- "Rally"

=== King Kuma ===
- "On Star"

=== La Melle Robinson - War of the Worlds ===
- "I'm Not The Same"

=== Dre Loco ===
- "Hustle Hard 2K14"

=== DayMoe ===
- "How We Live" (ft. Lil Jay)

=== Mack Maine - Food For Thought ===
- "Living All Of Your Dreams" ft. (2 Chainz & Mac Miller)

=== Frank Whyte and Pop-A-Lot - The Kush Administration ===
- "Ride High"

=== Deaveru ===
- "Mario Kart"
- "Shutter Island"

=== Rico Ramone - Signed and Sealed ===
- "Goin In"

=== DayMoe - First Assault ===
- "Get Paid" (ft. Lil Jay)

=== Doe Bear and Milli Marley - Mobbin ===
- "Long Hair Fatty"

=== Whiteboy Tommy ===
- "One Thing About Me" (feat. A-Wax)
- "Living That Life"

=== Sheila D - Grand By Design ===
- "Thunder" (ft. Lex Luger and Marlo Margiela)

=== OG Maco - OG Maco ===
- "Seizure" (ft. JerZ) (co-produced with Deedotwill)

== 2015 ==
=== Marlo Margiela ===
- "Throw A Fit" (feat. Lex Luger & P Wild)
- "We On Now" (feat. Lex Luger)
- "Never fall in Love" (feat. Lex Luger)
- "Freebase" (feat. Fattrel)
- "Faces"
- "Doprah"
- "Last Year" (feat. Lil Durk)

=== Whiteboy Tommy - Hollywood Stories: The Prelude ===
- "All I Do"
- "The Motive"
- "One Of Those Days"

=== Neako - #Junkie ===
- "Look At The Time" (co-produced with TM88)

=== Juicy J - O's To Oscars ===
- "Disrespectin" (co-produced with Juicy J, Lil Awree, & Crazy Mike)

=== Kris Dutney ===
- "MIA"
- "Ocean" (ft. Lex Luger)

=== Keez Moni - Harold's Chicken and Kush Blunts ===
- "Ride Smooth"

=== J. Money - Sauce 4 Sale ===
- "Let's Do It" (feat. Frenchie)

=== JayyRaw ===
- "I Know" (co-produced with 808 Mafia)

=== Gandhi ===
- "Hare Krishna"

=== Hakim Lemon Haze - Adromicfms 2 ===
- "LA Diferencia" (ft. Yung Beef)

=== Pyrobethename - Egyptian God ===
- "My Sins" (co-produced by Reaperonthatrack)

=== HighDefRazjah - Drug Habits ===
- "Movie Star"

=== Kourtney Money and Young Nudy - Paradise 2 East Atlanta ===
- "My Nigga" (ft. D.R.E.)

=== Katie Got Bandz - Zero to 39th ===
- "A1" (ft. OTF Savage)

=== C. Carter - Compton Carter ===
- "West"
- "Goin Up"

=== Kourtney Money - The Return of Money (Zone 6 Edition) ===
- "9 On Me"

=== Young Cartel ===
- "Homicide" (ft. Cartel Kapo)

=== Franco Gianni ===
- "Xolos"

=== Slim B ===
- "Hood Billionaire"

=== Key Nyata - Indiana Facers ===
- "Thraxx On Me"

=== Lex Luger ===
- "MVP" (ft. HighDefRazjah) [Prod. By Mike Mizzle]
- "4:57 AM" (ft. King Duke) [Prod. By Mike Mizzle]
- "#WeOnTV" (ft. Lipso) [Prod. By Deedotwill and MVCK]
- "Selfish" (ft. Lex Luger, Yung Kris, King Duke, and KapBoy)

=== King Kuma and Lex Luger - Gas-A-Holic 2 ===
- "CreatureStyle Intro" (feat. Creature)
- "Lex Luger Speaks"
- "Gold Mine" (feat. Lex Luger)
- "Robert Earl House"
- "OnStar"
- "Loft" (Feat. Petey Mo & Young Chevy)
- "Lex Luger Speaks 2"
- "In Da Wurl" (feat. Young Chevy)
- "Unattractive" (feat. Project Pat)
- "Errythang About Her"
- "Lex Luger Speaks 3"
- "GASoLEAN"
- "Early"
- "Glacier"
- "Lex Luger Speaks 4"
- "Really Been"
- "Like 50K" (feat. King Kuma)
- "Curtains" (feat. Rich The Kid & Casey Veggies)
- "Bubba"
- "Disguise" (feat. Tago)
- "Time" (feat. Brandon Cain)

=== OJ da Juiceman - The Realest Nigga I Know 2 ===
- "Work"
- "Hot Tamale"

=== Rick Ross - TBA ===
- "Dog Food"

=== Cartel Kapo - Thousand Pounds ===
- "Intro (Get Sum Money)"
- "Touch Down"
- "RIP"
- "In Da Trap"
- "YNG"
- "Choppa Make You Dead"
- "What You No"
- "Time"
- "Cash Out"
- "Outro"
- "Homicide" (feat. Young Cartel)

=== Juicy J - 100% Juice ===
- "Details" (co-produced with TM88)
- "Touch Da Sky First" (co-produced with Metro Boomin, Sonny Digital, Southside & Crazy Mike)

=== Yung Kris ===
- "Lean With The Xanis"

=== Father - Someone Get These New Niggas ===
- "Alleyoop Swish" (ft. LuiDiamonds)

=== J Roc ===
- "Dope" (ft. Milli)

=== KapboyDaMacboy ===
- "Rare"

=== Gucci Mane - East Atlanta Santa 2 ===
- "Prey" (ft. Waka Flocka Flame and OG Maco)
- "What it Takes" (ft. Vic Mensa and Bandman Kavo)

=== Lil Uzi Vert - "LUV Is Rage" ===
- "7 AM"

== 2016 ==
=== GC54PROD and Lex Luger GotInstrumentals x GC54PROD 2 ===
- "GC & Lex" instrumental 131BPM (produced with GC54PROD)
- "Deadly zone" instrumental 140BPM (produced with GC54PROD)
- "Masters at work" instrumental 140BPM (produced with GC54PROD)
- "Let's Crunk this Trap!!" instrumental 137BPM (produced with GC54PROD)
- "Rollin" 142BPM instrumental 142BPM (produced with GC54PROD)
- "GC54 Team" (feat. Alibi Montana x Devil B x R.E.D x Setekh x Jokno Condor) (produced with GC54PROD)

=== Wiz Khalifa - Khalifa ===
- "Bake Sale" (feat. Travis Scott & Juicy J) (produced with TM88 & DJ Spinz)

=== Big Biz Da MC ===
- "Agent P"

=== Trill Murray ===
- "R∆ POWER"

=== Young Crazy and Breeze Barker - Count Dat Money 7 (Hosted By OJ Da Juiceman) ===
- "Hallway" (produced with DJ Kino Beats)

=== Juicy J - RBB3 ===
- "No English" (feat. Travis Scott) (produced with TM88)

=== PHRHX - Prologue ===
- "Good A$$ Time"

=== Little Pain ===
- "Ashamed Of Myself" (ft. Lil Peep) (produced with Rob Makes Bangers and Smokeasac)

=== Lex Luger ===
- "Movie" (ft. J-Real and Mi$tro) (Produced by Karma)
- "Marlo Margiela - Never Fall In Love" ft Lex Luger

=== Ricky Hil and Lex Luger - 500 Grams ===
- "Half a P"
- "Born In the 90's"
- "Cherry Pie" (ft. Smoked DZA)
- "500 Grams "
- "Varieties" (feat. Ro Ransom)
- "Ring Around the Rosie"
- "What's Poppin"
- "Baby Mix It Up"
- "Dippin"
- "Show Money" (feat. Bonic)
- "Bout It 'Bout It"

=== Lex Luger - The Lex Luger Experience: The Tour Vol. 1 ===
- "Lex Luger Experience: The Tour, Vol. 1" (ft. Kino Beats)
- "White Bars 6"
- "Base Side"
- "Movie" (ft. Kino Beats)
- "White Bars 8"
- "Backwoods"
- "The OG"
- "Commas" (ft. HighDefRazjah & KinoBeats)
- "Epic Lives" (ft. Markino Hay & KinoBeats)
- "Lex Kino Black" (ft. KinoBeats & UrBoyBlack)
- "Cocaine" (ft. Trama Tone & KinoBeats)

=== ASAP Ferg - Always Strive and Prosper ===
- "Let It Bang" (ft. Schoolboy Q)

=== HighDefRazjah - Psychedelic ===
- "The Art of Psyche"
- "Swervin Lanes"
- "Arenas"

=== Hefna Gwap ===
- "When I Get Some Dope"

=== WhiteboyTommy - YNS: Young N Successful ===
- "The Only Thing"
- "Gwop Getta"

=== Malcolm Anthony and Lex Luger - 1804 ===
- "Like Me"
- "Game Recognize Game"
- "The Oath" (ft. Terry Mak)
- "Finally"

=== G.O.O.D. Music - Cruel Winter ===
- "Champions" (Kanye West featuring Travis $cott, Quavo, Gucci Mane, Yo Gotti, Big Sean, 2 Chainz & Desiigner) (produced with A-Trak, Hit-Boy, Charlie Heat & Mike Dean)

=== JPrice ===
- "3 AM"

=== Drama Boi ===
- "Deadman"

=== Lil Champ FWAY ===
- "Coconut Grove" (produced with LoudMouf Kang)

=== Larry June - Good Job Larry Pt. 2 ===
- "B.A.B." (ft. OG Maco & Chevy Woods)

=== Malcolm Anthony ===
- "Finally"

=== RetroI$Awesome - 72-10 ===
- "Count It Up" (produced with K3YFLO & R$A)
- "Swi$H" (produced with K3YFLO)
- "Whenever I Wanna" (produced with K3YFLO)
- "4 in a 2" (produced with K3YFLO)
- "All We Do" (produced with K3YFLO)
- "Breakin The Law" (produced with K3YFLO)

=== Eddy Baker ===
- "ROWDY" (produced with ROBMAKESBANGERS)

=== V.A.B.P. - V.A.B.P. - Pre Game ===
- "Real Nigga"
- "Ball Out"
- "Don't Lose Ya Life" (produced with Metro Boomin)

=== Almighty Dip - DipLLuminati : The 7 Day Theory ===
- "Pass Around"

=== Curtis Williams - Danco SZN ===
- "No Reason"

=== Juicy J - #MUSTBENICE ===
- "Trap" (ft. Gucci Mane and Peewee Longway) (produced with TM88)
- "Plenty" (ft. Que) (produced with Metro Boomin)

=== OJ da Juiceman - Math Class ===
- "Mudd" (produced with Jonay)

=== Fresh Moss - Skinny Fresco 2 ===
- "Insomniac"

=== Curtis Williams - #DancoSZN ===
- "No Reason"

=== Taylor J and Lex Luger Presents - The 91Family ===
- "'91 Family Forever"
- "Dawg"
- "Pop Dat"
- "Hard Ta Luv"
- "Do For Me"
- "Hotel"
- "HighLight"
- "Workin"

=== GC54 ===
- "Masters at Work"

=== Les Anticipateurs - La Coupe ===
- "Paradis"

=== Les Anticipateurs - Match des Étoiles ===
- "NOUVEAU"

=== Kevin Hart - Kevin Hart: What Now? ===
- "Baller Alert" (ft. Migos & T.I)

=== Princess Nokia - 1992 ===
- 03. "Kitana" (produced with A-Trak)

=== Devereaux - Casualties ===
- 03. "Casualties" (ft. Ramirez, 6Cardinal, Shaggy, and Splxffy) (produced with Devereaux)

== 2017 ==
=== Chief Keef - Two Zero One Seven ===
- 1."So Tree"* (Co- Produced with Suber)
- 4."Reefah"*
- 6."Short" ft. Tadoe* (Co- Produced with Suber)
- 11."Control" (ft. Tadoe)*

=== Taylor J ===
- "Petty"
- "Down"
- "Feelings"

=== Curren$y and Lex Luger - The Motivational Speech EP ===
- "Get To It"
- "Lavender"
- "In The Lot"
- "Pressure"
- "I Know"

=== Lil Yachty - Teenage Emotions ===
- "All Around Me" (Ft. YG & Kamaiyah)

== 2018 ==
=== Chief Keef - Ottopsy (EP) ===
- "Gang Gang"

=== Rico Nasty - Nasty ===
- "Transformer"

== 2019 ==
=== Jeezy - TM104: The Legend of the Snowman ===
- "MLK BLVD" (featuring Meek Mill)

=== A.U. WOOD - Summer's Mine (EP) ===
- "Run It Part II" (featuring Sai What)

=== Gucci Mane - Woptober II ===
- "Richer than Errybody" (featuring YoungBoy Never Broke Again and DaBaby)

== 2020 ==
=== Juicy J - The Hustle Continues ===
- "Gah Damn High" (featuring Wiz Khalifa)

produced with Juicy J

== 2021 ==
=== MVW ===
- "Still Do" (featuring Valee)

co-produced with MVW

=== Teejayx6 - Generation Scam (EP) ===
- "Triler"
- "EDD Baby" (ft. 24hrs)
- "Hit Stick"
- "Dumpin'"
- "Shoot"
- "Too Loyal" (ft. Boldy James)

EP produced by Lex Luger

== 2022 ==
=== King Chip - Bonfire ===
- "Don't You See I'm on the Phone!?"
- "No, YOU Keep Cool"
- "All I Know"
- "Hurtin' They Feelings"
- "Blue Hunnets"
- "BussIt"
- "Acting Brand New"
- "Do Some Damage"

All tracks produced by Lex Luger

== 2023 ==
=== Lex Luger, GC54PROD - The Professionals ===
- "Gc And Lex 2"
- "Next Level"
- "Next Level (Speed Up)"
- "Auto-Reverse"
- "Auto-Reverse (Speed Up)"
- "New Order"
- "Beef"
- "Lil'Blade"
- "Lil'Blade (Speed Up)"
- "STFU"
- "Cobra"
- "Cobra (Speed Up)"
- "Cold Turkey"
- "WarGame"
- "WarGame (Speed Up)"
- "True Last Boss"
- "True Last Boss (Speed Up)"

All tracks produced by Lex Luger and GC54PROD, except "Cobra" and "Cobra (Speed Up)" produced by GC54PROD.

=== Wiz Khalifa - Good Burger 2 (Original Motion Picture Soundtrack) ===
- 2. "No Fair"

Produced by Lex Luger & Chad Hugo

=== YoungBoy Never Broke Again - Decided 2 ===
- 7. Better Than Ever (ft. Rod Wave)
