= Body bag (disambiguation) =

A Body bag is a bag designed to hold a human corpse.

Body bag may also refer to:

- Body bag, when a pickleball player drives the ball into an opponent's body
- Body Bag, a series of song tracks by Ace Hood
- Body Bag Game, an American football played in 1990
- Body Bag match, in professional wrestling
- Bodybag, a Marvel Comics character and member of Technet

== See also ==
- Body Bags (disambiguation)
