= We Outchea =

Single by Ace Hood featuring Lil Wayne

from the album Trials & Tribulations
- Released: June 11, 2013
- Recorded: 2012
- Genre: Hip hop
- Length: 4:20
- Label: We the Best; Cash Money; Republic
- Songwriters: Antoine McColister; Dwayne Carter; Anthony Norris
- Producer: Lee on the Beats

Ace Hood singles chronology
"Bugatti" (2013)	"We Outchea" (2013)	"Bomb Bomb" (2014)

Lil Wayne singles chronology
"Wit' Me" (2013)	"We Outchea" (2013)	"Beware" (2013)

Music video
- "We Outchea" on YouTube

"We Outchea" is a song by American rapper Ace Hood from his fourth studio album, Trials & Tribulations. It was released on June 11, 2013, by We the Best Music Group, Cash Money Records and Republic Records, as the second single from the album. The song, produced by Lee on the Beats, features a guest appearances by Lil Wayne. The song peaked at number 19 on the Billboard Bubbling Under Hot 100 chart.

== Background ==
The song was premiered on May 14, 2013, when it was announced as the second single from Trials & Tribulations. It was released to iTunes on June 11, 2013.

== Critical reception ==
XXL praised the single, calling it "triumphant". On the other hand, HipHopDX called the Lil Wayne guest appearance "inevitable" and said the song had a "lackluster appeal", that Wayne makes fade even more. The song's sound was compared to the previous Ace Hood and Lil Wayne collaboration "Hustle Hard".

== Music video ==
The music video for "We Outchea", directed by Colin Tilley, was filmed in mid-June, with a behind-the-scenes video being released on June 18, 2013. The full video was released on June 29, 2013. It had cameo appearances by DJ Khaled and Birdman. Up to April 2021, it had had over 10 million views.

== Charts ==
Chart (2013)	Peak position
US Bubbling Under Hot 100 (Billboard)	19
US Hot R&B/Hip-Hop Songs (Billboard)	49

== Release history ==
Country	Date	Format	Label
United States	May 27, 2013	Urban contemporary music radio	We the Best, Cash Money, Republic
United States	June 5, 2013	Digital download	We the Best, Cash Money, Republic
United States	June 25, 2013	Rhythmic contemporary radio	We the Best, Cash Money, Republic
