= Blood, Sweat & Tears (Ace Hood album) =

Studio album by Ace Hood
- Released: August 9, 2011
- Recorded: 2009–11
- Genre: Hip-hop
- Length: 48:28
- Label: We the Best; Def Jam
- Producer: Young Fyre; Lex Luger; Schife; The Lottery; J.U.S.T.I.C.E. League; Sonny Digital; Cardiak; The Runners; The Monarch; The Renegades; White Hot; OhZee

Ace Hood chronology
Ruthless (2009)	Blood, Sweat & Tears (2011)	Trials & Tribulations (2013)

Singles from Blood, Sweat & Tears
- 1. "Hustle Hard" Released: March 1, 2011; 2. "Go n Get It" Released: June 14, 2011; 3. "Body 2 Body" Released: July 26, 2011

Professional ratings
Review scores
Source	Rating
AllMusic	4/5 stars
HipHopDX	2.5/5 stars
XXL	3/5 stars

Blood, Sweat & Tears is the third studio album by American rapper Ace Hood. The album was released on August 9, 2011, by We the Best Music Group and Def Jam Recordings. The album was recorded from 2009 to 2011, and was produced by Lex Luger, J.U.S.T.I.C.E. League, Sonny Digital, and The Runners, alongside others. The album features guest appearances from T-Pain, Yo Gotti, Chris Brown, Kevin Cossom, Rick Ross and Lil Wayne, with its deluxe edition featuring additional guest appearances from Beanie Sigel, Busta Rhymes, Pusha T, and Styles P.

The album was promoted with three singles. The first, "Hustle Hard", was released on the 1st of March, 2011, and was Hood's first single to make the Billboard Hot 100 since 2008's "Ride" (featuring Trey Songz). An official remix appears as the final track to the album's standard edition, and was later released as a single on the 10th of May, 2011. The second single, "Go n Get It", was released on the 14th of June, 2011. An official remix appears as the final track to the album's deluxe edition, while other remixes were made by Tyga, Gudda Gudda, and 2 Chainz. The third single, "Body 2 Body" (featuring Chris Brown), was released on the 26th of July, 2011, and served as Hood's highest charting single on both the Hot R&B/Hip-Hop Songs and Hot Rap Songs chart.

Upon its release, the album became Hood's first top-10 entry on the US Billboard 200, peaking at number 8 on the chart and selling 26,000 copies within its first week, making it Hood's most successful project by then. It also topped the Top R&B/Hip-Hop Albums and Top Rap Albums charts in the United States. The album would be promoted with Hood's first headlining concert tour, the Hustle Hard tour, named after the song of the same name, which appears on the album. It was further promoted with a deluxe edition, featuring five additional bonus tracks. "Hustle Hard" would later be nominated in the Best Club Banger category at the BET Hip Hop Awards, with its remix also being nominated for Best Collaboration, Duo or Group at the award show.

== Singles ==
The album's first single, "Hustle Hard" was released on March 1, 2011. Upon its release, the single charted at number 60 on the Billboard Hot 100, becoming his first single to make the chart since "Ride" (featuring Trey Songz), from his debut studio album, Gutta (2008). It also reached the top 10 of the Hot R&B/Hip-Hop Songs and Hot Rap Songs charts, peaking at number 9 and 10 on the charts respectively. A music video was made for the song, directed by Gil Green. An official remix was also made of the song, featuring Rick Ross and Lil Wayne. The remix was released as a single on the 10th of May, 2011, and also received a music video, directed by Green. It additionally appeared as the final track to the album's standard track listing. Additional remixes were made by Obie Trice, Yo Gotti, Slim Thug, Jeezy, Joell Ortiz, Trey Songz, Jim Jones, Lil' Kim, and Meek Mill. At the 2011 BET Hip Hop Awards, the track was nominated in the Best Club Banger category, while its remix was nominated for Best Collaboration, Duo or Group, although Hood lost both awards.

The album's second single, "Go n Get It", was released on June 14, 2011. Upon its release, the single peaked at number 60 on the Hot R&B/Hip-Hop Songs chart. A music video for the track was released on the 5th of July, 2011. The video was directed by Dayo, and was shot in Hood's hometown of Broward County, Florida. An official remix was also made of the song, featuring Beanie Sigel, Busta Rhymes, Pusha T, and Styles P. It appears as the final bonus track to the album's deluxe edition. Additional remixes were curated by Tyga, Gudda Gudda, and 2 Chainz.

The album's third single, "Body 2 Body" (featuring Chris Brown), was released on July 26, 2011. Upon its release, it charted at number 65 on the Billboard Hot 100, and peaked at number 6 on the Hot R&B/Hip-Hop Songs and Hot Rap Songs charts, becoming his highest entry on the charts to date. The music video for "Body 2 Body" premiered on July 27, 2011, and was directed by Dayo. An official remix of the track was released on the 14th of November, 2011, and features additional vocals from Rick Ross, Wale, and DJ Khaled.

== Commercial performance ==
Upon its release, Blood, Sweat & Tears debuted at number 8 on the Billboard 200, with first-week sales of 26,000 copies in the United States. It also topped the Top R&B/Hip-Hop Albums and Top Rap Albums charts. By the end of 2011, the album was positioned at number 77 on the Top R&B/Hip-Hop Albums chart.

== Track listing ==
No.	Title	Writer(s)	Producer(s)	Length
1.	"King of the Streets" (featuring T-Pain)	Antoine McColister, Faheem Najm, Tramaine Winfrey, Jon A. Gordon, Michael A. Gordon	Young Fyre	3:15
2.	"Go n Get It"	A. McColister, Lexus Arnel Lewis	Lex Luger	3:56
3.	"Errrythang" (featuring Yo Gotti)	A. McColister, Mario Mims, Ian "Schife" Lewis, C. "The Lottery" Ray	Schife, The Lottery (co.)	4:19
4.	"Hustle Hard"	A. McColister, L. Lewis	Lex Luger	3:18
5.	"Body 2 Body" (featuring Chris Brown)	A. McColister, Kevin Cossom, Christopher M. Brown, Kevin Crowe, Erik Ortiz	J.U.S.T.I.C.E. League	3:55
6.	"Memory Lane" (featuring Kevin Cossom)	A. McColister, Kevin Cossom, S. Uwaezuoke, R. Brooks, J. Bristol	Sonny Digital	4:18
7.	"Letter to My Ex's"	A. McColister, Carl McCormick	Cardiak	4:58
8.	"Beautiful" (featuring Kevin Cossom)	A. McColister, Kevin Cossom, Andrew Harr, Jermaine Jackson	The Runners, The Monarch	3:07
9.	"Lord Knows"	A. McColister, B. Johnson, M. Riviere	The Renegades	4:38
10.	"Bitter World"	A. McColister, C. "The Lottery" Ray, C. Otis	The Lottery	3:57
11.	"Spoke to My Momma"	A. McColister, C. McCormick	Cardiak	4:00
12.	"Hustle Hard (Remix)" (featuring Rick Ross and Lil Wayne)	A. McColister, L. Lewis, William Roberts II, Dwayne Carter, Jr.	Lex Luger	4:45
Total length:				48:32

Deluxe edition (bonus tracks)
No.	Title	Writer(s)	Producer(s)	Length
13.	"Walk It Like I Talk It"	A. McColister, I. Lewis, Oscar "OhZee" Zayas	Schife, OhZee	3:32
14.	"I Know"	A. McColister, I. Lewis	Schife	3:52
15.	"Tear Da Roof Off"	A. McColister, S. Mahoney	White Hot	3:24
16.	"Real Big"	A. McColister, C. McCormick	Cardiak	3:17
17.	"Go n Get It (Remix)" (featuring Beanie Sigel, Busta Rhymes, Pusha T and Styles P)	A. McColister, L. Lewis, Dwight Grant, Trevor Smith, Jr., Terrence Thornton, David Styles	Lex Luger	6:06
Total length:				1:08:47

=== Notes ===
- (co.) as co-producer.

== Charts ==
=== Weekly charts ===
Chart (2011)	Peak position
US Billboard 200	8
US Top R&B/Hip-Hop Albums (Billboard)	1
US Top Rap Albums (Billboard)	1

=== Year-end charts ===
Chart (2011)	Position
US Top R&B/Hip-Hop Albums (Billboard)	77
