= Body Bags =

Body Bags may refer to:

- Body Bags (film), a 1993 horror / thriller TV movie directed by John Carpenter and Tobe Hooper
  - Body Bags (soundtrack), a soundtrack album from the film
- Body Bags (comics), a comic book series created, written and illustrated by Jason Pearson
- "Body Bags" (song), a song by rapper The Game
- Body Bags (novel), a 1999 novel by Christopher Golden

== See also ==
- Body bag (disambiguation)
