= Ace Hood =

American rapper (born 1988)

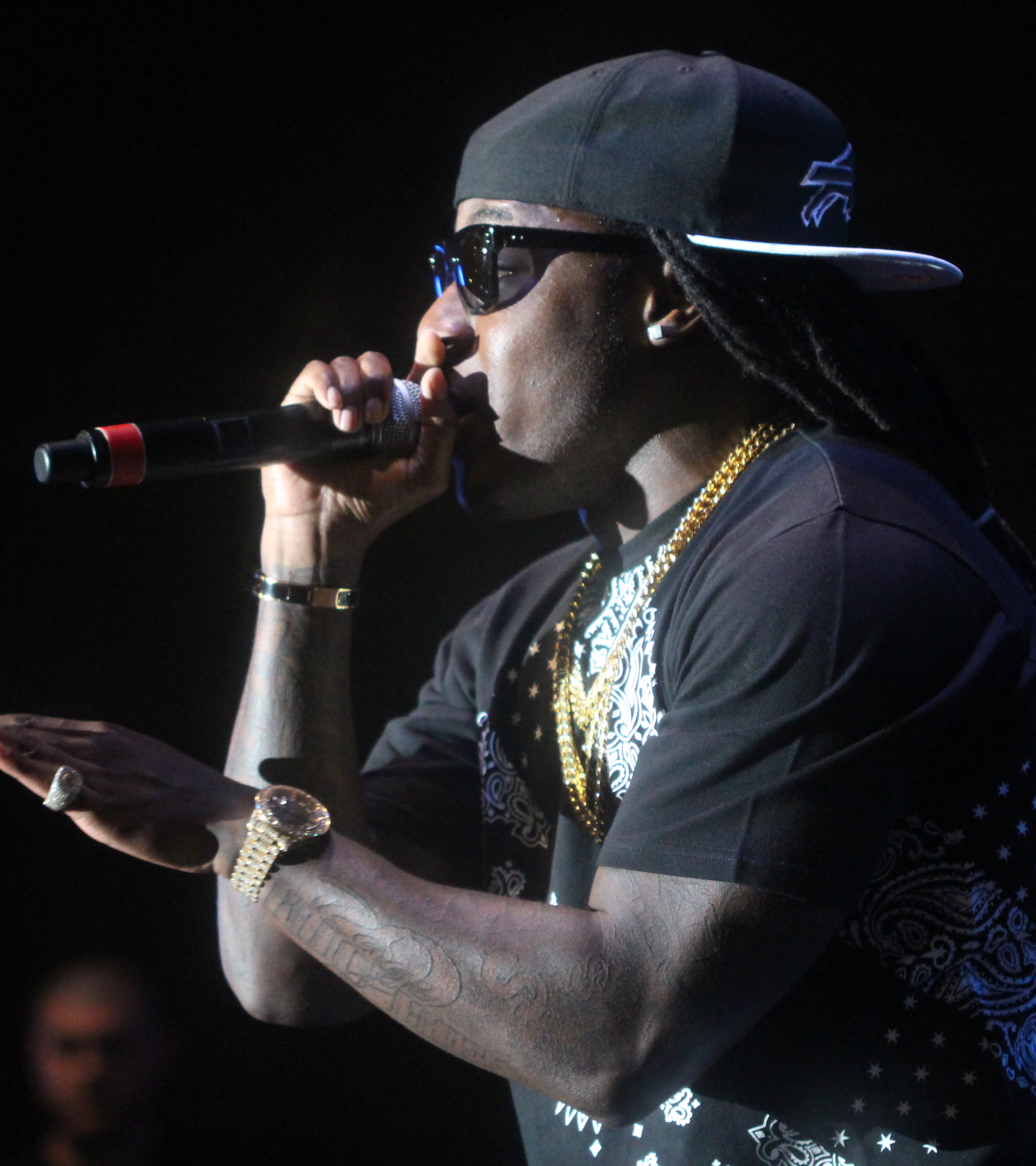
- Ace Hood performing in 2013

Background information
- Born: Antoine Franklin McColister; May 11, 1988 (age 38); Port St. Lucie, Florida, U.S.
- Origin: Deerfield Beach, Florida, U.S.
- Genre: Southern hip-hop
- Occupations: Rapper; actor; songwriter
- Works: Ace Hood discography
- Years active: 2005–present
- Labels: EMPIRE; Hood Nation; We the Best; Def Jam; Cash Money; Republic
- Spouse: Shelah Marie (m. 2020)
- Children: 2
- Website: www.acehoodmusic.com

Antoine Franklin McColister (born May 11, 1988), known professionally Ace Hood, is an American rapper. Born in Port St. Lucie and raised in Deerfield Beach, Florida, he was discovered by DJ Khaled and became the first act to sign with his record label, We the Best Music Group, in 2008. Released in a joint venture with Def Jam Recordings, his debut studio album, Gutta (2008), was met with moderate critical and commercial reception, but spawned his first Billboard Hot 100 entry, "Ride" (featuring Trey Songz).

His second album, Ruthless (2009), was met with similar reception. His third and fourth albums, Blood, Sweat & Tears (2011) and Trials & Tribulations (2013), both peaked within the top ten of the Billboard 200. The former was led by the single "Hustle Hard", while the latter was led by "Bugatti" (featuring Future and Rick Ross) — which peaked at numbers 60 and 33 on the Billboard Hot 100, respectively.

McColister parted ways with We the Best Music in 2016 in favor of an independent career.

== Early life ==
Ace Hood was born in Port St. Lucie, Florida. His mother is of Haitian origin. He was raised with his younger cousin Ty Barton Jr. in Deerfield Beach, part of Broward County. He graduated from Deerfield Beach High School.

Following a football injury in the 10th grade, and after realizing he would not be able to go pro, he began to consider rapping as a career. Hood teamed up with a local group called Dollaz & Dealz and released a single titled "M.O.E." in 2006. He also began promoting himself via open mic events and talent shows around town.

== Career ==
=== 2006–2008: Career beginnings and Gutta ===
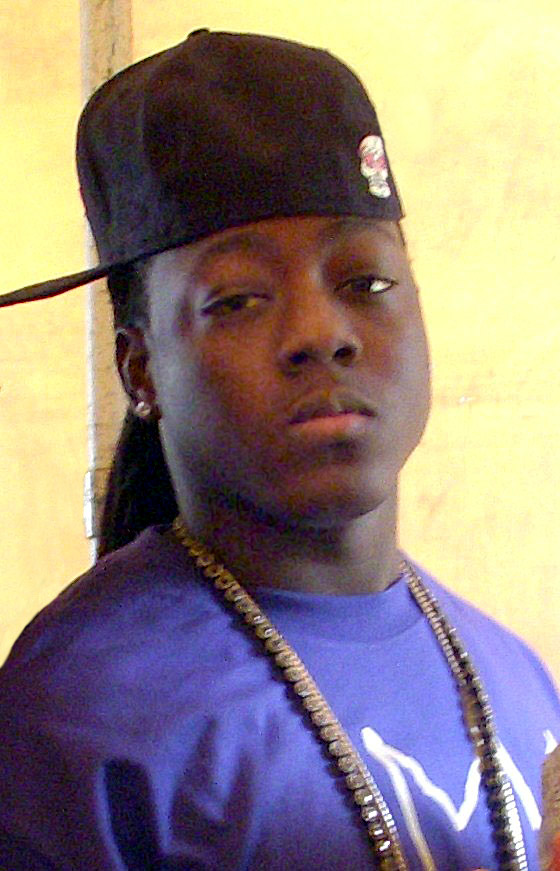
Ace Hood in 2008

In 2007, he met DJ Khaled outside the office of the WEDR 99 Jamz radio station. After Hood gave Khaled an autobiography and his demo tape, Khaled asked Hood to do a freestyle over the instrumental of his song "I'm So Hood" from his second album, We the Best, and later signed Hood to his We the Best Music Group label. Hood was named as one of the "Freshmen of '09" by XXL magazine.

His first album, Gutta, was released in 2008. Singles included "Cash Flow" featuring T-Pain and Rick Ross, and "Ride" featuring Trey Songz. Hood also released mixtapes called Ace Won't Fold and All Bets On Ace. He made a guest performance on DJ Khaled's single "Out Here Grindin'", also featuring Akon, Rick Ross, Plies, Lil Boosie and Trick Daddy, which peaked at number 38 on the Billboard Hot 100.

Hood appeared on Wildstyle Radio on WUAG 103.1FM in Greensboro, North Carolina, on September 7, 2008, to promote his album Gutta, along with DJ Khaled. The album debuted at number 36 on the Billboard 200, selling 25,000 copies its first week.

=== 2009–2012: Ruthless and Blood, Sweat, & Tears ===
On June 30, 2009, Hood released his second album, titled Ruthless, again on Def Jam. The album's first single was "Overtime", which was produced by The Runners and featured Akon and T-Pain. The album's second single was "Loco Wit The Cake", produced by Schife, of the Palm Beach County Karbeen Mafia. The album's guest list includes Rick Ross, Ludacris, Jazmine Sullivan, The-Dream, Birdman, and Lloyd. The album debuted at number 23 on the Billboard 200, selling 20,000 copies its first week.

Hood's third album, Blood, Sweat & Tears, was released on August 9, 2011. The first official single, "Hustle Hard", became his highest charting solo single, peaking at number 60 on the Billboard Hot 100. The second official single was "Go 'N' Get It". Both were produced by Lex Luger. The third single was "Body 2 Body", featuring Chris Brown and produced by J.U.S.T.I.C.E. League. It peaked at number 65 on the Hot 100. The album features T-Pain, Yo Gotti, Kevin Cossom, Rick Ross, and Lil Wayne. The album debuted at number 8 on the Billboard 200, selling 26,000 copies, becoming Hood's most successful album this far. He promoted the album with his first concert tour, the Hustle Hard Tour.

Hood also appeared on three tracks from DJ Khaled's fifth studio album, We the Best Forever: "I'm Thuggin'", "Future", and "Welcome to My Hood (Remix)".

Hood started 2012 by collaborating with Cash Money Records artist Bow Wow on a song called "We Going Hard". He was set to appear on Maybach Music's Self Made Vol. 2 album.

Birdman and DJ Khaled signed Hood and We the Best Music Group to Cash Money Records. Hood was expected to record his fourth studio album under We the Best and Cash Money Records.

He has made guest appearances on tracks by artists such as Talib Kweli, Jadakiss, and Brisco. He was featured on "The Drill" by The Game, also featuring Meek Mill, which appears on his California Republic.

=== 2013–present: Trials & Tribulations ===
For his debut single on the We the Best & Cash Money label, Hood reunited with Trey Songz after four years, to make the early-2000s-styled love single "I Need Your Love".

Hood released his mixtape Starvation 2 on January 10, 2013. It features guest appearances from Meek Mill, French Montana and Plies.

On January 16, 2013, Hood announced his fourth studio album, Trials & Tribulations and released the first single from the album, "Bugatti", featuring Future and Rick Ross. The song was produced by Mike WiLL Made It. On February 6, 2013, the music video was released for "Bugatti" featuring Future and Rick Ross. The song made a hot-shot debut on the Hot R&B/Hip-Hop Songs chart at number 42. "Bugatti" peaked at number 33 on the Hot 100, becoming Hood's most successful single to date as a lead artist, and his first top 40 hit since "Out Here Grindin'".

On February 19, 2013, it was announced that Trials & Tribulations would be released on July 16, 2013.

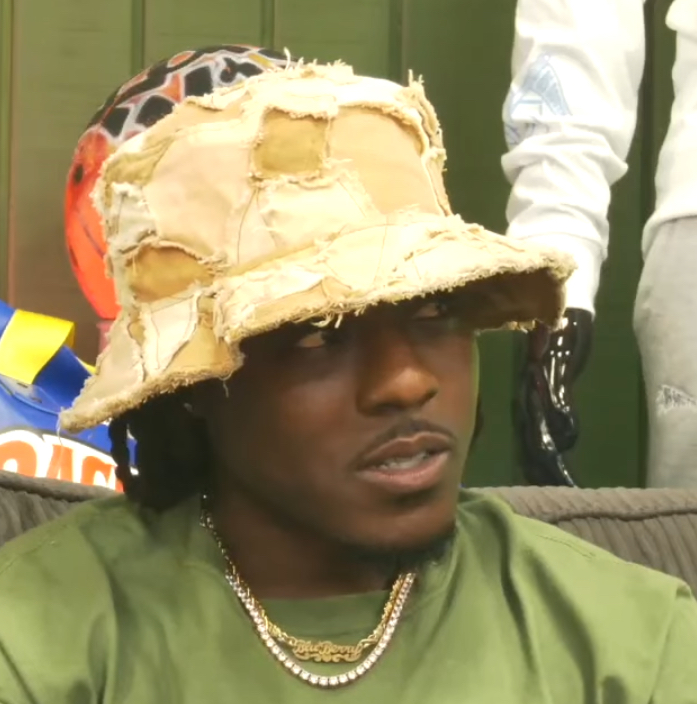
Ace Hood in 2024

On April 7, 2013, in an interview on Power 99 Philly with Mina SayWhat about his Trials and Tribulations album, Hood opened up about his family and deciding to go a different route with this album, working with Anthony Hamilton and John Legend. He said that he planned to get Lil Wayne and Kendrick Lamar to feature on the album as well.

On May 6, 2013, Hood released the remix of "Bugatti" featuring guests DJ Khaled, Future, Meek Mill, T.I., Wiz Khalifa, Birdman, French Montana, and 2 Chainz.

On June 5, 2013, Hood released the second single, "We Outchea", featuring his Cash Money label-mate Lil Wayne.

On June 26, 2013, the final track listing was revealed, featuring appearances from Meek Mill, Anthony Hamilton, Chris Brown and Betty Wright.

Hood released his Starvation 3 mixtape on January 17, 2014. The free project included features from We the Best label-mates Vado and Mavado, as well as Betty Wright and Kevin Cossom. Production for the mixtape came from Cool & Dre, The Renegades, StreetRunner, and The Beat Bully, among others.

Body Bag 3 was released on August 29. Two months later, Hood teamed up with Rich Homie Quan for a return single titled "We Don't".

In 2021, Hood joined the cast of Love & Hip Hop: Miami for the first half of the fourth season.

== Personal life ==
Hood is a Christian, and states that he "highly believe[s] in God".

Hood and his previous girlfriend, Shanice Tyria Sarratt, had twin daughters, Lyric and Sailor Blu McColister, on May 25, 2011. Lyric died shortly after birth due to health complications. Hood also has a son from a previous relationship.

He proposed to longtime girlfriend Shelah Marie in April 2019; they were married on February 7, 2020. A video of them went viral on December 26, 2020, in which his wife gave him a custom-made platinum plaque for Christmas. His wife explained that while on a label, artists are constantly gifted with plaques celebrating their streaming achievements; however, since becoming an independent artist, Hood had had no label to continue sending requests for Recording Industry Association of America certifications to receive an official plaque. In an effort to recognize her husband's continued independent success, Marie ordered plaques celebrating his recent streaming records.

== Discography ==
Studio albums

- Gutta (2008)
- Ruthless (2009)
- Blood, Sweat & Tears (2011)
- Trials & Tribulations (2013)
- Mr. Hood (2020)
- M.I.N.D. (Memories Inside Never Die) (2022)
- B.O.D.Y. (Build or Destroy You) (2023)
- S.O.U.L. (Some of Us Lose) (2025)

== Awards and nominations ==
BET Hip Hop Awards
Year	Category	Work	Result
2011	Best Club Banger	"Hustle Hard"	Nominated
2011	Best Collabo, Duo or Group	"Hustle Hard (Remix)" (with Rick Ross and Lil Wayne)	Nominated
2013	Best Club Banger	"Bugatti" (with Future and Rick Ross)	Nominated
2013	Best Collabo, Duo or Group	"Bugatti" (with Future and Rick Ross)	Nominated
