= Bugatti (song) =

2013 single by Ace Hood featuring Future and Rick Ross

Single by Ace Hood featuring Future and Rick Ross

from the album Trials & Tribulations
- Released: January 29, 2013
- Recorded: December 2012
- Genre: Trap
- Length: 4:31
- Label: We the Best; Cash Money; Republic
- Songwriters: Antoine McColister; William Leonard Roberts II; Nayvadius Wilburn; Michael Williams; Justin Garner
- Producers: Mike Will Made It; J-Bo

Ace Hood singles chronology
"Body 2 Body" (2011)	"Bugatti" (2013)	"We Outchea" (2013)

Future singles chronology
"Love Me" (2013)	"Bugatti" (2013)	"Karate Chop" (2013)

Rick Ross singles chronology
"Dope" (2013)	"Bugatti" (2013)	"Millions" (2013)

"Bugatti" is a song by American rapper Ace Hood featuring fellow American rappers Future and Rick Ross. Written alongside producers Mike Will Made It and J-Bo, it was released by We the Best Music Group, Cash Money Records, and Republic Records on January 29, 2013, as the lead single from the former's fourth studio album, Trials & Tribulations (2013). The song peaked at number 33 on the Billboard Hot 100, and was certified platinum by the Recording Industry Association of America (RIAA).

== Music video ==
The music video was directed by Gil Green and premiered on MTV Jams on February 6, 2013. DJ Khaled, Rocko, Birdman, and Kobe Bryant all make cameo appearances in the video.

== Uses in other media ==
The song made an appearance in Grand Theft Auto V on the Radio Los Santos station. In 2015, It was featured in NBA 2K16 on DJ Khaled Playlist.

== Track listing ==
Digital single

No.	Title	Writer(s)	Producer(s)	Length
1.	"Bugatti" (featuring Future and Rick Ross)	Antoine McColister, William Leonard Roberts II, Nayvadius Wilburn, Michael Williams, Justin Garner	Mike Will Made It, J-Bo	4:31

== Charts ==
=== Weekly charts ===
Chart (2013)	Peak position
Denmark (Tracklisten)	33
US Billboard Hot 100	33
US Hot R&B/Hip-Hop Songs (Billboard)	9
US Hot Rap Songs (Billboard)	8

=== Year-end charts ===
Chart (2013)	Position
US Billboard Hot 100	91
US Hot R&B/Hip-Hop Songs (Billboard)	26
US Rap Songs (Billboard)	20

== Certifications ==
Region	Certification	Certified units/sales
Brazil (Pro-Música Brasil)	Gold	30,000^{‡}
United States (RIAA)	Platinum	1,000,000^{‡}
^{‡} Sales+streaming figures based on certification alone.

== Release history ==
Country	Date	Format	Label
United States	January 29, 2013	Digital download	We the Best, Cash Money, Republic

== Remixes ==
"Bugatti (Remix)"

Single by Ace Hood featuring Wiz Khalifa, T.I., Meek Mill, French Montana, 2 Chainz, Future, DJ Khaled and Birdman

from the album Trials & Tribulations Deluxe Edition
- Released: May 6, 2013
- Recorded: 2013
- Genre: Trap
- Length: 5:26
- Songwriters: Antoine McColister; Nayvadius Wilburn; Michael Williams; Cameron Thomaz; Clifford Harris; Robert Willams; Karim Kharbouch; Tauheed Epps; Khaled Khaled; Bryan Williams
- Producers: Mike Will Made It; DJ Khaled

Ace Hood singles chronology
"Bugatti" (2013)	"Bugatti (Remix)" (2013)	"We Outchea" (2013)

Wiz Khalifa singles chronology
"Bugatti (Remix)" (2013)

T.I. singles chronology
"Bugatti (Remix)" (2013)

Meek Mill singles chronology
"Bugatti (Remix)" (2013)

French Montana singles chronology
"Bugatti (Remix)" (2013)

2 Chainz singles chronology
"Bugatti (Remix)" (2013)

Future singles chronology
"Bugatti (Remix)" (2013)

DJ Khaled singles chronology
"Bugatti (Remix)" (2013)

Birdman singles chronology
"Bugatti (Remix)" (2013)

On May 6, 2013, the song's official remix was released, featuring DJ Khaled and American rappers Wiz Khalifa, T.I., Meek Mill, French Montana, 2 Chainz, and Birdman, retaining Future and omitting Ross. The remix is included on the deluxe edition of Trials & Tribulations. Lil Wayne freestyled the song along with Boo on his mixtape Dedication 5.

== Awards and nominations ==
Year	Ceremony	Award	Result
2013	BET Hip Hop Awards	"Track of the Year"	Nominated
