= Cash Flow (song) =

Single by Ace Hood featuring T-Pain and Rick Ross

from the album Gutta
- Released: June 23, 2008
- Recorded: 2007
- Length: 4:22
- Label: We the Best; Def Jam
- Songwriters: Jermaine Jackson; Kevin Cossom; Andrew Harr; Khaled Khaled; Antoine McColister; William Roberts; Faheem Najm
- Producer: The Runners

Ace Hood singles chronology
"Cash Flow" (2008)	"Out Here Grindin" (2008)

T-Pain singles chronology
"I Can't Wait" (2008)	"Cash Flow" (2008)	"Moon of Dreams" (2008)

Rick Ross singles chronology
"Here I Am" (2008)	"Cash Flow" (2008)	"Foolish (Remix)" (2008)

"Cash Flow" is a song by American rapper Ace Hood, released by We the Best Music Group and Def Jam Recordings on June 23, 2008 as both his debut single and the lead single from his debut studio album, Gutta (2008). It features guest appearances fellow Florida-based rappers T-Pain and Rick Ross. We the Best label boss DJ Khaled and fellow signee Kevin Cossom both co-wrote the track alongside the aforementioned performers, while the production duo the Runners produced and co-wrote it.

"Cash Flow" entered both the Bubbling Under Hot 100 and Hot R&B/Hip-Hop Songs charts.

== Music video ==
The music video was released on May 1, 2008. It features cameos from Felicia Pearson, Fat Joe, DJ Nasty, Flo Rida, Fabolous, Brisco, Triple C's, Trick Daddy, Dunk Ryders, The Runners, Bali (The Runners' artist), Pitbull and Birdman.

== Charts ==
Chart (2008)	Peak position
US Bubbling Under Hot 100 (Billboard)	20
US Hot R&B/Hip-Hop Songs (Billboard)	55
