= Body 2 Body =

Single by Ace Hood featuring Chris Brown

from the album Blood, Sweat & Tears
- Released: July 26, 2011
- Recorded: 2011
- Genre: Hip hop; R&B
- Length: 3:55
- Label: We the Best Music Group; Def Jam
- Songwriters: A. McColister; K. Cossom; C. Brown; Kevin Crowe; Erik Ortiz
- Producer: J.U.S.T.I.C.E. League

Ace Hood singles chronology
"Go n Get It" (2011)	"Body 2 Body" (2011)	"Bugatti" (2013)

Chris Brown singles chronology
"Pot of Gold" (2011)	"Body 2 Body" (2011)	"Better with the Lights Off" (2011)

"Body 2 Body" is the third official single from rapper Ace Hood from his third album Blood, Sweat & Tears. The hip hop song features R&B singer Chris Brown and was released July 26, 2011.

== Critical reception ==
David Jeffries praised the track: "Cool pillow-talk tracks like “Body 2 Body” with Chris Brown and the J.U.S.T.I.C.E. League come off as crowd-pleasing interludes in an otherwise hungry album that takes the DJ Khaled style of Florida rap from penthouse to pavement." Hip Hop DX panned the song: ""Body 2 Body" is almost a reprieve with its smoother sound, but with lines like “Was that Chanel 5? Very sexy fragrance / Are those your real eyes? Can tell you’re partially Asian,” no one will have cause to press rewind."

== Music video ==
A music video to accompany the release of "Body 2 Body" was filmed on June 19, 2011 in West Hollywood. The video premiered on YouTube on July 27, 2011 at a total length of four minutes and two seconds. It features cameos from DJ Khaled and Rick Ross. As of April 2021 the video has over 20 million views.

== Remix ==
The official remix features Chris Brown on the chorus, Rick Ross, Wale & DJ Khaled. It was released on November 14, 2011.

== Track listing ==
Digital download
No.	Title	Length
1.	"Body 2 Body" (feat. Chris Brown)	3:55

== Chart performance ==
"Body 2 Body" spent thirteen weeks on the US Billboard Hot 100 in total, during which it reached a highest position of number 65. The song also peaked at number six on both the Hot R&B/Hip-Hop Songs and Rap Songs charts, making it Ace Hood's highest charting entry on both listings.

== Charts ==
=== Weekly charts ===
Chart (2011–12)	Peak position
US Billboard Hot 100	65
US Hot R&B/Hip-Hop Songs (Billboard)	6
US Hot Rap Songs (Billboard)	6
US Rhythmic Airplay (Billboard)	18

=== Year-end charts ===
Chart (2011)	Position
US Hot R&B/Hip-Hop Songs (Billboard)	63
Chart (2012)	Position
US Hot R&B/Hip-Hop Songs (Billboard)	82

== Release history ==
Country	Release date	Format(s)
United States	July 26, 2011	Digital download
United States	August 9, 2011	Radio airplay
