= Trials & Tribulations (Ace Hood album) =

Studio album by Ace Hood
- Released: July 16, 2013
- Recorded: 2012–2013
- Genre: Hip-hop
- Length: 55:24
- Labels: We the Best; YMCMB; Cash Money; Republic
- Producers: DJ Khaled (exec.); Slim Tha Don (exec.); Birdman (exec.); Dwayne "The President" Carter (exec.); Arthur McArthur; Ben Billions; Joshua Ard; Beewirks; Boi-1da; Cardiak; J-Bo; Lee on the Beats; Metro Boomin; Mike Will Made It; The Maven Boys; The Renegades; The Runners; Schife; Sonny Digital; Southside; Streetrunner; TM88; Young Chop

Ace Hood chronology
Blood, Sweat & Tears (2011)	Trials & Tribulations (2013)

Singles from Trials & Tribulations
- 1. "Bugatti" Released: January 29, 2013; 2. "We Outchea" Released: May 27, 2013; 3. "We Them Niggas" Released: June 27, 2013; 4. "Rider" Released: September 2013

Trials & Tribulations is the fourth studio album by American rapper Ace Hood. It was released on July 16, 2013, by We the Best Music Group, Young Money Cash Money Billionaires (YMCMB), Cash Money Records and Republic Records. The production on the album was handled by multiple producers including Boi-1da, Young Chop, Southside, Metro Boomin, Mike Will Made It, TM88, Cardiak, Sonny Digital and many others. The album also features guest appearances from Meek Mill, Future, Chris Brown, Rick Ross, Wiz Khalifa, T.I., 2 Chainz, Birdman and Anthony Hamilton among others.

Trials & Tribulations was supported by four singles: "Bugatti", "We Outchea", "We Them Niggas" and "Rider". The album received generally positive reviews from music critics and was a moderate commercial success. It debuted at number four on the US Billboard 200 chart, selling 34,000 copies in its first week.

== Background ==
On January 10, 2013, Ace Hood released a mixtape titled Starvation 2 in promotion of the album. It featured 20 tracks and guest appearances from Plies, Meek Mill, French Montana, and Kevin Cossom among others. On January 16, 2013, Ace Hood announced that his fourth studio album would be titled Trials & Tribulations. On February 19, 2013, it was announced that the album would be released on July 16, 2013. On March 8, 2013, the trailer for the album was released. On April 7, 2013, during an interview on Power 99, Ace Hood explained the meaning of the title and why he displays so much passion in his music, saying:

I felt like for me to actually get people to support this Trials & Tribulations album, that's dropping July 16, like I needed them to understand what I've been through and really kind of visualize and see my trials and tribulations and understand where the passion come from, understand where the hunger come from.

On June 13, 2013, the album cover was released. On June 26, 2013, the final track listing was revealed revealing guest appearances on the album from Meek Mill, Lil Wayne, Anthony Hamilton, Chris Brown, Future, Rick Ross, Betty Wright, Wiz Khalifa, T.I., French Montana, 2 Chainz, DJ Khaled and Birdman.

== Singles ==
On January 29, 2013, the first single from the album "Bugatti" featuring Rick Ross and Future was released. The music video for "Bugatti" was directed by Gil Green and premiered on 106 & Park on February 6, 2013. DJ Khaled and Birdman make an appearance in the video. The song has peaked at number 33 on the Billboard Hot 100, making it Ace Hood's most successful single of his career. The song has sold over 1,000,000 copies and been certified Platinum by the RIAA. On May 6, 2013 the "Bugatti" (Remix) was released featuring Wiz Khalifa, T.I., Meek Mill, French Montana, 2 Chainz, Future, DJ Khaled and Birdman. The remix would be included as a deluxe edition track on the album.

On June 5, 2013, the second single from the album "We Outchea" featuring Lil Wayne was released to iTunes. The song was solicited to rhythmic contemporary radio stations in the United States on June 25, 2013. On June 29, 2013, the music video was released for "We Outchea" featuring Lil Wayne.

"We Them Niggas" was released on June 26, 2013 along with the pre-order of the album on iTunes and then released as the album's third official single the following day. In September 2013, "Rider" featuring Chris Brown was serviced to urban contemporary and rhythmic contemporary radio in the United States as the album's fourth single.

The first promotional single from the album "I Need Your Love" featuring Trey Songz was released on October 16, 2012. On October 12, 2012, the music video was released for "I Need Your Love". The video features cameos from DJ Khaled, Birdman, Busta Rhymes, Meek Mill and Fat Joe. On April 5, 2013, the music video was released for "Have Mercy". On July 16, 2013, the music video was released for "Trials & Tribulations". On August 22, 2013, the music video for "Before the Rollie" featuring Meek Mill premiered on 106 & Park.

== Critical reception ==
Professional ratings
Aggregate scores
Source	Rating
Metacritic	69/100
Review scores
Source	Rating
AllHipHop	8.5/10
AllMusic	4/5 stars
Artistdirect	5/5 stars
Exclaim!	7/10
HipHopDX	2.5/5 stars
The New York Times	(mixed)
PopMatters	8/10
Rolling Stone	3/5 stars
RapReviews	6.5/10
XXL	(L)

Trials & Tribulations was met with generally positive reviews from music critics. At Metacritic, which assigns a normalized rating out of 100 to reviews from critics, the album received an average score of 69 which indicates "generally favorable reviews", based on 7 reviews. David Jeffries of AllMusic gave the album four out of five stars, saying "He sounds extra inspired when producer Sonny Digital pastes together gamelan orchestra chimes from Bali and a boom-bap backbeat from the golden age for the thrilling, hooky history lesson called "Before the Rollie," and when it comes to that Florida flash, "Bugatti" is blinding with Rick Ross and Future kicking the swagger into overdrive. The sequence of "Rider," "Hope," and "Pray for Me" makes for a long stretch of slow and low, and while this isn't a giant leap forward or a stunning diversion from previous releases, Hood's on a roll and it's hard not to welcome the usual power and polish." Reed Jackson of XXL gave the album an L, saying "Regardless of its hiccups, though, Trials & Tribulations is a step forward for Ace. Although he’ll always be best known for tracks like “Hustle Hard” and “Bugatti”, it'll be his more personal work that’ll separate him from the pack. Perhaps this will be the album that will finally put him in the limelight." Remmie Fresh of AllHipHop gave the album an 8.5 out of 10, saying "If there are issues on Trials and Tribulations, its in the repetitive content, but its easy to overcome, particularly once fans curate the songs their way on iTunes. There are incessant bars about God, the struggle, the haters, the money and the pursuit of prosperity. Sonically, he’s got great beats with The Renegades, Cardiak, Sonny Digital, Ben Billions, Schife, Streetrunner, and Lee on the Beats. This is his fourth album so he’s no rookie anymore and it shows. Hopefully, the BET debacle doesn’t have the social media world too hard on the emerging talent known as Ace Hood as his wings begin to spread."

Edwin Ortiz of HipHopDX gave the album two and a half stars out of five, saying "Ace Hood fails to deliver on Trials & Tribulations, and with four albums under his belt that have produced similar results, no rapper has arguably done so much and so little at the same time. Ace Hood has an irrefutable response for that, and it comes on the album’s title track, “Trials & Tribulations,” with the following, “Go ahead and count me out, you can talk behind my back / Don’t give a fuck about what you say, so you think my music wack / That ain’t what my banker said, couple million wired in.” He makes more money than us. Argument settled." Chris Dart of Exclaim! gave the album a seven out of ten, saying "Trials and Tribulations is a solid album; Hood is able to make music that moves both asses and minds, which is a rare skill." Jon Dolan of Rolling Stone gave the album three out of five stars, saying "Crisp Florida bass beats from producers like DJ Khaled and Boi 1da and sharp guest spots from Lil Wayne and Future keep things rolling, but his big heart keeps it real." David Amidon of PopMatters gave the album an eight out of ten, saying "Ask me anything about Ace Hood prior to Trials & Tribulations, I’d tell you he’s a rare talent who’ll probably never be worth listening to for an hour. Now? I’m not sure there’s anything worth listening to more, from the mainstream lane, released so far in 2013. I’m not sure anything better is on the horizon. Ace Hood came out of nowhere to deliver the most well rounded, engaging gangsta rap album on a major label in some time; it’ll be a shame if most folks manage to shrug it off."

== Commercial performance ==
Trials & Tribulations debuted at number four on the US Billboard 200 chart, selling 34,000 copies in its first week. This became Ace Hood's second US top-ten debut on the chart. In its second week, the album dropped to number 26 on the chart, selling an additional 11,000 copies. In its third week, the album dropped to number 64 on the chart, selling 6,000 more copies. In its fourth week, the album dropped to number 83 on the chart, selling 4,000 copies bringing its four-week total to 60,000 copies.

== Track listing ==
No.	Title	Writer(s)	Producer(s)	Length
1.	"Testimony"	Antoine McColister; Mervin Riviere; Bryan Johnson	The Renegades	1:27
2.	"Trials & Tribulations"	McColister; Riviere; Johnson	The Renegades	3:08
3.	"Another Statistic"	McColister; Carl McCormick	Cardiak	3:37
4.	"Before the Rollie" (featuring Meek Mill)	McColister; Robert Williams; Sonny Uwaezuoke	Sonny Digital	4:17
5.	"We Outchea" (featuring Lil Wayne)	McColister; Dwayne Carter; Anthony Norris	Lee on the Beats	4:19
6.	"We Them Niggas"	McColister; Matthew Samuels; Stephen Kozmeniuk; Zale Epstein; Brett Kruger	Boi-1da; The Maven Boys	4:04
7.	"The Come Up" (featuring Anthony Hamilton)	McColister; Jeremy McArthur; Anthony Hamilton	Arthur McArthur	3:59
8.	"Rider" (featuring Chris Brown)	McColister; Bobby Yewah; Christopher Brown; Kevin Cossom	Beewirks	4:30
9.	"Hope"	McColister; Norris; Evan Turner; Khaled Khaled	Lee on the Beats	4:32
10.	"Pray For Me"	McColister; Uwaezuoke; Leland Wayne; Bryan Simmons; Joshua Luellen	Sonny Digital; Metro Boomin; TM88; Southside	3:37
11.	"Bugatti" (featuring Future and Rick Ross)	McColister; Nayvadius Wilburn; William Roberts; Michael Williams; Justin Garner	Mike Will Made It; J-Bo	4:29
12.	"How I'm Raised"	McColister; Benjamin Diehl; Ian Lewis	Ben Billions; Schife	3:34
13.	"My Bible"	McColister; Nicholas Warwar; Eddie Robinson	Streetrunner	3:46
14.	"Mama" (featuring Betty Wright)	McColister; Bessie Norris; McCormick; Khaled Khaled; Barry Manilow	Cardiak; DJ Khaled^{[a]}	5:59
Total length:				55:24

Deluxe edition bonus tracks
No.	Title	Writer(s)	Producer(s)	Length
15.	"Bugatti (Remix)" (featuring Wiz Khalifa, T.I., Meek Mill, French Montana, 2 Chainz, Future, DJ Khaled and Birdman)	McColister; R. Williams; Wilburn; M. Williams; Garner; Khaled; Clifford Harris; Cameron Thomaz; Bryan Williams; Karim Kharbouch; Tauheed Epps	Mike Will Made It; J-Bo	5:26
16.	"Fuck Da World"	McColister; Tyree Pittman	Young Chop	4:26
17.	"Have Mercy"	McColister; McCormick	Cardiak	4:54
Total length:				70:12

Best Buy deluxe edition bonus tracks
No.	Title	Writer(s)	Producer(s)	Length
18.	"Thugs Fall" (featuring Kevin Cossom)	McColister; Cossom; Jermaine Jackson; Andrew Harr	The Runners	4:42
19.	"Disloyal"	McColister; Wayne	Metro Boomin	4:08

Track notes

- ^{^[a]} signifies a co-producer

Sample credits

- "Mama" contains a sample of "Sweet Life", written and performed by Barry Manilow

== Charts ==
=== Weekly charts ===
Chart (2013)	Peak position
Canadian Albums Chart	19
UK R&B Albums (Official Charts)	29
US Billboard 200	4
US Top R&B/Hip-Hop Albums (Billboard)	2

=== Year-end charts ===
Chart (2013)	Position
US Top R&B/Hip-Hop Albums (Billboard)	68
