= Gutta (album) =

Studio album by Ace Hood
- Released: November 18, 2008
- Genre: Hip-hop
- Length: 66:34
- Label: We the Best; Def Jam
- Producer: The Runners; Drumma Boy; GoldRu$h; Arnaz "The Nazty One" Smith; J.U.S.T.I.C.E. League; The Inkredibles; Kane Beatz; DJ Nasty & LVM; Cubic Z; Fatboi; Streetrunner; DVS; Tha Bizness; Jean "JRock" Borges; Cool & Dre; DJ Infamous; JackPot

Ace Hood chronology
Gutta (2008)	Ruthless (2009)

Singles from Gutta
- 1. "Cash Flow" Released: June 10, 2008; 2. "Ride" Released: September 2, 2008

Professional ratings
Review scores
Source	Rating
AllMusic	3.5/5 stars
DJBooth.net	3/5 stars
HipHopDX	2/5 stars
USA Today	2.5/4 stars

Gutta (also known as DJ Khaled Presents: Ace Hood Gutta on the digital version) is the debut studio album by American rapper Ace Hood. It was released on November 18, 2008, by We the Best Music Group and Def Jam Recordings. The album, a hip-hop record, was produced by The Runners, Drumma Boy, J.U.S.T.I.C.E. League, The Inkredibles, Kane Beatz, DJ Nasty & LVM, Tha Bizness, Cool & Dre, and DJ Infamous, alongside others, and features guest appearances from producer Dre of Cool & Dre, alongside Akon, Trick Daddy, R. City, T-Pain, Rick Ross, Trey Songz, Plies, Brisco, Lloyd, and Juelz Santana.

Upon its release, the album received mixed reviews from music critics. Commercially, the album debuted at number 36 on the US Billboard 200, selling 24,700 copies in its first week. It also peaked within the top 10 of the Top R&B/Hip-Hop Albums and Top Rap Albums charts, peaking overall at number 2 on the latter chart. Two singles, "Cash Flow" (featuring T-Pain and Rick Ross) and "Ride" (featuring Trey Songz), were released to promote the album on the 10th of June and the 2nd of September, 2008, respectively.

== Singles ==
The album's lead single, "Cash Flow" was released on June 10, 2008, as both the album's lead single and Hood's debut single in general. The song features guest appearances from T-Pain and Rick Ross and was produced by the Runners. Upon its release, the single charted at number 55 on the Hot R&B/Hip-Hop Songs chart and peaked at number 20 on the Bubbling Under Hot 100 chart. A music video was also made for the song, directed by Gil Green.

The album's second single, "Ride" was released on September 2, 2008. The song features guest appearance from American R&B singer Trey Songz, and its production was handled by The Inkredibles. Upon its release, the single fared more successful than its predecessor, charting at number 90 on the Billboard Hot 100, making it Hood's first single on the chart as a lead artist. The single also charted at number 27 on the Hot R&B/Hip-Hop Songs chart and peaked at number 14 on the Hot Rap Songs chart. A remix of the song, featuring Songz alongside Rick Ross and Juelz Santana, was included as the closing track to the album. Both versions had music videos directed by Gil Green.

Despite not being released as singles, "Get Em Up", "Can't See Y'All" (featuring Brisco), and "Stressin'" (featuring Plies) also received music videos. The former was directed by Gil Green, while the latter two were directed by Jordan Tower and Walk-D respectively.

== Commercial performance ==
Upon its release, the album charted at number 36 on the Billboard 200, selling 24,700 copies within its first week. The album also charted at number 5 on the Top R&B/Hip-Hop Albums chart and peaked at number 2 on the Top Rap Albums chart. By the end of 2009, the album was positioned at number 77 on the Top R&B/Hip-Hop Albums chart.

== Track listing ==
No.	Title	Writer(s)	Producer(s)	Length
1.	"I Don't Give a Fuck"	Antoine McColister; Alain Biambi; Joel Augustin	JackPot	2:54
2.	"Can't Stop" (featuring Akon)	McColister; Andrew Harr; Jermaine Jackson; Aliaune Thiam	The Runners	3:43
3.	"Get Em Up"	McColister; Christopher Gholson	Drumma Boy · Cubic Z	3:44
4.	"Gutta" (featuring Trick Daddy)	McColister; Buddy Long; Gerald Jackson; Peter Jackson	Gold Rush	4:00
5.	"Guns High" (featuring R. City)	McColister; Arnaz Smith; Theron Thomas; Timothy Thomas	Arnaz "The Nazty One" Smith	4:11
6.	"Cash Flow" (featuring T-Pain and Rick Ross)	McColister; Khaled Khaled; Harr; J. Jackson; William Roberts; Faheem Najm; Kevin "KC" Cossom	The Runners	4:22
7.	"Ride" (featuring Trey Songz)	Maurice Carpenter; Leigh Elliot; Johnny Mollings; Lenny Mollings; Najm; Tremaine Neverson	The Inkredibles	4:24
8.	"Fed Bound"	McColister; Nicholas Warwar; Bill Giant; Bernie Baum; Florence Kaye	Streetrunner	4:17
9.	"Stressin'" (featuring Plies)	McColister; Daniel Valbrun; Joseph Valbrun; Alexander Martin; Ronell Levatte; Plies	DVS	5:07
10.	"Money Ova Here"	Carpenter; Elliott; J. Mollings; L. Mollings	The Inkredibles	2:57
11.	"Can't See Y'all" (featuring Brisco)	McColister; Jean Borges	Jean "J Rock" Borges	3:44
12.	"Get Him"	McColister; Carpenter; Elliott; J. Mollings; L. Mollings	The Inkredibles	4:07
13.	"Call Me" (featuring Lloyd)	McColister; Carpenter; Elliott; J. Mollings; L. Mollings	The Inkredibles	3:14
14.	"Ghetto" (featuring Dre)	McColister; Marcello Valenzano; Andre Lyon	Cool & Dre	4:45
15.	"Top of the World"	McColister; Marco Rodriguez-Diaz; Ashaala Jenkins	Infamous	3:31
16.	"Ride (Remix)" (featuring Trey Songz, Rick Ross and Juelz Santana)	Carpenter; Elliott; J. Mollings; L. Mollings; Najm; Neverson; Roberts; LaRon James	The Inkredibles	3:57

=== Sample credits ===
- "Gutta" contains a sample of "Turn the Beat Around" as performed by Vicki Sue Robinson, written by Gerald and Peter Jackson.
- "Fed Bound" contains a sample from "It's No Good For Me" as performed by Johnny Nash; written by Bill Giant, Bernie Baum, and Florence Kaye.

== Charts ==
=== Weekly charts ===
Chart (2008)	Peak position
US Billboard 200	36
US Top R&B/Hip-Hop Albums (Billboard)	5
US Top Rap Albums (Billboard)	2

=== Year-end charts ===
Chart (2009)	Position
US Top R&B/Hip-Hop Albums (Billboard)	77
