= Go n Get It =

Single by Ace Hood

from the album Blood, Sweat & Tears
- Released: June 14, 2011
- Recorded: 2011
- Genre: Hardcore hip hop; Southern hip hop
- Length: 3:56
- Label: We the Best Music Group, The Island Def Jam Music Group
- Songwriters: Antoine McColister, Lexus Arnel Lewis
- Producer: Lex Luger

Ace Hood singles chronology
"Hustle Hard" (2011)	"Go n Get It" (2011)	"Body 2 Body" (2011)

"Go n Get It" is a song by American rapper Ace Hood, released as the second single from his third studio album Blood, Sweat & Tears on June 14, 2011. The song was produced by Lex Luger, and co-written by Hood and Luger. Originally, "Go 'N Get It" was featured on Ace Hood's mixtape, Body Bag Vol. 1.

== Music video ==
A music video to accompany the release of "Go n Get It" was first released onto YouTube on 5 July 2011 at a total length of four minutes and four seconds. This was his first music video made in his home town, Broward County.

== Remixes ==
The official remix to "Go n Get It" features Beanie Sigel, Busta Rhymes, Pusha T and Styles P.

Tyga also did this song as "Bad Bitches", which features fellow Young Money rapper Gudda Gudda, off of Tyga's "Black Thoughts 2" mixtape. Then, he remixed the song with 2 Chainz on his mixtape #BitchImTheShit.

== Track listing ==
Album version
No.	Title	Length
1.	"Go n Get It"	3:56

== Charts ==
Chart (2011)	Peak position
US Hot R&B/Hip-Hop Songs (Billboard)	60

== Release history ==
Country	Date	Format	Label
United States	June 13, 2011	Urban contemporary radio	We the Best Music Group, Def Jam Recordings
United States	June 14, 2011	Digital download	We the Best Music Group, Def Jam Recordings
