= California Republic (mixtape) =

Mixtape by Game
- Released: April 5, 2012
- Recorded: 2010–2012
- Genre: Hip hop; hardcore hip hop; gangsta rap
- Length: 97:30
- Label: Money Gang, The Black Wall Street Records
- Producer: Cool & Dre, Infamous, StreetRunner, Trey Songz, The Neptunes, Lex Luger, Arthur McArthur, Boi-1da, The Beat Bully, Young Yonny, Mars, Tre Beatz, Trigga, Sam Kalandjian, King David, SAP, Orlando and Tsass, the Dope Boyz

Game chronology
The R.E.D. Album (2011)	California Republic (2012)	Jesus Piece (2012)

California Republic is the thirteenth mixtape by rapper the Game hosted by DJ Skee. The mixtape was released April 5, 2012 and follows the mixtape Purp and Patron in 2011.

== Background ==
The mixtape features guest appearances by Fat Joe, Rick Ross, Busta Rhymes, DJ Khaled, Ace Hood, Meek Mill, 2 Chainz, French Montana, Slim Thug, Fabolous, Trey Songz, Snoop Dogg, Lupe Fiasco, Pharrell, Shyne, Nipsey Hussle, Teyana Taylor, Young Chris, Ben J, Mysonne, Lyfe Jennings, Drake, Lil Wayne, Mele, Lifestyle, Nobody, Eric Bellinger, Sam Hook, Kid Red, Kobe, Cyssero and Denise Janae. The mixtape contains a number of songs that were originally scheduled to appear on The R.E.D. Album. These include "Bottles and Rockin' J's", "Skate On", "When My Niggas Come Home" and "Roll My Shit".

Production came from Cool and Dre, Infamous, StreetRunner, Trey Songz, the Neptunes, Lex Luger, Boi-1da, the Beat Bully, Young Yonny, Mars, Tre Beatz, Sam Kalandjian, King David, Orlando and Tsass.

== Track listing ==
No.	Title	Producer(s)/Original instrumental	Length
1.	"God Speed" (featuring Mele)	The Beat Bully	6:09
2.	"Red Bottom Boss" (featuring Rick Ross)	"Lord Knows" by Drake	3:26
3.	"The Drill" (featuring Ace Hood and Meek Mill)	Streetrunner	3:55
4.	"Hit the J" (featuring Lifestyle)	Cool & Dre	3:30
5.	"Mean Muggin'" (featuring 2 Chainz and French Montana)	SAP	3:09
6.	"Yonkers Freestyle" (featuring Nobody)	"Yonkers" by Tyler, the Creator	2:24
7.	"Death Penalty" (featuring Fabolous, Slim Thug and Eric Bellinger)	Lex Luger	4:21
8.	"Bottles & Rockin' J's (Remix)" (featuring Busta Rhymes, Rick Ross, Fabolous, Lil Wayne and Teyana Taylor)	Lex Luger	5:35
9.	"Tonight" (featuring Mele)	Tre Beatz and the Beat Bully	4:28
10.	"Greystone" (featuring Fat Joe, Young Chris and Sam Hook)	The Dope Boyz	3:20
11.	"Pussy, Money, Weed" (featuring Kid Red, Lifestyle and Ben J.)	Tre Beatz	2:55
12.	"Gone Ahead" (featuring Mele)	Sam Kalandjian	3:20
13.	"Now That I'm Paid" (featuring Rick Ross and Mele)	"I Am the Streets" by Trae tha Truth featuring Rick Ross, Lloyd and the Game	3:41
14.	"Skate On" (featuring Lupe Fiasco)	Infamous	4:10
15.	"When My Niggas Come Home" (featuring Snoop Dogg and Pharrell)	The Neptunes	4:32
16.	"It Must Be Tough" (featuring Pharrell and Mysonne)	The Neptunes	4:22
17.	"She Want to Have My Baby" (featuring Trey Songz)	Trey Songz	4:21
18.	"Come Up" (featuring Lifestyle and Drake)	Boi-1da and Arthur McArthur	3:37
19.	"Cats and Dogs" (featuring Kobe)	King David	5:51
20.	"The Logo" (featuring Lifestyle, Atlas and Mele)	Tre Beatz	4:12
21.	"The Best Revenge" (featuring Lyfe Jennings and Denise Janae)	Young Yonny, Orlando and Tsass	3:03
22.	"They Don't Want None" (featuring Shyne and Pharrell)	The Neptunes	3:41
23.	"Bills Is Paid" (featuring Nipsey Hussle and Sam Hook)	Mars	5:01
24.	"Roll My Shit" (featuring Snoop Dogg)	The Neptunes	4:39
