= Hustle Hard =

2011 single by Ace Hood

Single by Ace Hood

from the album Blood, Sweat & Tears
- Released: March 1, 2011
- Recorded: 2010
- Genre: Hardcore hip hop, trap
- Length: 3:15
- Label: We the Best; Def Jam
- Songwriters: A. McColister, L. Lewis
- Producer: Lex Luger

Ace Hood singles chronology
"Champion" (200)	"Hustle Hard" (2011)	"Go n Get It" (2011)

Hustle Hard is the first official single from Ace Hood's third studio album Blood, Sweat & Tears. It originally appeared on Ace Hood's preceding mixtape The Statement. It is produced by Lex Luger. The official remix features Rick Ross and Lil Wayne. The original music video and half of the remix music video was made on the same day. A version of the track featuring Swizz Beatz was also a part of Swizz' "Monster Mondays" program. The remix music video was released to 106 & Park: BET's Top 10 Live, on his birthday, May 11, 2011.

== Chart position ==
"Hustle Hard" debuted at #87 on the Billboard Hot 100 in the April 23, 2011 issue, making it one of the highest-charting singles of Ace's career. The single has sold over 143.000 Copies (surpassing Ride's prior peak at #90 over two years earlier). So far the song has peaked at #60 on the Billboard Hot 100.

== Remixes and freestyles ==
- Maino released a freestyle to "Hustle Hard" on January 7, 2011.
- Obie Trice released a freestyle to the track on January 13, 2011.
- Yo Gotti released a freestyle to the track on January 29, 2011.
- Slim Thug, LE$, & MUG released a remix to "Hustle Hard" on January 31, 2011.
- Young Jeezy released a freestyle to the track on February 23, 2011 titled the "G-Mix".
- Joell Ortiz released a remix to the track on February 23, 2011.
- Trey Songz released a rap remix to the track titled "Fuck Em'" on February 25, 2011.
- Jim Jones and Sen City released a mash-up remix of Hustle Hard and J. Cole's "Hit in the Morning" titled "Hustle in the Mornin" on March 25, 2011.
- Chipmunk released a UK freestyle to the track on May 24, 2011.
- Tinchy Stryder with Slix released a UK freestyle to "Hustle Hard" on June 29, 2011.
- Kutt Calhoun released a freestyle over the track on July 25, 2011.
- Lil' Kim released a remix of the same title, on her 2011 mixtape, Black Friday.
- Meek Mill released a freestyle on his mixtape, Maybach Milly.
- Lil Wyte released a freestyle on his mixtape, Wyte Christmas.

== Remix ==
"Hustle Hard (Remix)"

Single by Ace Hood featuring Rick Ross and Lil Wayne

from the album Blood, Sweat & Tears
- Released: May 10, 2011
- Recorded: 2011
- Genre: Hardcore hip hop, trap
- Length: 4:46
- Label: We the Best, Def Jam
- Songwriters: Anotine McColister, Lexus Lewis, William Roberts II, Dwayne Carter, Jr.
- Producer: Lex Luger

Ace Hood singles chronology
"Champion" (2009)	"Hustle Hard (Remix)" (2011)	"Go 'N' Get It" (2011)

Rick Ross singles chronology
"Can a Drummer Get Some?" (2011)	"Hustle Hard (Remix)" (2011)	"John" (2011)

Lil Wayne singles chronology
"Motivation" (2011)	"Hustle Hard (Remix)" (2011)	"Red Nation" (2011)

The official remix to the song was released on May 10, 2011 and it features Rick Ross and Lil Wayne. The first half of the remix music video was with Ross in California. Then, Ace Hood went back to Miami and met with Wayne to do the second half of the "Hustle Hard (Remix)" music video. Wayne's line in the remix "LIV on Sunday, King of Diamonds Monday", referencing two popular nightclubs in Miami, incentivized the former of the two to induct him into their "LIV on Sunday Hall of Fame" as its first member.

On his birthday, May 11, 2011, the official music video for the remix to Hustle Hard was released on 106 & Park: BET's Top 10 Live. It had cameos by DJ Khaled, Marley G, Birdman, Mack Maine, Busta Rhymes, Fat Joe, Dr. Dre, Meek Mill, Pill, Gunplay, and DJ Stevie J.

This remix was performed at BET Awards 2011 with DJ Khaled, Rick Ross & Lil Wayne .

== Sports ==
Los Angeles Dodgers left fielder Matt Kemp, Milwaukee Brewers second baseman Rickie Weeks, his younger brother - Oakland Athletics second baseman Jemile Weeks, Philadelphia Phillies outfielder John Mayberry, Jr., New York Mets shortstop José Reyes, San Francisco Giants third baseman Pablo Sandoval, and New York Yankees outfielder Andruw Jones currently use it as their entrance music.

== Charts ==
=== Weekly charts ===
Chart (2011)	Peak position
US Billboard Hot 100	60
US Hot R&B/Hip-Hop Songs (Billboard)	9
US Hot Rap Songs (Billboard)	10
US Rhythmic Airplay (Billboard)	31

=== Year-end charts ===
Chart (2011)	Position
US Hot R&B/Hip-Hop Songs (Billboard)	30
