= Ride (Ace Hood song) =

Single by Ace Hood featuring Trey Songz

from the album Gutta
- Released: July 15, 2008
- Recorded: 2008
- Genre: Hip hop, R&B
- Length: 4:25
- Label: We the Best, Def Jam
- Songwriters: Antoine McColister; Tremaine Neverson; Faheem Najm; Leigh Elliott; Jeremy Varner; Maurice Carpenter; Johnny Mollings; Lenny Mollings
- Producers: The Inkredibles (Elliott, Carpenter)

Ace Hood singles chronology
"Out Here Grindin" (2008)	"Ride" (2008)	"Overtime" (2009)

Trey Songz singles chronology
"Ya Heard Me" (2008)	"Ride" (2008)	"Cuddy Buddy" (2008)

"Ride" (originally called "Ride or Die") is the second single from Ace Hood's debut album Gutta. It features Trey Songz, and is produced by The Inkredibles. T-Pain wrote the chorus. The video was shot on August 1, 2008.

The song was originally titled "Ride or Die", until Def Jam renamed it "Ride" because it was more radio-friendly.

== Music video ==
The music video for “Ride” by Ace Hood was filmed on August 1, 2008, under the direction of Gil Green. DJ Khaled, Johnny Dang, Rick Ross, and Torch & Gunplay from Triple C's make a cameo appearance. This is the first video in which Trey Songz shows his new look.

The music video features Ace Hood having a good time with his girlfriend until she gets arrested for covering for him.

The song's music video also debuted at #9 on BET's 106 & Park.

== Remix ==
The official remix has 2 versions.

Both versions features Rick Ross & Juelz Santana. But the first version, the original leaked version, features T-Pain on the chorus. And the second version, which is the video & album version, features Trey Songz on the chorus, replacing T-Pain, who was not in the video.

It has similar instrumentals to the original, but not quite the same. This is because DJ Khaled co-produced the remix and the original beat was replaced by DJ Khaled's beat.

The remix video was released with the video for "Get Em Up" on October 28, 2008. It features cameos from DJ Khaled, Akon, Twista, Jim Jones, Busta Rhymes, Jadakiss, DJ Drama, Brisco, Ray J, Shawty Lo and Soulja Boy Tell 'Em, Triple C's, among many others.

== Charts ==
Chart (2008)	Peak position
US Billboard Hot 100	90
US Hot R&B/Hip-Hop Songs (Billboard)	27
US Hot Rap Songs (Billboard)	14
