= List of awards and nominations received by Alicia Keys =

Alicia Keys awards and nominations
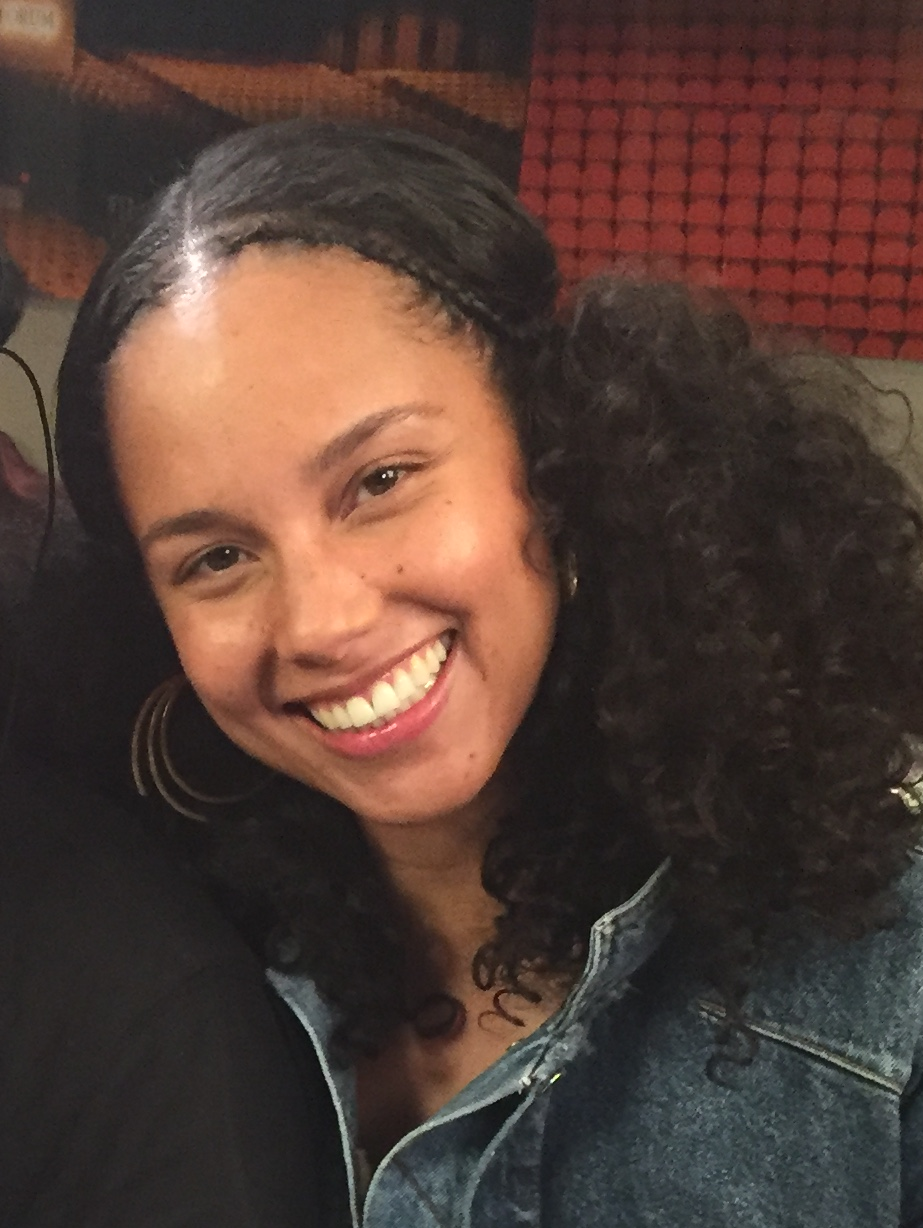
- Keys in 2017
Awards and nominations
Award	Wins	Nominations
American Music Awards	5	14
Billboard Music Awards	9	27
Brit Awards	0	10
Critics' Choice Awards	0	1
Grammy Awards	17	33
Emmy Awards	0	2
MTV Europe Music Awards	3	10
MTV Video Music Awards	4	11
Tony Awards	0	1

Totals (Note: Certain award groups do not simply award one winner. They acknowledge several different recipients, have runners-up, and have third place. Since this is a specific recognition and is different from losing an award, runner-up mentions are considered wins in this award tally. For simplification and to avoid errors, each award in this list has been presumed to have had a prior nomination.)
- Wins: 274
- Nominations: 791

This is a list of awards and nominations received by Alicia Keys, an American singer-songwriter, record producer, television personality and entrepreneur. With seventeen wins, she is the fourth most awarded female artist at the Grammy Awards. She also won nine Billboard Music Awards, four MTV VMA, three MTV EMA, eighteen NAACP Image Awards and eleven Soul Train Music Awards.

Active in the music industry field since the 2000s, Keys published her debut album, Songs in A Minor in 2001. The project was nominated for six Grammy Awards, winning five, including Best R&B Album, Song of the Year for "Fallin'", and Best New Artist. Keys also received a MTV Video Music Awards, two American Music Awards, six NAACP Image Awards and two Billboard Music Awards. Keys' second album, The Diary of Alicia Keys (2003) promoted by the lead singles "If I Ain't Got You" and "You Don't Know My Name", winning three Grammy Awards. She also won six Billboard Music Awards, including Hot 100 Songwriter of the Year. The same year she collaborated with Usher on "My Boo" which won the Grammy Award for Best R&B Performance by a Duo or Group with Vocals. In 2005 she published her live album Unplugged promoted by the single "Unbreakable", which won two NAACP Image Awards.

The third studio album As I Am (2008) won two American Music Awards while the songs "No One" and "Superwoman" won three awards at the 50th Annual Grammy Awards. The following studio album The Element of Freedom (2009) was promoted by "Un-Thinkable (I'm Ready)" which won a Soul Train Music Award. The same year she was featured on Jay-Z's song "Empire State of Mind", which won the Grammy Awards for Best Rap Song and Best Rap/Sung Collaboration, a MTV VMA and a BET Award. In 2012 she published fifth studio album Girl on Fire winner of the Grammy Award for Best R&B Album while the song of the same name won an NAACP Image Award. The sixth album Here (2016) was promoted by short-form film Alicia Keys: The Gospel recognized with a Clio Awards. The following two studio albums were Alicia (2020), which won the Grammy Award for Best Immersive Audio Album, and Keys (2021).

Keys also received nominations at the Primetime Emmy Awards and News and Documentary Emmy Awards as executive producer and host at the 61st Annual Grammy Awards. In 2024 her Broadway jukebox musical Hell's Kitchen won a Drama League Awards for Outstanding Production of a Musical and received a nomination at the Tony Award for Best Musical. For her original song "Another Way to Die" for James Bond film Quantum of Solace she was nominated at the Critics' Choice Movie Award for Best Song.

For her impact in the music industry she was honored with the Hal David Starlight Award by the Songwriters Hall of Fame (2005), with the Impact Awards by the Billboard Women in Music (2019), the Innovator Award by the IHeartRadio Music Awards (2019) and The Recording Academy's Producers & Engineers Wing Award (2018). ASCAP recognized Keys with the Songwriter of the Year in 2005 and the Golden Note Award in 2009, while the BET awarded Keys with the Artis of Decade Award in 2010.

== American Music Awards ==
The American Music Awards are held annually to award the outstanding achievements of American artists in the record industry. Keys has won five awards from sixteen nominations.

Year	Nominee / work	Award	Result
2002	Songs in A Minor	Favorite Album, Soul/R&B	Nominated
2002	Alicia Keys	Favorite Female Artist, Pop/Rock	Nominated
2002	Alicia Keys	Favorite New Artist, Pop/Rock	Won
2002	Alicia Keys	Favorite Female Artist, Soul/R&B	Nominated
2002	Alicia Keys	Favorite New Artist, Soul/R&B	Won
2002	Alicia Keys	Favorite Internet Artist	Nominated
2004	Alicia Keys	Favorite Female Artist, Soul/R&B	Won
2004	The Diary of Alicia Keys	Favorite Album, Soul/R&B	Nominated
2008	As I Am	Best Album, Pop/Rock	Won
2008	As I Am	Best Album, Soul/R&B	Won
2008	Alicia Keys	Artist of the Year	Nominated
2008	Alicia Keys	Favorite Female Artist, Pop/Rock	Nominated
2008	Alicia Keys	Favorite Female Artist, Soul/R&B	Nominated
2010	Alicia Keys	Favorite Female Artist, Soul/R&B	Nominated
2010	The Element of Freedom	Best Album, Soul/R&B	Nominated
2013	Alicia Keys	Favorite Female Artist, Soul/R&B	Nominated

== Amnesty International Awards ==
Year	Nominee / work	Award	Result
2017	Alicia Keys	Ambassador of Conscience Award	Won

== Arthur Miller Foundation Awards ==
Year	Nominee / work	Award	Result
2024	Alicia Keys	Arts & Culture Award	Won

== Artivist Awards ==
Year	Nominee / work	Award	Result
2013	Alicia Keys	Artivist Award	Won

== ASCAP Awards ==
The ASCAP Awards are held annually by the American Society of Composers, Authors and Publishers.

=== ASCAP Pop Awards ===
The ASCAP Pop Music Awards honors the songwriters and publishers of the most performed pop songs. Keys has won four awards.

Year	Nominee / work	Award	Result
2003	"Fallin'"	Most Performed Song	Won
2005	"If I Ain't Got You"	Most Performed Song	Won
2005	"You Don't Know My Name"	Most Performed Song	Won
2009	"No One"	Most Performed Song	Won

=== ASCAP Rhythm & Soul Awards ===
The ASCAP Rhythm & Soul Music Awards honors songwriters and publishers of top R&B, hip hop, and reggae music. Keys has won eight awards, including one special award.

Year	Nominee / work	Award	Result
2002	"Fallin'"	Award Winning R&B/Hip-Hop Song	Won
2005	Alicia Keys	Songwriter of the Year	Won
2005	"If I Ain't Got You"	Top R&B/Hip-Hop Song of the Year	Won
2009	Alicia Keys	Golden Note Award	Won
2009	"Like You'll Never See Me Again"	Top R&B/Hip-Hop Song of the Year	Won
2009	"No One"	Ascap R&B/Hip-Hop Award	Won
2009	"Teenage Love Affair"	Ascap R&B/Hip-Hop Award	Won
2014	"Girl on Fire"	Award Winning R&B/Hip-Hop Song	Won

== BCG Awards ==
Keys has received four nominations.

Year	Nominee / work	Award	Result
2012	Alicia Keys – Keep A Child Alive Foundation	Celebrity Giver of the Year	Nominated
2015	Alicia Keys – Black Ball	Best Charity Event of the Year	Nominated
2015	#WeAreHere	BCG Best Cause Campaign of the Year	Nominated
2015	Alicia Keys	BCG Celebrity Giver of the Year	Nominated

== BEFFTA Awards ==
The Black Entertainment, Film, Fashion, Television and Arts (BEFFTA) Awards celebrate and reward the achievements of the known and unknown black personalities within entertainment, film, fashion, television and arts. Keys has received three nominations.

Year	Nominee / work	Award	Result
2010	Alicia Keys	Best International Act	Nominated
2014	Alicia Keys	Best International Act	Nominated
2016	Alicia Keys	Best International Act	Nominated

== Billboard Awards ==
=== Billboard Music Awards ===
The Billboard Music Awards are held to honor artists for commercial performance in the United States based on record charts published by Billboard. Keys has won nine awards from twenty-seven nominations.

Year	Nominee / work	Award	Result
2001	"Fallin'"	Hot 100 Single of the Year	Nominated
2001	Songs in A Minor	R&B/Hip-Hop Album of the Year	Nominated
2001	Alicia Keys	Female Artist of the Year	Won
2001	Alicia Keys	New Artist of the Year	Nominated
2001	Alicia Keys	Female Albums Artist of the Year	Nominated
2001	Alicia Keys	Female Hot 100 Singles Artist of the Year	Nominated
2001	Alicia Keys	Female R&B/Hip-Hop Artist of the Year	Nominated
2001	Alicia Keys	New R&B/Hip-Hop Artist of the Year	Won
2004	Alicia Keys	Artist of the Year	Nominated
2004	Alicia Keys	Female Artist of the Year	Won
2004	Alicia Keys	Hot 100 Artist of the Year	Nominated
2004	Alicia Keys	Hot 100 Songwriter of the Year	Won
2004	The Diary of Alicia Keys	R&B/Hip-Hop Album of the Year	Nominated
2004	The Diary of Alicia Keys	Billboard 200 Album of the Year	Nominated
2004	"If I Ain't Got You"	R&B/Hip-Hop Single of the Year	Won
2004	"If I Ain't Got You"	R&B/Hip-Hop Airplay Single of the Year	Won
2004	"Diary"	R&B/Hip-Hop Airplay Single of the Year	Nominated
2004	Alicia Keys	R&B/Hip-Hop Albums Artist of the Year	Won
2004	Alicia Keys	R&B/Hip-Hop Artist of the Year	Nominated
2004	Alicia Keys	R&B/Hip-Hop Singles Artist of the Year	Won
2004	Alicia Keys	Female R&B/Hip-Hop Artist of the Year	Won
2005	Alicia Keys	Female R&B/Hip-Hop Artist of the Year	Nominated
2011	Alicia Keys	Top R&B Artist	Nominated
2011	"Un-thinkable (I'm Ready)"	Top R&B Song	Nominated
2013	Alicia Keys	Top R&B Artist	Nominated
2013	"Girl On Fire"	Top R&B Song	Nominated
2013	Girl on Fire	Top R&B Album	Nominated

=== Billboard Latin Music Awards ===
The Billboard Latin Music Awards reflect the performance of recordings on the Hot Latin Songs. Keys has been nominated three times and has won one award.

Year	Nominee / work	Award	Result
2010	Alicia Keys	Crossover Artist of the Year	Nominated
2010	Alicia Keys	Crossover Artist of the Year, Solo	Nominated
2010	"Looking for Paradise"	Hot Latin Song of the Year, Vocal Event	Won

=== Billboard R&B/Hip-Hop Awards ===
The Billboard R&B/Hip-Hop Awards reflect the performance of recordings on the Hot R&B/Hip-Hop Songs and Hot Rap Tracks. Keys has won six awards.

Year	Nominee / work	Award	Result
2002	Songs in A Minor	Top R&B/Hip-Hop Album	Won
2002	Alicia Keys	Top R&B/Hip-Hop Artist	Nominated
2002	Alicia Keys	Top R&B/Hip-Hop Artist, Female	Won
2002	Alicia Keys	Top R&B/Hip-Hop Artist, New	Won
2002	Alicia Keys	R&B/Hip-Hop Albums Artist	Won
2002	Alicia Keys	R&B/Hip-Hop Songwriter of the Year	Nominated
2004	The Diary of Alicia Keys	Top R&B/Hip-Hop Album	Nominated
2004	Alicia Keys	Top R&B/Hip-Hop Artist	Nominated
2004	Alicia Keys	Top R&B/Hip-Hop Artist, Female	Nominated
2004	Alicia Keys	Top R&B/Hip-Hop Albums Artist	Nominated
2004	"You Don't Know My Name"	Top R&B/Hip-Hop Single	Nominated
2005	"Diary"	Top R&B/Hip-Hop Single	Nominated
2005	"Diary"	Top R&B/Hip-Hop Single, Airplay	Nominated
2005	Alicia Keys	Top R&B/Hip-Hop Artist, Female	Won
2005	Alicia Keys	Top R&B/Hip-Hop Singles Artist	Nominated
2005	Alicia Keys	Top Songwriter	Won
2005	Alicia Keys	Top Producer	Nominated
2006	Alicia Keys	R&B/Hip-Hop Artist, Female	Nominated

=== Billboard Women in Music ===
Year	Nominee / work	Award	Result
2019	Alicia Keys	Impact Award	Won

== Berlin Music Video Awards ==
The Berlin Music Video Awards in an international festival that promotes the art of music videos.

Year	Nominee / work	Award	Result
2022	CITY OF GODS	Best Cinematography	Nominated

== BET ==
=== BET Awards ===
The BET Awards annually celebrate African Americans and other minorities in music, acting, sports, and other fields of entertainment. Keys has won seven awards from fifteen nominations.

Year	Nominee / work	Award	Result
2002	Alicia Keys	Best New Artist	Won
2002	Alicia Keys	Best Female R&B Artist	Nominated
2002	"Fallin'"	Viewers' Choice Award	Nominated
2004	"You Don't Know My Name"	Video of the Year	Nominated
2004	Alicia Keys	Best Female R&B Artist	Nominated
2005	Alicia Keys	Best Female R&B Artist	Won
2005	"My Boo"	Best Collaboration	Nominated
2008	"Like You'll Never See Me Again"	Video of the Year	Nominated
2008	Alicia Keys	Best Female R&B Artist	Won
2008	"No One"	Viewers' Choice Award	Nominated
2009	Alicia Keys	Humanitarian Award	Won
2010	Alicia Keys	Artist of the Decade	Won
2010	Alicia Keys	Best Female R&B Artist	Won
2010	"Empire State of Mind"	Viewers' Choice Award	Nominated
2010	"Empire State of Mind"	Video of the Year	Nominated
2010	"Empire State of Mind"	Best Collaboration	Won
2013	Alicia Keys	Best Female R&B/Pop Artist	Nominated
2019	"Raise a Man"	BET Her	Nominated
2020	"Underdog"	BET Her	Nominated

=== BETJ Virtual Awards ===
The BETJ Virtual Awards is an annual awards ceremony to recognize jazz musicians. Keys has won one award from three nominations.

Year	Nominee / work	Award	Result
2008	"Teenage Love Affair"	Song of the Year	Nominated
2008	As I Am	Album of the Year	Nominated
2008	Alicia Keys	Female Artist of the Year	Won

=== BET Hip Hop Awards ===
The BET Hip Hop Awards is an award show celebrating hip-hop performers, producers and music video directors. Keys has won two awards.

Year	Nominee / work	Award	Result
2006	"Ghetto Story Chapter 2"	Best Collaboration	Nominated
2010	"Empire State of Mind"	Best Hip Hop Video	Won
2010	"Empire State of Mind"	Perfect Combo Award	Won
2022	"City of Gods"	Impact Track	Nominated

=== BET Honors ===
BET Honors is an award show, which celebrates the lives and achievements of African American luminaries. Keys has won one award.

Year	Nominee / work	Award	Result
2008	Alicia Keys	Entertainment Award	Won

=== BET Pre-Awards ===
The BET Pre-Awards celebrate African Americans and other minorities in music, acting, sports, and other fields of entertainment. These annually presented awards are presented before the BET Awards and broadcast live on BET. Keys has won two awards.

Year	Nominee / work	Award	Result
2008	"Teenage Love Affair"	Best Acting in a Video – Drama Kings & Queens	Won
2008	"Like You'll Never See Me Again"	Best Action in a Video – Hip-Hop Action	Won

=== Black Girls Rock! ===
Black Girls Rock! is an award show, which honors and empowers women of color around the world in many different fields. Keys has received one award.

Year	Nominee / work	Award	Result
2012	Alicia Keys	Rock Star	Won

== Black American Music Association Awards ==
Year	Nominee / work	Award	Result
2023	Alicia Keys	Ella Fitzgerald Gold Standard Award	Won

== Black Reel Awards ==
The Black Reel Awards annually recognize and celebrate the achievements of black people in feature, independent and television films. Keys has received four nominations.

Year	Nominee / work	Award	Result
2007	"People Get Ready"	Best Song, Original or Adapted	Nominated
2014	"Queen of the Field (Patsey's Song)"	Outstanding Original Song	Nominated
2015	"It's on Again"	Outstanding Original Song	Nominated
2017	"Back to Life"	Outstanding Original Song	Nominated

== Black Theatre United Awards ==
Year	Nominee / work	Award	Result
2024	Alicia Keys	Aspire Award	Won

== BMI Awards ==
=== BMI London Pop Awards ===
Year	Nominee / work	Award	Result
2003	"Gangsta Lovin'"	Urban Award	Won

=== BMI Urban Awards ===
Year	Nominee / work	Award	Result
2003	"Gangsta Lovin'"	Award Winning Song	Won
2005	"You Don't Know My Name"	Award Winning Song	Won
2007	"Unbreakable"	Award Winning Song	Won
2010	"Empire State of Mind"	Most Performed Urban Song of the Year	Won
2011	"Try Sleeping with a Broken Heart"	Award Winning Song	Won
2011	"Un-Thinkable (I'm Ready)"	Award Winning Song	Won
2013	"Girl on Fire"	Most Performed Song	Won

== BT Digital Music Awards ==
The BT Digital Music Awards are held annually in the United Kingdom. Keys has received one nomination.

Year	Nominee / work	Award	Result
2010	Alicia Keys	Best International Artist or Group	Nominated

== BRAVO OTTO Awards (Hungary) ==
Keys has received one nomination.

Year	Nominee / work	Award	Result
2010	"Empire State of Mind"	Az év klipje	Nominated

== Brit Awards ==
The Brit Awards are the British Phonographic Industry's annual pop music awards. Keys has been nominated ten times.

Year	Nominee / work	Award	Result
2002	Alicia Keys	International Female Solo Artist	Nominated
2002	Songs in A Minor	International Album	Nominated
2003	Alicia Keys	International Female Solo Artist	Nominated
2003	Songs in A Minor	International Album	Nominated
2004	Alicia Keys	International Female Solo Artist	Nominated
2005	Alicia Keys	International Female Solo Artist	Nominated
2008	Alicia Keys	International Female Solo Artist	Nominated
2011	Alicia Keys	International Female Solo Artist	Nominated
2013	Alicia Keys	International Female Solo Artist	Nominated
2018	Alicia Keys	International Female Solo Artist	Nominated

== British LGBT Awards ==
Year	Nominee / work	Award	Result
2022	Alicia Keys	Celebrity Ally Award	Won

== Capital FM Awards ==
The Capital FM Awards is an awards show in the United Kingdom held by the radio station Capital that recognizes music releases from local and international artists. Keys has received one nomination.

Year	Nominee / work	Award	Result
2011	Alicia Keys	Best International Female	Nominated

== Cayman Island Premier's Awards ==
Year	Nominee / work	Award	Result
2009	Alicia Keys	Cayman Island Premier's Award for the Arts	Won

== Celebs Gone Good Awards ==
Keys has received two nominations.

Year	Nominee / work	Award	Result
2015	Alicia Keys	Top Celeb	Nominated
2016	Alicia Keys	Top Celeb	Nominated

== Clio Awards ==
The Clio Awards is an annual advertising award that recognizes innovation and creative excellence in advertising, design, and communication.

Year	Nominee / work	Award	Result
2017	Alicia Keys: The Gospel	Music - Film Long Form: Music Marketing	silver
2020	2% Choir (as songwriter and musical artist)	Music - Use of Music in Audio: Adapted	Grand Clio
2020	2% Choir (as songwriter and musical artist)	Music - Film/Video: Music Marketing	silver
2022	KEYS	Music - Branded Entertainment & Content: Music Marketing	Shortlisted

== CMT Music Awards ==
The CMT Music Awards is an annual ceremony dedicated exclusively to honor country music videos. Keys has received one nomination.

Year	Nominee / work	Award	Result
2017	"80s Mercedes" (with Maren Morris)	CMT Performance of the Year	Nominated

== Critics' Choice Movie Awards ==
The Critics' Choice Movie Awards are bestowed annually by the Broadcast Film Critics Association to honor the finest in cinematic achievement. Keys has received one nomination.

Year	Nominee / work	Award	Result
2008	"Another Way to Die"	Best Song	Nominated

== Directors Guild of America Awards ==
The Directors Guild of America Awards are issued annually by the Directors Guild of America. Keys has been nominated once.

Year	Nominee / work	Award	Result
2011	Alicia Keys	Outstanding Directorial Achievement in Movies for Television and Mini-Series	Nominated

== Drama League Award ==
The Drama League Awards honor distinguished productions and performances both on Broadway and Off-Broadway

Year	Nominee / work	Award	Result
2024	Hell's Kitchen	Outstanding Production of a Musical	Won

== DVF Awards ==
The DVF Awards are held to recognize and support women who are using their resources, commitment and visibility to transform the lives of other women. Keys has received one award.

Year	Nominee / work	Award	Result
2014	Alicia Keys	Inspiration Award	Won

== ECHO Awards ==
The ECHO Awards are an annual German music award ceremony that recognizes outstanding achievement in the music industry. Keys has won one award from two nominations.

Year	Nominee / work	Award	Result
2002	Alicia Keys	Best International Newcomer	Won
2002	Alicia Keys	Best International Female Artist	Nominated

== Edison Awards ==
The Edison Music Award is an annual Dutch music prize, awarded for outstanding achievements in the music industry. Keys has won one award from six nominations.

Year	Nominee / work	Award	Result
2002	"Fallin'"	Single Van Het Jaar	Nominated
2002	Alicia Keys for Songs in A Minor	R&B HipHop	Won
2002	Alicia Keys for Songs in A Minor	Niuwe Artiest/Groep Internationaal	Nominated
2002	Alicia Keys for Songs in A Minor	Zangeres Internationaal	Nominated
2004	Alicia Keys for The Diary of Alicia Keys	Zangeres Internationaal	Nominated
2006	Unplugged	DVD Internationaal	Nominated

== Essence Awards ==
The Essence Awards celebrate the achievements of prominent African Americans. Keys has received one award.

Year	Nominee / work	Award	Result
2002	Alicia Keys	Rising Star	Won

== EMMA Awards ==
The Ethnic Multicultural Media Academy promote diversity within the media industry by publicly recognizing the levels of excellence achieved by the multicultural community, and the qualities that each ethnic group brings to the professional and commercial success of the United Kingdom

Year	Nominee / work	Award	Result
2002	Alicia Keys	International Music Act	Won

== Fonogram Awards ==
Fonogram Awards is the national music awards of Hungary, held every year since 1992 and promoted by Mahasz.

Year	Nominee / work	Award	Result	Ref.
2003	Songs In A Minor	Rap or Hip-Hop Album of the Year	Won	
2021	Alicia	Best Foreign Pop Album	Nominated	

== GLAMOUR Magazine Women of the Year Awards ==
Year	Nominee / work	Award	Result
2004	Alicia Keys	Woman of the Year	Won

== Gordon Parks Foundation Awards ==
Year	Nominee / work	Award	Result
2024	Alicia Keys	Gordon Parks Patrons of the Arts Award	Won

== Grammy Awards ==
The Grammy Awards are awarded annually by the National Academy of Recording Arts and Sciences. Keys has won eighteen awards from thirty-one nominations, including Album of the Year, Record of the Year, Song of the Year and Best New Artist, she won the last two.

Year	Nominee / work	Award	Result
2002	Alicia Keys	Best New Artist	Won
2002	"Fallin'"	Record of the Year	Nominated
2002	"Fallin'"	Song of the Year	Won
2002	"Fallin'"	Best Female R&B Vocal Performance	Won
2002	"Fallin'"	Best R&B Song	Won
2002	Songs in A Minor	Best R&B Album	Won
2005	The Diary of Alicia Keys	Best R&B Album	Won
2005	The Diary of Alicia Keys	Album of the Year	Nominated
2005	"If I Ain't Got You"	Song of the Year	Nominated
2005	"If I Ain't Got You"	Best Female R&B Vocal Performance	Won
2005	"Diary" (with Tony! Toni! Toné!)	Best R&B Performance by a Duo or Group with Vocals	Nominated
2005	"My Boo" (with Usher)	Best R&B Performance by a Duo or Group with Vocals	Won
2005	"My Boo" (with Usher)	Best R&B Song	Nominated
2005	"You Don't Know My Name"	Best R&B Song	Won
2006	"Unbreakable"	Best R&B Song	Nominated
2006	"Unbreakable"	Best Female R&B Vocal Performance	Nominated
2006	"If This World Were Mine" (with Jermaine Paul)	Best R&B Performance by a Duo or Group with Vocals	Nominated
2006	"If I Was Your Woman"	Best Traditional R&B Vocal Performance	Nominated
2006	Unplugged	Best R&B Album	Nominated
2008	"No One"	Best R&B Song	Won
2008	"No One"	Best Female R&B Vocal Performance	Won
2009	"Superwoman"	Best Female R&B Vocal Performance	Won
2009	"Lesson Learned" (with John Mayer)	Best Pop Collaboration with Vocals	Nominated
2009	"Another Way to Die" (with Jack White)	Best Short Form Music Video	Nominated
2011	"Empire State of Mind" (with Jay-Z)	Record of the Year	Nominated
2011	"Empire State of Mind" (with Jay-Z)	Best Rap/Sung Collaboration	Won
2011	"Empire State of Mind" (with Jay-Z)	Best Rap Song	Won
2014	Girl on Fire	Best R&B Album	Won
2015	Girl (as featured artist)	Album of the Year	Nominated
2022	"A Beautiful Noise" (with Brandi Carlile)	Song of the Year	Nominated
2024	The Diary of Alicia Keys	Best Immersive Audio Album	Won
2025	Hell's Kitchen (Original Broadway Cast Recording)	Best Musical Theater Album	Won
2025	Alicia Keys	Global Impact Award	Honored

=== The Recording Academy's Producers & Engineers Wing ===
Year	Nominee / work	Award	Result
2018	Alicia Keys	Honored	Won

== Grammys on the Hill Awards ==
Year	Nominee / work	Award	Result
2015	Alicia Keys	Recording Artists' Coalition Award	Won

== Groovevolt Music and Fashion Awards ==
Year	Nominee / work	Award	Result
2005	"If I Ain't Got You"	Song of the Year	Nominated

== Guinness World Records ==
The Guinness World Records is a reference book published annually, listing world records and national records, both of human achievements and the extremes of the natural world.

Year	Nominated work	Record	Result	Ref.
2008	Alicia Keys	First singer to replace themselves at No.1 on US R&B/Hip Hop Songs chart	Won	
2020	Alicia Keys	Most MTV VMA nominations for Best R&B	Won	

== Harlem School of the Arts Awards ==
Year	Nominee / work	Award	Result
2015	Alicia Keys	Visionary Artist Award	Won

== Hollywood Film Awards ==
Year	Nominee / work	Award	Result
2008	Alicia Keys / the cast of The Secret Life of Bees	Hollywood Ensemble Acting of the Year Award	Won

== Hungarian Music Awards ==
The Hungarian Music Awards are handed out annually by the Hungarian Recording Industry Association. Keys has received two nominations.

Year	Nominee / work	Award	Result
2003	Songs in A Minor	Rap or Hip-Hop Album of the Year	Nominated
2011	The Element of Freedom	Modern Pop-Rock Album of the Year	Nominated

== IFPI Hong Kong Top Sales Music Awards ==
The IFPIHKG Awards are held annually in Hong Kong to honor every year's best-selling artists. Keys has received one award.

Year	Nominee / work	Award	Result
2004	The Diary of Alicia Keys	Ten Best Sales Releases, Foreign	Won

== iHeartRadio Music Awards ==
Year	Nominee / work	Award	Result
2019	Alicia Keys	Innovator Award	Won
2020	"Calma" (ft. Pedro Capó & Farruko)	Latin Pop/Urban Song of the Year	Nominated

== International Dance Music Awards ==
The International Dance Music Awards recognizes achievements in the electronic dance music industry. Keys has received three nominations.

Year	Nominee / work	Award	Result
2008	"No One"	Best R&B/Urban Dance Track	Nominated
2010	"Empire State of Mind"	Best Hip Hop Dance Track	Nominated
2013	"Girl on Fire"	Best R&B/Urban Dance Track	Nominated

== Italian Music Awards ==
The Italian Music Awards are held to recognize the achievements in the Italian music industry both by domestic and international artists. Keys has been nominated twice.

Year	Nominee / work	Award	Result
2002	Alicia Keys	Miglior Artista Femminile Internazionale	Nominated
2002	Alicia Keys	Miglior Rivelazione Internazionale	Nominated

== Kora Awards ==
The Kora Awards are music awards given annually for musical achievement in sub-Saharan Africa. Keys has won two awards.

Year	Nominee / work	Award	Result
2002	Alicia Keys	Best African American Diaspora Artist	Won
2008	Alicia Keys	Meilleur Artiste ou Groupe Diaspora Afrique / Amerique	Nominated
2010	Alicia Keys	Best African-American Artist of the Diaspora	Won

== La Chanson de l'Année ==
La Chanson de l'année (Song of the Year in English) is a French awards ceremony. Keys has received one nomination.

Year	Nominee / work	Award	Result
2012	"Girl on Fire"	Song of the Year	Nominated

== Lucille Lortel Awards ==
The Lucille Lortel Awards recognize excellence in New York Off-Broadway theatre. The Awards are named for Lucille Lortel, an actress and theater producer, and have been awarded since 1986. Keys has received one nomination.

Year	Nominee / work	Award	Result
2024	Hell's Kitchen	Outstanding Musical	Nominated

== Meteor Music Awards ==
The Meteor Music Awards are the national music awards of Ireland, established by mobile telecommunications company Meteor. Keys has received one nomination.

Year	Nominee / work	Award	Result
2006	Alicia Keys	Best International Female	Nominated

== MOBO Awards ==
The MOBO Awards are held annually in the United Kingdom to recognize artists of any race or nationality performing music of black origin. Keys has won one award from ten nominations.

Year	Nominee / work	Award	Result
2002	"Fallin'"	Best Single	Nominated
2002	Songs In A Minor	Best Album	Won
2002	Alicia Keys	Best R&B Act	Nominated
2002	Alicia Keys	Best Newcomer	Nominated
2004	Alicia Keys	Best R&B Act	Nominated
2004	The Diary of Alicia Keys	Best Album	Nominated
2006	Alicia Keys	Best International Female	Nominated
2008	Alicia Keys	Best International Act	Nominated
2008	As I Am	Best Album	Nominated
2010	Alicia Keys	Best International Act	Nominated

== MP3 Music Awards ==
The MP3 Music Awards are held to honour the most popular artists and the best mp3 players and mp3 retailers. Keys has been nominated three times.

Year	Nominee / work	Award	Result
2010	"Empire State of Mind"	The HRR Award	Nominated
2010	"Try Sleeping with a Broken Heart"	The BFV Award	Nominated
2014	"We Are Here"	The JSB Award	Nominated

== MTV Awards ==
=== MTV Africa Music Awards ===
The MTV Africa Music Awards, established in 2008, are an annual awards ceremony celebrate the most popular music in Africa. Keys has won one award.

Year	Nominee / work	Award	Result
2008	Alicia Keys	Best R&B	Won

=== MTV Asia Awards ===
The MTV Asia Awards was annual Asian awards ceremony established by the MTV television network. Keys has received two nominations.

Year	Nominee / work	Award	Result
2002	Alicia Keys	Favorite Breakthrough Artist	Nominated
2005	Alicia Keys	Favorite Female Artist	Nominated

=== MTV Europe Music Awards ===
The MTV Europe Music Awards is an event presented by MTV Networks Europe which awards prizes to musicians and performers. Keys has won three awards from ten nominations.

Year	Nominee / work	Award	Result
2002	Alicia Keys	Best R&B	Won
2004	Alicia Keys	Best Female	Nominated
2004	Alicia Keys	Best R&B	Won
2005	Alicia Keys	Best Female	Nominated
2005	Alicia Keys	Best R&B	Won
2008	Alicia Keys	Ultimate Urban	Nominated
2008	As I Am	Album of the Year	Nominated
2013	Alicia Keys	Best World Stage Performance	Nominated
2014	"We Are Here"	Best Song with a Message	Nominated
2015	Alicia Keys	Best World Stage Performance	Nominated

=== MTV Video Music Awards ===
The MTV Video Music Awards were established in 1984 by MTV to celebrate the top music videos of the year. Keys has won four awards from eighteen nominations.

Year	Nominee / work	Award	Result
2001	"Fallin'"	Best New Artist in a Video	Won
2001	"Fallin'"	MTV2 Award	Nominated
2002	"A Woman's Worth"	Best R&B Video	Nominated
2002	"A Woman's Worth"	Best Cinematography in a Video	Nominated
2004	"If I Ain't Got You"	Best Female Video	Nominated
2004	"If I Ain't Got You"	Best R&B Video	Won
2004	"You Don't Know My Name"	Best Art Direction in a Video	Nominated
2005	"Karma"	Best R&B Video	Won
2005	"My Boo"	Best R&B Video	Nominated
2010	"Empire State of Mind"	Best Collaboration	Nominated
2010	"Empire State of Mind"	Best Direction	Nominated
2010	"Empire State of Mind"	Best Cinematography	Won
2019	"Raise a Man"	Best R&B	Nominated
2020	"Underdog"	Best R&B	Nominated
2022	"City of Gods (Part II)"	Best R&B	Nominated
2023	"Stay"	Best R&B	Nominated
2023	"If I Ain't Got You" (Orchestral)	Video for Good	Nominated
2024	"Lifeline"	Best R&B	Nominated

=== MTV Video Music Awards Japan ===
The MTV Video Music Awards Japan is the Japanese version of the MTV Video Music Awards. Keys has received fourteen nominations.

Year	Nominee / work	Award	Result
2002	Alicia Keys	Best New Artist	Nominated
2002	Alicia Keys	Best R&B	Nominated
2003	"Gangsta Lovin'"	Best Collaboration	Nominated
2004	"You Don't Know My Name"	Best R&B Video	Nominated
2005	"If I Ain't Got You"	Best R&B Video	Nominated
2005	"My Boo"	Best Collaboration	Nominated
2008	"No One"	Best Female Video	Nominated
2009	"Another Way to Die"	Best Video from a Film	Nominated
2010	"Doesn't Mean Anything"	Video of the Year	Nominated
2010	"Doesn't Mean Anything"	Best R&B Video	Nominated
2010	"Empire State of Mind"	Best Hip Hop Video	Nominated
2010	"Empire State of Mind"	Best Collaboration	Nominated
2013	"Girl on Fire"	Best Female Video	Nominated
2013	"Girl on Fire"	Best R&B Video	Nominated

=== MTV Video Play Awards ===
MTV Video Play Awards are held to celebrate the most played music videos across the global MTV network. Keys has received two awards.

Year	Nominee / work	Award	Result
2010	"Empire State of Mind"	Platinum	Won
2010	"Try Sleeping with a Broken Heart"	Gold	Won

=== mtvU Woodie Awards ===
The mtvU Woodie Awards is an award show that recognizes music and artists voted best by college students. Keys has received four nominations.

Year	Nominee / work	Award	Result
2005	"Karma"	Streaming Woodie	Nominated
2005	"My Boo"	Streaming Woodie	Nominated
2007	Alicia Keys	Good Woodie	Nominated
2009	Alicia Keys	Good Woodie – Keep A Child Alive	Nominated

== MuchMusic Video Awards ==
The MuchMusic Video Awards is an annual awards ceremony presented by the Canadian music video channel MuchMusic. Keys has been nominated twice.

Year	Nominee / work	Award	Result
2008	"No One"	Best International Video – Artist	Nominated
2010	"Empire State of Mind"	International Video of the Year – Artist	Nominated

== Music Choice Video on Demand Awards ==
Year	Nominee / work	Award	Result
2008	"No One"	Most Demanded Video of the Year	Nominated

== My VH1 Music Awards ==
The My VH1 Music Awards was an annual music award ceremony held by American television network VH1. Keys has won two award from five nominations.

Year	Nominee / work	Award	Result
2001	"Fallin'"	Damn I Wish I Wrote That! (Song of the Year)	Nominated
2001	Alicia Keys	My Favorite Female	Nominated
2001	Songs in A Minor	Must Have Album	Nominated
2001	All Star Tribute: "What's Going On"	There's no "I" in "team" (Best Collaboration)	Won
2001	Alicia Keys	Welcome to the Big Time!	Won

== NAACP Image Awards ==
The NAACP Image Awards is an award presented annually by the American National Association for the Advancement of Colored People to honor outstanding people of color in film, television, music and literature. Keys has won eighteen awards from forty-nine nominations.

Year	Nominee / work	Award	Result
2002	Alicia Keys	Outstanding New Artist	Won
2002	Songs in A Minor	Outstanding Album	Won
2002	"A Woman's Worth"	Outstanding Song	Won
2002	"Fallin'"	Outstanding Song	Nominated
2002	Alicia Keys	Outstanding Female Artist	Won
2002	"Fallin'"	Outstanding Music Video	Nominated
2002	The 2001 MTV Video Music Awards	Outstanding Performance in a Variety Series/Special	Nominated
2004	Alicia Keys	Outstanding Female Artist	Won
2004	"You Don't Know My Name"	Outstanding Song	Nominated
2004	The Diary of Alicia Keys	Outstanding Album	Nominated
2005	"My Boo"	Outstanding Music Video	Nominated
2005	"If I Ain't Got You	Outstanding Music Video	Won
2005	"If I Ain't Got You	Outstanding Song	Won
2006	Alicia Keys	Outstanding Female Artist	Won
2006	"Unbreakable"	Outstanding Song	Won
2006	"Unbreakable"	Outstanding Music Video	Won
2006	Unplugged	Outstanding Album	Nominated
2008	Alicia Keys	Outstanding Female Artist	Won
2008	"Like You'll Never See Me Again"	Outstanding Music Video	Won
2008	"Like You'll Never See Me Again"	Outstanding Song	Won
2008	As I Am	Outstanding Album	Won
2009	Alicia Keys	Outstanding Female Artist	Nominated
2009	"Superwoman"	Outstanding Music Video	Nominated
2009	"Superwoman"	Outstanding Song	Nominated
2009	The Secret Life of Bees	Outstanding Supporting Actress in a Motion Picture	Nominated
2010	Alicia Keys	Outstanding Female Artist	Nominated
2010	"Empire State of Mind"	Outstanding Duo, Group or Collaboration	Nominated
2010	"Empire State of Mind"	Outstanding Song	Nominated
2010	"Try Sleeping with a Broken Heart"	Outstanding Music Video	Nominated
2010	The Element of Freedom	Outstanding Album	Nominated
2011	"Un-thinkable (I'm Ready)"	Outstanding Song	Nominated
2011	"Un-thinkable (I'm Ready)"	Outstanding Music Video	Won
2013	Alicia Keys	Outstanding Female Artist	Won
2013	"Girl on Fire"	Outstanding Music Video	Won
2013	Girl On Fire	Outstanding Music Album	Nominated
2014	"Fire We Make"	Outstanding Duo, Group or Collaboration	Nominated
2014	"Fire We Make"	Outstanding Music Video	Nominated
2014	"Fire We Make"	Outstanding Song	Nominated
2015	Alicia Keys	Outstanding Female Artist	Nominated
2015	"We Are Here"	Outstanding Song	Won
2017	Alicia Keys	Outstanding Female Artist	Nominated
2017	"Blended Family"	Outstanding Duo, Group or Collaboration	Nominated
2017	"In Common"	Outstanding Music Video	Nominated
2020	"Show Me Love"	Outstanding Duo, Group or Collaboration	Nominated
2021	Alicia Keys	Outstanding Female Artist	Nominated
2021	Alicia	Outstanding Album	Nominated
2021	"Jill Scott"	Outstanding Duo, Group or Collaboration (Traditional)	Nominated
2021	"So Done"	Outstanding Duo, Group or Collaboration (Contemporary)	Nominated
2023	"City of Gods"	Outstanding Hip Hop/Rap Song	Nominated

== National Music Publishers Association Awards ==
National Music Publishers' Association is a trade association for the American music publishing industry who honored the songwriters behind most popular music.

Year	Nominee / work	Award	Result
2018	Alicia Keys	Songwriter Icon Award	Won

== New York Music Awards ==
The New York Music Awards celebrates New York-born-and-raised and NY-based/NY-identified artists and their recordings. Keys has received two awards.

Year	Nominee / work	Award	Result
2010	"Try Sleeping with a Broken Heart"	Best R&B Single	Won
2010	Alicia Keys	Best R&B Songwriter	Won

== News and Documentary Emmy Awards ==
The News and Documentary Emmy Awards are part of the extensive range of Emmy Awards for artistic and technical merit for the American television industry. Bestowed by the National Academy of Television Arts and Sciences (NATAS), the News & Documentary Emmys are presented in recognition of excellence in American news and documentary programming.

Year	Nominee / work	Award	Result
2022	A Choice of Weapons: Inspired by Gordon Parks	Best Documentary	Nominated
2022	A Choice of Weapons: Inspired by Gordon Parks	Outstanding Arts and Culture Documentary	Nominated

== Nickelodeon Kids' Choice Awards ==
The Nickelodeon Kids' Choice Awards is an annual awards showthat honors the year's biggest television, movie, and music acts, as voted by Nickelodeon viewers. Keys has been nominated five times.

Year	Nominee / work	Award	Result
2005	"My Boo"	Favorite Song	Nominated
2005	Alicia Keys	Favorite Female Singer	Nominated
2006	Alicia Keys	Favorite Female Singer	Nominated
2008	Alicia Keys	Favorite Female Singer	Nominated
2009	Alicia Keys	Favorite Female Singer	Nominated

== NME Awards ==
The NME Awards is a music awards show hosted by music magazine NME. Keys has been nominated once.

Year	Nominee / work	Award	Result
2002	Alicia Keys	Best R&B Act	Nominated

== NRJ Music Awards ==
A major Award Ceremony that takes place in cannes, France.

Year	Nominee / work	Award	Result
2005	The Diary of Alicia Keys	International Album of the Year	Nominated
2005	Alicia Keys & Usher	Best Collaboration	Nominated
2005	Alicia Keys	Best International Female	Nominated
2008	Alicia Keys	Best International Female	Nominated
2010	"Empire State of Mind" (ft. Jay-Z)	Best Collaboration Internationale	Nominated
2010	Alicia Keys	Best International Female	Nominated
2013	Alicia Keys	Best International Female	Nominated
2019	Alicia Keys & Pedro Capó	Best International Duo/Group	Nominated
2019	"Calma" (ft. Pedro Capó)	Best International Song	Nominated

== NRJ Radio Awards ==
Year	Nominee / work	Award	Result
2002	Alicia Keys	Best New International Artist	Won

== O Music Awards ==
The O Music Awards is an awards show presented by Viacom to honor music, technology and intersection between the two. Keys has received one nomination.

Year	Nominee / work	Award	Result
2013	Alicia Keys	Most Inspiring Fan Outreach	Nominated

== People's Choice Awards ==
The People's Choice Awards is an annual awards show recognizing the people and the work of popular culture. Keys has won two awards from nine nominations.

Year	Nominee / work	Award	Result
2005	Alicia Keys	Favorite Female Musical Performer	Won
2009	Alicia Keys	Favorite Female Musical Performer	Nominated
2009	"No One"	Favorite R&B Song	Won
2009	"Another Way to Die"	Favorite Song from a Soundtrack	Nominated
2009	Favorite Star 35 & Under	Alicia Keys	Nominated
2010	Alicia Keys	Best R&B Artist	Nominated
2010	Alicia Keys	Favorite Online Sensation	Nominated
2012	Alicia Keys	Favorite R&B Artist	Nominated
2013	Alicia Keys	Favorite R&B Artist	Nominated

== Pianote Awards ==
Year	Nominee / work	Award	Result
2025	Alicia Keys	Pianist of the Year	Nominated

== Pop Awards ==
The Pop Awards are presented annually by Pop Magazine. Alicia Keys has one win from two nominations.

Year	Nominee / work	Award	Result
2021	Alicia Keys	Artist of the Year Award	Nominated
2021	"Underdog"	Music Video of the Year Award	Won

== Premios 40 Principales Music Awards ==
Premios 40 Principales is an annual Spanish award show by the musical radio station Los 40 Principales. Keys has won one award.

Year	Nominee / work	Award	Result
2008	Alicia Keys	Best Non-Spanish International Artist	Nominated
2008	"No One"	Best Non-Spanish International Song	Nominated
2010	"Looking for Paradise"	Best Song	Nominated
2012	Alicia Keys	Best Non-Spanish International Artist	Nominated
2012	Alicia Keys	Best American Singer-Songwriter Of The Last Decade	Won

== Premios Amigo ==
The Premios Amigo was a music award ceremony in Spain, presented annually by Productores de Música de España.

Year	Nominee / work	Award	Result
2002	Alicia Keys	Mejor artista revelación	Won

== Premio Lo Nuestro ==
Premios Lo Nuestro is an awards show honoring the best of Latin music, presented by television network Univision. Keys has been nominated once.

Year	Nominee / work	Award	Result
2011	"Looking for Paradise"	Collaboration of the Year	Nominated

== Premios Ondas ==
Premios Ondas are given to recognize professionals in the fields of radio and television broadcasting, the cinema, and the music industry. Keys has won two awards.

Year	Nominee / work	Award	Result
2007	Alicia Keys	Mención Especial del Jurado	Won
2010	"Looking for Paradise"	Mejor canción	Won

== Premios Oye! ==
Premios Oye! awards are presented annually by the Academia Nacional de la Música en México for outstanding achievements in Mexican record industry. Keys has received four nominations.

Year	Nominee / work	Award	Result
2002	Alicia Keys	Revelación del Año	Nominated
2008	As I Am	General Inglés/Álbum del año	Nominated
2008	"No One"	General Inglés/Canción del año	Nominated
2010	The Element of Freedom	General Inglés/Album del Año	Nominated

== Primetime Emmy Awards ==
The Primetime Emmy Award is an American accolade bestowed by the Academy of Television Arts & Sciences in recognition of excellence in American primetime television programming, were first held in 1949 at the Hollywood Athletic Club.

Year	Nominee / work	Award	Result
2019	61st Annual Grammy Awards	Primetime Emmy Award for Outstanding Variety Special (Live)	Nominated
2021	American Masters	Outstanding Documentary or Nonfiction Series	Nominated

== Producers Guild of America Awards ==
The Producers Guild of America's "Digital 25" awards program recognizes individuals or teams who have made exceptional contributions to the advancement of digital entertainment and storytelling. Keys has won one award.

Year	Nominee / work	Award	Result
2011	Alicia Keys	Digital 25: Leaders in Emerging Entertainment	Won

== Professional Performing Arts School Awards ==
Year	Nominee / work	Award	Result
2011	Alicia Keys	The first PPAS Alumni Outstanding Achievement	Won

== Record of the Year ==
The Record of the Year is an award voted by the UK public. Keys has been nominated once.

Year	Nominee / work	Award	Result
2010	"Empire State of Mind (Part II) Broken Down"	Record of the Year	Nominated

== Resonator Awards ==
Year	Nominee / work	Award	Result
2024	Alicia Keys	Resonator Hall of Fame	Won

== RTHK International Pop Poll Awards ==
The RTHK International Pop Poll Awards is an annual award show in Hong Kong that honors the best in international and national music. Keys has won two awards.

Year	Nominee / work	Award	Result
2011	"Empire State of Mind"	Top Ten International Gold Songs	Won
2011	"Put It in a Love Song"	Top Ten International Gold Songs	Nominated
2011	Alicia Keys	Top Female Artist	Nominated
2013	"Girl on Fire"	Top Ten International Gold Songs	Won
2013	Alicia Keys	Top Female Artist	Nominated

== Shorty Awards ==
Year	Nominee / work	Award	Result
2016	Alicia Keys	Musician	Nominated

== Songwriter's Hall of Fame Awards ==
The Songwriter's Hall of Fame Awards celebrates established songwriters. Keys has received one award.

Year	Nominee / work	Award	Result
2005	Alicia Keys	Hal David Starlight Award	Won

== Soul Train Awards ==
=== Soul Train Music Awards ===
The Soul Train Music Awards is an annual award show that honors the best in African American music and entertainment. Keys has won nine awards from eighteen nominations.

Year	Nominee / work	Award	Result
2002	"Fallin'"	Best R&B/Soul Single, Female	Nominated
2002	Songs in A Minor	Best R&B/Soul Album, Female	Won
2002	Songs in A Minor	R&B/Soul or Rap Album of the Year	Nominated
2002	Alicia Keys	Best R&B/Soul or Rap New Artist	Won
2002	Alicia Keys	Entertainer of the Year	Won
2004	"You Don't Know My Name"	Best R&B/Soul Single, Female	Won
2005	"If I Ain't Got You"	Best R&B/Soul Single, Female	Won
2005	"My Boo"	Best R&B/Soul Single by a Duo or Group	Won
2005	The Diary of Alicia Keys	Best R&B/ Soul Album, Female	Won
2006	"Unbreakable"	Best Female R&B/Soul Single	Nominated
2010	The Element of Freedom	Album of the Year	Nominated
2010	"Un-Thinkable (I'm Ready)"	Song of the Year	Nominated
2010	"Un-Thinkable (I'm Ready)"	Record of the Year	Won
2010	Alicia Keys	Best R&B/Soul Female Artist	Won
2013	Alicia Keys	Best R&B/Soul Female Artist	Nominated
2013	"Fire We Make"	The Ashford and Simpson Songwriter's Award	Nominated
2013	"Fire We Make"	Best Collaboration	Nominated
2016	Alicia Keys	Best R&B/Soul Female Artist	Nominated
2019	"Raise a Man"	Video of the Year	Nominated
2020	Alicia Keys	Best R&B/Soul Female Artist	Nominated
2021	Alicia Keys	Best R&B/Soul Female Artist	Nominated

=== Soul Train Lady of Soul Awards ===
The Soul Train Lady of Soul Awards is an awards show that honors the accomplishments of women in the music industry. Keys has won two awards from seven nominations.

Year	Nominee / work	Award	Result
2001	"Fallin'"	Best R&B/Soul Single, Solo	Nominated
2001	Alicia Keys	Best R&B/Soul or Rap New Artist, Solo	Nominated
2002	"A Woman's Worth"	Best R&B/Soul Single, Solo	Nominated
2002	Songs in A Minor	R&B/Soul Album of the Year, Solo Artist	Won
2002	"Fallin'"	R&B/Soul or Rap Song of the Year	Nominated
2005	"Karma"	Best R&B/Soul Single, Solo	Nominated
2005	"If I Ain't Got You"	R&B/Soul or Rap Song of the Year	Won

== Source Hip-Hop Music Awards ==
Source Hip-Hop Music Awards are presented by the hip hop magazine The Source. Keys has won one award.

Year	Nominee / work	Award	Result
2004	Alicia Keys	R&B Artist of the Year	Won

== Spin Magazine Reader's Poll ==
Year	Nominee / work	Award	Result
2002	Alicia Keys	Best Solo Artist	Won

== Swiss Music Awards ==
The Swiss Music Awards is an award show that honors national and international musicians. Keys has won one award.

Year	Nominee / work	Award	Result
2008	As I Am	Best Foreign Urban Album	Won
2011	The Element of Freedom	Best Foreign Urban Album	Nominated

== TEC Awards ==
The TEC Awards is an annual award show recognizing the achievements of audio professionals. Keys has been nominated five times.

Year	Nominee / work	Award	Result
2002	"Fallin'"	Outstanding Creative Achievement – Record Production/Single or Track	Nominated
2002	Songs in A Minor	Outstanding Creative Achievement – Record Production/Album	Nominated
2008	"No One"	Outstanding Creative Achievement – Record Production/Single or Track	Nominated
2011	"Empire State of Mind"	Outstanding Creative Achievement – Record Production/Single	Nominated
2013	Girl on Fire	Outstanding Creative Achievement – Record Production/Album	Nominated

== Teen Choice Awards ==
The Teen Choice Awards is an awards show presented annually by the Fox Broadcasting Company. Keys has been nominated eleven times.

Year	Nominee / work	Award	Result
2002	Songs in A Minor	Choice Album	Nominated
2002	"Fallin'"	Choice Single	Nominated
2002	Alicia Keys	Choice Female Artist	Nominated
2002	"Gangsta Lovin'" Eve feat. Alicia Keys	Choice Hook Up	Nominated
2005	The Diary of Alicia Keys	Choice Album	Nominated
2005	Alicia Keys	Choice Female Artist	Nominated
2005	Alicia Keys	Choice R&B Artist	Nominated
2008	"No One"	Choice Love Song	Nominated
2010	Alicia Keys	Choice Music: R&B Artist	Nominated
2010	The Element of Freedom	Choice Album	Nominated
2013	Alicia Keys	Choice R&B Artist	Nominated

== The Recording Academy New York Chapter honors ==
Year	Nominee / work	Award	Result
2007	Alicia Keys	New York Chapter's Recording Academy Honors	Won

== TMF Awards (Netherlands) ==
Keys has won one award.

Year	Nominee / work	Award	Result
2005	Alicia Keys	Internationaal/Beste Urban	Won
2005	Usher & Alicia Keys	Internationaal/Beste Videoclip	Nominated

== TRL Awards ==
The TRL Awards are presented by MTV Italy to celebrate the most popular artists and music videos in Italy. Keys has received one nomination.

Year	Nominee / work	Award	Result
2008	Alicia Keys	First Lady	Nominated

== UK Music Video Awards ==
Year	Nominee / work	Award	Result
2017	Alicia Keys in Paris - A Take Away Show	Best Live Session	Nominated

== Vibe Awards ==
The Vibe Awards are an annual award ceremony that honor hip hop, R&B and soul musicians. Keys has won two awards from four nominations.

Year	Nominee / work	Award	Result
2004	Alicia Keys	Artist of the Year	Won
2004	"If I Ain't Got You"	Reelest Video	Nominated
2004	Alicia Keys	R&B Voice of the Year	Nominated
2004	"If I Ain't Got You"	Best R&B Song	Won

== VIVA Comet Awards ==
The VIVA Comet Awards is a German pop music award ceremony, presented by the television channel VIVA. Keys has been nominated once.

Year	Nominee / work	Award	Result
2002	Alicia Keys	Newcomer International	Nominated

== Webby Awards ==
The Webby Awards is an annual award show for excellence on the Internet presented by the International Academy of Digital Arts and Sciences.

Year	Nominee / work	Award	Result
2014	Greater than AIDS: Alicia Keys for Empowered	Public Service and Activism	Won
2014	Greater than AIDS: Alicia Keys for Empowered	People's Voice Award	Nominated

== Woodie King Jr.'s New Federal Theatre Award ==
In commemoration of the 40th anniversary of the Woodie King Jr.'s New Federal Theatre, special awards were given to people who have changed the cultural life of the United States. Alicia Keys was one of the recipients.

Year	Nominee / work	Award	Result
2011	Alicia Keys	Special Award	Won

== World Music Awards ==
The World Music Awards is an international awards show that annually honors musicians based on their worldwide sales figures, which are provided by the International Federation of the Phonographic Industry. Keys has won three awards.

Year	Nominee / work	Award	Result
2002	Alicia Keys	Best-Selling R&B/Hip Hop Artist	Won
2004	Alicia Keys	Best Selling R&B Artist	Won
2008	Alicia Keys	Best Selling R&B Female	Won
2010	Alicia Keys	Best R&B Artist	Nominated
2014	Alicia Keys	World's Best Live Act	Nominated

== Unite4:Humanity Awards ==
Year	Nominee / work	Award	Result
2014	Alicia Keys	Music Visionary Award	Won
