= BET Hip Hop Award for Album of the Year =

Annual music award

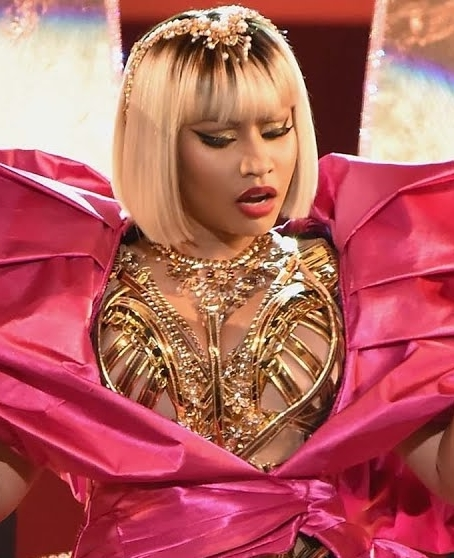
- Pink Friday 2 by Nicki Minaj, the 2024 recipient
- Awarded for: Excellent hip hop albums
- Country: United States (US)
- Presented by: Black Entertainment Television (BET)
- First award: 2006

Highlights
- Most awards: Jay-Z, T.I., Kendrick Lamar and Drake (3)
- Most nominations: Drake (8)

The BET Hip Hop Award for Album of the Year is an award presented to recording artists for quality album at the BET Hip Hop Awards. It was originally titled CD of the Year, but it was changed during the 2013 ceremony.

== Recipients ==
"‡" Indicates the album was nominated for the Grammy Award for Best Rap Album.
"†" Indicates the album won the Grammy Award for Best Rap Album.

Year	Recipients	Work	Nominees	Ref.
2006	T.I.	King ‡	Lil Wayne – Tha Carter II; Young Jeezy – Let's Get It: Thug Motivation 101; Lupe Fiasco – Food & Liquor ‡; Kanye West – Late Registration †	
2007	T.I.	T.I. vs. T.I.P. ‡	Jay-Z – Kingdom Come ‡; Ludacris – Release Therapy †; Nas – Hip Hop Is Dead ‡	
2007	Common	Finding Forever ‡	Jay-Z – Kingdom Come ‡; Ludacris – Release Therapy †; Nas – Hip Hop Is Dead ‡	
2008	Lil Wayne	Tha Carter III †	Jay-Z – American Gangster ‡; Lupe Fiasco – Lupe Fiasco's The Cool ‡; Nas – Untitled ‡; Kanye West – Graduation †	
2009	T.I.	Paper Trail ‡	Eminem – Relapse †; Q-Tip – The Renaissance ‡; Kanye West – 808s & Heartbreak; Young Jeezy – The Recession	
2010	Jay-Z	The Blueprint 3 ‡	B.o.B – B.o.B Presents: The Adventures of Bobby Ray ‡; Eminem – Recovery †; Drake – Thank Me Later ‡; Rick Ross – Teflon Don	
2011	Kanye West	My Beautiful Dark Twisted Fantasy †	Big Sean – Finally Famous; Lupe Fiasco – Lasers ‡; Nicki Minaj – Pink Friday ‡; Wiz Khalifa – Rolling Papers	
2012	The Throne (Jay-Z & Kanye West)	Watch the Throne ‡	Common – The Dreamer/The Believer; Drake – Take Care †; J. Cole – Cole World: The Sideline Story; Young Jeezy – TM103: Hustlerz Ambition	
2013	Kendrick Lamar	good kid, m.A.A.d city ‡	J. Cole – Born Sinner; Jay Z – Magna Carta Holy Grail ‡; Nas – Life Is Good ‡; Wale – The Gifted	
2014	Drake	Nothing Was the Same ‡	Eminem - The Marshall Mathers LP 2 †; Future - Honest; Rick Ross - Mastermind; Schoolboy Q - Oxymoron ‡; Yo Gotti - I Am	
2015	J. Cole	2014 Forest Hills Drive ‡	Big Sean - Dark Sky Paradise; Drake - If You're Reading This It's Too Late ‡; Kendrick Lamar - To Pimp A Butterfly †; Nicki Minaj - The Pinkprint ‡; Wale - The Album About Nothing	
2016	Drake	Views ‡	DJ Khaled – I Changed a Lot; Dr. Dre – Compton ‡; Fetty Wap – Fetty Wap; Future – DS2; Kanye West – The Life of Pablo ‡	
2017	Kendrick Lamar	Damn †	DJ Khaled – Grateful; Future – Future; J. Cole – 4 Your Eyez Only; Jay-Z – 4:44 ‡; Migos – Culture ‡	
2018	The Carters (Beyoncé & Jay-Z)	Everything Is Love	Cardi B – Invasion of Privacy †; Drake – Scorpion; J. Cole – KOD; Migos – Culture II	
2019	Travis Scott	Astroworld ‡	Lizzo – Cuz I Love You; DJ Khaled – Father Of Asahd; Tyler, the Creator – IGOR †; Meek Mill – Championships ‡	
2020	Roddy Ricch	Please Excuse Me for Being Antisocial	Future – High Off Life; DaBaby – Blame It on Baby; DaBaby – Kirk; Lil Baby – My Turn; Megan Thee Stallion – Suga	
2021	Tyler, the Creator	Call Me If You Get Lost †	Moneybagg Yo – A Gangsta's Pain; Migos – Culture III; Megan Thee Stallion – Good News; DJ Khaled – Khaled Khaled; 21 Savage and Metro Boomin – Savage Mode II; J. Cole – The Off-Season ‡	
2022	Kendrick Lamar	Mr. Morale & the Big Steppers †	Latto – 777; Drake – Certified Lover Boy (Note: Certified Lover Boy was nominated for the Grammy Award for Best Rap Album until Drake withdrew the album from Grammy consideration.); Kanye West – Donda ‡; Future – I Never Liked You ‡; Pusha T – It's Almost Dry ‡; Nas – King's Disease II ‡	
2023	Drake & 21 Savage	Her Loss ‡	GloRilla – Anyways, Life's Great; Coi Leray – Coi; DJ Khaled – God Did ‡; Metro Boomin – Heroes & Villains ‡; Jack Harlow – Jackman; Lil Uzi Vert – Pink Tape; Megan Thee Stallion – Traumazine	
2024	Nicki Minaj	Pink Friday 2	21 Savage – American Dream; GloRilla – Ehhthang Ehhthang; Drake – For All the Dogs Scary Hours Edition; Sexyy Red – In Sexyy We Trust; Megan Thee Stallion – Megan; Gunna – One of Wun; Future & Metro Boomin – We Don't Trust You‡; Travis Scott – Utopia‡	

== Category facts ==
Artists that received multiple nominations
Nominations	Artist
9	Drake
7	Jay-Z
6	Kanye West
5	Future
5	J. Cole
5	DJ Khaled
4	Kendrick Lamar
4	Megan Thee Stallion
3	21 Savage
3	Eminem
3	Lupe Fiasco
3	Metro Boomin
3	Nas
3	Nicki Minaj
3	T.I.
3	Jeezy
2	Big Sean
2	Common
2	DaBaby
2	Glorilla
2	Lil Wayne
2	Migos
2	Rick Ross
2	Wale

Artists that received multiple awards
Awards	Artist
3	Jay-Z
3	T.I.
3	Kendrick Lamar
3	Drake
2	Kanye West
