= Good Life (Kanye West song) =

2007 song by Kanye West

Single by Kanye West featuring T-Pain

from the album Graduation
- B-side: "Can't Tell Me Nothing" (Remix)
- Released: October 2, 2007
- Studio: Doppler (Atlanta); The Record Plant (Hollywood)
- Genre: Pop rap; Southern hip-hop; electronic
- Length: 3:27
- Label: Roc-A-Fella; Def Jam
- Songwriters: Kanye West; Aldrin Davis; Faheem Najm; John Stephens; James Ingram; Quincy Jones
- Producers: Kanye West; Mike Dean; DJ Toomp

Kanye West singles chronology
"Stronger" (2007)	"Good Life" (2007)	"Pro Nails" (2007)

T-Pain singles chronology
"Kiss Kiss" (2007)	"Good Life" (2007)	"Church" (2007)

Music video
- "Good Life" on YouTube

"Good Life" is a song by American rapper Kanye West featuring American singer T-Pain from the former's third studio album, Graduation (2007). The song includes background vocals from John Legend and Ne-Yo. West and Toomp handled the production, with additional production from Mike Dean. T-Pain thought of the concept when dining out with West, while he also recorded numerous hooks that the rapper used for his feature. On October 2, 2007, the song was released to US rhythmic contemporary radio stations by Roc-A-Fella and Def Jam as the album's third single. A pop number, it samples Michael Jackson's "P.Y.T. (Pretty Young Thing)" and features synths. Lyrically, the song sees West celebrating his success and being determined to succeed, and T-Pain also reflecting on his success.

"Good Life" received generally positive reviews from music critics, who mostly noted its commercial appeal. Some praised the composition and the sample, while a few critics highlighted West's ability to blend musical elements. The song was listed amongst the best of 2007 by multiple publications, including PopMatters and Eye Weekly. It was awarded Best Collaboration and Best Rap Song at the BET Awards 2008 and the 50th Annual Grammy Awards, respectively. In the United States, the song peaked at number seven on the Billboard Hot 100, while topping the Hot Rap Songs chart. It reached the top 40 in seven other countries, including New Zealand and the United Kingdom. The song has been certified triple platinum and gold in the US and the UK by the Recording Industry Association of America (RIAA) and British Phonographic Industry (BPI), respectively.

An accompanying music video was released in September 2007, which uses an extended version of the song. In the video, West and T-Pain appear alongside colorful cartoon sketches and lyrics spelt out, set against a backdrop that changes from white to black. The visual won Best Hip-Hop Video at the 2008 BET Hip Hop Awards, as well as Best Special Effects at the 2008 MTV Video Music Awards. West performed "Good Life" live at the Coachella and Glastonbury festivals in 2011 and 2015, respectively. He delivered a performance of it at the closing ceremony of the 2015 Pan American Games, throwing his microphone after experiencing technical issues. A mashup of the song and Daft Punk's "Doin' It Right" was released by the Hood Internet in May 2013, under the title of "Doin' It Good".

== Background ==
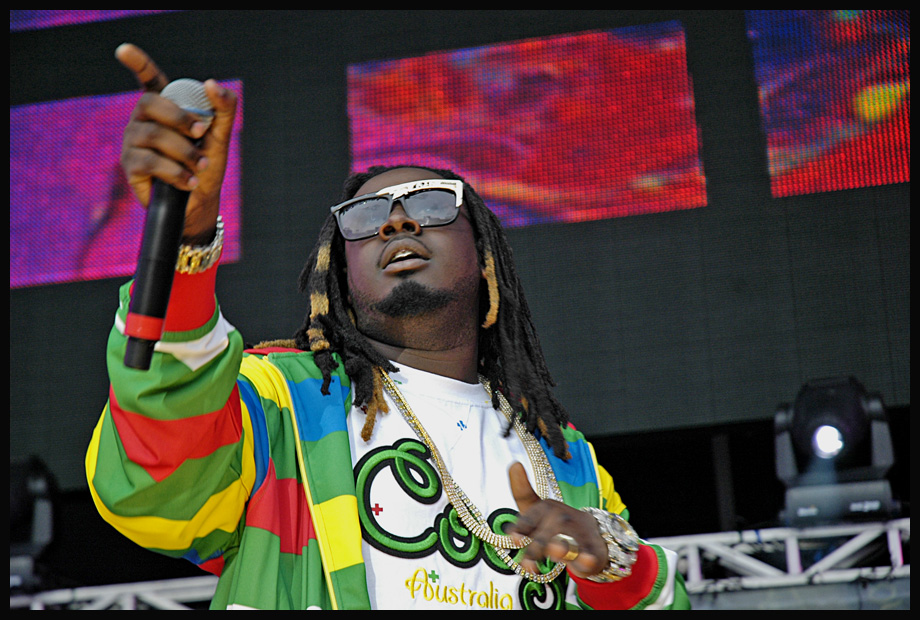
T-Pain recorded numerous hooks for the song, which West combined to make up the singer's appearance.

"Good Life" was produced by Kanye West and record producer Toomp, with additional production from Mike Dean. Toomp remembered that a lot of the GOOD Music crew were in the studio when creating the song and said "it felt like a party up in there while working on that record". The creation began with West playing a sample of Michael Jackson's "P.Y.T. (Pretty Young Thing)" (1983), saying that he "always wanted to do something with this", and the group then started playing with the sample. West sent the sample sounds over to his keyboard to work with, before he sang the melody and brought in the bassline as he added more to the beat, followed by a few players contributing the synthesizers. Toomp and West's work showed his different creative process from other collaborators; the rapper would say, "Alright, I like this. I'm going to put my man Craig in here to put these keys on here." The producer said that they "wanted a professional keyboardist to bless that shit" and considered "about four different artists" for the hook, also including R&B singer-songwriter Ne-Yo in the recording sessions, until T-Pain was decided on as the performer and going through this process taught him about "taking your time and not settling with what you [first] hear".

West and T-Pain spent time in the studio together, most notably working on "Good Life". Speaking on his 'At: Guitar Center' podcast in 2011, T-Pain said that he thought of the song's concept when dining at a restaurant with West, focusing on him ordering lobster and Cristal while he "didn't know I was coming up with these things in my head" while he ordered, after they both arrived in their cars: "It's like, this is the good life." Once the singer heard the beat, he instinctively thought "this is what this song is about".

According to record producer Jeff Bhasker, West said on his Glow in the Dark Tour that singing T-Pain's parts of the song through Auto-Tune live inspired his fourth studio album 808s & Heartbreak in 2008. West used the vocal technique for the album, to which T-Pain responded by voicing his approval: "He just had me in mind." The singer contributed songwriting to the album's track "RoboCop" and in 2015, he told Billboard that West was inspired by his 2005 debut album Rappa Ternt Sanga for 808s & Heartbreak and also recruited him to create a similar sound. T-Pain revealed that all his recordings for "Good Life" were hooks, recording five different versions of the chorus. These hooks did not appeal to West, who desired a different one "that was real anthemic and blew his mind right away". T-Pain explained that West's solution was too "put all them hooks together" for the song while also placing one at the end of the song to serve as the bridge, calling him "a genius" after the final edit. West sped up the sample of "P.Y.T. (Pretty Young Thing)" for the song, a chipmunk soul technique he had utilized frequently since his debut single "Through the Wire" (2003).

== Composition and lyrics ==
"Good Life"
"Good Life" received praise for its mix of orchestral and electronic sounds, multitracked vocals from T-Pain, and overall positive energy.

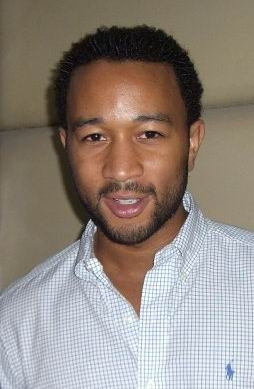
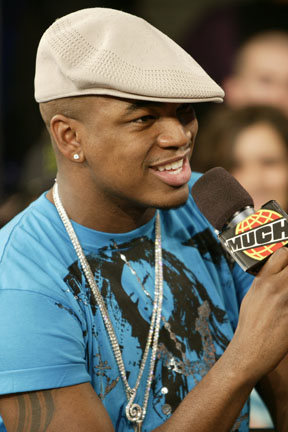
John Legend (left) and Ne-Yo (right) deliver background vocals for the song's final refrains, replacing the Auto-Tuned vocals provided by T-Pain on the hook.

Musically, "Good Life" is a pop number, with elements of soul music. It is built around a sped-up sample of the outro to "P.Y.T. (Pretty Young Thing)", written by Quincy Jones and James Ingram, and performed by Jackson. Numerous writers noted the song's summer style. It features layered, squealing synths, performed by Omar Edwards, who also contributed piano. Violin was played by Eric Gorfain and Daphne Chen of string quartet the Section Quartet, while the quartet's Leah Katz contributed viola alongside Alma Fernadez. Member Richard Dodd and John Krovoza performed cello, and additional drum programming was done by record producer Timbaland. The song features multitracked vocals, including T-Pain's auto-tuned hooks on the chorus. Towards the end of the second verse, singers John Legend and Ne-Yo perform background vocals on the final refrains in place of the singer. T-Pain later sings a bridge, which serves as the song's outro.

In the lyrics of "Good Life", West celebrates his success and shows determination to succeed, alongside embracing capitalism. During the second verse, West delivers couplets that T-Pain replies to with "Welcome to the good life". West spins lyrics from fellow rapper 50 Cent's 2003 single "In da Club" that originally were about Lloyd Banks giving him advice, declaring that he suggested to him to change his style. He makes a reference to the 2006 film Snakes on a Plane, asking if one has ever had champagne on a plane "While getting some brain?/Whipped it out, she said, 'I never saw snakes on a plane.'" On the outro, T-Pain reflects on his newfound success and attention from women, including singing the hooks "Is the good life better than the life I live?" and "And now my grandmomma [sic] ain't the only girl callin['] me 'baby'."

== Release and reception ==
"Good Life" was included as the fifth track on West's third studio album Graduation on September 11, 2007. The song was serviced to US rhythmic contemporary radio stations as the album's third single on October 2, through Roc-A-Fella and Def Jam. Simultaneously, the labels released it as a digital download in the United Kingdom, with a Young Jeezy-featuring remix of fellow Graduation single "Can't Tell Me Nothing" as the B-side. The song was later issued on a CD single in the country and Australia on November 5, 2007, and the following day in the United States.

"Good Life" was met with generally positive reviews from music critics, who mostly appreciated its commercial style. Writing for The Guardian, Dorian Lynskey pointed to the "jubilant" track as among the album's "brilliant, questing pop". Hot Press author John Walshe held a similar opinion, labeling it an example of the "shimmering summertime pop" on the record. James Poletti from Dotmusic observed the song's "gospel euphoria", which had been West's signature for many of his singles. Louis Pattison of NME thought the song may be the "most luxurious, opulent-feeling production" on Graduation, predicting it to become the biggest hit due to the sample of "P.Y.T. (Pretty Young Thing)". He continued, seeing the song as the album's only point where it feels as if "hip-hop's King Midas truly just sat down and did what he does best". Similarly, Pitchfork's Mark Pytlik identified the song as an album highlight and potential hit, asserting that T-Pain's auto-tuned hooks are placed "against a bed of summery, squealing synths". At PopMatters, Dave Heaton focused on "the odd ping-pong-like sound" of the song, while stating West continues to show determination for true pop with a "big and brassy" sound like his previous album Late Registration (2005). He also remarked that through its lush soul sound, the music "exemplifies [West's] settling-in to a life of wealth and leisure". Nathan Rabin from The A.V. Club was condient the song has the signs of success, which Billboard reviewer Hillary Crosley echoed by branding it "an instant hit". In Stylus Magazine, Jayson Greene congratulated West over "the multitracked, interlocking vocals" on the song. Spin journalist Charles Aaron highlighted its "yacht-rockin' capitalist sun splash", while Jesse Mann of Prefix Mag pointed out the sample as admirable.

Some reviewers were less impressed with "Good Life". For Slant Magazine, Eric Henderson praised the sample for West bringing the pitch down "to T-Pain's wholly synthetic level" and how the rapper layers synths reminiscent of Sale of the Century around him, as this shows his ability "to bury ones weaker arguments within their showier claims" that every student should learn, though complained the "vocal Gizmodgery makes me want to throw a shawt one" at the singer. Alex Fletcher was rather mixed in Digital Spy, affirming that the song checks the boxes of a "classic but slightly obscure sample", bravado lyricism, and "squelching Timbaland-style beats", yet doubted the commercial ability. He elaborated that West disappointed him with a "plodding, predictable trundle" and despite the appeal of the rapper repeatedly proclaiming his greatness, "with tunes like this, he'll end up looking rather daft". Jesal 'Jay Soul' Padania from RapReviews named the song a "guilty pleasure" that is aided by T-Pain's vocals, yet lacks inspiration because of "the underwhelming chorus – the song's heart is in the right place, but the execution lets it down".

=== Accolades ===
Amazon.com editors selected "Good Life" as the ninth best song of 2007, whereas PopMatters named it the year's 10th best, with Dan Nishimoto praising the "feel-good-anthem" for its production and lyrics. On a poll taken by Eye Weekly of critics across Canada for 2007, the track was ranked as the 17th best song, scoring 210 points. It was voted in at 27th on The Village Voice's Pazz & Jop poll for that year, receiving 15 mentions and tying with 3 other tracks. In 2010, Beats Per Minute ranked the track as the 72nd best of the 2000s decade; Sean Highkin highlighted the sample and T-Pain's usage of auto-tune. Two years later, Complex picked it as the 55th best song of their decade, which spanned from when the magazine was founded in 2002 to its 10th anniversary in 2012.

== Awards and nominations ==
"Good Life" received a total of 13 nominations for music awards and won eight. The song won the awards of Best Collaboration at the 2008 BET Awards and Best Rap Song at the 2008 Grammy Awards, beating "Can't Tell Me Nothing" for the latter. At the same ceremony, "Good Life" received a nomination for Best Rap/Sung Collaboration, while it was nominated for Track of the Year at the 2008 BET Hip Hop Awards.

Awards and nominations for "Good Life"
Year	Ceremony	Category	Result	Ref.
2008	BET Awards	Best Collaboration	Won	
2008	BET Hip Hop Awards	Track of the Year	Nominated	
2008	BET Hip Hop Awards	Best Hip-Hop Collabo	Nominated	
2008	BMI R&B/Hip-Hop Awards	Award Winning Songs	Won	
2008	Grammy Awards	Best Rap Song	Won	
2008	Grammy Awards	Best Rap/Sung Collaboration	Nominated	
2009	ASCAP Pop Music Awards	Most Performed Songs	Won	
2009	ASCAP Rhythm & Soul Music Awards	Award Winning Rap Songs	Won	
2009	ASCAP Rhythm & Soul Music Awards	Award Winning R&B/Hip-Hop Songs	Won	
2009	People's Choice Awards	Favorite Hip-Hop Song	Nominated	

== Music video ==
=== Background ===
West and T-Pain shown performing the song on a TV screen in the music video, set against a white backdrop with digital effects

The music video for "Good Life" was released in September 2007. It was directed by Jonas & François, who had previously directed the visual for "D.A.N.C.E." by Justice, a band that West's "Touch the Sky" lost an award to at the 2006 MTV Europe Music Awards. West used a largely different version of the song for the video, which he insisted on T-Pain listening to before the shooting began. Produced by Soixante Quin5e, animation was done by So Me and Thomas Marvel served as director of photography.

=== Synopsis and reception ===
The music video casts West and T-Pain against a white backdrop, heavily accompanied by digital effects. A colorful theme is harbored, showing cartoon sketches and spelling out the song's lyrics. Visuals also echo the lyrics, beginning with hands being thrown up and police vehicles appearing on duty. Additional visuals include West leaning on his Ferrari and performing "Good Life" with T-Pain through TV screens. The music video features a cameo from rapper and model LoLa Monroe. Towards the end of the video, the backdrop turns black as the performers are shown enjoying a rich lifestyle while joined by women.

At the 2008 BET Hip Hop Awards, the visual was awarded Best Hip-Hop Video. The music video won Best Special Effects at the 2008 MTV Video Music Awards, while it received a nomination for Video of the Year at the 2008 BET Awards.

== Commercial performance ==
"Good Life" entered the US Billboard Hot 100 at number 14, standing as the highest entry in the same week as fellow Graduation single "Stronger" topped the chart. It peaked at the seventh position of the Hot 100 on November 10, 2007, becoming West's second consecutive top-10 single from the album, as well as T-Pain's sixth track to reach this ranking. The song fell down to number eight on the chart a week later, before rebounding to its peak position on November 24, remaining there for the following week. In total, the song spent 21 weeks on the Hot 100. It ranks as West's 10th biggest hit on the chart up to May 31, 2018. "Good Life" debuted at number 63 on the Billboard Hot R&B/Hip-Hop Songs chart during the week of September 22, 2007, where it eventually peaked at number three. The song topped the US Hot Rap Songs chart, marking West's third number-one on the chart. It further peaked at number three on the US Rhythmic chart, as well as reaching number 18 on both the Mainstream Top 40 and Pop 100 charts. By September 2020, "Good Life" was certified triple platinum for amassing 3,000,000 equivalent units in the US, standing among West's 39 certifications for the year's third quarter.

For the issue date of September 29, 2007, the track debuted on the Canadian Hot 100 at number 39. "Good Life" ultimately peaked at number 23 on the chart, while it lasted for 20 weeks. The track reached number 11 on the New Zealand Singles Chart, spending two non-consecutive weeks at this position and lasting for 15 weeks. In Australia, it debuted at number 43 on the ARIA Singles Chart and gradually climbed to number 21 over the first eight weeks. The track peaked at number 20 on the Finnish Singles Chart, while it charted at number 23 on the UK Singles Chart. "Good Life" spent 22 weeks on the chart and as of October 24, 2019, it stands as West's 26th most popular track of all time in the UK. On June 18, 2021, the track was awarded a gold certification by the British Phonographic Industry (BPI) for pushing 400,000 units in the country. It was less successful in Ireland, reaching number 24 on the Irish Singles Chart.

== Live performances ==
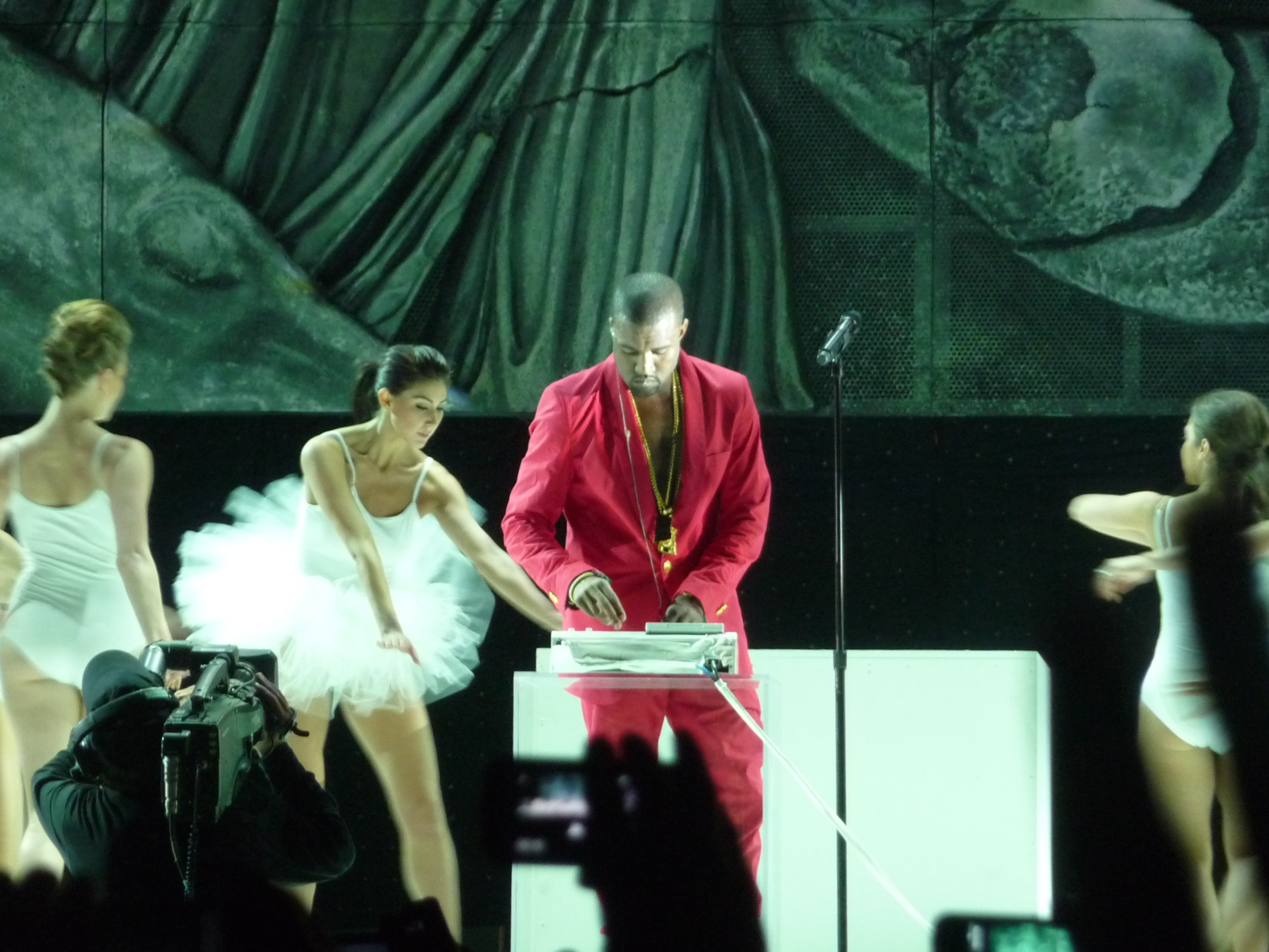
West performed the song at the 2011 Coachella Festival, utilizing its sample of "P.Y.T. (Pretty Young Thing)" for the intro.

West and T-Pain performed the song at the 2007 MTV Video Music Awards, generating excitement amongst the audience. The rapper opened the 2007 BET Hip Hop Awards by performing "Good Life" and "Can't Tell Me Nothing", wearing a Louis Vuitton rainbow scarf. On September 29, 2007, West performed a medley of "Stronger" and the former on Saturday Night Live. He performed the song on the 2008 Glow in the Dark Tour, singing T-Pain's parts in auto-tune and being backed by a live band. On October 14, West performed it on Jimmy Kimmel Live! while wearing a Sonny Crockett outfit and sang off-key at points. In February 2009, West performed the song as the seventh number for his 2010 live album VH1 Storytellers and also told the story behind it. On September 11, 2009, West delivered a performance of the song for fellow rapper Jay-Z's Answer the Call concert at Madison Square Garden (MSG) in New York City (NYC). This was preceded by the rapper telling West "Let's do it" after he asked "can I do one more before I get outta here?" West appeared with a new hairstyle that included zig-zag lines and widely excited the crowd throughout. He forgot certain lyrics, delivering an impromptu freestyle instead. On September 13, 2010, West performed the song to close his appearance for a concert at NYC's Yankee Stadium on Jay-Z and Eminem's Home and Home Tour. West used the sample of "P.Y.T. (Pretty Young Thing)" as the intro to his performance of "Good Life" at the 2011 Coachella Festival, chopping it up into the song. The rapper delivered a shortened version of it for a songs medley at 12-12-12: The Concert for Sandy Relief in MSG on December 12, 2012, as he wore a Pyrex hoodie and leather kilt.

West performed a rendition of "Good Life" at the 2013 Governors Ball. On November 20, 2013, West performed the song for his concert at the Barclays Center in Brooklyn, New York on The Yeezus Tour (2013–14), accompanied by fireworks at the start. When performing it at the Qantas Credit Union Arena in Sydney for the tour on September 12, 2014, the rapper refused to continue "until everybody stands up". He clarified that those who "got a handicap pass" and receive "special parking and shit" were exempt, accepting the two fans in wheelchairs being seated. The incident created negative media attention, with some sources falsely reporting that West berated the fans for being disabled and others criticizing him for asking they provide proof. West delivered an aggressive performance of the song for his last-minute show at KOKO in London on March 3, 2015. West's performance of it at the Time 100 gala included crowd interaction. During his headlining set at the 2015 Glastonbury Festival, West performed the song in a cherry picker that rose above the stage, engaging in a call-and-response with the audience.

West performed the song as the last number for a medley of his hits at the closing ceremony to the 2015 Pan American Games and after engaging in an "ayyy, ayyy" call-and-response with the crowd, his microphone started to cut out. The rapper continued to deliver the hook for about a minute as his vocals dropped out randomly and the backing track sang "I'm good" before going silent; he ended his appearance by throwing the microphone high into the air and then walking off the stage. Following the ceremony, rumors arose that West became angry after technical difficulties when he threw the microphone. Pan American Games Senior Vice President of Communications and Media Relations Neala Barton issued a statement decrying this, explaining West performed for his schedule timeframe and fulfilled his commitment to a high standard, despite technical difficulty "due to circumstances beyond anyone's control". The statement also denounced anyone who believed West cut his performance short or was unprofessional as incorrect, voicing Pan American Games' satisfaction with his appearance. On August 25, 2016, he performed the song on his new flying stage setup for the Saint Pablo Tour's kickoff show at the Bankers Life Fieldhouse in Indianapolis.

== Usage in media ==
West recycled lyrics from "Good Life" on his track "Take One for the Team", released on October 16, 2010, for his GOOD Fridays series. On May 22, 2013, the Hood Internet released a mashup of "Good Life" and Daft Punk's "Doin' It Right" (2013), titled "Doin' It Good". Sammie interpolated the line "Welcome to the good life" on the track "Good Life" featuring Rick Ross, released on August 31, 2017. A vocal chop of West's line "Summertime Chi" was utilized for Lee Foss, John Summit, and Hayley May's 2020 track named after the line.

== Track listings ==
CD single

1. "Good Life" (Explicit Album Version)
2. "Good Life" (Instrumental)
3. "Can't Tell Me Nothing" (Remix)
4. "Good Life" [Video-Track]

CD Maxi

1. "Good Life" (Explicit Album) – 3:30
2. "Good Life" (Instrumental) – 3:27
3. "Can't Tell Me Nothing" (Remix) [featuring Young Jeezy] – 4:11
4. "Good Life" (Video-Track) – 3:50

== Credits and personnel ==
Information taken from Graduation liner notes.

Recording

- Recorded at Doppler Studios (Atlanta, GA), Sony Music Studios (NYC) and The Record Plant (Hollywood, CA)
- Mixed at Encore Studios (Los Angeles, CA) and Chung King Studios (NYC)

Personnel

- Kanye West – songwriter, production
- Toomp – songwriter, production
- Faheem Najm – songwriter
- James Ingram – songwriter
- Quincy Jones – songwriter
- Mike Dean – additional production, mix engineer
- Timbaland – additional drum programming
- Andrew Dawson – recording, mix engineer
- Anthony Kilhoffer – recording
- Paul Sheehy – recording
- Bram Tobey – assistant mix engineer
- Jason Agel – assistant mix engineer
- Nate Hertweck – assistant mix engineer
- Anthony Palazzole – assistant mix engineer
- Andy Marcinkowski – assistant mix engineer
- Omar Edwards – piano, synths
- Eric Gorfain – violin
- Daphne Chen – violin
- Leah Katz – viola
- Alma Fernadez – viola
- Richard Dodd – cello
- John Krovoza – cello
- John Legend – background vocals
- Ne-Yo – background vocals
- Dayna Staggs – international songwriter, producer, and vocalist Volume of the Goodlife GMBH sample

== Charts ==
=== Weekly charts ===
Chart performance for "Good Life"
Chart (2007–2008)	Peak position
Australia (ARIA)	21
Belgium (Ultratip Bubbling Under Flanders)	18
Belgium (Ultratip Bubbling Under Wallonia)	22
Canada Hot 100 (Billboard)	23
Finland (Suomen virallinen lista)	20
Germany (GfK)	78
Ireland (IRMA)	24
New Zealand (Recorded Music NZ)	11
Romania (Romanian Top 100)	96
Russia (Tophit)	345
Slovakia Airplay (ČNS IFPI)	79
UK Singles (Official Charts)	23
US Billboard Hot 100	7
US Adult R&B Songs (Billboard)	40
US Hot R&B/Hip-Hop Songs (Billboard)	3
US Hot Rap Songs (Billboard)	1
US Pop Airplay (Billboard)	18
US Pop 100 (Billboard)	18
US Rhythmic Airplay (Billboard)	3

=== Year-end charts ===
2007 year-end chart performance for "Good Life"
Chart (2007)	Position
Australia Urban (ARIA)	37
UK Singles (OCC)	147
US Hot R&B/Hip-Hop Songs (Billboard)	69

2008 year-end chart performance for "Good Life"
Chart (2008)	Position
Australia Urban (ARIA)	39
US Billboard Hot 100	79
US Hot R&B/Hip-Hop Songs (Billboard)	38
US Hot Rap Songs (Billboard)	11

== Certifications ==
Certifications for "Good Life"
Region	Certification	Certified units/sales
Denmark (IFPI Danmark)	Gold	45,000^{‡}
New Zealand (RMNZ)	2× Platinum	60,000^{‡}
United Kingdom (BPI)	Platinum	600,000^{‡}
United States (RIAA)	4× Platinum	4,000,000^{‡}
United States (RIAA) Mastertone	Platinum	1,000,000^{*}
^{*} Sales figures based on certification alone.^{‡} Sales+streaming figures based on certification alone.

== Release history ==
Release dates and formats for "Good Life"
Region	Date	Format	Label(s)	Ref.
United States	October 2, 2007	Rhythmic contemporary radio	Roc A Fella; Def Jam	
United Kingdom	October 2, 2007	Digital download	Roc A Fella; Def Jam	
United Kingdom	November 5, 2007	CD single	Mercury	
Australia	November 5, 2007	CD Maxi	Roc A Fella; Def Jam	
United States	November 6, 2007	CD single	Roc A Fella; Def Jam	

== See also ==
- List of Billboard Hot 100 top-ten singles in 2007
