= Reema Major =

- Born: June 26, 1995 (age 29); Khartoum, Sudan
- Genres: Hip hop
- Occupation(s): Rapper, songwriter
- Years active: 2009 – present
- Labels: G7 Records; Universal Music Canada; Cherrytree; Interscope
- Website: www.reemamajor.com

Reema Major (born June 26, 1995) is a Sudanese-Canadian rapper. She is signed to a joint-record label venture with G7 Records, Universal Music Canada, Cherrytree Records and Interscope Records.

== Early life ==
Reema Major was born in Khartoum, Sudan, to a South Sudanese mother and an Emirati father. Her mother moved to Kenya, and later to Uganda, before settling in Canada in 1998, through the United Nations refugee program. In Canada, Major was introduced to hip hop at the age of five by her cousin, who participated in cyphers outside of their apartment building.

Major's upbringing was strongly influenced by an early passion for emceeing and writing. Fluent in English and Arabic, she channeled her experiences and cultural influences towards honing her musical craft as a rapper and songwriter—something she expressed as coming naturally to her.

== Career ==
In 2009, Major was introduced to the president and CEO of G7 Records, Kwajo Cinqo, a member of the Canadian hip hop group Ghetto Concept, from Toronto's Rexdale neighborhood. In 2010, a joint-venture record deal was made with G7/Universal/Interscope. This was the first time Universal Music Group signed a direct deal with a Canadian urban music label. Major premiered at the 2010 BET Hip Hop Awards alongside emcees Nick Javas and Laws. Major is the youngest Canadian female rapper to perform at the BET Hip Hop Awards. That same year, Major was also featured on Royalty Radio 91.9 FM.

On October 7, 2011, G7 Music Publishing signed a co-publishing deal with Universal Music Publishing Group for the services of Major. The deal was spearheaded by Evan Lamberg who was the President of Universal Music Publishing Group North America.

Major's first mixtape Youngest In Charge was released in 2009. Following that, 15 Going on 25 was released in October 2010, and I Am Legend on May 27, 2011. The rapper has performed with Wiz Khalifa, Mac Miller, and Big Boi of Outkast. Major also collaborated with well-known names such as Bangladesh, DJ Toomp, The Stereotypes, and rappers Kwajo Cinqo of Ghetto Concept and Rick Ross. In September 2011 she opened for Wiz Khalifa's two-time sold-out Rolling Papers World Tour show in Toronto. During that time she also released her single "I'm The One" from her I Am Legend mixtape on October 12, 2011, with cameos shot in Miami, Florida alongside Rick Ross.

In 2013, she collaborated with Karl Wolf and was featured in his single "Go Your Own Way".That same year her song "Gucci Bag" was featured in the motion picture film The Bling Ring.

On April 21, 2017, Major released the first single "AK47" from her upcoming album called LegenDIARY..

== Discography ==
=== Albums and mixtapes ===
- Youngest In Charge (2009)
- 15 Going on 25 (2010)
- I Am Legend (2011)
- #IDGAF (2013)

=== Singles ===
- 2011: "I'm The One"
- 2017: "AK47"

=== Guest Appearances ===
- 2013: "Go Your Own Way" (Karl Wolf featuring Reema Major)

== See also ==
- G7 Records
- Interscope Records
- Cherrytree Records
- Brick Squad Monopoly
