= BET Hip Hop Awards =

Annual hip hop music awards

- Current: 2024 BET Hip Hop Awards
- Awarded for: Outstanding achievements in hip-hop
- Country: United States
- Presented by: BET
- First award: November 12, 2006; 20 years ago
- Final award: October 8, 2024; 2 years ago
- Website: http://www.bet.com

The BET Hip Hop Awards were an annual awards show, airing on BET, showcasing hip-hop performers, producers and music video directors. The awards ceremony began in 2006; it was held on November 12, 2006 at the Fox Theatre in Atlanta and was first aired November 15, hosted by comedian Katt Williams. Choreography Dee DeeLo Davis (DeeLo from the 864)

The second ceremony was held on October 13, 2007 and aired on October 17 of the same year. Like its predecessor, the ceremony was also held at the Fox Theater in Atlanta, and was hosted by Katt Williams. The third ceremony premiered on October 23, 2008. This ceremony was hosted by popular R&B and hip-hop artist T-Pain. The fourth ceremony was held on October 10, 2009 and was hosted by Mike Epps and aired on October 27. The fifth ceremony was held on October 2, 2010 (aired October 12) and was also by hosted Mike Epps. Epps hosted two additional years (2011 & 2012), and Snoop Dogg hosted in 2013, 2014, and 2015. The final ceremony was held on October 8, 2024 and was hosted by Fat Joe.

In 2025, it was announced that BET Hip Hop Awards, alongside the Soul Train Music Awards, were suspended.

== Ceremony ==
| Year | Air date | Venue | Host | I Am Hip Hop award | Cultural Influence Award |
| 2006 | November 15 | Fox Theatre | Katt Williams | Grandmaster Flash | —N/a |
| 2007 | October 17 | Atlanta Civic Center | Katt Williams | KRS-One | —N/a |
| 2008 | October 23 | Atlanta Civic Center | T-Pain | Russell Simmons | —N/a |
| 2009 | October 27 | Atlanta Civic Center | Mike Epps | Ice Cube | —N/a |
| 2010 | October 12 | Atlanta Civic Center | Mike Epps | Salt-N-Pepa | —N/a |
| 2011 | October 11 | Atlanta Civic Center | Mike Epps | LL Cool J | —N/a |
| 2012 | October 9 | Atlanta Civic Center | Mike Epps | Rakim | —N/a |
| 2013 | October 15 | Atlanta Civic Center | Snoop Dogg | MC Lyte | —N/a |
| 2014 | October 14 | Atlanta Civic Center | Snoop Dogg | Doug E. Fresh | —N/a |
| 2015 | October 13 | Atlanta Civic Center | Snoop Dogg | Scarface | —N/a |
| 2016 | October 4 | Cobb Energy Performing Arts Centre | DJ Khaled | Snoop Dogg | —N/a |
| 2017 | October 10 | Miami Beach Convention Center | DJ Khaled | Luther Campbell | —N/a |
| 2018 | October 16 | Miami Beach Convention Center | DeRay Davis | Lil Wayne | —N/a |
| 2019 | October 9 | Cobb Energy Performing Arts Centre | Lil Duval | Lil' Kim | —N/a |
| 2020 | October 27 | Multiple locations | Karlous Miller, DC Young Fly, and Chico Bean | Master P | —N/a |
| 2021 | October 5 | Cobb Energy Performing Arts Centre | Karlous Miller, DC Young Fly, and Chico Bean | Nelly | Tyler, the Creator |
| 2022 | October 4 | Cobb Energy Performing Arts Centre | Fat Joe | Trina | —N/a |
| 2023 | October 3 | Cobb Energy Performing Arts Centre | Fat Joe | Marley Marl | Swizz Beatz and Timbaland |
| 2024 | October 15 | Las Vegas | Fat Joe | Travis Scott | —N/a |

== Most wins ==
- Kendrick Lamar — 37 wins
- Jay-Z — 25 wins
- Drake — 24 wins
- Kanye West – 19 wins
- Lil Wayne — 16 wins
- Cardi B — 14 wins

== Category ==
Current Award

- DJ of the Year – (award given 2007~present)
- Hustler of the Year – (award given 2006~present)
- Lyricist of the Year – (award given 2006~present)
- MVP of the Year – (award given 2006~present)
- Producer of the Year – (award given 2006~present)
- Best Live Performer – (award given 2006~present and formerly known as Hot Ticket Performer)
- Video Director of the Year – (award given 2006~present)
- Best New Hip Hop Artist – (award given 2006~present and formerly known as Rookie of the Year or Who Blew Up Award)
- Made-You-Look Award (Best Hip Hop Style) – (award given 2009~present)
- Album of the Year – (award given 2006~present and formerly known as CD of the Year)
- Single of the Year – (award given 2006~present and formerly known as Track of the Year)
- Best Collaboration, Duo or Group – (award given 2006~present and formerly known as Perfect Combo Award)
- Best Hip Hop Video – (award given 2006~present)
- Best Mixtape – (award given 2011~present)
- Sweet 16: Best Featured Verse – (award given 2011~present)
- Impact Track – (award given 2012~present)

Defunct Award

- Best Club Banger of the year – (award given 2010~2015)
- Best Online Site – (award given 2009~2014)
- People's Champ Award – (award given 2006~2016)
- Best Ringtone – (award given 2006~2008)
- Best UK Hip Hop Act – (award given 2006~2008)
- Best Movie – (award given 2006~2007)
- Best Dance – (award given 2006~2007)

=== Special awards ===
- I Am Hip Hop award: a lifetime achievement "to one emcee whose career has set an example of what it means to be hip hop".
- Cultural Influence Award: to an "innovative, otherworldly artist that has significantly impacted the culture, while uplifting their community"
