= 2009 BET Hip Hop Awards =

Annual edition for the awards show

- Date: October 10, 2009
- Location: The Atlanta Civic Center
- Hosted by: Mike Epps

Television/radio coverage
- Network: BET

The 2009 BET Hip Hop Awards are a recognition ceremony held on October 10, 2009, at the Atlanta Civic Center in Atlanta, Georgia. The 2009 show was hosted by Mike Epps.

Kanye West led the BET Hip-Hop Awards 2009 with nine nominations, followed by Jay-Z and Lil Wayne with seven and T.I. with six nominations.

The rapper and music producer Ice Cube received the I Am Hip-Hop Award, for his role in pioneering the West Coast rap movement in the late 1980s. Jay-Z was the most awarded artist of the ceremony, with four awards, including Hustler of the Year. Although he was in Arkansas Penitentiary on a federal gun charge, T.I. won three awards, two of which Rihanna's collaboration "Live Your Life". Kanye West was awarded as Producer of the Year.

== Performances ==
- "Pretty Girls" – Wale feat Gucci Mane
- "I'm Ballin'"/"Gucci Bandanna" – Soulja Boy feat Gucci Mane and Shawty Lo
- "Addicted To Money" / "How Low" – Ludacris feat Lil Scrappy
- "Real as It Gets" – Jay-Z feat Young Jeezy
- "Ice Cream Paint Job (Remix)" – Dorrough Ft. Nipsey Hussle, Jim Jones, Soulja Boy Tell 'Em & Snoop Dogg
- "Throw It in the Bag" / "Throw It In The Bag (Remix)" – Fabolous feat The-Dream
- "Gangsta Luv"/"Gin & Juice" – Snoop Dogg feat The-Dream
- "Break Up"/"Wasted" – Gucci Mane feat Mario & Plies
- "Cell Therapy"/"Get Rich to This" – Goodie Mob

=== Cyphers ===
- Cypher 1 – Nicki Minaj, Buckshot, Crown Royyal, & Joe Budden
- Cypher 2 – Wale, Nipsey Hussle, Gsan, & KRS-One
- Cypher 3 – Mos Def, Black Thought, & Eminem

== Winners and nominations ==
=== Best Hip Hop Video ===
T.I. featuring Rihanna – "Live Your Life"

- Dorrough – "Ice Cream Paint Job"
- Eminem – "We Made You"
- Jay-Z – "D.O.A. (Death of Auto-Tune)"
- Kid Cudi – "Day 'n' Nite"

=== Best Hip Hop Collaboration ===
T.I. featuring Rihanna – "Live Your Life"

- Jim Jones and Ron Browz featuring Juelz Santana – "Pop Champagne"
- Lil Wayne featuring Bobby Valentino – "Mrs. Officer"
- Rick Ross featuring John Legend – "Magnificent"
- Young Jeezy featuring Kanye West – "Put On"

=== Best Live Performer ===
Jay-Z

- Busta Rhymes
- Lil Wayne
- T.I.
- Kanye West

=== Lyricist of the Year ===
Jay-Z

- Drake
- Eminem
- Lil Wayne
- Kanye West

=== Video Director of the Year ===
Hype Williams

- Gil Green
- Anthony Mandler
- Mr. Boomtown
- Chris Robinson

=== Producer of the Year ===
Kanye West

- Ron Browz
- Cool & Dre
- Tha Bizness
- T-Pain

=== MVP of the Year ===
Jay-Z

- Drake
- Lil Wayne
- T.I.
- Kanye West

=== Track of the Year ===
Only the producer of the track nominated in this category.

"Every Girl" – Produced by Tha Bizness (Young Money)

- "Day 'n' Nite" – Produced by Dot da Genius and Kid Cudi (Kid Cudi)
- "D.O.A. (Death of Auto-Tune)" – Produced by No I.D. (Jay-Z)
- "Live Your Life" – Produced by Just Blaze (T.I. featuring Rihanna )
- "Turn My Swag On" – Produced by Natural Disaster and Top Cat (Soulja Boy Tell’em)

=== CD of the Year ===
T.I. – Paper Trail

- Eminem – Relapse
- Q-Tip – The Renaissance
- Kanye West – 808s & Heartbreak
- Young Jeezy – The Recession

=== DJ of the Year ===
DJ AM

- DJ Drama
- DJ Khaled
- DJ Tony Neal
- DJ Greg Street

=== Rookie of the Year ===
Drake

- B.o.B
- Dorrough
- Kid Cudi
- Wale

=== Made-You-Look Award (Best Hip-Hop Style) ===
Kanye West

- Jay-Z
- Kid Cudi
- Lil Wayne
- Soulja Boy Tell’em

=== Hustler of the Year ===
Jay-Z

- Diddy
- Drake
- Lil Wayne
- Kanye West

=== Verizon People's Champ Award ===
Fabolous featuring The-Dream – "Throw It in the Bag"

- Dorrough – "Ice Cream Paint Job"
- Kid Cudi – "Day 'n' Nite"
- Soulja Boy Tell’em – "Turn My Swag On"
- Kanye West featuring Young Jeezy – "Amazing"

=== Best Hip Hop Blog Site ===
All Hip Hop

- Nah Right
- SOHH
- This Is 50
- World Star Hip Hop

=== I Am Hip Hop ===
Ice Cube
