= 2008 BET Hip Hop Awards =

Annual edition for the awards show

- Date: October 23, 2008
- Location: The Atlanta Civic Center
- Hosted by: T-Pain

Television/radio coverage
- Network: BET

The 2008 show was hosted by T-Pain.

== Performances ==
- "What Up, What's Haapnin'"/"Swing Ya Rag"/"The Last of a Dying Breed"/"On Top of the World" - T.I. Feat.Ludacris, Swizz Beatz & B.o.B
- "Hero" - Nas Feat. Keri Hilson
- "Bust It Baby Pt. 2" - Plies Feat. Ne-Yo
- "Crazy World" - Young Jeezy
- "Cha Cha Cha" - MC Lyte
- "Play With My Yoyo" - Yo-Yo
- "Afro Puffs" - The Lady of Rage
- "Shoop"/"Push It"/"Whatta Man" - Salt-n-Pepa
- "Here I Am" - Rick Ross Feat. Nelly & Avery Storm
- "Universal Mind Control"/"Spaz" - Common featuring N.E.R.D
- "Can't Believe It"/"Chopped & Skrewed" - T-Pain Feat. Lil Wayne & Ludacris
- "Why Me"/"It Was a Good Day" - Ice Cube Feat. Musiq Soulchild
- "Marco Polo (song)" - Bow Wow Feat. Soulja Boy

== Cyphers ==
- Cypher 1 - Hurricane Chris, K'naan, Bun B, & Q-Tip
- Cypher 2 - Willy Northpole, Hime, Blaq Poet, & Cory Gunz
- Cypher 3 - Ace Hood, Juelz Santana, Fabolous, & Jadakiss

== Winners and nominations ==
=== Best Hip Hop Video ===
Kanye West featuring T-Pain – "Good Life"

- David Banner featuring Chris Brown and Yung Joc – "Get Like Me"
- Common – "I Want You"
- DJ Khaled featuring Young Jeezy, Ludacris, Busta Rhymes, Big Boi, Lil Wayne, Fat Joe, Birdman and Rick Ross – "I'm So Hood (Remix)"
- Lil Wayne featuring Static Major – "Lollipop"
- Snoop Dogg – "Sensual Seduction"

=== Best Hip Hop Collaboration ===
DJ Khaled featuring Young Jeezy, Ludacris, Busta Rhymes, Big Boi, Lil Wayne, Fat Joe, Birdman and Rick Ross – "I'm So Hood (Remix)"

- David Banner featuring Chris Brown and Yung Joc – "Get Like Me"
- Flo Rida featuring T-Pain – "Low"
- Plies featuring Ne-Yo – "Bust It Baby Pt. 2"
- Kanye West featuring T-Pain – "Good Life"

=== Best Live Performer ===
Kanye West

- Busta Rhymes
- Jay-Z
- Lil Wayne
- T.I.

=== Lyricist of the Year ===
Lil Wayne

- Jay-Z
- Nas
- T.I.
- Kanye West

=== Video Director of the Year ===
Chris Robinson

- Gil Green
- R. Malcolm Jones
- Rage
- Hype Williams

=== Producer of the Year ===
Akon

- Bangladesh
- David Banner
- J.R. Rotem
- The Runners

=== MVP of the Year ===
Lil Wayne

- DJ Khaled
- Jay-Z
- T.I.
- Kanye West

=== Track of the Year ===
?

- "A Milli" – Produced by Bangladesh (Lil Wayne)
- "Dey Know" – Produced by Balis Beatz (Shawty Lo)
- "Good Life" – Produced by Kanye West and DJ Toomp (Kanye West featuring T-Pain)
- "Lollipop" – Produced by Jim Jonsin and Deezle (Lil Wayne featuring Static Major)
- "Roc Boys (And the Winner Is)..." – Produced by Sean Combs and The Hitmen (Jay-Z)

=== CD of the Year ===
Lil Wayne – Tha Carter III

- Jay-Z – American Gangster
- Lupe Fiasco – Lupe Fiasco's The Cool
- Nas – Untitled
- Kanye West – Graduation

=== Who New? Rookie of the Year ===
Shawty Lo

- Ace Hood
- Flo Rida
- Maino
- Rocko

=== DJ of the Year ===
DJ Khaled

- DJ Drama
- DJ Felli Fel
- DJ Tony Neal
- DJ Greg Street

=== Hustler of the Year ===
P. Diddy

- 50 Cent
- DJ Khaled
- Jay-Z
- Lil Wayne

=== Alltel Wireless People’s Champ Award ===
Lil Wayne – "A Milli"

- Lupe Fiasco featuring Matthew Santos – "Superstar"
- Plies featuring Ne-Yo – "Bust It Baby Pt. 2"
- Rick Ross featuring Nelly and Avery Storm – "Here I Am"
- Young Jeezy featuring Kanye West – "Put On"
- Yung Berg featuring Casha – "The Business"

=== Hottest Hip Hop Ringtone of the Year ===
Lil Wayne featuring Static Major – "Lollipop"

- Flo Rida featuring T-Pain – "Low"
- Plies featuring Ne-Yo – "Bust It Baby Pt. 2"
- Rocko – "Umma Do Me"
- Yung Berg featuring Casha – "The Business"

=== Best UK Hip Hop Act ===
Giggs

- Chipmunk
- Dizzee Rascal
- Ghetto
- Skepta
- Wiley

=== I Am Hip-Hop ===
Russell Simmons
