= 2010 BET Hip Hop Awards =

Annual edition for the awards show

- Date: October 12, 2010
- Hosted by: Mike Epps

Television/radio coverage
- Network: BET

The 2010 show was hosted by Mike Epps. DJ Khaled was the host DJ and DJ Premier DJed the cyphers.

== Performances ==
- "B.M.F. (Blowin' Money Fast)"/"MC Hammer" - Rick Ross with Diddy and DJ Khaled
- "Too Legit to Quit" - MC Hammer
- "Speakers Going Hammer"/"Pretty Boy Swag" - Soulja Boy
- "Hard in da Paint"/"No Hands" - Waka Flocka Flame feat. Roscoe Dash
- "Bed Intruder Song" - Antoine Dodson & Michael Gregory of The Gregory Brothers
- "Gucci Time" - Gucci Mane feat. Swizz Beatz
- "You Aint No DJ" - Big Boi feat. Yelawolf
- "Who Dat"/"Blow Up" - J. Cole
- "Salute" - Dipset
- "Don't Let Me Fall" - B.o.B
- "Teach Me How to Dougie" - Cali Swag District
- "The Humpty Dance"/"I Get Around" - Shock G & Money-B of Digital Underground

== Cyphers ==
- Internet Exclusive Cypher 1 - Vado, Reychesta, & Farnsworth Bentley
- Internet Exclusive Cypher 2 - Laws, Reema Major, & Nick Javas
- Cypher 1 - Wiz Khalifa, Bones Brigante, Yelawolf, & Raekwon
- Cypher 2 - Tyga, Kuniva, Diamond, & Royce Da 5'9"
- Cypher 3 - Ice Cube with his sons Doughboy & OMG and Rev Run with his sons Diggy & Jo-Jo
- Cypher 4 - Reek Da Villain, Zawcain, & Mickey Factz
- Cypher 5 - Pusha T, Big Sean, CyHi Da Prynce, Common, & Kanye West of G.O.O.D. Music
- Ghana Exclusive Cypher - D-Black Da Ghana Bwouy, Sarkodie, Kwaku-T, Ayigbe Edem, Babyg, Tinny, & Reggie Rockstone

== Winners and nominations ==
=== Best Hip Hop Video ===
Jay-Z & Alicia Keys – "Empire State of Mind"

- B.o.B featuring Bruno Mars – "Nothin' on You"
- Drake – "Find Your Love"
- Jay-Z featuring Rihanna & Kanye West – "Run This Town"
- Jay-Z featuring Swizz Beatz – "On to the Next One"

=== Reese’s Perfect Combo Award ===
Jay-Z & Alicia Keys – "Empire State of Mind"

- B.o.B featuring Bruno Mars – "Nothin' on You"
- Diddy-Dirty Money featuring Rick Ross & Nicki Minaj – "Hello Good Morning (Remix)"
- DJ Khaled featuring Rick Ross, T-Pain, Busta Rhymes, P. Diddy, Fabolous, Fat Joe, Jadakiss & Nicki Minaj – "All I Do Is Win (Remix)"
- Drake featuring Lil Wayne, Kanye West & Eminem – "Forever"

=== Best Live Performer ===
Jay-Z

- Busta Rhymes
- Drake
- Kanye West
- Lil Wayne

=== Lyricist of the Year ===
Eminem

- Drake
- Lil Wayne
- Nicki Minaj
- Jay-Z

=== Video Director of the Year ===
Hype Williams

- Benny Boom
- Chris Robinson
- Gil Green
- Mr. Boomtown

=== Producer of the Year ===
Swizz Beatz

- Boi-1da
- Drumma Boy
- Lex Luger
- Polow Da Don

=== MVP of the Year ===
Drake

- B.o.B
- Eminem
- Jay-Z
- Rick Ross

=== Track of the Year ===
Only the producer of the track nominated in this category.

"BMF" – Produced by Lex Luger (Rick Ross featuring Styles P)

- "Airplanes" – Produced by Alex da Kid & DJ Frank E (B.o.B featuring Hayley Williams)
- "All I Do Is Win" – Produced by DJ Nasty & LVM (DJ Khaled featuring T-Pain, Ludacris, Rick Ross & Snoop Dogg)
- "BedRock" – Produced by Kane Beatz (Young Money featuring Lloyd)
- "Empire State of Mind" – Produced by Alexander Shuckburgh (Jay-Z & Alicia Keys)

=== CD of the Year ===
Jay-Z – The Blueprint 3

- B.o.B – B.o.B Presents: The Adventures of Bobby Ray
- Eminem – Recovery
- Drake – Thank Me Later
- Rick Ross – Teflon Don

=== DJ of the Year ===
DJ Khaled

- DJ Drama
- Funkmaster Flex
- DJ Holliday
- Dj Tony Neal

=== Rookie of the Year ===
Nicki Minaj

- Chiddy Bang
- J. Cole
- Roscoe Dash
- Waka Flocka Flame

=== Made-You-Look Award (Best Hip-Hop Style) ===
Nicki Minaj

- B.o.B
- Jay-Z
- T.I.
- Kanye West

=== Best Club Banger ===
Rick Ross featuring Styles P – "BMF" (Produced by Lex Luger)

- Diddy-Dirty Money featuring T.I. & Rick Ross – "Hello Good Morning" (Produced by Danja)
- DJ Khaled featuring T-Pain, Ludacris, Rick Ross & Snoop Dogg – "All I Do Is Win" (Produced by DJ Nasty & LVM)
- Young Jeezy featuring Plies – "Lose My Mind" (Produced by Drumma Boy)
- Waka Flocka Flame – "O Let's Do It" (Produced by L-Don Beatz)

=== Hustler of the Year ===
Diddy

- Drake
- Jay-Z
- Nicki Minaj
- T.I.

=== Verizon People’s Champ Award ===
Nicki Minaj – "Your Love"

- B.o.B featuring Bruno Mars – "Nothin' on You"
- Eminem – "Not Afraid"
- Gucci Mane – "Lemonade"
- Cali Swag District – "Teach Me How to Dougie"
- Drake – "Over"

=== Best Hip Hop Blog Site ===
WorldStarHipHop.com

- AllHipHop.com
- NahRight.com
- RapRadar.com
- ThisIs50.com

=== I Am Hip Hop ===
Salt-N-Pepa
