= 2006 BET Hip Hop Awards =

First edition of the awards show

- Date: November 12, 2006
- Location: Fox Theatre
- Hosted by: Katt Williams

Television/radio coverage
- Network: BET

The first BET show in 2006 was hosted by Katt Williams in Atlanta. Choreography DeeLo (from the 864)

== Performances ==
- "Welcome to Atlanta" (Remix) – Jermaine Dupri feat. Ludacris, Young Jeezy and Lil Jon
- "That's That" – Snoop Dogg
- "Stuntin' Like My Daddy" – Birdman and Lil Wayne
- "Push It" / "Hustlin'" – Rick Ross
- "Grew Up a Screw Up" – Ludacris feat. Young Jeezy
- "One Blood" / "Let's Ride" – The Game feat. Junior Reid
- "Top Back" (Remix) – T.I. feat. Young Dro, Big Kuntry King and B.G.
- "I Luv It" – Young Jeezy
- "We Fly High" – Jim Jones feat. Juelz Santana
- "Walk It Out" – Unk
- Cypher 1 – Papoose, Lupe Fiasco and Styles P
- Cypher 2 – Remy Ma, Saigon, Sway DaSafo and Rhymefest, with DJ Scratch

== Winners and nominations ==
- Hip Hop Video of the Year: "What You Know" – T.I.
- Element Award: Video Director of the Year: Hype Williams
- Hip Hop Track of the Year: "It's Goin' Down" – Yung Joc feat. Nitti
- Rookie of the Year: Chamillionaire
- Element Award: Producer of the Year: Jermaine Dupri
- Hip Hop MVP of the Year: T.I.
- Element Award – Lyricist of the Year: Common
- Element Award – Best Hip Hop Dance of the Year: Snap
- Best Hip Hop Movie: ATL
- Best Live Performance: Busta Rhymes
- Move the Crowd Award: Busta Rhymes
- Hip Hop CD of the Year: King – T.I.
- Hip Hop Hustler Award: Jay-Z
- Alltel Wireless People's Champ Award: "Ridin'" – Chamillionaire feat. Krayzie Bone
- Best UK Hip Hop Act (BET International): Sway DaSafo
- BET Hot Ringtone Award: "Shoulder Lean" – Young Dro feat. T.I.
- Best Collaboration: "Touch It" (Remix) – Busta Rhymes featuring Mary J. Blige, Rah Digga, Missy Elliott, Lloyd Banks, Papoose & DMX
- I Am Hip-Hop Icon Award: Grandmaster Flash
