= The Documentary =

Studio album by the Game
- Released: January 18, 2005
- Studios: Record One (Sherman Oaks, Los Angeles); Can-Am Studios (Tarzana, Los Angeles); The Record Room and Hit Factory Criteria (Miami, Florida); Baseline (New York City); TekLab Studios (Cincinnati, Ohio); 54 Sound (Detroit); Larrabee Sound (North Hollywood, Los Angeles)
- Genres: West Coast hip-hop; gangsta rap; R&B; conscious hip-hop
- Length: 69:57
- Labels: Interscope; G-Unit; Aftermath; Czar
- Producers: 50 Cent (exec.); Dr. Dre (also exec.); Buckwild; Che Vicious; Cool & Dre; Danja; Eminem; Focus...; Havoc; Hi-Tek; Jeff Bhasker; Jeff Reed; Just Blaze; Kanye West; Luis Resto; Mark Batson; Mike Elizondo; Needlz; Scott Storch; Timbaland

The Game chronology
Untold Story (2004)	The Documentary (2005)	Doctor's Advocate (2006)

Alternate cover
- Special edition cover

Singles from The Documentary
- 1. "Westside Story" Released: September 7, 2004; 2. "How We Do" Released: October 30, 2004; 3. "Hate It or Love It" Released: January 22, 2005; 4. "Higher" Released: March 15, 2005; 5. "Dreams" Released: May 28, 2005; 6. "Put You on the Game" Released: August 30, 2005

The Documentary is the commercial debut studio album by American rapper the Game. It was released on January 18, 2005, by Interscope Records, Dr. Dre's Aftermath Entertainment and 50 Cent's G-Unit Records. The record serves as his major-label debut, preceded by his independently released debut Untold Story in 2004. In 2001, while the Game was in hospital recovering from a shooting, he decided to pursue a career in music. He released the mixtape, "Q.B. 2 Compton" under his then record label "Get Low Recordz" in 2002, which was later discovered by Dr. Dre and led to him signing the Game to his label, Aftermath Entertainment. The album includes production from high-profile producers such as Dr. Dre, Kanye West, Scott Storch and Timbaland, among others, and guest appearances from 50 Cent, Eminem, Nate Dogg and Faith Evans, among others. This would be the Game's only album on all three labels, as he left them later in 2006 after a feud began between him and fellow G-Unit label-mate 50 Cent.

The Documentary debuted at number one on the US Billboard 200, selling 586,000 units in its first week. In March 2005, the Recording Industry Association of America certified the album double Platinum, and by November 2005 the album sold 2.5 million copies in the U.S. The Documentary received generally positive reviews, with critics praising the album's production. It is also often debated by critics between itself and Doctor's Advocate as Game's best album. Since the album's release, the Game was credited as a "driving force" in reviving the once-dominant West Coast hip-hop scene that had since been overshadowed by artists from the East, Midwest and South during the early 2000s. The Documentary remains the Game's best-selling album to date. On June 16, 2014, the Game announced a sequel to the album, The Documentary 2, which was released on October 9, 2015, followed by the release of The Documentary 2.5 a week later. Another sequel, The Documentary III, was then released on August 21, 2026.

== Recording ==
After the Game signed with G-Unit, he recorded nine songs with fellow American rapper 50 Cent in his home studio in Farmington, Connecticut, and then went back to Los Angeles, California to complete the album with American record producer Dr. Dre. While continuing the recording sessions on the album, he began working with rapper and record producer Kanye West on a song, where Kanye did the chorus. However, the song was left on the cutting room floor. The Game was also motivated to revive the West Coast hip hop scene, which had been overshadowed since its heyday in the 1990s by rappers from the East, Midwest and the South. In 2005, in the interview with Vibe magazine, 50 Cent stated that he was brought in by the Interscope Records to work on the album, claiming that it was on the verge of being shelved and the Game was being dropped from the label. However, in the interview with Funkmaster Flex, the Game said that his status was never uncertain that he would be dropped from the label. 50 Cent also wrote 6 choruses of The Documentary's eighteen tracks—"Hate It or Love It", "How We Do", "Church for Thugs", "Special", "Higher", and "Westside Story"—and didn't receive proper credit for his work.

According to Aftermath A&R Mike Lynn, an early version of the album was rejected as the music was deemed unsatisfactory; "Dreams" was the only song from this iteration that made it into the album's revised retail release. Both Lynn and Dr. Dre claimed that the track "Dreams" alone proved to them that The Game was capable of putting together a quality record.

== Music ==
=== Lyrics ===
The Game for the album recorded tracks based on his life experiences from his childhood to his success as a rapper. When asked about the album, he stated:

I grew up in a boys home and I was taken away from my parents when I was like 8 years old... Here I am, 24. When my album drops I will be 25 so that's 17 years I have been going through my struggle by myself. There are 17 tracks on my album and every track sheds light on a different situation I went through the last 17 years.

The rapper commented on the album's perception before its release, saying, "I know everybody was expecting gang-bang, 40-ounce, low-rider music, but that's not what I gave them... I'm telling a real story, and maybe there are people out there who can relate to my experiences." Rolling Stone observed that "every song has a well-massaged hook and some immediate appeal, and verses that don't waste a lot of time getting to the point."

=== Production ===
The Documentary's big budget production from high-profile hip-hop producers was well received from critics. The first half of the album contains "upbeat, gangsta boogie" tracks with the other half relegating "smoothed out R&B maneuvers". At seven tracks, Dr. Dre co-executive produced the album with his "stripped-down cinematic" approach. "Westside Story" contains an "evil sounding piano plink", "Dreams" has a "simultaneously smooth and eerie" beat, and "Hate It or Love It" unveils a "smoothed out R&B funk vibe". "Higher" revolves around a pounding synth blast and "How We Do" contains syncopated hand claps with a beat described as "a hypnotic blast of sinister seduction powered by a deliciously primitive 808 pattern and a slinky synth." "Don't Need Your Love" samples Mary J. Blige's "Not Gon Cry" and is one of the album's more soulful songs. "Church for Thugs" delivers a "sing-song stylee over an accentuated sonic bed" and "Put You on the Game" is a club track containing "dark dirge[s] of synth".

Although "Start from Scratch" features R&B singer Marsha Ambrosius, the beat "eschews the traditional R&B vibes" for more "aural intimidation". IGN called it "the most haunting inclusion on the album." "The Documentary" features a "busy backing track" of "crashing symphonics and tinny flares of synth", which one critic believed overshadowed the lyrics. "Runnin'" is a "dark, Stygian tune augmented by tinges of R&B mellowness." "No More Fun and Games" has a fast-paced beat that takes inspiration from early 1990s production. "We Ain't", which samples Dr. Dre's "The Watcher", takes Eminem's "chug laden synth gurgle" and is described as "one of the most menacingly catchy numbers on the entire album." Nate Dogg features on two "smoothed out" tracks; "Special" and the G-funk-inspired "Where I'm From". "Don't Worry" is an R&B flavored track and despite its "minimal production", one reviewer wrote the song "still hits hard." The final track, "Like Father, Like Son", is driven by a "melodramatic, string-laden" beat. Originally, Brandy Norwood was supposed to be on "Don't Worry", but Jimmy Iovine did not want a gangsta rapper like the Game on a song with Brandy.

=== Title ===
The album's title was initially called "Nigga Witta Attitude Vol. 1" (a reference to N.W.A), but was changed to "The Documentary" because legal issues with an injunction filed at the request of Eazy-E's widow Tomica Woods-Wright prevented him from using N.W.A's name in the album title.

== Release and promotion ==
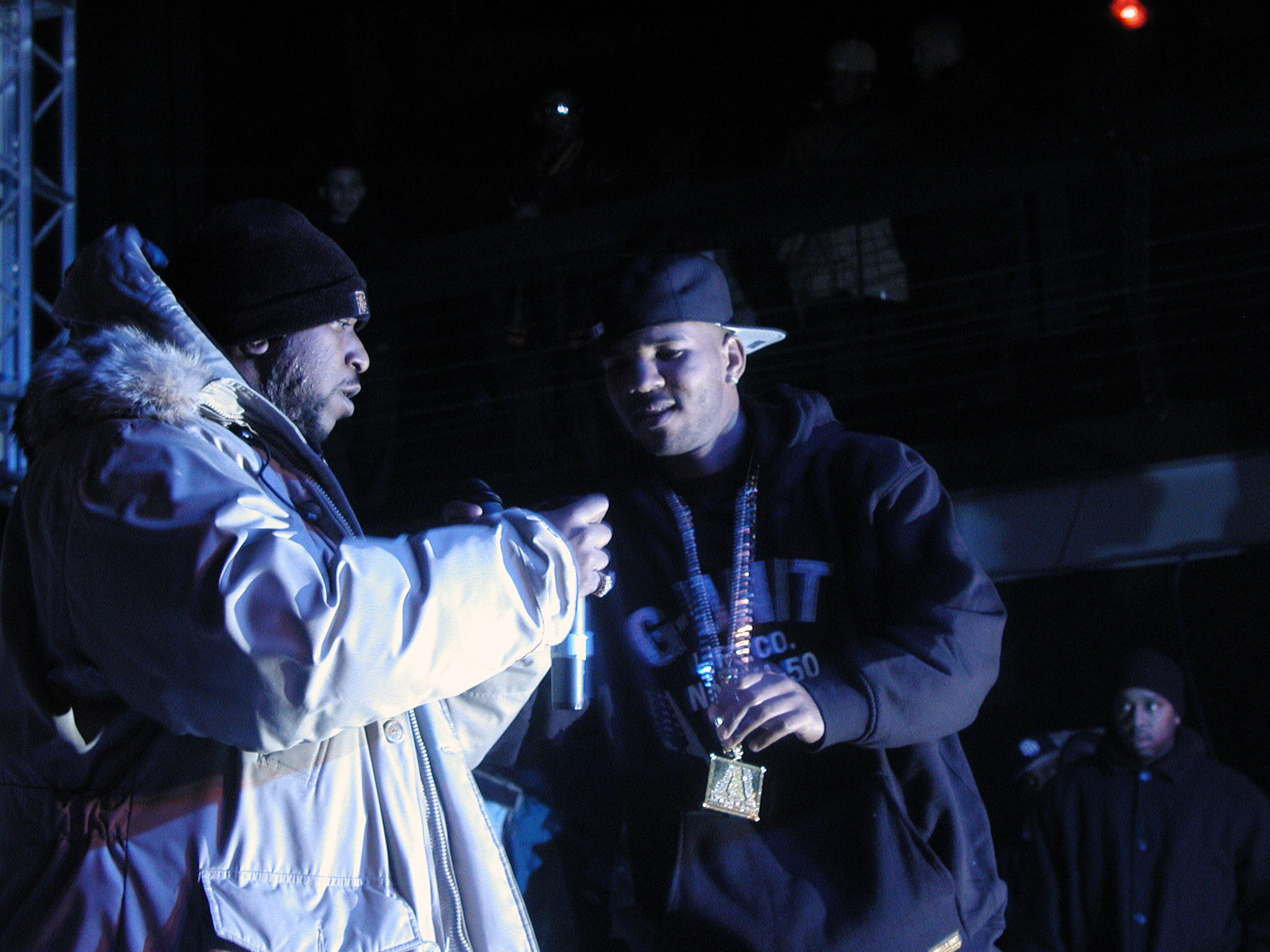
The Game (right) with Kool G Rap in New York City, November 2004

The album was initially meant to be released in October 2004; however, since the other high-profile albums—including Eminem's Encore—were to be released around the same time, it was pushed back to January 18, 2005. On September 28, 2004, the Game released a promotional mixtape entitled Westside Story through Aftermath Entertainment and G-Unit Records. The mixtape was used to promote his major-label debut album, The Documentary. In October 2004, the Game released his first independent album, titled Untold Story, through Get Low Recordz (owned by JT the Bigga Figga). The album sold over 82,000 copies within its first three months. The album featured artists such as Sean T, Young Noble (of the Outlawz) and JT the Bigga Figga. The Game also appeared on various mixtapes, which has been hosted by DJ's such as DJ Kayslay, DJ Whoo Kid and DJ Clue?. The Game also released a second mixtape You Know What It Is Vol. 2 through his own record label and appeared on the video game NBA Live 2004 on a song produced by Fredwreck called "Can't Stop Me". On November 15, 2004, the Game released a promotional mixtape, titled Charge It to the Game: The Mixtape, through Westside Records. The tape was also used to promote The Documentary.

== Singles ==
"Westside Story" was the first official single to be released from The Documentary. The song features guest vocals from American rapper 50 Cent, while the production was handled by Dr. Dre and Scott Storch. The single entered on the US Billboard Hot 100 at number 93, charted at number 55 on the Hot R&B/Hip-Hop Songs, and at number 29 on the Rhythmic Top 40 charts. Rolling Stone described it as "a kind of L.A. version of "In Da Club" with "a simple keyboard part, a spare 808 beat and strings that manage to sound both stressed-out and catchy." The Game has stated that this song is a tribute to Tupac Shakur, with a direct reference to him, saying "I got California love fuckin bitches to that Pac shit." The Game also makes references to Tupac's songs "California Love" and "Against All Odds". Other references includes, Nate Dogg, Tha Dogg Pound (D.P.G.) and their song "New York", Westside Connection, Michael Jackson with his album Thriller, DJ Pooh, and Kool G Rap. There is a remix featuring Snoop Dogg singing the hook and a version with both Snoop Dogg and 50 Cent on it.

"How We Do" was the second official single to be released from The Documentary. The song features guest vocals from American rapper 50 Cent, while the production was handled by Dr. Dre and Mike Elizondo. The single entered on the US Billboard Hot 100 at number four, and stayed for over four weeks. The single also charted at number two on the Hot R&B/Hip-Hop Songs, at number two on the Hot Rap Tracks, at number one on the Rhythmic Top 40, at number three on the Hot Digital Songs, at number 38 on the Latin Tropical Airplay, at number 11 on the Pop 100, at number 14 on the Pop 100 Airplay, at number 14 on the Top 40 Mainstream, and at number 16 on the Top 40 Tracks charts. The single attained respectable international charting. In the United Kingdom the single entered on the UK Singles Chart at number five, in Germany the single entered on the German Singles Chart at number nine, in the Republic of Ireland the single entered on the Irish Singles Chart at number eight, and in Australia the single entered on the Australian Singles Chart at number 18. The single was an instant hit with major air play. It was also moderately successful worldwide, reaching the top twenty in most countries. The music video was directed by Hype Williams. The Recording Industry Association of America certified the single Gold.

"Hate It or Love It" was the third official single to be released from The Documentary. The song features guest vocals from American rapper 50 Cent, while the production was handled by Cool & Dre. The single was the most popular single from the album. The single entered on the US Billboard Hot 100 at number two, charted at number one on the Hot R&B/Hip-Hop Songs, at number one on the Hot Rap Tracks, at number six on the Hot Digital Songs, at number 39 on the Latin Tropical Airplay, at number nine on the Pop 100, at number 13 on the Pop 100 Airplay, at number one on the Rhythmic Top 40, and at number 16 on the Top 40 Mainstream charts. The single attained respectable international charting. In the United Kingdom the single entered on the UK Singles Chart at number four, in Germany the single entered on the German Singles Chart at number 14, in the Republic of Ireland the single entered on the Irish Singles Chart at number five, in Australia the single entered on the Australian Singles Chart at number 23, and in Denmark the single entered the Danish Singles Chart at number 17. The track uses a sample from the song "Rubber Band" performed by the Trammps. At the 2006 Grammy Awards, it was nominated for Best Rap Performance by a Duo or Group and Best Rap Song. The music video, which was directed by the Saline Project, was nominated at the 2005 MTV Video Music Awards for Best Rap Video, but lost to Ludacris' "Number One Spot". The Recording Industry Association of America certified the single Gold.

"Dreams" was the fourth official single to be released from The Documentary. The single entered on the US Billboard Hot 100 at number 32, charted at number 12 on the Hot R&B/Hip-Hop Songs, at number five on the Hot Rap Tracks, at number 74 on the Hot Digital Songs, at number 62 on the Pop 100, and at number 13 on the Rhythmic Top 40. The single attained international charting. In the United Kingdom the single entered on the UK Singles Chart at number eight, in Germany the single entered on the German Singles Chart at number 71, in the Republic of Ireland the single entered on the Irish Singles Chart at number 11, and in Australia the single entered on the Australian Singles Chart at number 42. The song was produced by Kanye West. The track features a sample of "No Money Down" performed by Jerry Butler. Co-Written by Jimmy "Henchmen" Rosemonds' artist, "Beloved". The song was dedicated to Yetunde Price who was shot dead in 2003. One critic wrote the Game "sews together a soulful Martin Luther King Jr. type speech with the acerbic wit and hustler charm of Malcolm X." Phillip Atwell directed the music video. The song is also known for having an incorrect lyric in 'I woke up from that coma 2001, about the same time Dre dropped 2001'. This references the Dr. Dre album 2001, actually released in 1999. The song was placed 16th on about.com's Best Hip-Hop Songs of 2005. And had singer Mýa Harrison in the music video.

"Put You on the Game" was the fifth and final official single from The Documentary. The single was the lowest charting single from the album, reaching only at 96 on the Hot R&B/Hip-Hop Singles & Tracks. The single attained respectable international charting. In the United Kingdom the single entered on the UK Singles Chart at number 46, and in the Republic of Ireland the single entered on the Irish Singles Chart at number 22. The single was produced by Timbaland and co-produced by Danja. This was the first single released by the Game after his truce with 50 Cent fell apart and after the Game released You Know What It Is Vol. 3. It was recently that a lawsuit has been filed from a Major India Record Company Saregama India, Timbaland, co-producer Nate "Danja" Hills, the Game, Interscope Records, along with a few other Production companies are being sued for using an uncleared sample from artist. The music video features the Game with many appearances by his current and former Black Wall Street affiliates. The video shows various places in Los Angeles County; including downtown Los Angeles and Compton. The music video showed these landmarks down at Los Angeles such as Staples Center, the Watts Towers, and LAX. The Game refers to a number of artists, songs and albums in "Put You on the Game"; including The Chronic, N.W.A, Makaveli, the Notorious B.I.G., Public Enemy, Flavor Flav, G-Unit, 50 Cent, Dr. Dre and his song "Let Me Ride", Eve, and Snoop Dogg. During the DVD Stop Snitchin, Stop Lyin, the Game watches the video for this song pausing at specific spots in the video which shows a dead man on the ground blocked off by police tape. The Game then repeatedly states that he is wearing G-Unit sneakers, a diss at 50 Cent saying his career is dead. Damon Johnson directed the music video. Entertainment Weekly called it a "club track so crunkalicious, it's almost shocking that a California newbie — not a Ludacris — was the recipient of its deep-fried Southern charms." The song was placed 44th on About.com's Best Hip-Hop Songs of 2005.

== Critical reception ==
Professional ratings
Aggregate scores
Source	Rating
Metacritic	72/100
Review scores
Source	Rating
AllMusic	4/5 stars
Blender	4/5 stars
Entertainment Weekly	B+
Los Angeles Times	3/4 stars
NME	8/10
Pitchfork	8.3/10
Rolling Stone	3/5 stars
Spin	B+
USA Today	3.5/4 stars
The Village Voice	C−

The Documentary received generally positive reviews. On Metacritic, The Documentary received an aggregate score of 72 out of 100 based on 19 reviews. Pitchfork called it "the best West Coast street-rap album since DJ Quik's 2002 LP Under tha Influence" and described the production as "a rich, triumphant sonic tapestry". AllMusic wrote the album was an "excellent debut" that "hints at a lot of potential" and observed the "most remarkable aspect of the Game is how he can be such a blatant product of gangsta rap... and leave a mark so fast." Rolling Stone noted the Game was "going for emotional impact rather than dazzling wordplay or laughs" and PopMatters described him as "a self-conscious, malicious, nihilistic gangsta rapper with a heart and lyrical content". On the other hand, Robert Christgau believed the album was "dull even when he isn't describing his medical problems, this no-talent is masscult rock at its most brazen". The A.V. Club praised the production for being "a sonic classic of slow-rolling G-funk and glossy hyper-soul", but panned the Game for his name dropping, suggesting if he "cut all the references to rappers and albums... it'd be a good 15 to 20 minutes shorter—and probably a lot more compelling." Billboard declared it "one of the best rap albums of the year" and Entertainment Weekly suggested "with the brightest hip-hop stars aligning for him, the Game may have willed himself a popular masterpiece."

IGN criticized the large number of guest appearances, stating "the propensity of guest artists makes it hard to actually get a grasp on the rising star's own voice." MusicOMH observed "like many rap albums The Documentary is too long, but it maintains a high level of interest" and overall, it was "an impressive effort" that "introduces a strong presence to the West Coast". Stylus Magazine wrote "no one disappoints" and despite the record being "so obviously and deeply grounded in marketing, it's still an outstandingly solid and enjoyable" debut. The New York Times noted the Game's "tough but straightforward rhyme style is appealing but not, usually, enthralling... This is a rapper who almost never forgets himself, who almost never loses himself in syllables just for the fun of it." The Village Voice criticized the rapper's lyrical skills, saying, "the Game's rhymes are about six degrees from totally artless". Yahoo! Music also panned the lyrics for "almost totally lacking in shock value, humour or insight", but praised the production, writing that "musically, this is probably the greatest major label hip-hop album of recent years – a near faultless succession of hi-tech beats and ominously catchy hooks".

=== Accolades ===
The album appeared on numerous music critics' and publications' end-of-year albums lists. Pitchfork placed the album at number 35 on their list of Top 50 Albums of 2005. At the 48th Annual Grammy Awards, the Game was nominated with a total of two nominations, including Best Rap Song and Best Rap Performance by a Duo or Group for the smash single "Hate It or Love It". In 2012 Complex named the album one of the classic albums of the last decade.

== Commercial performance ==
The Game is often credited as a driving force in bringing the West Coast hip-hop scene back to recognition. Before its release, he expressed his desire to have high opening week sales, saying, "I want to sell a million albums in my first week. And if I only sell one album the following week, I'm good." He also admitted feeling nervous about not being able to live up to the industry expectations, saying, "Yeah, I've got some butterflies. I'm worried about my first-week numbers, and I'm worried about living up to the hype." The album debuted at number one on the US Billboard 200 chart, selling 586,000 copies in the first week. The Recording Industry Association of America certified the album double Platinum on March 23, 2005, and it was the tenth best-selling record of the year. As of March 2005, the album has sold over 2.5 million units in the United States.

The Documentary peaked at the top fifteen in most European charts it entered. It peaked at number seven on the UK Albums Chart and remained on the chart for thirty-three weeks. It reached the top ten in the Netherlands, France, Ireland, Switzerland, and the top twenty in Belgium, Germany, and Norway. The album topped the Canadian Albums Chart for three weeks and on March 8, 2005, it was certified Platinum with 100,000 units shipped. It has since sold over five million copies worldwide.

== Track listing ==
No.	Title	Writer(s)	Producer(s)	Length
1.	"Intro"		Dr. Dre; Che Vicious	0:32
2.	"Westside Story" (featuring 50 Cent)	Jayceon Taylor; Curtis Jackson; Andre Young; Scott Storch; Mike Elizondo	Dr. Dre; Storch	3:43
3.	"Dreams"	Taylor; Kanye West	West	4:46
4.	"Hate It or Love It" (featuring 50 Cent)	Taylor; Jackson; Andre Lyon; Marcello Valenzano; Ronnie Baker; Allan Felder; Norman Harris	Cool & Dre	3:26
5.	"Higher"	Taylor; Jackson; Young; Mark Batson; Christopher Pope	Dr. Dre; Batson	4:05
6.	"How We Do" (featuring 50 Cent)	Taylor; Jackson; Young; Elizondo	Dr. Dre; Elizondo	3:55
7.	"Don't Need Your Love" (featuring Faith Evans)	Taylor; Faith Evans; Kejuan Muchita	Havoc; Dr. Dre^{[a]}	4:26
8.	"Church for Thugs"	Taylor; Jackson; Justin Smith	Just Blaze	4:00
9.	"Put You on the Game"	Taylor; Timothy Mosley; Nathaniel Hills	Timbaland; Danja^{[b]}	4:14
10.	"Start from Scratch" (featuring Marsha Ambrosius)	Taylor; Marsha Ambrosius; Young; Storch	Dr. Dre; Storch	4:07
11.	"The Documentary"	Taylor; Jeff Bhasker; Jeff Reed	Bhasker; Reed^{[b]}	4:11
12.	"Runnin'" (featuring Tony Yayo and Dion)	Taylor; Marvin Bernard; Dion Jenkins; Tony Cottrell	Hi-Tek	4:26
13.	"No More Fun and Games"	Taylor; Smith	Just Blaze	2:37
14.	"We Ain't" (featuring Eminem)	Taylor; Marshall Mathers; Steve King	Eminem; Luis Resto^{[a]}	4:46
15.	"Where I'm From" (featuring Nate Dogg)	Taylor; Nathaniel Hale; Bernard Edwards	Focus...	3:08
16.	"Special" (featuring Nate Dogg)	Taylor; Jackson; Hale; Khari Cain	Needlz	3:57
17.	"Don't Worry" (featuring Mary J. Blige)	Taylor; Mary J. Blige; Young; Elizondo; Michael Flowers	Dr. Dre; Elizondo	4:11
18.	"Like Father, Like Son" (featuring Busta Rhymes)	Taylor; Trevor Smith; Anthony Best	Buckwild	5:28

Special edition bonus track
No.	Title	Writer(s)	Producer(s)	Length
19.	"Til’ The Wheels Fall Off" (featuring Mr. Porter)	Taylor; Denaun Porter; Jonathan Reuven Rotem	Mr. Porter	3:17

Notes

- ^{^[a]} signifies an additional producer.
- ^{^[b]} signifies a co-producer.

Sample credits

Information taken from The Documentary's liner notes.

- "Intro" contains a sample of "Down into the Magic" performed by Hanson.
- "Dreams" contains a sample of "No Money Down" performed by Jerry Butler.
- "Hate It or Love It" contains a sample of "Rubberband" performed by The Trammps.
- "Don't Need Your Love" contains a sample of "Not Gon Cry" performed by Mary J. Blige.
- "Put You on the Game" contains a sample of "Baghon Mein Bahar Hai" performed by Mohammed Rafi and Lata Mangeshkar from the soundtrack to Aradhana.
- "The Documentary" contains an audio excerpt from the 2003's film Livin' tha Life.
- "No More Fun and Games" contains a sample of "You Can't Love Me If You Don't Love Me" performed by Lyn Collins and "Gangsta, Gangsta" performed by N.W.A.
- "We Ain't" contains a sample of "The Watcher" performed by Dr. Dre, "One Day at a Time (Em's Version)" performed by Tupac Shakur, Eminem, and the Outlawz, and "Patiently Waiting" performed by 50 Cent and Eminem.
- "Where I'm From" contains a sample of "Amanda" performed by Dionne Warwick.
- "Special" contains a sample of "Catherine Howard" performed by Rick Wakeman.
- "Like Father, Like Son" contains a sample of "Mariya" performed by The Family Circle.

== Personnel ==
Credits for The Documentary adapted from AllMusic.

- 50 Cent – executive producer, writer, vocals
- Marcella "Ms. Lago" Araica – assistant engineer
- Mark Batson – producer
- Steve Baughman – engineer
- Jeff Bhasker – musician, producer
- Jose Borges – assistant engineer
- David Brown – assistant engineer
- Buckwild – producer
- Tony Campana – engineer
- Demacio Castellon – engineer
- Mark Catson – keyboards
- Larry Chatman – production coordination
- Kevin "KD" Davis – engineer
- DJ Hi-Tek – engineer, producer
- Michael Dobmeier – assistant engineer
- Dr. Dre – executive producer, mixing, producer
- Jimmy Douglas – mixing
- Mike Elizondo – bass, keyboards, musician
- Eminem – mixing, producer, vocals
- Focus... – musician, producer
- Scott Gutierrez – assistant engineer
- Robert Hannon – engineer
- Havoc – producer
- Nathaniel "Danjahandz" Hills – producer
- Keenan "Kee Note" Holloway – bass
- Lionel "LJ" Holwan – keyboards
- Ken Huffnagle – engineer
- Mauricio "Veto" Irragorri – engineer, mixing
- Glenn Jefferies – guitar
- D. Diana Jenkins – vocals
- Just Blaze – producer
- Rouble Kapoor – assistant engineer
- Wayne Kee – guitar
- Steven King – bass, engineer, guitar, mixing
- Mike Lynn – A&R
- Jonathan Mannion – photography
- Natasha Mathis – vocals
- Kyla Miller – engineer
- Needlz – producer
- Ervin Pope – keyboards
- Oscar "Filtrate" Ramierez – engineer
- Jeff Reed – engineer, producer
- Luis Resto – keyboards, producer
- Angelo Sanders – A&R
- Jason Schweitzer – engineer
- Ed Scratch – engineer
- Justin Smith – mixing
- Scott Storch – musician, producer
- Tank – scratching
- Jayceon Taylor – writer
- Timbaland – mixing, producer, vocals
- Che Vicious – producer
- Joe Warlick – engineer
- Kanye West – producer
- Ryan West – engineer, mixing

== Charts ==
=== Weekly charts ===
Chart (2005)	Peak position
Australian Albums (ARIA)	42
Australian Urban Albums (ARIA)	7
Austrian Albums (Ö3 Austria)	44
Belgian Albums (Ultratop Flanders)	17
Belgian Albums (Ultratop Wallonia)	51
Canadian Albums (Billboard)	1
Danish Albums (Hitlisten)	33
Dutch Albums (Album Top 100)	10
French Albums (SNEP)	7
German Albums (Offizielle Top 100)	11
Irish Albums (IRMA)	6
Italian Albums (FIMI)	67
New Zealand Albums (RMNZ)	3
Norwegian Albums (VG-lista)	11
Scottish Albums (Official Charts)	10
Swiss Albums (Schweizer Hitparade)	8
UK Albums (Official Charts)	7
UK R&B Albums (Official Charts)	1
US Billboard 200	1
US Top R&B/Hip-Hop Albums (Billboard)	1
US Top Rap Albums (Billboard)	1

=== Year-end charts ===
Chart (2005)	Position
Belgian Albums (Ultratop Flanders)	49
Dutch Albums (Album Top 100)	56
French Albums (SNEP)	104
German Albums (Offizielle Top 100)	75
New Zealand Albums (RMNZ)	27
Swiss Albums (Schweizer Hitparade)	100
UK Albums (OCC)	66
US Billboard 200	16
US Top R&B/Hip-Hop Albums (Billboard)	5
Worldwide Albums (IFPI)	18

== Certifications ==
Region	Certification	Certified units/sales
Australia (ARIA)	Gold	35,000^{^}
Canada (Music Canada)	Platinum	100,000^{^}
Denmark (IFPI Danmark)	2× Platinum	40,000^{‡}
Germany (BVMI)	Gold	100,000^{‡}
Ireland (IRMA)	Platinum	15,000^{^}
New Zealand (RMNZ)	Platinum	15,000^{^}
United Kingdom (BPI)	Platinum	413,519
United States (RIAA)	2× Platinum	2,000,000^{^}
^{^} Shipments figures based on certification alone.^{‡} Sales+streaming figures based on certification alone.
