= Put You on the Game =

Single by the Game

from the album The Documentary
- Released: August 30, 2005
- Recorded: 2004
- Genre: Gangsta rap
- Length: 4:14
- Label: G-Unit/Aftermath/Interscope
- Songwriters: Jayceon Taylor, Tim Mosley, Nate Hills
- Producers: Timbaland, Danja

The Game singles chronology
"Playa's Only" (2005)	"Put You on the Game" (2005)	"It's Okay (One Blood)" (2006)

Music video
- "Put You on the Game" on YouTube

"Put You on the Game" is a single by American rapper and West Coast hip hop artist the Game, released as the final single from his debut album, The Documentary. Written by the Game himself and produced by both Timbaland and co-produced by Danja, the song was the album's fifth official single, and it was released on August 30, 2005. This was the first single released by the Game after a beef with former fellow G-Unit member 50 Cent fell apart and after the Game released the mixtape titled You Know What It Is Vol. 3. Also failing to match the popularity of his previous singles, and failing to chart on the Billboard Hot 100, the song peaked at number 96 on the Hot R&B/Hip-Hop Songs chart. The song was placed 44th on About.com's Best Hip-Hop Songs of 2005.

The Game refers to a number of artists, songs and albums in "Put You on the Game", including The Chronic, N.W.A, Makaveli, the Notorious B.I.G., Public Enemy, Flavor Flav, G-Unit, 50 Cent, Dr. Dre and his song "Let Me Ride", Eve, and Snoop Dogg. During the DVD Stop Snitchin, Stop Lyin the Game watches the video for this song pausing at specific spots in the video which shows a dead man on the ground blocked off by police tape. The Game then repeatedly states that he is wearing G-Unit sneakers, a diss at 50 Cent saying his career is dead.

== Background and recording ==
The Game's management team were keen for him to work with Timbaland, as they felt The Documentary needed another potential single and wanted to take advantage of Timbaland's popularity at the time. Per Aftermath Entertainment A&R Angelo Sanders, once the collaboration had been arranged Timbaland would frequently turn up to the recording studio at "two, three in the morning" having been out partying the night before, supposedly to give him a better idea of current music trends. This creative process eventually inspired him to create the instrumental of "Put You on the Game".

== Lawsuit ==
Two years after its release a lawsuit was filed from a Major India Record Company Saregama India, Timbaland, co-producer Nate "Danja" Hills, the Game, Interscope Records along with a few other Production companies were being sued for using an uncleared sample. The sample in question is from the Bollywood song "Baghon Mein Bahar Hai" from the 1969 soundtrack to the movie Aradhana.

== Music video ==
The music video features the Game with many appearances by his current and former Black Wall Street affiliates. The video shows various places in Los Angeles County, including downtown Los Angeles and Compton. The video shows many Los Angeles landmarks such as Staples Center, the Watts Towers, and LAX. Video model Maliah Michel and The Game's brother Big Fase 100 make cameo appearances.

== Remixes ==
- There is a remix of the song featuring Fabolous and Fat Joe. Another remix was made later with Kanye West. A third remix was made featuring Bun B, Chamillionaire and Slim Thug which can be heard on DJ Smallz' mixtape, Southern Smoke 21.
- Psychopathic Rydas used the beat on their album Duk Da Fuk Down. The title of the song is "Killin' Shit" and it was released on Joe and Joey Records.
- Chamillionaire and his brother Rasaq performed a freestyle using the beat which was on a DJ Obscene mixtape entitled "Houston We Have A Problem Vol. 1".
- Trae and his group Assholes By Nature used the beat to make the song called I'm a Asshole which can be heard on a DJ Drama mixtape.
- There are also remixes done by Crooked I, off of his Hip Hop Weekly series, as well as by the Re-Up Gang, consisting of members Malice and Pusha, from the duo Clipse, and Ab Liva and Sandman.
- Kanye West made a remix.

== Track listing ==
=== Maxi single ===
1. "Put You on the Game"
2. "Runnin'"
3. "Put You on the Game" (Instrumental)
4. "Put You on the Game" (Video)

== Personnel ==
- Producer: Timbaland & Danja
- Mixer: Timbaland, Jimmy Douglas & Bryan Thomas
- Additional Vocals: Timbaland & Demacio "Demo" Castellon

== Charts ==
Chart (2005–06)	Peak position
Ireland (IRMA)	22
UK Singles (Official Charts)	46
US Hot R&B/Hip-Hop Songs (Billboard)	96
