= Westside Story (The Game album) =

Mixtape by the Game
- Released: September 28, 2004
- Recorded: 2004
- Genre: West Coast hip-hop
- Label: Aftermath Entertainment
- Producer: Dr. Dre (also exec.)

Westside Story is the second mixtape by the Game. It was released on September 28, 2004, through Aftermath Entertainment and was used to promote his forthcoming debut album, The Documentary. It is available for free download at DatPiff.

== Track listing ==
No.	Title	Instrumental	Length
1.	"Westside Story (Remix)" (featuring 50 Cent and Snoop Dogg)	"Westside Story" by the Game featuring 50 Cent	4:16
2.	"Nothing But a Game Thing"	"Nuthin' but a 'G' Thang" by Dr. Dre featuring Snoop Doggy Dogg	3:15
3.	"If You Want It" (featuring Antonio)		3:36
4.	"The Games" (featuring Juelz Santana and Jim Jones)		4:15
5.	"State Your Name, Gangsta" (featuring Lil' Flip and Cassidy)	Swizz Beatz	3:12
6.	"Compton 4 Life" (featuring MC Eiht)		2:53
7.	"Westside Connection" (featuring Stack Bundles and Joe Budden)	"Gangsta Nation" by Westside Connection featuring Nate Dogg	3:43
8.	"Black Wall Street Gangsta" (featuring Billboard)	"It's Funky Enough" by the D.O.C.	3:25
9.	"Died Too Soon"		0:53
10.	"Living In Compton"		4:46
11.	"Street Dreams" (featuring Fabolous and J-Hood)	Street Dreams by Nas	2:11
12.	"Wanna Put Me Under"		2:50
13.	"My Confession (Remix)" (featuring Lil Eazy-E)		2:07
14.	"A Million and One Bad Habits" (featuring Savage)		3:47
15.	"The Whole City Behind Us" (featuring Kanye West and Ludacris)	Kanye West	3:23
16.	"Put Ur Gunz In the Air"		2:56
17.	"Still Cruisin'" (featuring Eazy-E)		2:28
18.	"Make 'Em Stomp" (Young Buck featuring the Game and Ludacris)	"Stomp" by Young Buck featuring the Game and Ludacris	4:44
19.	"2 of Amerikaz Most Wanted" (featuring Fabolous)	"2 of Amerikaz Most Wanted" by 2Pac featuring Snoop Doggy Dogg	1:13
20.	"Feel My Pain" (featuring Lil Scrappy)		2:47
21.	"I Got That Feeling" (featuring Sky Balla)		4:24
22.	"Certified Gangstas (Remix)" (featuring Jim Jones and Lil Eazy-E)	Dwayne Holmes	4:48
23.	"Get Your Money Right" (featuring Dr. Dre and Jay-Z)		3:16
