= Higher (The Game song) =

Single by the Game

from the album The Documentary
- Released: March 7, 2005
- Recorded: 2004
- Studio: Record One (Sherman Oaks, Los Angeles)
- Genre: West Coast hip hop; gangsta rap
- Length: 4:05
- Label: Aftermath; G-Unit; Black Wall Street; Interscope
- Songwriters: Jayceon Taylor; Curtis Jackson; Andre Young; Mike Elizondo; Mark Batson; Christopher Pope
- Producers: Dr. Dre; Mark Batson

Game singles chronology
| "Hate It or Love It" (2005) | "Higher" (2005) | "Dreams" (2005) |

"Higher" is a song by West Coast rapper the Game, released as the fourth single from his debut album The Documentary exclusively in France on March 7, 2005.

== Composition ==
In the song, rapper Dr. Dre tells listeners to "Look out for Detox", which at the time was his anticipated third studio album. Now, over ten years after the song's release, Detox has yet to be released.

On August 10, 2022, 50 Cent's reference version of this song leaked online.

== Chart performance ==
Having received a single release in France, the song debuted at number forty-seven (47) on the country's national singles chart. Although "Higher" was not officially released in the United States, it peaked at number eight on the US Bubbling Under R&B/Hip-Hop Singles chart based on airplay.

| Chart (2005) | Peak position |
|---|---|
| France (SNEP) | 47 |
| US Bubbling Under R&B/Hip-Hop Singles (Billboard) | 8 |
