= Hate It or Love It =

2005 single by the Game

Single by the Game featuring 50 Cent

from the album The Documentary
- Released: January 22, 2005
- Recorded: 2004
- Genre: Hip hop; R&B
- Length: 3:26
- Label: Black Wall Street; G-Unit; Aftermath; Interscope
- Songwriters: Jayceon Taylor; Curtis Jackson; Andre Lyon; Marcello Valenzano; Ronnie Baker; Allan Felder; Norman Harris
- Producers: Cool & Dre; Dr. Dre

The Game singles chronology
"How We Do" (2004)	"Hate It or Love It" (2005)	"Dreams" (2005)

50 Cent singles chronology
"Disco Inferno" (2004)	"Hate It or Love It" (2005)	"Candy Shop" (2005)

Music video
- "Hate It or Love It" on YouTube

"Hate It or Love It" is a song by American rapper the Game featuring fellow American rapper 50 Cent. It was released as the third single from the former's debut studio album The Documentary (2005). The song was produced by Cool & Dre with additional production from Dr. Dre. The song features a music sample of "Rubber Band" by the Trammps from their album The Legendary Zing Album (1975).

"Hate It or Love It" peaked at number two on the Billboard Hot 100 for five consecutive weeks, becoming the Game's second top ten song on the chart as a lead artist and 50 Cent's eighth. It is the Game's highest-charting single on the Billboard Hot 100 to date. The song was kept from the number one position on the Billboard Hot 100 by another 50 Cent single, "Candy Shop". "Hate It or Love It" reached the number one spot on the Hot R&B/Hip-Hop Songs, making it yet again another top ten hit on the chart alongside "How We Do" which also featured 50 Cent. Outside of the United States, "Hate It or Love It" peaked within the top ten of the charts in multiple countries, including the Netherlands, New Zealand, the Republic of Ireland, and the United Kingdom.

At the 2006 48th Annual Grammy Awards, the song was nominated for two Grammy Awards, including Grammy Award for Best Rap Song and Grammy Award for Best Rap Performance by a Duo or Group but lost in both categories to Kanye West's "Diamonds from Sierra Leone" and the Black Eyed Peas' "Don't Phunk with My Heart", respectively.

== Background and conception ==
The song first began to be conceived during the middle period of the recording process for The Documentary in early 2004. The Game was staying in New York while frequently being driven to 50 Cent's mansion in Connecticut, listening and writing to beats along the way. When the Game first heard the beat for "Hate It or Love It", he was looking for a harder-hitting track but the second time he was inspired to write his verse.

The chorus is rapped and written by 50 Cent, who helped with the rest of the writing process and recording for the song along with the Game. The song was even suggested for 50 Cent's album The Massacre (2005), due to 50 Cent's large artistic input.

When the Game arrived at the mansion on the day of recording, 50 Cent presented him with several already part-completed records, with variously placed verses and choruses. The Game wrote his final verse first and worked backward, to avoid tiredness affecting his later verses. After 50 Cent heard the final version of the song after the recording process had finished, he was excited by its potential and felt the song would have to be one of the album's singles. It was later released as the album's third, after "Westside Story" and "How We Do", both of which also featured 50 Cent.

The original production for "Hate It or Love It" first surfaced on a compilation CD, put together by Cool & Dre (who had been in contact with the Game since early 2002), and released unofficially to the local rap community. After G-Unit Records producer Sha Money XL received a copy of this disc, he requested a meeting with the duo, feeling that the song had much potential to be a hit. After Dr. Dre heard the original production, he made sonic alterations and, according to Aftermath Entertainment A&R Mike Lynn, "made it sound like a record", a process he carried out on all of the other tracks on The Documentary. When Interscope Records chairman Jimmy Iovine later requested to hear the original production, he admitted could not tell the difference. Cool & Dre later praised the quality of Dr. Dre's mix, stating that "Dre brought it to life... [As a mixer is what] I think is his best quality... his ear for instrument placement is amazing".

== Composition ==
Built around a sample of the song "Rubber Band" by the Trammps, "Hate It or Love It" is hip hop song that is backed by a soul-orientated production, which contains a "smoothed out R&B funk vibe".

== Critical reception ==
"Hate It or Love It" received general acclaim from critics. Scott McKeating of Stylus Magazine wrote that "It's a great piece of warm soul-fuelled hip-hop, in which guest star 50 Cent manages to steal the show, considerably stepping up his lyrical content to squash together some great but clichéd lines against a level of his infamous smart arsed profundity." IGN described the song as "a smoothed out R&B funk vibe underneath the tales of the hood." Pitchfork listed the song as the 93rd best song of the 2000s.

The song has earned the Game award nominations. In 2006 "Hate It or Love It" was nominated at the 48th Annual Grammy Awards for both Grammy Award for Best Rap Song and Grammy Award for Best Rap Performance by a Duo or Group, but lost in both categories to Kanye West's "Diamonds from Sierra Leone" and the Black Eyed Peas' "Don't Phunk with My Heart", respectively. "Hate It or Love It" was named number one on About.com's Best Hip-Hop Songs of 2005 and was ranked at number 43 on VH1's "100 Greatest Songs of Hip Hop".

== Music video ==
The setting of the music video alternates between Compton, California and Jamaica, Queens, New York City. The video recalls the rough childhoods of 50 Cent and the Game, showing where they come from, what it was like living in their neighborhoods, and the struggles they overcame as kids to become rappers. Tequan Richmond portrays the Game and Zachary Williams plays 50 Cent in their youth. In one scene, the two are caught spraypainting "N.W.A" on a wall, resulting in their arrest by two policemen. Big Fase 100, members of Black Wall Street, Tony Yayo and Lloyd Banks make cameo appearances.

This video was nominated at the MTV Video Music Awards of 2005 for Best Rap Video, but lost to the video for Ludacris' song "Number One Spot".

The music video was directed by the Saline Project and has received over 355 million views on YouTube as of June 2024.

== Remixes ==
There have been several remixes of the track:

- The official remix appears as track 22 on 50 Cent's album The Massacre as "Hate It or Love It (G-Unit Remix)" as a bonus track. It features the rest of the G-Unit members: Lloyd Banks, Young Buck and Tony Yayo. The first time the chorus is performed in this version, it is identical to the original, but the consecutive choruses have 50 Cent's line followed by another member of G-Unit rapping the Game's original line. While 50 Cent's opening verse and bridge are included in this version (though the bridge is altered), the Game's second verse is omitted and replaced with new lyrics. It is the only song recorded with all five members of G-Unit. This version has been certified Platinum by the RIAA.
- Mary J. Blige covers the song on the single "MJB da MVP" from her multi-platinum album The Breakthrough, with 50 Cent rapping his chorus line and Blige continuing with an altered version of the Game's original line. The Game is featured on the remix of the song. This is the second official remix.
- The Game's mixtape, You Know What It Is, Vol. 3, remastered into a diss towards G-Unit called "Hate It or Love It (G-Unot Remix)". On this, the lyrics are insulting all the members of G-Unit.
- Cuban Link remixed the song and titled it "Swimmin' With Sharks" which features vocals from Rell and is included on Cuban's mixtape Man On Fire.
- The Re-Up Gang featured a remix of the track on their mixtape, We Got It 4 Cheap: Vol. 2. The song features the four members of the group rapping about their troubles in the past.
- A sequel of this song titled Love It or Hate It was included in his 2026 album The Documentary III. It features Snoop Dogg.

== Awards ==
Year	Ceremony	Award	Result
2005	BET Awards	Best Collaboration	Nominated
2005	MTV Video Music Awards	Best Rap Video	Nominated
2006	Grammy Awards	Best Rap Song	Nominated
2006	Grammy Awards	Best Rap Performance By a Duo or Group	Nominated

== Charts ==
=== Weekly charts ===
2005 weekly chart performance for "Hate It or Love It"
Chart (2005)	Peak position
Australia (ARIA)	21
Australian Urban (ARIA)	11
Austria (Ö3 Austria Top 40)	23
Belgium (Ultratop 50 Flanders)	19
Belgium (Ultratop 50 Wallonia)	22
Canada CHR/Pop Top 30 (Radio & Records)	9
Czech Republic (IFPI)	12
Denmark (Tracklisten)	17
Europe (Eurochart Hot 100)	12
France (SNEP)	42
Germany (GfK)	14
Greece (IFPI)	14
Hungary (Editors' Choice Top 40)	34
Ireland (IRMA)	5
Netherlands (Dutch Top 40)	5
Netherlands (Single Top 100)	5
New Zealand (Recorded Music NZ)	3
Norway (VG-lista)	19
Scottish Singles Sales (Official Charts)	4
Switzerland (Schweizer Hitparade)	12
UK Singles (Official Charts)	4
UK Hip Hop/R&B (Official Charts)	2
US Billboard Hot 100	2
US Hot R&B/Hip-Hop Songs (Billboard)	1
US Hot Rap Songs (Billboard)	1
US Pop Airplay (Billboard)	16
US Rhythmic Airplay (Billboard)	1

2022–2023 weekly chart performance for "Hate It or Love It"
Chart (2022–2023)	Peak position
Latvia (LAIPA)	7
Lithuania (AGATA)	19
Sweden (Sverigetopplistan)	73

2025 weekly chart performance for "Hate It or Love It"
Chart (2025)	Peak position
Greece International (IFPI)	40

=== Year-end charts ===
2005 year-end chart performance for "Hate It or Love It"
Chart (2005)	Position
Australia (ARIA)	95
Germany (Media Control GfK)	80
Netherlands (Dutch Top 40)	78
Netherlands (Single Top 100)	73
New Zealand (RIANZ)	21
Switzerland (Schweizer Hitparade)	97
UK Singles (OCC)	49
UK Urban (Music Week)	20
US Billboard Hot 100	24
US Hot R&B/Hip-Hop Songs (Billboard)	28

2022 year-end chart performance for "Hate It or Love It"
Chart (2022)	Position
Lithuania (AGATA)	72

== Certifications ==
Certifications for "Hate It or Love It"
Region	Certification	Certified units/sales
Australia (ARIA)	3× Platinum	210,000^{‡}
Denmark (IFPI Danmark)	2× Platinum	180,000^{‡}
Germany (BVMI)	Platinum	300,000^{‡}
Italy (FIMI)	Gold	50,000^{‡}
New Zealand (RMNZ)	7× Platinum	210,000^{‡}
Spain (Promusicae)	Gold	30,000^{‡}
United Kingdom (BPI)	3× Platinum	1,800,000^{‡}
United States (RIAA)	Gold	500,000^{*}
Streaming
Greece (IFPI Greece)	3× Platinum	6,000,000^{†}
^{*} Sales figures based on certification alone.^{‡} Sales+streaming figures based on certification alone.^{†} Streaming-only figures based on certification alone.

== Release history ==
Region	Date	Format(s)	Label	Ref.
United States	March 14, 2005	Urban contemporary radio	G-Unit, Aftermath, Interscope	
United States	March 21, 2005	Contemporary hit radio	G-Unit, Aftermath, Interscope	
Germany	May 9, 2005	Maxi CD	G-Unit, Aftermath, Interscope	
Germany	May 13, 2005	CD	G-Unit, Aftermath, Interscope	

== See also ==
- List of number-one R&B singles of 2005 (U.S.)
