= Inglewood Cobras =

Basketball team in Inglewood, California

- Founded: 2005
- League: ABA 2005-2006
- Based in: Inglewood, California
- Colors: Black and white
- Owner: Jayceon Taylor aka The Game
- Head coach: Sean Higgins
- Championships: 0

Inglewood Cobras was a professional basketball team of the American Basketball Association (known as the ABA). It was formed in 2005, and based in Inglewood, California. It played in the league's Spencer Haywood Division. Inglewood Cobras folded after playing five games in the ABA league's 2005–2006 season.

== Ownership and roster ==
One of the high-profile investors in the team was well-known American rapper The Game. The 6-foot-4 listed by his real name Jayceon Taylor also played for team as a shooting guard and small forward. The Game was a standout basketball player at Compton High School, alongside future NBA player Baron Davis. He received a basketball scholarship, but was dismissed from his school during his freshman year over drug allegations. Later on, The Game had been featured in several Entertainers Basketball Classics (EBC) playing against NBA talents.

The team was coached by former NBA player Sean Higgins. He was also included in the team's roster (as a coach / player). Other players included Kevin Bradley, Kenny Jackson, and Tarron Williams.
