= Let Me Ride =

1993 single by Dr. Dre

Single by Dr. Dre

from the album The Chronic
- Released: August 28, 1993
- Recorded: 1992
- Studio: Death Row (Los Angeles, California)
- Genre: West Coast hip-hop; gangsta rap; G-funk; R&B
- Length: 4:21
- Label: Death Row; Interscope; Priority
- Songwriters: Andre Young; Eric Collins; Calvin Broadus; George Clinton; William Collins; Bernie Worrell
- Producer: Dr. Dre

Dr. Dre singles chronology
"Fuck wit Dre Day (And Everybody's Celebratin')" (1993)	"Let Me Ride" (1993)	"U Better Recognize" (1994)

Music video
- "Let Me Ride" on YouTube

"Let Me Ride" is a song by American rapper and producer Dr. Dre, released in August 1993 by Death Row, Interscope and Priority as the third and final single from his debut studio album, The Chronic (1992). It experienced moderate success on the charts, until it became a massive hit when Dre won Best Rap Solo Performance for at the 36th Annual Grammy Awards. The song features singers Ruben and Jewell, as well as uncredited vocals by fellow rapper Snoop Dogg, who wrote the song.

Dr. Dre's lyrics were written by RBX, originally intended for a different track. Dr. Dre, RBX and Snoop Dogg share songwriting credits for the song.

"Let Me Ride"'s chorus involves both a sample and an interpolation of the chorus of the 1976 Parliament song "Mothership Connection (Star Child)", which itself quotes the Negro spiritual "Swing Down Sweet Chariot". "Let Me Ride" also samples James Brown's "Funky Drummer" and Bill Withers's 1973 single "Kissing My Love".

== Music video ==
The accompanying music video for "Let Me Ride" was shot on location at Slauson Avenue in Los Angeles and was directed by Dr. Dre. It is the second lowrider cult video of Dre's cinematographic "walk of life" that was nominated for a MTV Video Music Award for Best Rap Video in the same year. The video begins with Dre, in his home watching the $20 Sack Pyramid (a track skit from the album shown as a game show in the video), taking a phone call and being invited to a Parliament concert. He then heads out in his lowrider and the song begins. Many helicopter-view camshots of the super-highways of Compton follow, some cuts of Snoop, a car-jacking scene, and various footage of Dre picking up girls, all of which leads to a street party outside the concert venue. Ice Cube makes a cameo appearance, walking out from a women's bathroom saying "Damn right, it was a good day", referring to his hit single released the same year, and also officially squashing the beef between Dre and Ice Cube which had existed since Ice Cube left N.W.A. It has been proposed that Danny Partridge may have cameos in the video, though the rumors were never confirmed.

The final shots of the video feature footage from Parliament-Funkadelic's 1976 earth tour, including the Starchild flying on wires with the bop gun, the band singing "Mothership Connection", which "Let Me Ride" samples, and concludes with George Clinton departing into the Mothership with a plume of smoke, upon which Dre's face is superimposed.

Rapper Warren G (Dre's stepbrother) makes a cameo appearance, along with rappers The D.O.C. and The Lady of Rage, Death Row Records co-founder Suge Knight, producer Bonita "Bo" Money, and actress Jada Pinkett-Smith.

The video features a 1964 Chevrolet Impala, which would be used in many other Dr. Dre and Snoop Dogg videos.

== Remixes ==
An official remix of the song features full verses from Snoop Dogg and Daz, and an appearance by George Clinton. It was recorded simultaneously with the original version and was released on the 12-inch vinyl when the solo version was chosen to be a part of the album. The full version of the remix is 11 minutes long and features a guitar solo by Michael Hampton. The beat was later remade as a G-Funk remix and the instrumental was used for the Up In Smoke Tour in 2000. Dr. Dre also produced the beat for the remix.

== References in popular culture ==
Nate Dogg refers to "Let Me Ride" in Warren G's 1994 song "Regulate", in which he sings, "She said 'my car's broke down and you seem real nice, would ya let me ride?'"

Rapper Fabolous, in his 2001 hit "Can't Deny It", had the lyric "bitches be yellin "let me ride", like I'm Snoop, and Dr. Dre." Rapper The Game similarly refers to "Let Me Ride" in his 2005 song "Put You on the Game", where he claims to be in a car with Dre in the back and "bitches screaming, 'Let me ride!'"

== Track listing ==
- CD single
1. "Let Me Ride" (Radio Mix) - 4:22
2. "Let Me Ride" (Extended Club Mix) - 11:01
3. "One Eight Seven" - 4:18
- 12" vinyl
1. "Let Me Ride" (Extended Club Mix) - 11:01
2. "Let Me Ride" (Radio Mix) - 4:22
3. "One Eight Seven" - 4:18
- US 12" vinyl
1. "Let Me Ride" (Extended Club Mix) - 11:01
2. "Let Me Ride" (Radio Mix) - 4:22
3. "Let Me Ride" (LP Version) - 4:47
- Cassette single
1. "Let Me Ride" (Radio Mix) - 4:22
2. "Let Me Ride" (Extended Club Mix) - 11:01

== Charts ==
Chart (1993)	Peak position
US Billboard Hot 100	34
US Hot R&B/Hip-Hop Songs (Billboard)	3
US Hot Rap Songs (Billboard)	3
US Rhythmic Airplay (Billboard)	1
US Cash Box Top 100	31

== Awards and nominations ==
Year	Awards Ceremony	Award	Results
1994	Grammy Awards	Best Rap Soloist	Won
