= How We Do (song) =

Song by the Game, featuring 50 Cent

Single by the Game featuring 50 Cent

from the album The Documentary
- Released: October 30, 2004
- Recorded: 2004
- Studio: Can-Am Studios (Tarzana, Los Angeles); Record One (Sherman Oaks, Los Angeles)
- Genre: Gangsta rap; hip hop
- Length: 3:55
- Label: Black Wall Street; G-Unit; Aftermath; Interscope
- Songwriters: Jayceon Taylor; Curtis Jackson; Mike Elizondo; Andre Young
- Producers: Dr. Dre; Mike Elizondo

The Game singles chronology
"Westside Story" (2004)	"How We Do" (2004)	"Hate It or Love It" (2005)

50 Cent singles chronology
"Westside Story" (2004)	"How We Do" (2004)	"Disco Inferno" (2004)

Music video
- "How We Do" on YouTube

"How We Do" is a song by American rapper and West Coast hip hop artist the Game, featuring rapper 50 Cent from his debut album, The Documentary. Produced by Dr. Dre and Mike Elizondo, it was released as the album's second official single in late 2004.

"How We Do" achieved commercial success worldwide. The track peaked within the top 10 in multiple countries, including the United Kingdom, Ireland, Netherlands, Switzerland, Germany and New Zealand. The single was commercially successful in the United States, peaking at number 4 on the Billboard Hot 100 and remaining on the chart for 28 consecutive weeks. "How We Do" marked Game's first top-ten single on the chart as a lead artist and also marked 50 Cent's fifth overall top-ten single.

== Background and recording ==
The Game first discovered the instrumental for "How We Do" whilst going through a folder of Dr. Dre's productions without his permission; the audio file was labelled "Fresh '83". Dr. Dre did not like the production at first, but The Game convinced him to let him write some lyrics to it, and after hearing The Game perform his first verse Dr. Dre decided that the song should be completed. Once The Game had completed all his verses, Dr. Dre commissioned 50 Cent to write the chorus, who while doing so decided he also wanted to appear on the song; he rewrote and replaced The Game's intended second verse with one of his own.

== Commercial success ==
The song was a hit at Urban and Rhythmic radio stations in America, and was a success on American mainstream pop music radio stations. In the U.S., the song debuted at number 65 and peaked at number 4 on the Billboard Hot 100 in early 2005, making it the Game's first top-five hit. The song was also certified Gold by the RIAA.

The song fell down the charts relatively quickly for a top-ten hit. This was likely due to an overabundance of Shady/Aftermath/G-Unit-related singles all competing for airtime during this time period, as Eminem and G-Unit members 50 Cent, Lloyd Banks, Young Buck, and Game all had songs on the chart during the months of late 2004 and early 2005. However, despite its fast fall out of the top twenty, the song managed to hang on in the lower rungs of the top 40 for months, in spite of, or possibly because of, the Game's follow up, "Hate It or Love It" becoming even bigger on pop radio only a few weeks after "How We Do" had peaked. Dr. Dre had produced "How We Do" during his time in G-Unit.

== Music video ==
The music video was directed by Hype Williams; it features cameos by Dr. Dre, Olivia, Michael K. Williams as well as DJ Quik. It showcases night shots of Compton and Los Angeles; as well as a Dodge Magnum, driven by the Game, and a Cadillac Escalade, driven by 50 Cent; as it finally cuts to a nightclub. DJ Quik can be briefly seen towards the end, raising a glass of champagne. The music video on YouTube has received over 215 million views as of April 2024.

== Single track listing ==
=== A-side ===
- "How We Do (edited)" (4:03)

=== B-side ===
- "How We Do (edited)" (4:03)
- "How We Do (explicit)" (4:20)
- "How We Do (instrumental)" (4:04)
- "How We Do (a cappella)" (3:01)

== Charts ==
=== Weekly charts ===
Chart (2004–2005)	Peak position
Australia (ARIA)	24
Australian Urban (ARIA)	7
Austria (Ö3 Austria Top 40)	18
Belgium (Ultratop 50 Flanders)	13
Belgium (Ultratop 50 Wallonia)	17
Canada CHR/Pop Top 30 (Radio & Records)	11
European Hot 100 Singles (Billboard)	16
France (SNEP)	30
Germany (GfK)	9
Greece (IFPI)	19
Ireland (IRMA)	8
Netherlands (Dutch Top 40)	5
Netherlands (Single Top 100)	5
New Zealand (Recorded Music NZ)	4
Norway (VG-lista)	19
Scottish Singles Sales (Official Charts)	8
Switzerland (Schweizer Hitparade)	8
UK Hip Hop/R&B (Official Charts)	3
UK Singles (Official Charts)	5
US Billboard Hot 100	4
US Hot R&B/Hip-Hop Songs (Billboard)	2
US Pop Songs (Billboard)	14
US Hot Rap Songs (Billboard)	2

=== Year-end charts ===
Chart (2005)	Position
Belgium (Ultratop 50 Flanders)	81
European Hot 100 Singles (Billboard)	72
Germany (Media Control GfK)	65
Netherlands (Dutch Top 40)	77
Netherlands (Single Top 100)	75
Switzerland (Schweizer Hitparade)	52
UK Singles (OCC)	93
UK Urban (Music Week) "How We Do" / "WestSide Story"	13
US Billboard Hot 100	19
US Hot R&B/Hip-Hop Songs (Billboard)	8

== Certifications ==
Region	Certification	Certified units/sales
Denmark (IFPI Danmark)	Gold	45,000^{‡}
Germany (BVMI)	Platinum	300,000^{‡}
New Zealand (RMNZ)	3× Platinum	90,000^{‡}
United Kingdom (BPI)	Platinum	600,000^{‡}
United States (RIAA) Digital	Gold	500,000^{*}
United States (RIAA) Mastertone	Gold	500,000^{*}
^{*} Sales figures based on certification alone.^{‡} Sales+streaming figures based on certification alone.

== Release history ==
Region	Date	Format(s)	Label(s)	Ref.
United States	November 15, 2004	Urban contemporary radio	G-Unit, Aftermath, Interscope	
