= Dreams (The Game song) =

Single by the Game

from the album The Documentary
- Released: May 28, 2005
- Recorded: 2004
- Genre: Hip hop; conscious hip hop
- Length: 4:46
- Label: Black Wall Street; G-Unit; Aftermath; Interscope
- Songwriters: Jayceon Taylor; Kanye West; Jerry Butler; Kenneth Gamble; Leon Huff
- Producer: Kanye West

The Game singles chronology
"Hate It or Love It" (2005)	"Dreams" (2005)	"Playa's Only" (2005)

Music video
- "Dreams" on YouTube

"Dreams" is a song by American rapper the Game, from his debut album, The Documentary. It was released as the fifth official single from the album in all territories except France, which saw "Higher" released there first. The song was produced by Kanye West and features a sample of "No Money Down" by soul music singer Jerry Butler. The song is dedicated to Yetunde Price (the elder half-sister of tennis stars Serena Williams and Venus Williams), who was shot dead on September 14, 2003; the Williamses also came from the Game's hometown of Compton, California. The lyrics cite the Dr. Dre album 2001 being released "in 2001", when it was actually released in 1999. The song was placed 5th on About.com's Best Hip-Hop Songs of 2005.

"Dreams" debuted at No. 97 and peaked at No. 32 on the Billboard Hot 100 and at No. 1 on the Hot R&B/Hip-Hop Songs chart. The single was also commercially successful in the United Kingdom, peaking at number 8 on the UK Singles Chart.

== Music video ==
The music video was directed by Phillip Atwell, and it features cameos by R&B singer and actress Mýa, Dr. Dre, veteran singer Jim Gilstrap and comedian Michael Colyar. It also features graffiti that memorializes the deceased artists and historical figures mentioned in the song.

== Tributes ==
- Aaliyah Dana Haughton (January 16, 1979 – August 25, 2001)
- Lisa Nicole Lopes (Left Eye) (May 27, 1971 – April 25, 2002)
- Jam Master Jay (January 21, 1965 – October 30, 2002)
- Yetunde Price (August 9, 1972 – September 14, 2003)
- Martin Luther King Jr. (January 15, 1929 – April 4, 1968)
- Tupac Shakur (June 16, 1971 – September 13, 1996)
- Huey Percy Newton (February 17, 1942 – August 22, 1989)
- Eric Lynn Wright (Eazy-E) (September 7, 1964 – March 26, 1995)
- Christopher Wallace (The Notorious B.I.G.) (May 21, 1972 – March 9, 1997)
- Marvin Gaye (April 2, 1939 – April 1, 1984)

== Remixes ==
A remix of the song was released on the Game's mixtape, You Know What It Is Vol. 3. It is a mix between "Dreams" and "A Dream", which is a track featuring the Notorious B.I.G. from Jay-Z's 2002 album The Blueprint 2: The Gift & The Curse. It combines a chopped and screwed version of B.I.G.'s a cappella verse on "A Dream" (which is Juicy's first verse) with the instrumental of "Dreams".

There is also another official remix of the song with Trey Songz in which Trey Songz sings the second verse.

An unreleased version of Dreams leaked onto the internet in October 2011. This version features similar lyrics to the final version with revised themes and content, with the Game reflecting on events in his own life as opposed to reflecting on the legacies left by rap legends. It leaked labeled as "Original Version".

== Track listing ==
=== Maxi single ===
1. "Dreams" (Album version)
2. "Dreams" (Live from Dublin)
3. "Dreams" (Instrumental)
4. "Dreams" (Video)

== Charts ==
=== Weekly charts ===
Chart (2005)	Peak position
Australia (ARIA)	42
Australian Urban (ARIA)	16
Belgium (Ultratip Bubbling Under Flanders)	67
Belgium (Ultratip Bubbling Under Wallonia)	39
European Hot 100 Singles (Billboard)	46
Germany (Media Control AG)	15
Ireland (IRMA)	11
Netherlands (Dutch Top 40 Tipparade)	11
Netherlands (Single Top 100)	37
New Zealand (Recorded Music NZ)	43
Scottish Singles Sales (Official Charts)	8
Switzerland (Schweizer Hitparade)	53
UK Singles (Official Charts)	8
UK Hip Hop/R&B (Official Charts)	3
US Billboard Hot 100	32
US Hot R&B/Hip-Hop Songs (Billboard)	12
US Hot Rap Songs (Billboard)	5
US Rhythmic Airplay (Billboard)	13

=== Year-end charts ===
Chart (2005)	Position
UK Singles (OCC)	146
UK Urban (Music Week)	37
US Hot R&B/Hip-Hop Songs (Billboard)	82

== Certifications ==
Region	Certification	Certified units/sales
New Zealand (RMNZ)	Gold	15,000^{‡}
United Kingdom (BPI)	Silver	200,000^{‡}
^{‡} Sales+streaming figures based on certification alone.
