= She's Got Game =

American reality television dating game show

- Genre: Reality
- Starring: The Game
- Country of origin: United States
- Original language: English
- No. of seasons: 1
- No. of episodes: 9

Production
- Running time: 60 minutes

Original release
- Network: VH1
- Release: August 10 – October 12, 2015

She's Got Game is an American reality television dating game show starring rapper The Game. The series premiered on August 10, 2015, on VH1.

In 2019, Priscilla Rainey, a contestant on the show, sued The Game of sexual assault. He was found guilty, and Rainey was awarded US$7,000,000 in damages, plus the royalties to his album Born 2 Rap. The Game's manager Wack 100 claimed that he owned all the royalties to the album, and that he doesn't owe her anything.

== Contestants ==
Name	Eliminated
Rebecca Silvera	Winner
Briona Mae	3rd
Priscilla Rainey	Episode 6
Jennifer Acosta	Episode 8
Brittany Brickner	Episode 6
Brittany Anderson	Episode 6
Shay Malca	Episode 5
Sierra Alston	Episode 5
Melissa Howe	Episode 4
Kiki Hall	Episode 3
Destinee	Episode 2

== Episodes ==
No.	Title	Original release date	US viewers (millions)
1	"Meeting the Game"	August 10, 2015	1.95
2	"Rollin' with the Game"	August 17, 2015	1.90
3	"The Heat Is On"	August 24, 2015	1.67
4	"Game Changer"	August 31, 2015	1.72
5	"What's Going Down"	September 7, 2015	1.56
6	"Sink or Swim"	September 14, 2015	1.52
7	"Surprise, Surprise"	September 28, 2015	1.58
8	"Mom Knows Best"	October 5, 2015	1.72
9	"Game Over"	October 12, 2015	N/A
