= MTV Video Music Award for Best Rap Video =

Annual music video award

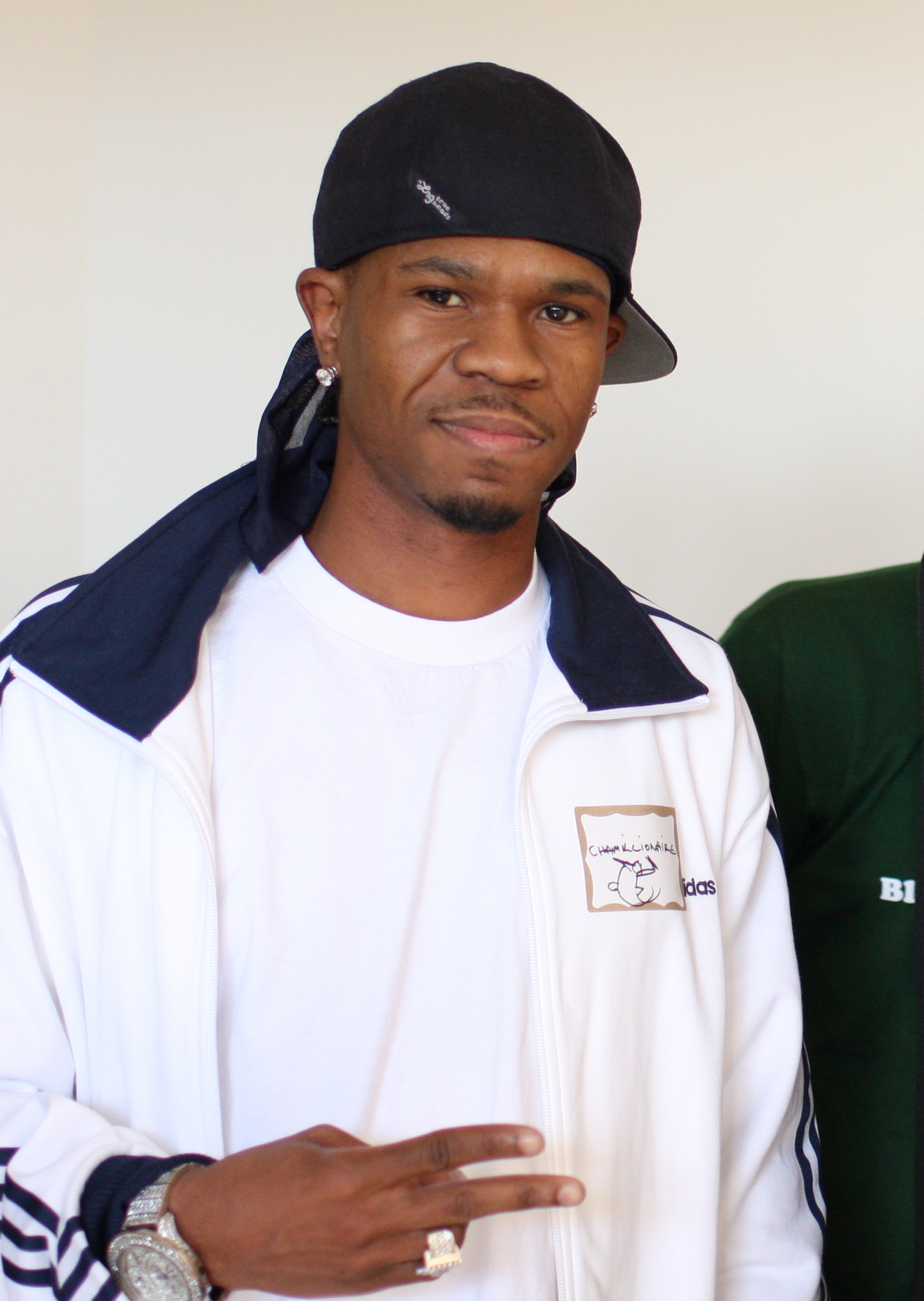
- "Ridin'" by Chamillionaire (pictured) featuring Krayzie Bone was the last recipient of this award.
- Awarded for: Rap music videos
- Country: United States
- Presented by: MTV
- First award: 1989
- Final award: 2006
- Currently held by: Chamillionaire (featuring Krayzie Bone) — "Ridin'" (2006)

Highlights
- Most wins: Arrested Development, Dr. Dre, Eminem, Jay-Z & Will Smith (2)
- Most nominations: Dr. Dre & Eminem (7)
- Website: VMA website

The MTV Video Music Award for Best Rap Video was first given out in 1989, and it was one of the four original genre categories added at the 1989 MTV Video Music Awards. This award was last given out in 2006, as MTV did not bring it back in 2008 like it did with other genre awards. Instead, artists and videos that were previously eligible for Best Rap Video are now eligible for Best Hip-Hop Video. Will Smith, Arrested Development, Dr. Dre, and Jay-Z are tied as this award's biggest winners, each having won it twice.

== Recipients ==
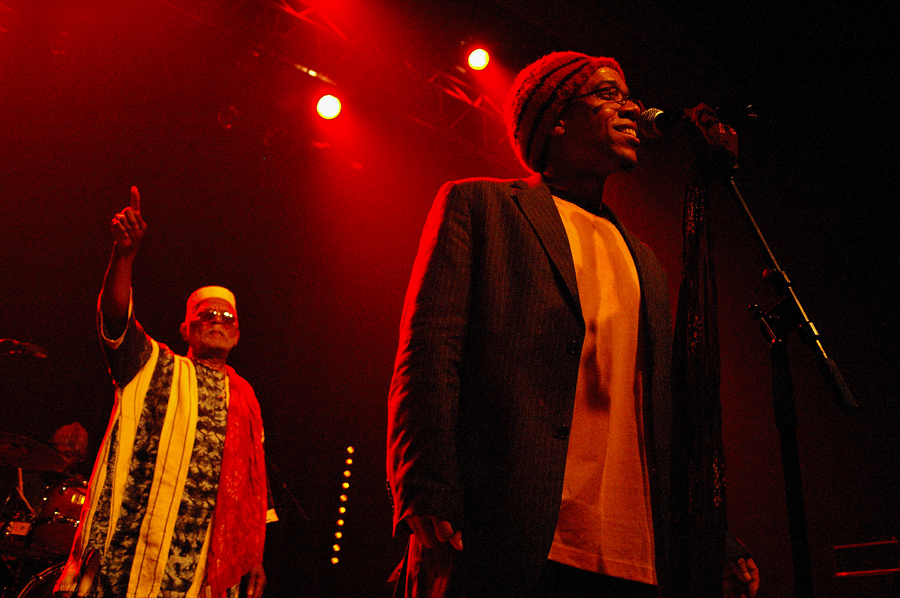
Two-time winner Arrested Development

Year	Winner	Other nominees	Ref.
1989	DJ Jazzy Jeff & The Fresh Prince — "Parents Just Don't Understand"	Ice-T — "Colors"; Kool Moe Dee — "How Ya Like Me Now"; MC Hammer — "Turn This Mutha Out"; Tone Lōc — "Wild Thing"	
1990	MC Hammer — "U Can't Touch This"	Digital Underground — "The Humpty Dance"; Biz Markie — "Just a Friend"; Young MC — "Principal's Office"	
1991	LL Cool J — "Mama Said Knock You Out"	3rd Bass — "Pop Goes the Weasel"; DJ Jazzy Jeff & The Fresh Prince — "Summertime"; Ice-T — "New Jack Hustler (Nino's Theme)"; Monie Love — "It's a Shame (My Sister)"	
1992	Arrested Development — "Tennessee"	Black Sheep — "The Choice Is Yours (Revisited)"; Kris Kross — "Jump"; Marky Mark and the Funky Bunch — "Good Vibrations"; Sir Mix-a-Lot — "Baby Got Back"	
1993	Arrested Development — "People Everyday"	Digable Planets — "Rebirth of Slick (Cool Like Dat)"; Dr. Dre — "Nuthin' but a 'G' Thang"; Naughty by Nature — "Hip Hop Hooray"	
1994	Snoop Doggy Dogg — "Doggy Dogg World"	Coolio — "Fantastic Voyage"; Cypress Hill — "Insane in the Brain"; Dr. Dre — "Let Me Ride"	
1995	Dr. Dre — "Keep Their Heads Ringin'"	Brandy (featuring MC Lyte, Queen Latifah and Yo-Yo) — "I Wanna Be Down"; Da Bush Babees — "Remember We"; Craig Mack — "Flava in Ya Ear"; Public Enemy — "Give It Up"; Rappin' 4-Tay (featuring The Spinners) — "I'll Be Around"	
1996	Coolio (featuring L.V.) — "Gangsta's Paradise"	Bone Thugs-n-Harmony — "Tha Crossroads"; LL Cool J — "Doin' It"; 2Pac (featuring Dr. Dre and Roger Troutman) — "California Love"	
1997	The Notorious B.I.G. — "Hypnotize"	Blackstreet (featuring Dr. Dre) — "No Diggity"; Dr. Dre — "Been There, Done That"; Missy Elliott — "The Rain (Supa Dupa Fly)"	
1998	Will Smith — "Gettin' Jiggy wit It"	Busta Rhymes — "Put Your Hands Where My Eyes Could See"; Master P (featuring Fiend, Silkk the Shocker, Mia X and Mystikal) — "Make 'Em Say Uhh!"; The Notorious B.I.G. (featuring Puff Daddy and Mase) — "Mo Money Mo Problems"; Pras (featuring Ol' Dirty Bastard and Mýa) — "Ghetto Supastar (That Is What You Are)"	
1999	Jay-Z (featuring Ja Rule and Amil) — "Can I Get A..."	2Pac — "Changes"; DMX — "Ruff Ryders' Anthem"; Nas (featuring Puff Daddy) — "Hate Me Now"	
2000	Dr. Dre (featuring Eminem) — "Forgot About Dre"	DMX — "Party Up"; Eminem — "The Real Slim Shady"; Eve (featuring Faith Evans) — "Love Is Blind"; Jay-Z (featuring UGK) — "Big Pimpin'"	
2001	Nelly — "Ride wit Me"	Eminem (featuring Dido) — "Stan"; Ja Rule (featuring Lil' Mo and Vita) — "Put It on Me"; Jay-Z — "I Just Wanna Love U (Give It 2 Me)"; Snoop Dogg (featuring Master P, Nate Dogg, Butch Cassidy and Tha Eastsidaz) — "Lay Low"	
2002	Eminem — "Without Me"	DMX — "Who We Be"; Ludacris (featuring Sleepy Brown) — "Saturday (Oooh Oooh!)"; Nas — "One Mic"; P. Diddy (featuring Black Rob and Mark Curry) — "Bad Boy for Life"	
2003	50 Cent — "In da Club"	2Pac (featuring Nas) — "Thugz Mansion"; Eminem — "Lose Yourself"; Ludacris (featuring Mystikal) — "Move"; Nas — "I Can"	
2004	Jay-Z — "99 Problems"	50 Cent (featuring Snoop Dogg and G-Unit) — "P.I.M.P. (remix)"; D12 — "My Band"; Lil Jon and The East Side Boyz (featuring Ying Yang Twins) — "Get Low"; Ludacris (featuring Shawnna) — "Stand Up"	
2005	Ludacris — "Number One Spot"	Eminem — "Just Lose It"; The Game (featuring 50 Cent) — "Hate It or Love It"; T.I. — "U Don't Know Me"; Ying Yang Twins — "Wait (The Whisper Song)"	
2006	Chamillionaire (featuring Krayzie Bone) — "Ridin'"	50 Cent — "Window Shopper"; Busta Rhymes (featuring Mary J. Blige, Rah Digga, Missy Elliott, Lloyd Banks, Papoose, and DMX) — "Touch It (Remix)"; T.I. — "What You Know"; Yung Joc (featuring Nitti) — "It's Goin' Down"	

== Statistics ==
=== Artists with multiple wins ===
2 wins

- Arrested Development
- Dr. Dre
- Eminem (Note: 1 as a featured artist.)
- Jay-Z
- Will Smith (Note: 1 with DJ Jazzy Jeff & The Fresh Prince.)

=== Artists with multiple nominations ===
7 nominations

- Dr. Dre (Note: 2 as a featured artist.)
- Eminem (Note: 1 as a featured artist; 1 with D12.)

4 nominations

- 50 cent (Note: 1 as a featured artist.)
- DMX (Note: 1 as a featured artist.)
- Jay-Z
- Ludacris
- Nas (Note: 1 as a featured artist.)

3 nominations

- 2Pac
- Puff Daddy (Note: 2 as a featured artist.; A.K.A. P. Diddy)
- Snoop Dogg (Note: 1 as a featured artist.)
- Will Smith (Note: 2 with DJ Jazzy Jeff & The Fresh Prince.)

2 nominations

- Arrested Development
- Busta Rhymes
- Coolio
- DJ Jazzy Jeff & The Fresh Prince
- Ice-T
- Ja Rule (Note: 1 as a featured artist.)
- LL Cool J
- Master P (Note: 1 as a featured artist.)
- MC Hammer
- Missy Elliott (Note: 1 as a featured artist.)
- Mystikal (Note: Both as a featured artist.)
- The Notorious B.I.G.
- T.I.
- Ying Yang Twins (Note: 1 as a featured artist.)

== See also ==
- MTV Europe Music Award for Best Rap
