= The Family Circle =

Canadian television series

- Genre: documentary
- Presented by: Polly MacKay-Smith
- Country of origin: Canada
- Original language: English
- No. of seasons: 1
- No. of episodes: 10

Production
- Producer: Patrick Watson

Original release
- Network: CBC Television
- Release: 7 April – 9 June 1957

The Family Circle is a Canadian documentary television series that aired on CBC Television in 1957.

== Premise ==
This series concerned the lives of children, using productions from Crawley Films, the National Film Board of Canada and United World Films. Polly MacKay-Smith hosted the films which were accompanied by a panel discussion involving teachers and parents.

== Scheduling ==
This half-hour series was broadcast on Sundays at 3:00 p.m. (Eastern) from 7 April to 9 June 1957.

== Episodes ==
- 7 April 1957: this episode argues the emotional requirements of children as they develop
- 14 April 1957: this episode featured the development patterns and playing behaviour of children 15 and under
- 21 April 1957: "The Terrible Twos and Trusting Threes" (Crawley Films)
- 28 April 1957: "The Frustrating Fours and Fascinating Fives" (Crawley Films)
- 5 May 1957: "From Sociable Six to Noisy Nines" (Crawley Films)
- 12 May 1957: "Why Won't Tommy Eat?" (Crawley Films)
- 19 May 1957: "From Ten To Twelve" (Crawley Films)
- 26 May 1957: "The Teens" (Crawley Films)
- 2 June 1957: "Shyness" (NFB)
- 9 June 1957: "Family Circles" - this episode features the relationship between school and home and its effect on child development
