= Sean Higgins (basketball) =

American basketball player (born 1968)

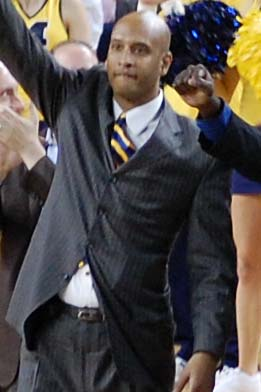

Personal information
- Born: December 30, 1968 (age 57) Detroit, Michigan, U.S.
- Listed height: 6 ft 9 in (2.06 m)
- Listed weight: 240 lb (109 kg)

Career information
- High school: Fairfax (Los Angeles, California)
- College: Michigan (1987–1990)
- NBA draft: 1990: 2nd round, 54th overall pick
- Drafted by: San Antonio Spurs
- Playing career: 1990–2002
- Position: Small forward
- Number: 3, 15, 9, 19, 24
- Coaching career: 2003–2012

Career history

Playing
- 1990–1991: San Antonio Spurs
- 1992: Orlando Magic
- 1993: Golden State Warriors
- 1993–1994: Aris Thessaloniki
- 1994–1995: New Jersey Nets
- 1995–1996: Philadelphia 76ers
- 1996–1997: Ülkerspor Istanbul
- 1997: Portland Trail Blazers
- 1997–1998: Grand Rapids Hoops
- 1998: Iraklio Crete
- 1998–1999: Cocodrilos de Caracas
- 1999–2000: Ural Great Perm
- 2000–2001: Detroit Dogs

Coaching
- 2003–2004: Fresno Heatwave
- 2005–2006: Inglewood Cobras
- 2006–2007: Albany Patroons
- 2009–2012: Edmonds CC

Career highlights
- NCAA champion (1989); McDonald's All-American (1987); Second-team Parade All-American (1987); Third-team Parade All-American (1986)

Career NBA statistics
- Points: 1,375 (6.3 ppg)
- Rebounds: 402 (1.8 rpg)
- Assists: 226 (1.0 apg)
- Stats at NBA.com
- Stats at Basketball Reference

Sean Marielle Higgins (born December 30, 1968) is an American former professional basketball player. He played college basketball for Michigan, whom he helped win the 1989 national championship. He hit the winning basket in the Final Four against Illinois to propel Michigan into the championship game versus Seton Hall.

== Early life ==
Higgins' father is Earle Higgins, a player for the ABA Indiana Pacers.

== High school ==
Higgins attended Fairfax High School in Los Angeles. In Higgins' sophomore season in 1985, Fairfax had been the city 3A champion, and Sean was named Los Angeles player of the year at 15 years of age. In his Junior and senior seasons, Sean was the number one ranked high school player in California. In the 1986-87 season, Fairfax became ranked number 1 in California and number 2 in the USA today national poll. Fairfax was the Los Angeles City CIF 4A champion in 1987. The team would lose to the eventual state champion, Mater Dei, in the state playoff. Higgins was a McDonald's All-American in 1987 and Parade All-America Boys Basketball Team in 1986 (third team) and 1987 (second team).

== College ==
Higgins was highly recruited while in high school. Higgins had narrowed his choices between Michigan and UCLA. His signing became controversial from the outset, when it had been reported that he had signed a letter of intent to go to UCLA on November 19, 1986. His father reported that he had been under duress. By February 1987, a Sports Illustrated report outlined the allegations, that his stepfather had coerced him to sign for UCLA. Furthermore, he had been offered enticements by a UCLA alumnus stockbroker, and could live in the chauffeur's quarters where UCLA player Reggie Miller had lived. UCLA coach Walt Hazzard was quoted, "(Higgins) doesn’t know what he’s doing. [He said] Sean is taking on some very powerful people." Higgins was released from his letter of intent to UCLA in March 1987. The NCAA conducted an investigation into the recruiting at UCLA. Higgins joined Rumeal Robinson and Terry Mills in coach Bill Frieder's 1987-88 season for Michigan. Ultimately, UCLA lost scholarships over the recruiting violation.

== Professional career ==
=== Player ===
Higgins was selected by the San Antonio Spurs of the 1990 NBA draft, and played for the Spurs, Orlando Magic, Golden State Warriors, New Jersey Nets, Philadelphia 76ers and Portland Trail Blazers in eight NBA seasons. He also played overseas in several countries.

=== Coach ===
In 2004 Higgins became General Manager and Head Coach of the Fresno Heatwave of the American Basketball Association. Higgins was hired as the Edmonds Community College, Edmonds, Washington head basketball coach from 2009 to 2012.

=== Business interests ===
As of 2026, Higgins is the director of Sean Higgins Basketball Camps, which specialize in basketball player development and exposure for amateur athletes. Higgins is also founder and CEO of Royal Eagle Holdings Ltd, a sports & entertainment, technology, healthcare and real estate investment company. In addition, he is founder of “The Sean M. Higgins Charity Group Ltd” a non-profit organization focusing on empowerment, education and support in health and wellness, and youth sports development throughout the United States of America.
