= Stop Snitchin, Stop Lyin =

Stop Snitchin–Stop Lyin

Mixtape by the Game
- Released: December 3, 2005 (U.S.)
- Recorded: September – December 2005
- Genre: Gangsta rap
- Length: 78:32
- Label: BWS
- Producer: Reviews =

The Game chronology
Ghost Unit (2005)	Stop Snitchin–Stop Lyin (2005)	G.A.M.E. (2006)

Stop Snitchin–Stop Lyin is the sixth mixtape album/DVD by rapper the Game. It features artists like Lil' Kim, Ice Cube, E-40, Chingy, WC, Paul Wall and others.

== Certification ==
In 2006 the mixtape was certified platinum in Ireland, which sold 15,000 units and the DVD was also certified gold.

== Track listing ==
No.	Title	Instrumental/Producer(s)	Length
1.	"Intro"		1:34
2.	"We Are the Champions"	"Stay Fly" by Three 6 Mafia	2:02
3.	"120"	"Hustler's Ambition" by 50 Cent	8:54
4.	"Stop Talking to the Cops"	"Window Shopper" by 50 Cent	4:39
5.	"Niggaz Bleed" (featuring Techniec)	"Niggas Bleed" by the Notorious B.I.G.	3:45
6.	"1970 Sumthin'" (The Notorious B.I.G. featuring the Game)	Dre & Vidal	3:24
7.	"G-Unit Crip" (featuring Techniec)	"Ms. New Booty" by Bubba Sparxxx	4:48
8.	"Beach Boy" (featuring Techniec)		3:21
9.	"Not Gunna Leave" (featuring Trae tha Truth and Paul Wall)	"I Don't Think So" by Kam (rapper)	3:24
10.	"Above the Rim in Farmington, CT" (skit)		0:36
11.	"Freeze" (performed by Eastwood)	Nu Jerzey Devil	3:48
12.	"AM to PM" (performed by Cyserro)	"A.M. To P.M." by Cassidy	2:03
13.	"My Lowrider" (featuring Techniec, E-40, Crooked I, Chingy, Lil Rob, Paul Wall, WC and Ice Cube)	Chopz	5:19
14.	"Gayo" (Interlude)	"I Like to Move It" by Reel 2 Real	1:25
15.	"Bounce Back" (performed by Charli Baltimore)	Nu Jerzey Devil	2:26
16.	"Quiet" (Lil' Kim featuring the Game)		3:57
17.	"All I Need"	"Blaze a 50" by Nas	2:25
18.	"I Told You"	"Mentally Disturbed" by the D.O.C.	3:31
19.	"Buckest" (featuring 615)		5:58
20.	"Outro (Red Bandana)"	"Bandana" by Juelz Santana	6:39
Total length:			1:13:50
