= Westside Story (song) =

Single by Game featuring 50 Cent

from the album The Documentary
- Released: September 7, 2004
- Recorded: 2004
- Studio: Can-Am Studios (Tarzana, Los Angeles); Record One (Sherman Oaks, Los Angeles)
- Genre: West Coast hip hop; gangsta rap
- Length: 4:23
- Label: Black Wall Street; G-Unit; Aftermath; Interscope
- Songwriters: Jayceon Taylor, Mike Elizondo, Curtis Jackson, Scott Storch, Andre Young Marshall Mathers
- Producers: Dr. Dre, Scott Storch

The Game singles chronology
"Certified Gangstas (Remix)" (2004)	"Westside Story" (2004)	"How We Do" (2004)

50 Cent singles chronology
"Let Me In" (2004)	"Westside Story" (2004)	"Encore/Curtains Down" (2004)

"Westside Story" is the debut single by American rapper and West Coast hip hop artist the Game. The song was produced by both Dr. Dre and Scott Storch, and was co-written by Mike Elizondo, Dre, Storch, the Game and 50 Cent. It was released in 2004 as the lead single from Game's debut studio album The Documentary. The song debuted at #99 and peaked at #93 on the Billboard Hot 100. It was an airplay-only release, thus no music video for the song was made. Rolling Stone's review of the album described this song as "a kind of L.A. version of "In da Club". The Game has stated that this song is a tribute to Tupac Shakur, with a direct reference to him, saying "I got +California Love+ fuckin' bitches to that Pac shit." The Game also makes references to Tupac's songs, California Love and Against All Odds. Other references include: Nate Dogg, Tha Dogg Pound (D.P.G.) and their song New York, Westside Connection, Michael Jackson and his album Thriller, DJ Pooh and Kool G Rap.

== Background and recording ==
"Westside Story" was the first song The Game and Dr. Dre recorded together. The Game had begun writing the song (without a chorus) in 2002 for the soundtrack to the film All About the Benjamins; however, Dr. Dre felt the song would be better suited as the opening song on The Documentary.

== Chart performance ==
The song debuted at No. 99 on the Billboard Hot 100. It remained at that position the following week, before falling off the chart. It then re-entered the chart the following week at No. 98, before peaking at No. 93 the week after. After peaking, it fell off the chart completely.

== Remixes ==
- 2005: "Westside Story" (Alternate Version) (featuring Snoop Dogg)
- 2005: "Westside Story" (Remix) (featuring 50 Cent & Daz Dillinger)

== Track listing ==
=== A-side ===
1. "Westside Story" (Clean)

=== B-side ===
1. "Westside Story" (Album)
2. "Westside Story" (Instrumental)

== Charts ==
Chart (2004–05)	Peak position
US Billboard Hot 100	93
US Hot R&B/Hip-Hop Songs (Billboard)	55

== Certifications ==
Region	Certification	Certified units/sales
New Zealand (RMNZ)	Gold	15,000^{‡}
^{‡} Sales+streaming figures based on certification alone.
