= Christina Milian discography =

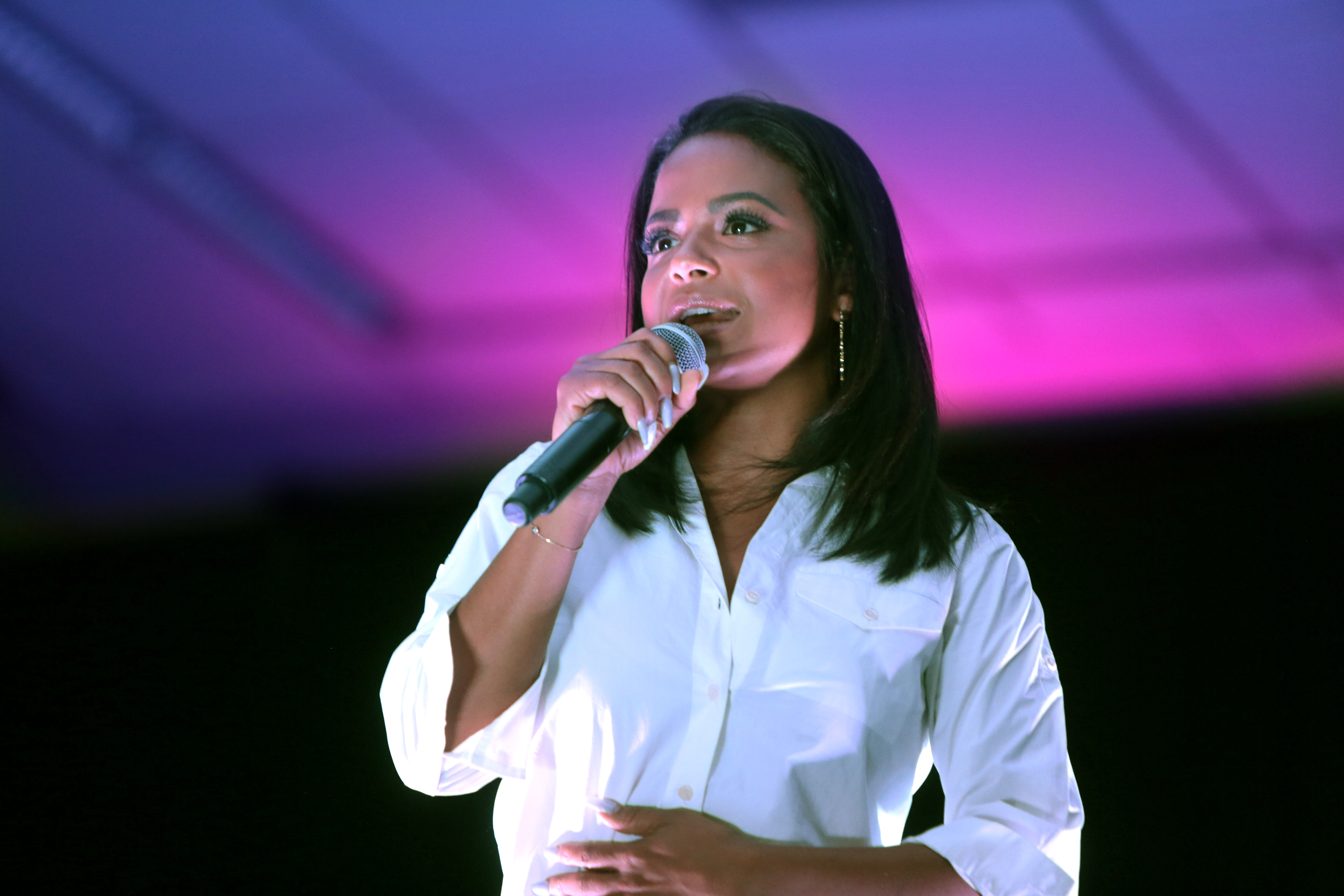
- Studio albums: 3
- Extended plays: 1
- Soundtrack albums: 3
- Compilation albums: 2
- Singles: 8
- Music videos: 19

Christina Milian is an American R&B and pop singer. She has released three studio albums, an extended play (EP), six singles and two compilation albums, in addition to 19 music videos.

Milian's self-titled debut album was released in 2001, and features the singles "AM to PM" and "When You Look at Me"; both peaked in the top three on the UK Singles Chart. The singer's second studio album, It's About Time (2004), provided her first major US hit "Dip It Low". The single peaked at number two in the UK and number five in the US, and was certified Gold by the RIAA for digital sales. Milian's third studio album, So Amazin' (2006), produced only one single, "Say I".

A month after the release of So Amazin', Milian's representative confirmed that she had left Island Def Jam Music Group due to "creative differences". After leaving Island Records, a greatest hits compilation, The Best of Christina Milian, was released in 2006 solely in Japan. Milian signed with Myspace Records and worked on her fourth album Dream in Color. A single was released in October 2008, ballad "Us Against the World". In 2009, whilst working with The-Dream, Milian left Myspace and signed to Interscope Records through The-Dream's Radiokilla Records. Producer Tricky Stewart confirmed that Milian had rebooted the album and a new single, yet to be decided, would be the first from the album. The album was renamed Elope. In 2012, following her public divorce from The-Dream, Milian announced that she had signed a new deal with Young Money Entertainment, under Lil Wayne's guidance, she resumed recording the album confirming that some previously recorded material may still appear on the album.

== Albums ==
=== Studio albums ===
List of studio albums, with selected chart positions, sales figures and certifications
Title	Album details	Peak chart positions							Sales	Certifications
Title	Album details	US	FRA	GER	JPN	NLD	SWI	UK	Sales	Certifications
Christina Milian	Released: January; 23, 2002; Label: Def Soul; Format: CD, digital download	—	138	51	19	36	98	23	UK: 101,986	BPI: Gold; RIAJ: Gold
It's About Time	Released: June 15, 2004; Label: Island; Format: CD, digital download	14	83	55	11	66	35	21	US: 382,000; UK: 63,708	BPI: Silver; RIAJ: Gold
So Amazin'	Released: May 16, 2006; Label: Island; Format: CD, digital download	11	139	—	9	—	55	67	US: 163,000	

=== Compilation albums ===
List of compilation albums, with selected chart positions
Title	Album details	Peak chart positions					
Title	Album details	US	US R&B	US Rap	CAN	JPN	UK
Best Of	Released: November 22, 2006; Label: Island; Format: CD, digital download	—	—	—	—	29	—
Young Money: Rise of an Empire (as part of Young Money Entertainment)	Released: March 11, 2014; Label: Young Money, Cash Money, Republic; Format: CD, digital download	7	4	2	24	—	148

== Extended plays ==
Title	EP details
4U	Released: December 4, 2015; Label: Milianheiress Music; Format: Digital download

== Singles ==
=== As lead artist ===
List of singles, with selected chart positions and certifications, showing year released and album name
Title	Year	Peak chart positions										Certifications	Album
Title	Year	US	AUS	AUT	GER	IRE	NLD	NZ	SWE	SWI	UK	Certifications	Album
"AM to PM"	2001	27	25	—	59	6	8	—	16	28	3	BPI: Silver	Christina Milian
"When You Look at Me"	2002	—	7	13	13	5	3	—	16	31	3	ARIA: Gold; BPI: Silver	Christina Milian
"Dip It Low" (solo or featuring Fabolous or Samy Deluxe)	2004	5	31	32	17	11	7	3	30	11	2	RIAA: Gold; BPI: Gold; RMNZ: Gold	It's About Time
"Whatever U Want" (featuring Joe Budden)	2004	100	—	62	51	16	20	—	—	27	9		It's About Time
"Say I" (featuring Young Jeezy)	2006	21	45	64	38	15	74	23	—	23	4		So Amazin'
"Us Against the World"	2008	—	—	—	—	—	—	—	—	—	112		—N/a
"—" denotes a title that did not chart, or was not released in that territory.

=== As featured artist ===
List of singles, with selected chart positions and certifications, showing year released and album name
Title	Year	Peak chart positions						Certifications	Album
Title	Year	US	US Dance	AUS	IRE	NLD	UK	Certifications	Album
"Between Me and You" (Ja Rule featuring Christina Milian)	2000	11	—	—	—	48	26		Rule 3:36
"It's All Gravy" (Romeo featuring Christina Milian)	2002	—	—	—	32	—	9		Solid Love
"Look Around" (Bratz featuring Christina Milian and Verbal)	2003	—	—	—	—	—	—		—N/a
"Memory" (The Jackie Boyz featuring Christina Milian)	2011	—	—	—	—	—	—		Songs in My Blackberry
"Hello" (Stafford Brothers featuring Lil Wayne and Christina Milian)	2012	—	11	4	—	—	—	ARIA: 2× Platinum	—N/a
"Start a Fire" (Lil Wayne featuring Christina Milian)	2014	—	—	—	—	—	—		Tha Carter V
"—" denotes releases that did not chart or were not released in that country.

=== Promotional singles ===
List of promotional singles, showing year released and album name
Title	Year	Album
"Get Away" (featuring Ja Rule)	2001	Christina Milian
"Spending Time" (featuring Charli Baltimore)	2002	Christina Milian
"L.O.V.E." (featuring Joe Budden)	2004	It's About Time
"Gonna Tell Everybody"	2006	So Amazin'
"Rebel"	2015	4U
"We Ain't Worried"	2015	Non-album single
"Your Story" (with Terrence Green)	2022	Step Up

== Other appearances ==
Year	Song	Album	Notes
2001	"Call Me, Beep Me (The Kim Possible Theme Song)"	Kim Possible soundtrack	
2001	"You Make Me Laugh"	Rush Hour 2 soundtrack	Also appears on Milian's debut album
2002	"I Heard Santa on the Radio"	Santa Claus Lane	Performed with Hilary Duff
2002	"The Answer"	One Piece	
2005	"Ain't No Reason"	Be Cool soundtrack	
2005	"Believer"	Be Cool soundtrack	
2005	"Be What It's Gonna Be"	In the Mix soundtrack	
2005	"Don't Wanna Lose Your Love"	Lethal Weapon April 2005	Performed with Twista
2008	"Lock Him Down"	Gem-In-I	Performed with Ak'Sent
2009	"I Gotta Get to You"	Bring It On: Fight to the Finish	
2013	"Wired"	Lipstick & Pistols	Performed with Lola Monroe

== Writing credits ==
Year	Song	Artist	Album	Notes
2001	"Play"	Jennifer Lopez	J.Lo	Also performs background vocals
2001	"Same Ol' Same Ol'"	P.Y.T.	PYT (Down with Me)	
2003	"Sag Es/Listen to Me"	Samajona	Spurwechsel	Co-writer of the English version of "Sag Es": "Listen to Me"
2006	"Walk Away (Remember Me)"	Paula DeAnda	Paula DeAnda	Co-writer
2010	"Baby"	Justin Bieber	My World 2.0	Co-writer

== Music videos ==
Year	Song	Director(s)
2000	"Between Me and You"	Dave Meyers
2001	"AM to PM"	Dave Meyers
2001	"When You Look at Me"	Billie Woodruff
2001	"It's All Gravy"	
2002	"Get Away"	Little X
2002	"The Answer"	
2004	"Dip It Low"	Matthew Rolston
2004	"Whatever U Want"	Ray Kay
2006	"Say I"	Ray Kay
2009	"Us Against the World"	Ray Kay
2009	"I Gotta Get to You"	Billie Woodruff
2013	"Tapout"	Hannah Lux Davis
2013	"Hello"	Yasha Malekzad
2015	"Rebel"	Alton Glass
2015	"We Ain't Worried"	Mikel Monroe
2015	"Do It"	Stephen Garnett
2015	"Like Me"	Mike Ho
2015	"Liar"	
2022	"Your Story"	
