= It's About Time (Christina Milian album) =

Studio album by Christina Milian
- Released: March 24, 2004
- Recorded: 2002–2004
- Studios: Atlantis (Los Angeles); B-Rad (Los Angeles); Darkchild (Los Angeles); DARP (Atlanta); Majestic (Los Angeles); Metrophonic (London); Murlyn (Stockholm); Music Lab (Austin); Pool House (Los Angeles); Record Plant (Los Angeles); Sony (New York); Westlake (Los Angeles)
- Genres: R&B; pop; hip hop
- Length: 47:26
- Label: Island
- Producers: Bloodshy & Avant; Bradley & Stereo; Gregory Bruno; Fontez Camp; Warryn Campbell; Bryan-Michael Cox; Jasper Da Fatso; Jazz Nixon; Rodney Jerkins; Poli Paul; Jason Perry; Cory Rooney; Mark Taylor; Ez Tommy

Christina Milian chronology
Christina Milian (2002)	It's About Time (2004)	So Amazin' (2006)

Singles from It's About Time
- 1. "Dip It Low" Released: March 17, 2004; 2. "Whatever U Want" Released: September 14, 2004

It's About Time is the second studio album by American singer Christina Milian. It was released on March 24, 2004, by Island Records.

It's About Time served as Milian's debut in the US; the September 11 attacks occurred two weeks prior to the scheduled release of her eponymous debut studio album, and after its cancellation, Milian opted to record a new album for the market. For the production of the album, Milian worked with Bloodshy & Avant, Rodney "Darkchild" Jerkins, Cory Rooney, Warryn Campbell, Bryan-Michael Cox and Poli Paul. Milian received writing credit for seven songs on the album, often basing them on personal experiences. The style and sound of the album was compared to Beyoncé and Jennifer Lopez by several critics.

Upon release, It's About Time received mixed reviews from music critics, with up-tempo tracks being acclaimed and balladry facing criticism. The album peaked at number 14 on the US Billboard 200, with first-week sales of 55,000 units. At the 47th Annual Grammy Awards, it was nominated for Best Contemporary R&B Album. The album's lead single "Dip It Low" became Milian's most successful to date, peaking at number five on the US Billboard Hot 100 and within the top 10 in numerous European countries. The second single "Whatever U Want" was less successful, peaking at number nine in the UK.

== Background and development ==
Milian's eponymous debut album was released outside North America in January 2002. However, its domestic release was postponed due to the September 11 attacks, which had occurred just two weeks before its scheduled release date. After the international release, Milian went back into the recording studio. The singer felt that music trends had changed into rock music, hardcore hip hop and tribute songs, and her music did not fall into those categories. Milian decided to stop recording and toured overseas for a year and a half. When she returned to the US, she decided not to release Christina Milian domestically, and started working on It's About Time instead.

== Production and composition ==
Milian traveled the world to record the album, working with the popular producers of the time. The album featured production from Bloodshy & Avant, "Darkchild", Cory Rooney, Warryn Campbell, Bryan-Michael Cox and Poli Paul. Basing her lyrics on past personal experiences, Milian wrote seven songs on the album. Milian later explained that she wrote what she thought other people would like, rather than writing for herself and what she liked. When promoting the album, Milian said that she was excited about the album because she had matured since her last album, and it was "nice for people to see this change".

Discussing the change of genre between her lead singles, Milian said that the "first single off my last album, 'AM to PM', was more of a kiddie kind of thing, very pop. [Dip It Low] is more R&B, kind of a club/party kind of vibe." An issue Milian had with the album was that it did not flow. The various pop and urban influences in that album, she found, confused the audience. For her next studio album, Milian said that she wanted a more consistent feel.

For "Dip It Low"'s music video, Milian danced in a bed of black paint. Milian explained that body art was common in the 1960s: "they would dip in paint and they would roll around on a canvas and make art on the canvas. So I kind of 'dip' in the paint and do the same thing." The song's lyrics are about putting an effort into the relationship as a female: "if you wanna be a little more sexy, you gotta dip it low". Several years after the release of It's About Time, Milian admitted that her new image for "Dip It Low" and the whole album was mainly for shock value. She had to make her way back into the US market, and by choosing a sexier image, she made a name for herself. "Dip It Low" was also meant to show that she was not the same eighteen-year-old girl in the "AM to PM" video. To create her new image, Milian also decided to change her appearance and lightened her hair. Taking inspiration from Janet Jackson who constantly changed her image, Milian thought to herself, "'When did I like Janet Jackson the most?' It was when she had her lightened hair."

The style and sound of the album was compared to that of Beyoncé, Paula Abdul and Jennifer Lopez by several critics, as well as Britney Spears, Aaliyah and Ashanti. After several comparisons to Beyoncé Knowles in regards to appearance, Milian said "I think she is a lovely artist, very talented but the only reason I changed my color hair is because I was getting bored of my same old look and I wanted to do something different." Elysa Gardner of USA Today found that with Milian's "slight, sweet vocals and blithe, breezy pop-soul sensibility", the genre of the album was more pop than R&B. Andy Kellman of Allmusic described "Dip It Low" as "a clever and ubiquitous slice of high-class raunch", and compared the album's sound to both Beyoncé's "Dangerously in Love" and Jennifer Lopez's "This Is Me... Then". Eric R. Danton of the Milwaukee Journal Sentinel said "Dip It Low" had the "plinking of an unusual Far Eastern-sounding stringed instrument", and "Whatever U Want" "rolls on a bass-and-drum combo". Danton found the rest of the album to be "simply bland padding, with plodding, canned beats and half-hearted hooks".

== Critical reception ==
Professional ratings
Review scores
Source	Rating
AllMusic	3/5 stars
Entertainment Weekly	D
People	2.5/4 stars
Rolling Stone	2/5 stars
Slant Magazine	2/5 stars
USA Today	2/4 stars
Yahoo! Music UK	6/10

The album received mixed reviews among critics. Jim Farber of Entertainment Weekly felt that the songs from It's About Time "sound like they fell off a Paula Abdul album". Farber criticized the lyricists for writing "so many cliches", and said that Milian's voice "suggests a slightly more forceful version of Janet Jackson's pant". Farber gave the album a "D". Sal Cinquemani of Slant Magazine said that while It's About Time was "certainly not the worst album of the year", it was "pretty damn crappy". The reviewer enjoyed "Whatever U Want", "I'm Sorry" and "Get Loose", which he said "contribute some guilty pleasure ear candy". Eric Danton of the Milwaukee Journal Sentinel found the album "suffers from the same problem afflicting most major-label albums dumped on the market by an industry desperate for quick cash — It's About Time features one hit single, a couple of lesser tracks and a lot of filler." Danton felt that the only hit from It's About Time was "Dip It Low", while "Whatever U Want" and "L.O.V.E." were the album's lesser tracks. Danton praised Milian's vocal talent, but said that ultimately, "the lackluster material [...] rarely gives her a chance to shine".

Andy Kellman of Allmusic praised the club tracks, feeling that they "work best and easily outrank the slower songs". Kellman called "Dip It Low" the biggest highlight of the album, but said that despite the album's "handful of bright spots", Milian "will need to be more convincing during the ballads next time out in order to be considered a true force." Kelefa Sanneh of The New York Times said that although "Dip It Low" was one of the summer's most popular songs, the album included an even better song, "I Need More". Sanneh explained that Milian "breathes a serpentine melody over a beat that consists of jagged snippets: some guitar chugging, a few handclaps, a couple of strategically placed beeps and, in the chorus, an unexpected nose-diving bass line." Contrary to the views of other critics, Barry Walters of Rolling Stone said that although the ballads were "gooey", "the love songs work better than the dance tracks". Etta James of People believed that Milian struggled to find her own musical identity on the "fun but formulaic CD". James praised the "sexy booty bumper" "Dip It Low" for its "reggae-ish bass groove, a hypnotic Middle Eastern refrain", and called Fabolous' rap "perfectly chilled". The reviewer thought "Highway", the album's "most erotically charged track", sounded like a female answer to R. Kelly's "Ignition". While James found the album's most personal song, "Oh Daddy", to be the unsuccessful, she said that at least "it gives us a glimpse into the real Christina".

== Commercial performance ==
It's About Time was released in the US on June 15, 2004; it debuted and peaked at number 14 on the US Billboard 200 selling 55,000 copies in its first week, eventually selling 382,000 copies overall as of April 2006. The album also peaked at number five on the Top R&B/Hip-Hop Albums chart. Internationally, the album peaked at number 35 on the Swiss Albums Chart, 55 on the German Albums Chart, and 66 on the Dutch Albums Chart. In the UK, the album peaked at number 21, selling a total of 63,708 copies, and achieving Silver certification by the British Phonographic Industry. The album received a Grammy Award nomination for "Best Contemporary R&B Album" in 2005. To promote her album, Milian performed as an opening act on the Usher and Kanye West tour. The album's first single, "Dip It Low", became Milian's biggest hit to date, reaching number two in the UK and number five in the US. The single was certified Gold by the RIAA for digital sales, and earned a Grammy Award nomination for "Best Rap/Sung Collaboration". The album's second and final single, "Whatever U Want" featuring Joe Budden, reached the top ten in the UK.

== Track listing ==
It's About Time
No.	Title	Writer(s)	Producer(s)	Length
1.	"Intro"	Christina Milian; Paul Poli; Shawn Carter; Chris Martin	Poli	1:05
2.	"Dip It Low" (featuring Fabolous)	Poli; Teedra Moses; John Jackson	Poli	3:38
3.	"I Need More"	Sean Garrett; Christian Karlsson; Pontus Winnberg; Henrik Jonback	Bloodshy & Avant	3:17
4.	"Whatever U Want" (featuring Joe Budden)	Bradley Spalter; Lambert Waldrip II; Aleese Simmons; Andre Mortion; Khaleef Chiles; James Banks; Henderson Thigpen; Joseph Budden	Bradley & Stereo	3:49
5.	"Someday One Day"	Milian; Cory Rooney; Gregory Bruno	Rooney; Bruno	4:32
6.	"Highway"	Milian; Warryn "Baby Dubb" Campbell	W. Campbell	3:32
7.	"I'm Sorry"	Milian; Poli	Poli	3:44
8.	"Get Loose"	Delisha Thomas; Rodney Jerkins; Daniel Nixon	Jerkins; Jazz Nixon; Big Shiz^{[a]}	3:38
9.	"L.O.V.E." (featuring Joe Budden)	Warryn Campbell; Joi Campbell; Harold Lilly; Joseph Budden	W. Campbell	4:22
10.	"Peanut Butter & Jelly"	Milian; Kalenna Harper; Kevin Pridgen Jr.; EZ Tommy	Fontez Camp; Tommy; Harper^{[a]}	3:46
11.	"Miss You Like Crazy"	Milian; Jasper Cameron	Jasper Da Fatso	4:49
12.	"Oh Daddy"	Milian; Bryan-Michael Cox; Jason Perry; Albert Johnson; Michael Alston; Shawn C. McFadden; Justin Smith	Cox; Perry^{[b]}	3:56

Japanese edition
No.	Title	Writer(s)	Producer(s)	Length
1.	"Dip It Low"	Poli; Moses	Poli	3:15
2.	"L.O.V.E." (remix)	W. Campbell; J. Campbell; Lilly	W. Campbell	3:45
3.	"Down for You"	Milian; Rooney; Bruno	Rooney; Bruno	3:39
4.	"Someday One Day"	Milian; Rooney; Bruno	Rooney; Bruno	4:30
5.	"Highway"	Milian; W. Campbell	W. Campbell	3:35
6.	"I Can Be That Woman"	Mark Taylor; Jeff Taylor; Steve Lee	M. Taylor; J. Taylor	3:13
7.	"Peanut Butter & Jelly"	Milian; Harper; Pridgen; Tommy	Fontez Camp; Tommy; Harper^{[a]}	3:46
8.	"Hands on Me"	Milian; Rooney; Bruno	Rooney; Bruno	3:06
9.	"7 Days"	Milian; Cameron; Cox	Da Fatso; Cox	4:17
10.	"Oh Daddy"	Milian; Cox; Perry; Johnson; Alston; McFadden; Smith	Cox; Perry^{[b]}	3:55
11.	"Miss You Like Crazy"	Milian; Cameron	Da Fatso	4:50
12.	"Dip It Low" (featuring S-Word)	Poli; Moses; S-Word	Poli	3:41
13.	"Dip It Low" (Full Intention Dub)	Poli; Moses	Poli; Full Intention^{[c]}	7:21

=== Notes ===
- ^{^a} signifies a vocal producer
- ^{^b} signifies a co-producer
- ^{^c} signifies an additional producer
- International pressings include "I Can Be That Woman", with "I'm Sorry" and "Get Loose" switching places.
- International enhanced CD pressings include the music video for "Dip It Low".
- UK pressings and the 2020 expanded edition include "I Can Be That Woman" and "Hands on Me". Japanese world edition pressings additionally include the remix of "Dip It Low" featuring S-Word.
- Japanese limited edition pressings include a bonus DVD containing the music video and making of "Dip It Low", alongside an interview.
- Japanese limited world edition pressings include a bonus DVD containing the music videos for "Dip It Low", "Get Away", "When You Look at Me", and "AM to PM".
- UK limited edition pressings include a bonus DVD containing the music videos for "Dip It Low", "Whatever U Want", "AM to PM", and "When You Look at Me", alongside an It's About Time feature.

Sample credits

- "Intro" contains a sample of "Intro/A Million and One Questions/Rhyme No More" by Jay-Z.
- "Whatever U Want" contains a sample of "Spellbound" by Bar-Kays.
- "Oh Daddy" contains a sample of "Diamond" by Prodigy.

== Charts ==
2004 weekly chart performance
Chart	Peak position
Canadian Albums (Nielsen SoundScan)	63
Canadian R&B Albums (Nielsen SoundScan)	17
Dutch Albums (Album Top 100)	66
French Albums (SNEP)	83
German Albums (Offizielle Top 100)	55
Irish Albums (IRMA)	74
Japanese Albums (Oricon)	11
Scottish Albums (Official Charts)	43
Swiss Albums (Schweizer Hitparade)	35
UK Albums (Official Charts)	21
UK R&B Albums (Official Charts)	9
US Billboard 200	14
US Top R&B/Hip-Hop Albums (Billboard)	5

== Certifications ==
Certifications and sales
Region	Certification	Certified units/sales
Japan (RIAJ)	Gold	100,000^{^}
United Kingdom (BPI)	Silver	60,000^{^}
^{^} Shipments figures based on certification alone.

== Release history ==
Release dates and formats
Region	Date	Edition(s)	Format(s)	Label(s)	Ref.
Japan	March 24, 2004	Standard; limited; world	CD; CD + DVD	Universal	
United Kingdom	May 31, 2004	Standard	Enhanced CD	Def Jam	
Germany	June 1, 2004	Standard	Enhanced CD	Universal	
France	June 15, 2004	Standard	Enhanced CD	Mercury	
United States	June 15, 2004	Standard	CD	Island	
Japan	July 7, 2004	Limited world	CD + DVD	Universal	
United Kingdom	October 4, 2004	Limited	CD + DVD	Def Jam	
Various	May 28, 2020	Expanded	Digital download; streaming	Island	
