= Aleese Simmons =

American singer-songwriter (born 1964)

- Born: January 24, 1964 (age 62); New Jersey, U.S.
- Other name: Aleese
- Children: Latrelle
- Musical career
- Genres: R&B; new jack swing; soul; hip-hop
- Occupations: Singer; songwriter
- Label: Orpheus Records / EMI

Aleese Simmons (born January 24, 1964) is an American singer-songwriter best known for her 1988 hit single "I Want To Be Your Lover", which peaked at #9 on the Billboard R&B chart. Signed to Orpheus Records, Simmons subsequently released the 1988 album I Want It, her only album to date, before moving into songwriting, working with artists such as Aretha Franklin, Whitney Houston, Destiny's Child, and Christina Milian. Simmons is the mother and manager of fellow R&B singer Latrelle.

== Discography ==
Studio albums

- I Want It (1988) Orpheus Records – #51 Billboard R&B Albums Chart

Singles

- "I Want To Be Your Lover" (1988) – #9 Billboard R&B Chart
- "I Want It" (1989) – #53 Billboard R&B Chart
- "Love You Better" (1989)

== Songwriting and production credits ==
Credits are courtesy of Discogs, Tidal, and AllMusic.

Title	Year	Artist	Album
"Now That She's Gone"	1999	Destiny's Child	The Writing's on the Wall
"What U Want" (Featuring Beanie Sigel)	2000	Next	Welcome II Nextasy
"Swingin'" (Featuring Latrelle)	2002	Shaggy	Showtime: The Soundtrack
"Set It Off"	2002	Dawn Robinson	Dawn
"Try It on My Own"	2002	Whitney Houston	Just Whitney
"Wonderful"	2003	Aretha Franklin	So Damn Happy
"Whatever U Want" (Featuring Joe Budden)	2004	Christina Milian	It's About Time
"Appreciate" (Featuring Black Thought)	2005	LaToya London	Love & Life
"Non a Whatcha Do"	2005	LaToya London	Love & Life
"In Crowd"	2007	Sean Stewart	Bratz Motion Picture Soundtrack
"Face To Face"	2008	Case & Coko	Tyler Perry's Meet The Browns (Music From And Inspired By The Motion Picture)
"This Gift"	2008	Deborah Cox	Tyler Perry's Meet The Browns (Music From And Inspired By The Motion Picture)

== Background vocals ==
Title	Year	Artist	Album	Label
"From The Bottom Of My Broken Heart"	1999	Britney Spears	...Baby One More Time	Jive Records
"You Got It All"	2000	Britney Spears	Oops!... I Did It Again	Jive Records
"People Everyday" (Featuring Estelle)	2008	Musiq Soulchild	Tyler Perry's Meet The Browns (Music From And Inspired By The Motion Picture)	Atlantic Records
