= Bratz (disambiguation) =

Bratz is an American product line of fashion dolls and merchandise.

- Bratz (video game), a 2002 video game based on the doll line
- Bratz (film), a 2007 American musical comedy film
- Bratz (TV series), an animated television series
- Bratz (web series), a stop-motion web series

Bratz may also refer to:

- Bratz (surname), a surname

== See also ==
- Brat (disambiguation)
