= Latrelle =

American singer

- Also known as: MzMunchie
- Born: Andrea Latrelle Simmons; April 15, 1981 (age 45)
- Origin: Newark, New Jersey, U.S.
- Genres: R&B, pop, soul
- Occupation: Singer-songwriter
- Years active: 1997–present
- Labels: EMI, Arista
- Website: www.mzmunchie.com

Andrea Latrelle Simmons (born April 15, 1981), better known simply as Latrelle and later as MzMunchie, is an American singer.

== Career ==
Simmons gained her early singing experience in church as a young child. Determined to pursue a career in music, and with her mother and manager, R&B singer Aleese Simmons, at her side, she began recording her own music at the age of sixteen. She showcased at Montana studios in New York City, which led to several labels (Sony Columbia, Motown, Def Jam, Warner Bros, LaFace, Island and Yab Yum) courting the young star. Then she met Tracey and Kenneth "Babyface" Edmonds who signed her and her mother to a publishing deal at Edmonds Music Publishing, and were impressed enough to introduce her to L.A. Reid, and push for Arista to sign the young talent. In her teen years, she wrote songs for artists such as Destiny's Child, Mary Mary, Next, and Monica.

L.A. Reid met Latrelle and was so impressed he offered her a contract on the same day. By the age of 19, she had recorded Dirty Girl, Wrong Girl, Bad Girl, and her first album, which was scheduled for release in October 2001 but was never released. Latrelle's first single "House Party" was produced by the Neptunes (who produced six tracks on her Arista album including "Dirty Girl"). Latrelle has had an ongoing relationship with them ever since. Other producers on the album included Babyface, Allstar, Mike City, David Anthony, J.R.Swinga, and Riff Raf and most songs were written or co-written by Latrelle and Aleese Simmons. The album contained collaborations with singer Kelis and rapper Pusha T, and notably had songs which were later recorded by other artists ("Nothin' Else" would be recorded by Justin Timberlake in 2002, while "Long Time" would be recorded by Shakira in 2009).

The first single "Dirty Girl" was released along with a remix with then label mate T.I. An alternate version with Left Eye was also released. While the single had little impact on radio, it received heavy airplay in clubs and appeared on several mixtapes. In December 2001, "House Party" was released as a follow-up single to "Dirty Girl" and became a minor hit on the Hip-Hop/R&B Charts. The song was remixed in 2017 by Kaytranada. "My Life" feat Kelis was sampled in 2025 by Kaytranada and released as his song "Space Invader".

Since leaving Arista Latrelle she recorded a new album for the label that she co-owns, AMI Music Group. She has also recorded with P. Diddy. The project's first single "We Got Music" was released in April. More recently she has performed and recorded under the stage name MzMunchie. In 2011 she had a minor hit on the Billboard Dance Club Songs chart with "We Got Music".

== Other collaborations ==
Throughout her career, Latrelle has been on Tour with many artists including Lauryn Hill, The Fugees, Blu Cantrell, Alicia Keys, P Diddy, Rihanna, and George Benson to name a few. She has also performed, recorded and/or written with producers and artists such as Rodney Jerkins, Soul Shock and Karlin, Trackmasters, Allstar, Amadeus, Dutch, Whitney Houston (Just Whitney), Mary Mary, Pharrell, Ludacris, Trina, R. Kelly, Mýa, Deborah Cox, Mystikal, Next, Natalie Wilson, Fredro Starr (Light It Up soundtrack), Philly's Most Wanted, Shaggy, Tamia, and Left Eye of TLC.

== Solo discography ==
Album information
Dirty Girl, Wrong Girl, Bad Girl (2001)
- Released: Unreleased, it was intended for October 2, 2001
- Label: Arista
- Chart Peak: N/A
- RIAA Certification: None
- Singles: "House Party", "Dirty Girl", "Infatuated"
We Got Music [EP]
- Released: December 21, 2010
- Label: Andresia Music Group/Fontana Distributions/Atlantic
- Chart Peak: N/A
- RIAA Certification: None
Project M The Missing Melodies [Mixtape]
- Released: N/A
- Label: Andresia Music Group/Fontana Distributions/Atlantic
- Chart Peak: N/A
- RIAA Certification: None
- Singles: "Go Head"
