= It's All Gravy =

2002 single by Romeo

Single by Romeo featuring Christina Milian

from the album Solid Love
- B-side: "Deeper (Part 2)"
- Released: 28 October 2002
- Studio: StarGate (Norway)
- Length: 3:14
- Label: Relentless
- Songwriter(s): Romeo; Hallgeir Rustan; Tor Erik Hermansen; Mikkel Eriksen; Roger Russell; Nathaniel Robinson Jr.; Kirk Robinson; Mark Morales; Mark C. Rooney
- Producer(s): StarGate

Romeo singles chronology
"Romeo Dunn" (2002)	"It's All Gravy" (2002)	"I See Girls (Crazy)" (2003)

Christina Milian singles chronology
"When You Look at Me" (2002)	"It's All Gravy" (2002)	"Look Around" (2003)

Audio
- "It's All Gravy" on YouTube

"It's All Gravy" is a song by British rapper Romeo featuring vocals from American singer Christina Milian. Written by Romeo, StarGate, and Roger Russell, the track samples the keyboard riff from "Real Love", a 1992 song by R&B singer Mary J. Blige, so Audio Two, Mark Morales, and Mark C. Rooney are also credited as writers. In the song, Romeo sings about how he became famous while Milian provides the chorus vocals and ad libs.

"It's All Gravy" was issued as the second single from Romeo's debut solo studio album, Solid Love (2002), on 28 October 2002. Upon its release, the song peaked at number nine on the UK Singles Chart early the following month, becoming Romeo's second and final top-40 hit as a solo act. The song also reached number 32 in Ireland and number 39 on the Eurochart Hot 100. A music video was made to promote the single, featuring Romeo and Milian performing and dancing to the song against a typical R&B backdrop.

== Background ==
Romeo was originally a member of So Solid Crew, who had a UK number-one hit in 2001 with "21 Seconds". Soon afterwards, the group attracted controversy for glorifying gangster culture, and its members began to embark on solo careers, including Romeo. Meanwhile, Christina Milian was disputing with her record label, Def Soul, because she believed her self-titled debut album did not represent her musical identity properly. By singing on "It's All Gravy", Milian began performing music that better resembled the genres she wanted to work with. The track was recorded at StarGate Studios in Norway.

== Composition ==
"It's All Gravy" was written by Romeo, Roger Russell, and Norwegian production team StarGate, who also produced the track. The piano riff in the song is sampled from Mary J. Blige's 1992 single "Real Love", so Audio Two, Mark Morales, and Mark C. Rooney received writing credits for the song as well. The lyrics of the song detail Romeo's rise to fame. He raps the verses while Milian performs the chorus and various ad libs throughout the song.

== Release and reception ==
On 28 October 2002, Relentless Records released "It's All Gravy" in the United Kingdom as a CD and cassette single. The CD contains two versions of the song plus B-side "Deeper (Part 2)", which is also included on the cassette. Critically, British trade publication Music Week listed the song as a "recommended" single, referring to it as "one of the coolest duets of the year". British columnist James Masterton commented on the song after it charted in the UK, writing that Milian "overshadows" Romeo on the recording but provides the "perfect" hook. Retrospectively, music website Can't Stop the Pop praised the song's "sincere" charisma, Milian's performance, and the two singers' chemistry, noting that the composition does not stray too far from the sound of So Solid Crew yet establishes enough identify to endorse Romeo's talents.

Commercially, "It's All Gravy" debuted and peaked at number nine on the UK Singles Chart on 3 November 2002, becoming Romeo's second and final solo single to chart in the UK. Like his previous single, "Romeo Dunn", it stayed in the UK top 100 for nine weeks. On the UK R&B Singles Chart, the song reached number six. At the end of 2002, the song came in at number 158 on the UK year-end chart. In Ireland, it was Romeo's only single to enter the top 50 without involvement from other So Solid Crew members, reaching number 32 on 31 October 2002. The single's combined UK and Irish sales allowed the song to appear on the Eurochart Hot 100, where it debuted at its peak of number 39 on 16 November 2002.

== Track listings ==
UK CD single

1. "It's All Gravy" (radio version)
2. "It's All Gravy" (video version)
3. "Deeper (Part 2)" (featuring Lisa Maffia and Swiss)

UK cassette single

1. "It's All Gravy" (video version)
2. "Deeper (Part 2)" (featuring Lisa Maffia and Swiss)

== Credits and personnel ==
Credits are taken from the UK cassette single sleeve.

Studios

- Recorded and mixed at StarGate Studios (Norway)
- Mastered at 777 (UK)

Personnel

- Romeo – writing
- StarGate – production, recording, mixing (StarGate Studios)
  - Hallgeir Rustan – writing
  - Tor Erik Hermansen – writing
  - Mikkel Eriksen – writing
- Roger Russell – writing
- Nathaniel Robinson Jr. – writing ("Real Love")
- Kirk Robinson – writing ("Real Love")
- Mark Morales – writing ("Real Love")
- Mark C. Rooney ("Real Love")
- Double R – co-production, recording, mixing (StarGate Studios)
- Jeremy Wheatley – mixing
- Jeremy Cooper – mastering

== Charts ==
=== Weekly charts ===
Chart (2002)	Peak position
Europe (Eurochart Hot 100)	39
Ireland (IRMA)	32
Scotland (OCC)	15
UK Singles (OCC)	9
UK Hip Hop/R&B (OCC)	6

=== Year-end charts ===
Chart (2002)	Position
UK Singles (OCC)	158
