= 4U (Christina Milian EP) =

EP by Christina Milian
- Released: December 4, 2015
- Genre: R&B; electro; hip hop soul
- Length: 15:02
- Label: Milianheiress Music
- Producer: Silent Killers; Marley "Genesis" Waters “Jaylen Maloy” J.Moní

Christina Milian chronology
Best Of (2006)	4U (2015)

4U is the first EP by American singer Christina Milian. It was released on December 4, 2015, by Milianheiress Music.

== Background and composition ==
Originally, Milian planned to release a mixtape album titled #TinaTurnUp while waiting to release an album on Young Money Entertainment. Previously, she had appeared on the Stafford Brothers single "Hello," the compilation album Young Money: Rise of an Empire and on Lil' Wayne's single "Start a Fire" for the label. Eventually, she set out to release a 5-track EP titled Like Me alongside a visual album complete with music videos shot for each one, set for an October 30, 2015 release. However, it was changed shortly after into a 4-track release titled 4U and pushed back to December 4, 2015.

== Promotion ==
"Rebel" was released as the EP's first promotional single on March 1, 2015. A music video directed by Alton Glass premiered on May 5, 2015.

"We Ain't Worried" (which was not included on the EP) was released as a promotional single for her "We Are Pop Culture" clothing line on March 24, 2015. A promotional video premiered on March 8, 2015 while the song's official music video directed by Mykel Monroe premiered exclusively on E! Online on March 25, 2015.

"Do It" (featuring Lil Wayne) was released on September 16, 2015. A lyric video was released on November 20, 2015 while a music video directed by CJ South premiered on November 30, 2015.

A music video for "Like Me" (featuring Snoop Dogg) directed by Mike Ho premiered on December 17, 2015, while the music video for "Liar" premiered directed by Jahmel A. Holden on February 12, 2016.

== Track listing ==
No.	Title	Writer(s)	Producer(s)	Length
1.	"Rebel"	Christine Flores, Matt Cash, Ocean Marciano, Supa Nova	Silent Killers	4:30
2.	"Do It" (featuring Lil Wayne)		Marley "Genesis" Waters	3:32
3.	"Liar"			3:11
4.	"Like Me" (featuring Snoop Dogg)			3:52
