= Christina Milian (album) =

- Standard cover (Note: Original pressings display a green background. Japanese edition cover features a different image of Milian.)

Studio album by Christina Milian
- Released: January 21, 2002
- Recorded: 2001
- Studios: 3:36 (New Jersey); Crackhouse (New York); The Green Room (Atlanta); The Loft (Bronxville); Murlyn (Stockholm); Silent Sound (Atlanta); Soundtracks (New York); SouthSide (Atlanta)
- Genres: R&B; pop
- Length: 47:53
- Label: Def Soul
- Producers: Bloodshy & Avant; Bryan-Michael Cox; Jermaine Dupri; Focus...; Fredro; Irv Gotti; Mark Hill; Montell Jordan; Evan Rogers; Carl Sturken

Christina Milian chronology
Christina Milian (2002)	It's About Time (2004)

Singles from Christina Milian
- 1. "AM to PM" Released: July 24, 2001; 2. "When You Look at Me" Released: May 2, 2002

Christina Milian is the debut studio album by American singer Christina Milian. It was released on January 21, 2002, by Def Soul.

Milian made her first professional musical appearance on Ja Rule's single "Between Me and You", which led to a record deal with Def Soul in 2000. Milian traveled to Sweden where she collaborated with several producers, most notably Bloodshy & Avant, who helmed five tracks from Christina Milian. Milian co-wrote 11 of the 12 songs on the album, taking inspiration from personal experiences. The album's musical style is mostly dance and R&B, and critics noted similarities to Milian's contemporaries Britney Spears and Christina Aguilera. Milian was displeased by Def Soul's portrayal of her image, which she felt was constantly changing and confusing the audience.

Upon release, Christina Milian received mixed reviews from music critics, with praise directed towards pop-influenced material, and criticism towards a perceived lack of originality. The album's domestic release was shelved due to the September 11 attacks, which occurred two weeks before its intended US release date of September 25, 2001. Internationally, the album peaked at number 23 in the UK, and within the top 20 in Japan. It spawned two singles, "AM to PM" and "When You Look at Me", both of which became top-10 hits in the UK. Christina Milian would remain unreleased in the US until August 21, 2020, when a deluxe edition was made available for digital consumption.

== Production and composition ==
Following her collaboration with Ja Rule, Milian signed a deal with Island Def Jam Music Group in 2000. Milian traveled to Sweden and recorded her self-titled debut album, working with the popular producers of that time. Milian collaborated with Bloodshy & Avant, Jermaine Dupri, Focus, Irv Gotti, Mark Hill, Montell Jordan and Evan Rogers. Soren Baker of the Los Angeles Times later suggested that instead of launching her career off the success of "Between Me and You", and by recording in Sweden without the "platinum production touch" of Irv Gotti, the owner of The Inc. Records, the momentum created by the song had evaporated. Milian received writing credit for eleven of the twelve songs on the album. It was during the production of the album that Milian had first started to write songs, and wrote about things that she could relate to at the time.

Multiple critics described the record's musical style as a fusion of R&B and pop. Milian described the sound of the album as "hip hop under-toned with nice, pop melodies", retrospectively referring to the style as bubblegum pop. She described lead single "AM to PM" as a "very pop" and "fun, party/club song". Critics compared Milian to Janet Jackson and Aaliyah. Sonically, the album was said to stick "rigidly to the sherbert-snorting pop formula of Britney Spears and Christina Aguilera". One reviewer compared Milian to other singers of her generation, and found that "while Spears has gone raunchy with 'I Love Rock 'n' Roll', Christina Aguilera down and dirty on Stripped, and even clean-cut Mandy Moore has brashly cut her hair Felicity-style, Milian still seems young and real." The critic also compared Milian to Beyoncé Knowles, "while Beyonce is shaking her bootylicious body like crazy on 'Crazy In Love', Milian is simply enjoying becoming a young star."

Many live instruments were used during the album's production, especially violin. Milian named "You Make Me Laugh" one of her favorite songs on the album. It was the first song written by Milian for the album, and she worked with Bloodshy for the song's production. The album's second and final single, "When You Look at Me", was written by Milian. Using her school days as the inspiration for the song, Milian said that "when I was growing up, I found people were always trying to label me. The first day of school it would be like 'Here comes this girl all dressed up. She thinks she's all that' and they didn't even know me. The message behind 'When You Look At Me' is never judge a book by its cover." Milian asked Ja Rule to appear on her album, however she did not want to put him "on just any song", and wanted to make sure it was the right song for him. Milian hoped Ja Rule would appear on the track "A Girl Like Me", but he ended up rapping on "Get Away". Milian co-wrote the track "Twitch" with R&B singer Montell Jordan, which explains that men have a certain twitch of their shoulders whenever they tell lies.

== Critical reception ==
Professional ratings
Review scores
Source	Rating
AllMusic	2.5/5 stars
Blender	2/5 stars
entertainment.ie	2/5 stars
The Guardian	4/5 stars
iafrica.com	5/5 stars
NME	7/10
Vibe	2.5/5 marks

The album received mixed to positive reviews from music critics. Imran Ahmed of the New Musical Express praised Milian's debut as polished, hit-driven pop, highlighting the "genius" single "AM to PM" and noting a "certain depth of soul" beneath its glossy, Britney- and Christina-inspired formula. He cited several tracks as evidence of her strong potential and suggested that "genius can't be more than a few albums away." A reviewer for Dawn commended the album for being "full of danceable, likeable tracks, and even the occasional, successful ballad like 'Until I Get Over You'". The reviewer called the album to be "a refreshing change with its charming lyrics and teen outlook". "AM to PM" was said to hint at "quite a lot of talent", and was praised for its "slick lyrics, a fast pace, and a phat vibe." Carmen Meyer of iafrica.com described the album as "smooth, groovy and refreshing," filled with "light-hearted and catchy tracks" ranging from "melodic and heart-rending ballads to funky dance beats." She praised the "AM to PM," the "exciting" "A Girl Like Me," and "Till I Get Over You," which she said is "guaranteed to pull at your heartstrings."

John Aizlewood, writing for The Guardian, wrote that while Milian's ballad singing was serviceable, it was only just convincing. Her real strength lay in polished R&B pop. Songs such as "AM to PM" were singled out as sharp and infectious, and he concluded that the album was consistently strong, with few missteps overall. Vibe editor Kylee Swenson found that Milian struggled with ballads, calling "It Hurts When" a "trite track about heartbreak," but praised her on dance-oriented songs, where her lyrics were more vivid. Tracks like "Twitch" and "When You Look at Me" were highlighted as energetic and effective. Contrastingly, Andrew Lynch of entertainment.ie described the album as "relentlessly ordinary", and suggested that Milian needed original ideas. hE felt that apart from "AM to PM" and "You Make Me Laugh" there was nothing above the average. Lynch said that if Milian "really wants to compete with the big girls, she badly needs to spice up her tired formula." Neil Drumming from Blender was largely critical, arguing that Milian lacked a distinctive voice or style as a solo artist. While she was seen as effective in a supporting role, he felt her vocals on Christina Milian were thin and bland, her performances derivative of better-known artists, and her songwriting generic and uninspired.

== Release and commercial performance ==
The album was released on 21 January 2002 in the United Kingdom. It peaked at number 23 in the UK, selling a total of 101,986 copies, and achieved gold certification. Internationally, the album peaked at number 36 in the Netherlands, 98 in Sweden, and 138 in France. The release date in the US was scheduled for September 25, 2001, yet the September 11 attacks occurred and the release date was postponed, and eventually canceled. The album's lead single, "AM to PM", peaked at number three in the UK, the top five in Denmark, the top 10 in the Netherlands, and the top 30 in Australia and the US Billboard Hot 100. The album's second and final single, "When You Look at Me", reached number three in the UK and in the Netherlands, the top 10 in Australia, and the top 20 in Denmark and France. A music video for the track "Get Away" was filmed in Paris, although it was not officially released as a single. To promote the album, Milian toured with NSYNC, serving as the opening act. Band member JC Chasez said, "she was like the cute, spunky kid sister. Not everyone could take Justin's practical jokes or my teasing."

Milian believed that the public expected "a certain thing" from her when she first appeared with Ja Rule, however she wanted to record the type of music she was signed to do. She said that "AM to PM" was a "cool record", but it was not what the public expected. Milian felt that her record label was confused as to how they wanted her image to be portrayed; one second she was young and singing "AM to PM", and next she was a grown woman singing "Get Away". She realized that the change confused the audience, and that "nobody was buying it". To explain that she was serious about her musical career, Milian approached the executives at Island Def Jam, and "cussed them all out", telling them that they were not listening to her.

== Track listing ==
Christina Milian
No.	Title	Writer(s)	Producer(s)	Length
1.	"Get Away" (featuring Ja Rule)	Irv Lorenzo; Jeffery Atkins; Christina Milian	Irv Gotti	4:13
2.	"AM to PM"	Milian; Christian Karlsson; Pontus Winberg	Bloodshy; Avant^{[a]}	3:52
3.	"When You Look at Me"	Milian; Karlsson; Nina Woodford; Fredrik "Fredro" Odesjo; Henrik Jonback	Bloodshy; Avant^{[a]}	3:43
4.	"Spending Time" (featuring Charli "Chuck" Baltimore)	Lorenzo; Atkins; Tiffany Lane	Gotti	4:32
5.	"It Hurts When..."	Milian; Montell Jordan; Bernard Edwards, Jr.	Focus...; Jordan	4:02
6.	"You Make Me Laugh"	Milian; Karlsson; Odesjo	Bloodshy; Fredro^{[a]}	3:37
7.	"A Girl Like Me" (featuring Jermaine Dupri)	Milian; Dupri; Bryan-Michael Cox	Dupri; Cox^{[a]}	4:00
8.	"Twitch"	Milian; Jordan; Edwards	Focus...; Jordan	4:02
9.	"Until I Get Over You"	Milian; Evan Rogers; Carl Sturken	Rogers; Sturken	3:58
10.	"Satisfaction Guaranteed"	Milian; Mark Hill	Hill	3:45
11.	"Got to Have You"	Milian; Karlsson; Winberg	Bloodshy; Avant^{[a]}; Milian^{[a]}	3:38
12.	"Thank You"	Milian; Rogers; Sturken	Rogers; Sturken	4:30

Deluxe edition
No.	Title	Writer(s)	Producer(s)	Length
13.	"Your Last Call"	Milian; Karlsson; Winberg; Jonback	Bloodshy; Avant^{[a]}	3:37
14.	"Perfect"	Milian; Nate Butler; Sean K. Hall	Hall	4:07
15.	"Snooze Ya Lose"	Milian; Karlsson; Odesjo; Jonback	Bloodshy; Avant^{[a]}	3:31
16.	"Let Go"	Milian; Karlsson; Winberg	Bloodshy; Avant^{[a]}	3:41
Total length:				62:35

=== Notes ===
- ^{^a} signifies a co-producer
- Track 13 originally appeared on UK pressings, and the digital reissue.
- Tracks 15 and 16 originally appeared on Japanese pressings, with the former titled "You Snooze, You Lose".
- On the deluxe edition, "Get Away" is placed as track 3, after "AM to PM" and "When You Look at Me".

== Personnel ==
- Executive producers – Christina Milian, Jeff Fenster, Carmen Milian
- Vocal assistance – Montell Jordan, Jeanette Olsson, Christina Milian
- Vocal arrangements – Christina Milian, Bloodshy, Avant, Focus, Montell Jordan
- Engineers – Joe Chiccarelli, Brian Frye, Al Hemberger, Glenn Matullo, Carlisle Young
- Assistant engineers – Tom Bender, Stephanie Vonarx
- Conductors – Janson & Janson
- Mixing – Mick Guzauski, Tony Maserati, Peter Mokran, Brian Springer, Phil Tan
- Design – Shanna Busman
- Art direction – Shanna Busman
- Photography – Tony Duran
- Bass – LaMarquis Mark Jefferson, Thomas Lindberg
- Cello – Asa Forsberg
- Guitar – Henrik Jonback
- Viola – Hans Akeson, Elisabeth Arnberg Ranmo, Monika Stanikowska
- Violin – Dag Alin, Torbjorn Bernhardsson, Hanna Gähran, Per Hammarstrom, Annette Mannheimer, Svein H. Martinsen, Martin Stensson

== Charts ==
=== Weekly charts ===
2002 weekly chart performance
Chart	Peak position
Australian Urban Albums (ARIA)	17
Dutch Albums (Album Top 100)	36
European Top 100 Albums (Music & Media)	71
French Albums (SNEP)	138
German Albums (Offizielle Top 100)	51
Irish Albums (IRMA)	41
Japanese Albums (Oricon)	19
Scottish Albums (Official Charts)	38
Swiss Albums (Schweizer Hitparade)	98
UK Albums (Official Charts)	23
UK R&B Albums (Official Charts)	7

=== Year-end charts ===
2002 year-end chart performance
Chart	Position
UK Albums (OCC)	195

== Certifications ==
Certifications and sales
Region	Certification	Certified units/sales
Japan (RIAJ)	Gold	100,000^{^}
United Kingdom (BPI)	Gold	100,000^{^}
^{^} Shipments figures based on certification alone.

== Release history ==
Release dates and formats
Region	Date	Edition(s)	Format(s)	Label(s)	Ref.
United Kingdom	January 21, 2002	Standard	CD	Def Soul; Mercury	
Japan	January 23, 2002	Standard	CD	Universal	
France	March 19, 2002	Standard	CD	Def Soul	
Germany	July 15, 2002	Standard	CD	Universal	
Various	August 21, 2020	Deluxe	Digital download; streaming	Island	
