= When You Look at Me =

2002 single by Christina Milian

Single by Christina Milian

from the album Christina Milian
- B-side: "AM to PM" (Groove Chronicles main remix)
- Released: May 2, 2002
- Length: 3:45
- Label: Def Soul; The Inc.
- Songwriters: Christina Milian; Christian Karlsson; Nina Woodford; Fredrik Odesjo; Henrik Jonback
- Producer: Bloodshy & Avant

Christina Milian singles chronology
"AM to PM" (2001)	"When You Look at Me" (2002)	"It's All Gravy" (2002)

Audio sample
- Christina Milian - "When You Look at Me": file; help

"When You Look at Me" is a song by American singer Christina Milian. It was written by Milian, Christian Karlsson, Nina Woodford, Fredrik Odesjo and Henrik Jonback, and produced by Bloodshy & Avant for her self-titled debut album (2001). The song served as the album's second single outside the United States and became a hit throughout Australia and Europe, reaching the top 10 in Australia, Flanders, Hungary, Ireland, the Netherlands, and the United Kingdom.

== Writing ==
Milian used her school days as inspiration when writing the song. Milian said that "when I was growing up, I found people were always trying to label me. The first day of school it would be like 'Here comes this girl all dressed up. She thinks she's all that' and they didn't even know me. The message behind 'When You Look at Me' is never judge a book by its cover."

== Music video ==
The video was shot on March 2, 2002, in Los Angeles and was directed by Billie Woodruff. In the video, Milian dances in four different costumes and in different rooms. One costume is a white, short sleeved blouse with a pink mini-skirt and is featured in an area with pink and white walls. She is then seen in a blue room, with some jean material on the wall as wallpaper, dancing in with some background dancers. She is wearing blue jeans and a blue shirt. Next, she is shown in an orange room, wearing an orange camisole and orange pants, with a lot of male background dancers in white behind her. After this, she is seen in a small red room, sitting on a couch, wearing a red and black pashmina with her hair long and straight. The music video ends with a reprisal of the chorus, and switching between all four rooms.

== Track listings ==
UK CD single
No.	Title	Writer(s)	Producer(s)	Length
1.	"When You Look at Me" (album version)	Christina Milian; Christian Karlsson; Nina Woodford; Fredrik Odesjo; Henrik Jonback	Bloodshy; Avant^{[a]}	3:42
2.	"When You Look at Me" (Agent X remix featuring Romeo)	Milian; Karlsson; Woodford; Odesjo; Jonback	Bloodshy; Avant^{[a]}; Agent X^{[b]}; Greg Bonnick^{[b]}; Leon Spencer^{[b]}	5:41
3.	"When You Look at Me" (Agent X remix)	Milian; Karlsson; Woodford; Odesjo; Jonback	Bloodshy; Avant^{[a]}; Agent X^{[b]}; Bonnick^{[b]}; Spencer^{[b]}	5:41
4.	"When You Look at Me" (video)			2:57

UK cassette single
No.	Title	Writer(s)	Producer(s)	Length
1.	"When You Look at Me" (album version)	Milian; Karlsson; Woodford; Odesjo; Jonback	Bloodshy; Avant^{[a]}	3:42
2.	"When You Look at Me" (Agent X remix featuring Romeo)	Milian; Karlsson; Woodford; Odesjo; Jonback	Bloodshy; Avant^{[a]}; Agent X^{[b]}; Bonnick^{[b]}; Spencer^{[b]}	5:41

UK 12-inch single
No.	Title	Writer(s)	Producer(s)	Length
1.	"When You Look at Me" (album version)	Milian; Karlsson; Woodford; Odesjo; Jonback	Bloodshy; Avant^{[a]}	3:42
2.	"When You Look at Me" (Agent X remix)	Milian; Karlsson; Woodford; Odesjo; Jonback	Bloodshy; Avant^{[a]}; Agent X^{[b]}; Bonnick^{[b]}; Spencer^{[b]}	5:41
3.	"When You Look at Me" (Agent X remix featuring Romeo)	Milian; Karlsson; Woodford; Odesjo; Jonback	Bloodshy; Avant^{[a]}; Agent X^{[b]}; Bonnick^{[b]}; Spencer^{[b]}	5:41

European CD single
No.	Title	Writer(s)	Producer(s)	Length
1.	"When You Look at Me" (original version radio edit)	Milian; Karlsson; Woodford; Odesjo; Jonback	Bloodshy; Avant^{[a]}	3:45
2.	"When You Look at Me" (Bloodshy remix radio edit)	Milian; Karlsson; Woodford; Odesjo; Jonback	Bloodshy; Avant^{[a]}	2:58

Australasian CD single
No.	Title	Writer(s)	Producer(s)	Length
1.	"When You Look at Me" (original version radio edit)	Milian; Karlsson; Woodford; Odesjo; Jonback	Bloodshy; Avant^{[a]}	3:45
2.	"When You Look at Me" (Bloodshy remix radio edit)	Milian; Karlsson; Woodford; Odesjo; Jonback	Bloodshy; Avant^{[a]}	2:58
3.	"AM to PM" (Groove Chronicles main mix)	Milian; Karlsson; Woodford	Bloodshy; Avant^{[a]}; Groove Chronicles^{[b]}	5:36
4.	"When You Look at Me" (video)

Notes

- ^{^[a]} denotes co-producer
- ^{^[b]} denotes additional producer

== Charts ==
=== Weekly charts ===
Chart (2002)	Peak position
Australia (ARIA)	7
Australian Urban (ARIA)	2
Austria (Ö3 Austria Top 40)	13
Belgium (Ultratop 50 Flanders)	7
Belgium (Ultratop 50 Wallonia)	25
Denmark (Tracklisten)	16
Europe (Eurochart Hot 100)	10
France (SNEP)	11
Germany (GfK)	13
Hungary (Rádiós Top 40)	2
Hungary (Single Top 40)	3
Ireland (IRMA)	5
Italy (FIMI)	37
Netherlands (Dutch Top 40)	3
Netherlands (Single Top 100)	3
Poland (Polish Airplay Charts)	8
Romania (Romanian Top 100)	32
Scottish Singles Sales (Official Charts)	5
Sweden (Sverigetopplistan)	16
Switzerland (Schweizer Hitparade)	31
UK Singles (Official Charts)	3
UK Hip Hop/R&B (Official Charts)	2

=== Year-end charts ===
Chart (2002)	Position
Australia (ARIA)	29
Australian Urban (ARIA)	7
Belgium (Ultratop 50 Flanders)	46
Belgium (Ultratop 50 Wallonia)	93
France (SNEP)	60
Germany (Media Control)	62
Ireland (IRMA)	29
Netherlands (Dutch Top 40)	35
Netherlands (Single Top 100)	33
Sweden (Hitlistan)	71
Switzerland (Schweizer Hitparade)	99
UK Singles (OCC)	52
UK Airplay (Music Week)	66

== Certifications ==
Region	Certification	Certified units/sales
Australia (ARIA)	Gold	35,000^{^}
France (SNEP)	Gold	250,000^{*}
United Kingdom (BPI)	Silver	200,000^{‡}
^{*} Sales figures based on certification alone.^{^} Shipments figures based on certification alone.^{‡} Sales+streaming figures based on certification alone.

== Release history ==
Region	Date	Format(s)	Label(s)	Ref.
Japan	May 2, 2002	CD	Universal Music Japan	
Australia	May 13, 2002	CD	Def Soul; The Inc.	
United Kingdom	June 17, 2002	12-inch vinyl; CD; cassette	Def Soul; The Inc.	
