= Us Against the World (Christina Milian song) =

Single by Christina Milian
- Released: October 6, 2008
- Studio: Larrabee Sound (Hollywood, California)
- Length: 4:39 (single version); 4:16 (Jason Nevins remix); 4:02 (video edit)
- Label: MySpace; Interscope
- Songwriters: Christina Milian; Makeba Riddick; Theodore "Madd Scientst" Thomas
- Producer: Madd Scientist

Christina Milian singles chronology
"Say I" (2006)	"Us Against the World" (2008)	"Hello" (2012)

Alternative cover
- Cover for Jason Nevins remix

"Us Against the World" is a song by American entertainer Christina Milian. It was written by Milian and Makeba Riddick as well as the producer Theodore "Madd Scientst" Thomas. The song was released for streaming as a single on October 6, 2008 by MySpace Records, through a joint venture with Interscope, as part of a new record deal for Milian. The song is Milian's first release since her 2006 album So Amazin' and the single "Say I". Shortly after the release of that album, Milian was dropped from longtime record label Def Jam due to poor album sales. "Us Against the World" is a cinematic ballad, which Milian acknowledged was her first ballad release. Milian conceived the song as a love anthem while watching the 1996 adaption of William Shakespeare's romantic tragedy, Romeo and Juliet, and wanting to create music that captured the same themes.

A music video inspired by the films Mad Max (1979) and 300 (2007), helmed by Ray Kay, was released in promotion of the song. Filmed in Sepia, the video features Milian alone amongst sand dunes in a desert backdrop before uniting with her love interest. Kay had previously worked with Milian for the videos on the videos for her singles "Whatever U Want" and "Say I" in 2004 and 2006, respectively. Additionally, a remix of the song produced by Jason Nevins was, released in January 2009. "Us Against the World" experienced limited commercial success, peaking at number 65 on the US Billboard Pop 100 Airplay and number 112 on the UK Singles Chart. The song was billed as the lead single for her fourth studio album Dream in Colour, later titled Elope, which ultimately went unreleased after more record label changes for Milian.

== Background and release ==
In 2006, Milian left longtime record label Def Jam Recordings, shortly after the release of her third studio album So Amazin'. It was widely reported in the media that this was due to low album sales, with 163,000 copies of So Amazin' sold in the first week. Speaking to Rap-Up, Milian said the experience had a negative impact on her, "It was embarrassing. It was a week after my album got put out. I would be in my room a lot of the time crying by myself." Milian said she was let go by the label for budget cuts, but felt like it was "to spend the money on [Rihanna]". Less than two years later, it was confirmed that Milian had signed a new deal with MySpace Records, a joint venture between the social networking service MySpace and American record label Interscope.

Billboard carried the exclusive announcement, in which Milian said: "I've been out of the game for one-and-a-half years, and I think I'm long overdue for a comeback, so I'm treating this album like it's my last chance to make an impression. I'm competing with myself and being very detailed." "Us Against the World" was announced as the album's lead single, with the album, tentatively titled Dream in Colour, due for release in early 2009. The song was made available for streaming on the MySpace platform as a single by the aforementioned record labels on October 6, 2008. It was serviced to US contemporary hit radio on October 28, 2008. A Jason Nevins produced remix of the song was later released, and appeared on the compilation album Jason Nevins Presents Ultra Dance 10, released on January 6, 2009. The remix was released to iTunes in the United States on January 6, 2009 by Radio Killa Records, MySpace and Interscope.

In early 2009, Milian confirmed that she had signed to The-Dream's Radio Killa record label and would be re-titling the album Elope. Further delays to the album's release came as Radio Killa and Milian agreed a deal with Interscope to distribute the album. Initially, "Us Against the World" was still billed as the album's first single, but Milian later stated that fans could expect a new lead single in 2009.

== Music and lyrics ==
"Us Against the World" was written by Milian, Makeba Riddick and Theodore "Madd Scientst" Thomas, with the latter also handing production; the song was mixed by Manny Marroquin at Larrabee Sound Studios in Hollywood, California. Billboard's Mariel Concepcion described the song as a "cinematic power ballad". Milian conceived the concept while watching the 1996 adaption of William Shakespeare's romantic tragedy Romeo and Juliet, and wanting to write a love song to reflect the same themes. Describing the song as her first ballad, Milian told RWDmag that it was about "having somebody to be there for you through thick and thin". In another interview with 944 Magazine, Milian called the song a "love anthem" because "the lyrics speak a million words for people all over the world", adding that:

I am taking a chance by putting out my first ballad it's very exciting. I think our country specifically needs a record like this. It's about passion, true love and sticking by someone through thick and thin. Life and love can be a battle and I would like to inspire people with love.

Similarly, Milian told MTV News that she wanted a song so that people would know that there "are people that are holding it down for somebody. It's important to have someone that has your back."

== Music video ==
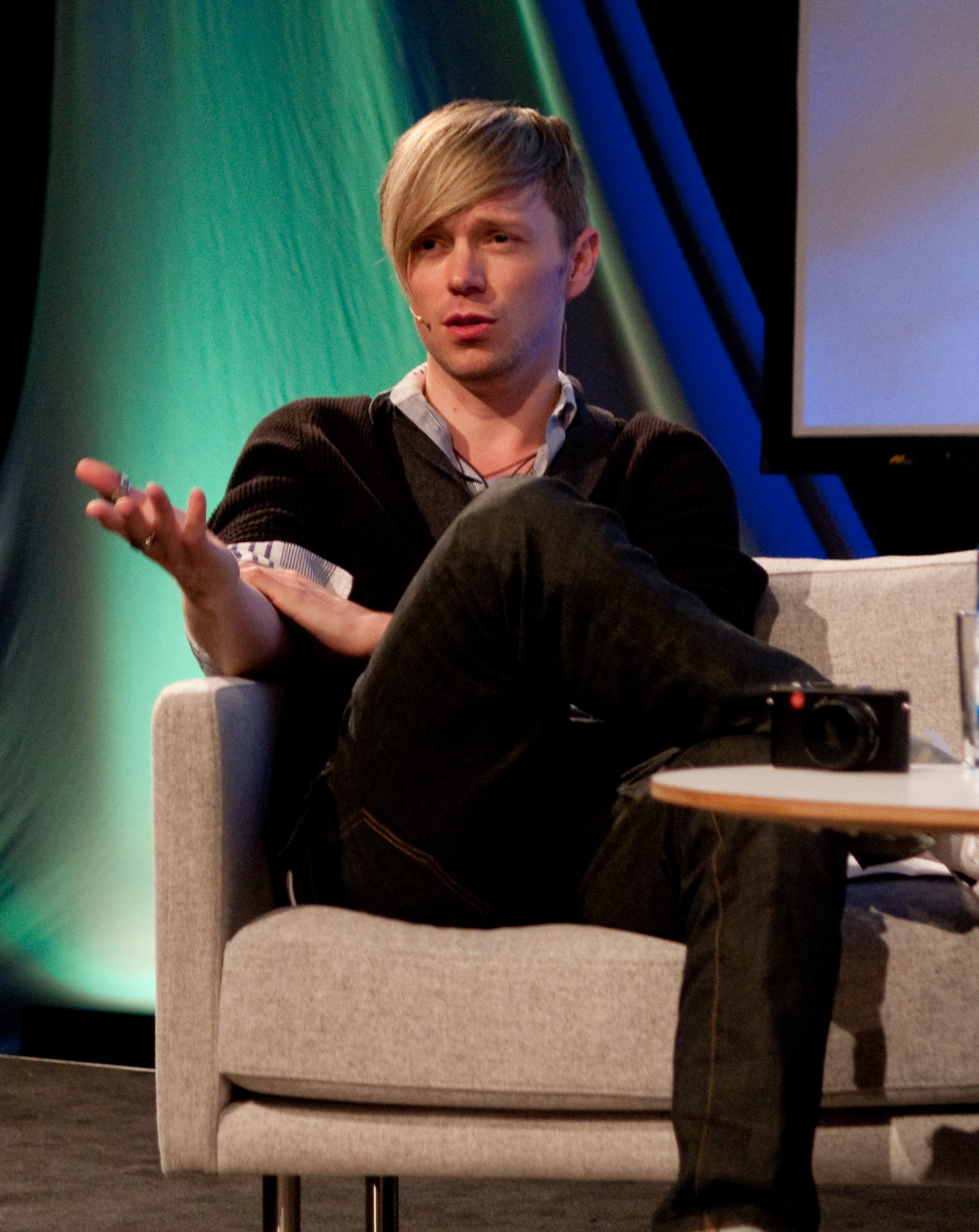
Ray Kay previously worked with Milian on music videos for "Whatever U Want" and "Say I".

During an interview in December 2008 with MTV News at the KIIS-FM Los Angeles Jingle Ball, Milian revealed that she was finishing up work on a music video for "Us Against the World". It was helmed by Norwegian director Ray Kay, who had previously directed the videos for Milian's singles "Whatever U Want" (2004) and "Say I" (2006), and took inspiration for the music video from the films Mad Max (1979) and 300 (2006). Speaking about what people could expect from the video, Milian promise a backdrop of sand dunes and a love story between herself and her lover, the only other person on Earth. In her interview with MTV News, she stated:

Really, I'm on my own and I'm searching, and finally he comes to me. I don't know where he's been, and he comes back to me. It's very timeless. When you see it, it's nothing like anything you'd see now. I want to be iconic in every music video that I do. I want to make a mark. This is very different.

People magazine offered a preview of the video on January 9, 2009, as well as confirming that the fully finished version would premiere via Milian's MySpace page on January 13, 2009. According to Video Static, the music video was filmed in sepia, with Milian taking the narrative of being "out in the middle of a desert without a soul in sight — except for the hunky man who wanders over to join in her defiant stance against whatever forces might assail their union."

On working with Milian on the music video, Kay felt that the experience pushed him and his team into new territory. He commended Milain's growth as an artist since So Amazin' (2006) and expressed his intentions to show that grow in the music video. He stated that his "aim was to create an iconic image of Christina, and use the desert and elemental fashion as a visual metaphor of the lyrics." The video has a theme of desert imagery. Kay expanded on how the video was created, explaining that "the sand dunes in the video were used by ATV and dune buggy enthusiasts at the time of filming. The video was shot during the busiest weekend of the year for the location, and the crew were constantly forced to stop filming to get clear backgrounds."

== Track listings ==
- Digital/CD Single
1. "Us Against the World" – 4:39
- Digital download – Remix
1. "Us Against the World" (Jason Nevins remix) – 4:16

== Credits and personnel ==
Credits adapted from the liner notes of the CD single.

Recording locations

- Mixed at Larrabee Sound Studios in Hollywood (California)

Personnel

- Christina Milian – lead vocals, songwriter
- Manny Marroquin – mixing, mastering
- Makeba Riddick – songwriter
- Theodore "Madd Scientst" Thomas – songwriter, producer

== Charts ==
Chart performance for "Us Against the World"
Chart (2009)	Peak position
UK Singles (Official Charts Company)	112
US Pop 100 Airplay (Billboard)	65

== Release history ==
Release formats and dates for "Us Against the World"
Country	Date	Format	Version	Label^{[a]}	Ref.
Various	October 6, 2008	Streaming (MySpace)	Original version	MySpace Records; Interscope	
Various	October 11, 2008	CD single	Original version	MySpace Records; Interscope	
United States	October 28, 2008	Contemporary hit radio	Original version	MySpace Records; Interscope	
United States	January 6, 2009	Album track download^{[b]}	Jason Nevins remix	Ultra Records	
United States	January 20, 2009	Digital download	Jason Nevins remix	Radio Killa; MySpace; Interscope	

Notes

- ^{^[a]} In the UK, "Us Against the World" was distributed by Mercury Records.
- ^{^[b]} The Jason Nevins remix was first released on the compilation album Jason Nevins presents Ultra Dance 10, where it could be downloaded as an album track.
