= Dip It Low =

2004 single by Christina Milian

Single by Christina Milian featuring Fabolous

from the album It's About Time
- Released: March 8, 2004
- Studio: Studio Atlantis (California); Larrabee North (California)
- Genre: R&B
- Length: 3:38
- Label: Island
- Songwriters: Poli Paul; Teedra Moses
- Producers: Poli Paul; Matt Ward; Dean Gillard

Christina Milian singles chronology
"Look Around" (2003)	"Dip It Low" (2004)	"Whatever U Want" (2004)

Fabolous singles chronology
"Make U Mine" (2003)	"Dip It Low" (2004)	"Badaboom" (2004)

Music video
- "Dip It Low" on YouTube

"Dip It Low" is a song recorded by American singer and songwriter Christina Milian from her second studio album, It's About Time (2004). Written by Poli Paul and Teedra Moses and produced by Paul, the track was released as the album's lead single. Matt Ward and Dean Gallard provided additional production for the song with Ne-Yo working on vocal arrangements.

While the original version of the song, featuring American rapper Fabolous, was only given a release in the United States, Canada, Ireland, and the United Kingdom, the remix featuring German rapper Samy Deluxe was released in Austria, Finland, France, Germany, Sweden, and Switzerland. A solo version was released in Australia, Belgium, Denmark, the Netherlands, New Zealand, and Norway. Commercially, "Dip It Low" reached number one in Canada, number two in the United Kingdom, and number five in the United States.

== Background ==
"Dip It Low" is Christina Milian's most successful to date, reaching number five on the US Billboard Hot 100 chart as well as the top five in the United Kingdom and the top ten in the Denmark, the Netherlands, New Zealand, and Norway. Milian also performed and promoted the song for a Tommy Hilfiger Jeans commercial. The song was nominated for the Grammy Award for Best Rap/Sung Collaboration at the 47th Annual Grammy Awards in 2005, and was certified gold by the Recording Industry Association of America in early January 2005. It remains Milian's biggest hit single in the US to date, and her only one to reach the top 10 of the Billboard Hot 100.

== Legal issues ==
In August 2006, Milian sued the co-writer and producer of "Dip It Low", Poli Paul, claiming that Paul "very definitively" assured her that "there were no samples whatsoever in [...] 'Dip It Low'". The issue had arisen in February 2005, when Thomas Turino, Larry Crook, and Dan Dickey sued Milian over the song, claiming that it contained a sample from a track they released in 1983 called "La Sirena". The lawsuit claimed that Paul heard the album while in a record store, liked the tune and sampled twelve seconds of it for "Dip It Low". These twelve seconds are repeated in a loop throughout the entire song. This suit was successful and the plaintiffs recovered over a million dollars (after lawyer expenses) divided 40% for Turino (the composer of the theme of the song), and 30% each for Dickey and Crook. Milian claimed that she had to spend more than $300,000 defending herself in the case, which she settled in 2006, and wanted $300,000 plus damages from Paul and his associate, Spencer Cowlings Entertainment.

In November 2006, Paul countersued the Island Def Jam Music Group and its parent company, Universal Music Group. Paul alleged that Island Def Jam was "negligent in its obligation to obtain clearance and proper licensing for any copyrighted material" used on the album. In February 2006, a superior court judge ruled that Paul's attorneys had failed to file a sworn declaration in the given period of time, but allowed them to file an amended complaint. Paul's lawyers amended the countersuit and added Milian as a defendant, saying that she was also negligent and that she should compensate him for money he spent in the copyright action. In June 2006, Universal Music Group filed a breach-of-contract suit against Milian and Paul. The record label claimed it was forced to pay attorney fees as a result of the litigation between Milian and Paul. The suit also said that Paul owes the company attorneys' fees from an earlier federal court case involving "Dip It Low".

== Music video ==
The music video for "Dip It Low" was directed by Matthew Rolston. Milian is first seen sitting scantily-clad in an East Asian-themed room. She is solely wearing a bra and underwear with a robe and high heels. She dances and sings, and clips of her dressed in a sparkling green costume cut in throughout the video. She is seen in a revealing red dress, walking forward on a stage with two dancers and then begins to dance. One of the male dancers then pulls back the front of the dress, revealing a black dress underneath. Throughout the rest of the video she is shown being pulled through black paint in the black dress and continues to dance, in addition to impressive dance moves where she falls directly onto her back, unhurt. The video features a guest appearance from Kim Kardashian. The verse that features Fabolous is completely cut out in the video, and instead a dance sequence is shown.

Different versions of the music video were created to market different remixes of the song. These videos are nearly identical to the original video but feature separate footage of their respective featured artist. One video was produced for a version of the song which features German rapper Samy Deluxe. A reggaeton remix video of the song featuring Puerto Rican rapper Voltio was made, and an Asian remix video featuring Will Pan was shown on Channel V. Another version of the video features Russian rapper Detsl.

== Track listings ==
US 12-inch single
No.	Title	Producer(s)	Length
1.	"Dip It Low" (featuring Fabolous)	Poli Paul
2.	"Dip It Low" (featuring Shawnna)	Paul
3.	"Dip It Low"	Paul
4.	"Dip It Low" (instrumental)	Paul

UK CD1
No.	Title	Producer(s)	Length
1.	"Dip It Low"	Paul
2.	"Dip It Low" (featuring Shawnna)	Paul
3.	"Dip It Low" (Full Intention club)	Paul; Michael Gray^{[a]}; Jon Pearn^{[a]}
4.	"Dip It Low" (JJ Flores dub)	Paul; JJ Flores^{[a]}
5.	"Dip It Low" (JJ Flores "Double J" remix)	Paul; JJ Flores^{[a]}
6.	"Dip It Low" (the video)

UK CD2 and European CD single
No.	Title	Producer(s)	Length
1.	"Dip It Low"	Paul
2.	"Dip It Low" (featuring Fabolous)	Paul

UK 12-inch single
No.	Title	Producer(s)	Length
1.	"Dip It Low"	Paul
2.	"Dip It Low" (featuring Fabolous)	Paul
3.	"Dip It Low" (Full Intention club)	Paul; Gray^{[a]}; Pearn^{[a]}

Australian CD single
No.	Title	Producer(s)	Length
1.	"Dip It Low"	Paul
2.	"Dip It Low" (featuring Fabolous)	Paul
3.	"Dip It Low" (featuring Shawnna)	Paul
4.	"Dip It Low" (video)

Japanese CD single
No.	Title	Producer(s)	Length
1.	"Dip It Low"	Paul
2.	"Dip It Low" (featuring Fabolous)	Paul
3.	"Dip It Low" (featuring Shawnna)	Paul
4.	"Dip It Low" (featuring S-Word)	Paul

Notes

- ^{^[a]} denotes additional producer

== Personnel ==
Personnel are adapted from the It's About Time album booklet.

- Poli Paul – composition, production
- Teedra Moses – composition, background vocals
- Christina Milian – lead vocals, background vocals
- Collin Miller – recording engineering
- Manny Marroquin – mix engineering
- Matt Ward – additional and remix production
- Dean Gillard – additional and remix production
- Shaffer "Ne-Yo" Smith – vocal arrangement
- Fabolous – featured vocals

== Charts ==
=== Weekly charts ===
Weekly chart performance for "Dip It Low"
Chart (2004)	Peak position
Australia (ARIA)	31
Australian Urban (ARIA)	10
Austria (Ö3 Austria Top 40) Samy Deluxe version	32
Belgium (Ultratop 50 Flanders)	23
Belgium (Ultratop 50 Wallonia)	39
Canada CHR/Pop Top 30 (Radio & Records)	1
Denmark (Tracklisten)	8
Europe (Eurochart Hot 100)	8
Finland (Suomen virallinen lista) Samy Deluxe version	16
France (SNEP) Samy Deluxe version	31
Germany (GfK) Samy Deluxe version	17
Greece (IFPI)	27
Hungary (Dance Top 40)	17
Hungary (Editors' Choice Top 40)	21
Ireland (IRMA)	11
Italy (FIMI)	38
Netherlands (Dutch Top 40)	6
Netherlands (Single Top 100)	7
New Zealand (Recorded Music NZ)	7
Norway (VG-lista)	8
Romania (Romanian Top 100)	67
Scotland Singles (Official Charts)	8
Sweden (Sverigetopplistan) Samy Deluxe version	30
Switzerland (Schweizer Hitparade) Samy Deluxe version	11
UK Singles (Official Charts)	2
UK Hip Hop/R&B (Official Charts)	1
US Billboard Hot 100	5
US Dance Airplay (Billboard)	4
US Dance Club Songs (Billboard) Full Intention, JJ Flores, Tyas & Lawrence Mixes	1
US Dance Singles Sales (Billboard) Dance Remixes	2
US Hot R&B/Hip-Hop Songs (Billboard)	16
US Pop Airplay (Billboard)	2
US Rhythmic Airplay (Billboard)	5

=== Year-end charts ===
Year-end chart performance for "Dip It Low"
Chart (2004)	Position
Netherlands (Dutch Top 40)	44
Netherlands (Single Top 100)	59
New Zealand (RIANZ)	40
Switzerland (Schweizer Hitparade)	46
UK Singles (OCC)	37
UK Urban (Music Week)	35
US Billboard Hot 100	23
US Dance Club Play (Billboard)	35
US Dance Radio Airplay (Billboard)	5
US Dance Singles Sales (Billboard)	16
US Hot R&B/Hip-Hop Singles & Tracks (Billboard)	68
US Mainstream Top 40 (Billboard)	16
US Rhythmic Top 40 (Billboard)	19

== Certifications ==
Certifications for "Dip It Low"
Region	Certification	Certified units/sales
New Zealand (RMNZ)	Gold	15,000^{‡}
United Kingdom (BPI)	Gold	400,000^{‡}
United States (RIAA)	Gold	500,000^{‡}
^{‡} Sales+streaming figures based on certification alone.

== Release history ==
Release dates and formats for "Dip It Low"
Region	Version(s)	Date	Format(s)	Label(s)	Ref(s).
United States	Fabolous	March 8, 2004	Rhythmic contemporary radio	Island	
Japan	Solo	March 17, 2004	CD	Universal	
United States	Fabolous and Shawnna	April 5, 2004	Contemporary hit radio	Island	
United States	Various	April 13, 2004	12-inch vinyl	Island	
Australia	Solo	May 3, 2004	CD	Universal	
United Kingdom	Various	May 3, 2004	12-inch vinyl; CD	Island	
United States	Solo	June 21, 2004	Urban contemporary radio	Island	
United States	Dance remixes; Full Phat remixes	June 22, 2004	Digital download	Island	
Germany	Various	July 5, 2004	CD	Island	
