= Say I =

2006 single by Christina Milian

Single by Christina Milian featuring Young Jeezy

from the album So Amazin'
- Released: February 20, 2006
- Length: 3:33
- Label: Island Def Jam; Mercury
- Songwriters: Bunny Sigler; J. Jenkins; Phil Hurtt; Andre Lyon; Marcello Valenzano; Jazmine Sullivan
- Producer: Cool & Dre

Christina Milian singles chronology
"Whatever U Want" (2004)	"Say I" (2006)	"Us Against the World" (2008)

Young Jeezy singles chronology
"Get Throwed" (2006)	"Say I" (2006)	"Grew Up a Screw Up" (2006)

"Say I" is a song by American singer Christina Milian. It was written by Jazmine Sullivan, Jay Jenkins (at the time Young Jeezy, now simply known as Jeezy), Andre Lyon, and Marcello Valenzano and produced by Lyon and Valenzano under their production moniker Cool & Dre for her third studio album So Amazin' (2006). The song features additional vocals by Jeezy and is built around a sample of "Clean Up Your Own Yard" (1973) by American soul singer Jackie Moore. Due to the inclusion of the sample, its writers Bunny Sigler and Phil Hurtt are also credited as songwriters.

The song was released by Island Def Jam as the album's lead single in February 2006. It reached the top five in the Wallonian region of Belgium, the Netherlands, and the United Kingdom, and peaked at number 21 on the US Billboard Hot 100. An accompanying music video, directed by Ray Kay, was filmed in Los Angeles in February 2006. The official remix of "Say I" features rapper Juelz Santana.

== Music video ==
A music video for "Say I" was directed by Norwegian photographer Ray Kay and filmed over the weekend of February 16, 2006 in Los Angeles. Behind the scenes footage of the making of the video aired on March 1 on BET's making of series Access Granted.

== Track listings ==
Digital download
No.	Title	Producer(s)	Length
1.	"Say I" (featuring Young Jeezy)	Cool & Dre	3:33

CD single
No.	Title	Producer(s)	Length
1.	"Say I" (Radio Edit featuring Young Jeezy)	Cool & Dre	3:35
2.	"Say I" (Hani "Say I" Remix featuring Young Jeezy)	Cool & Dre; Hani^{[a]}	7:37

Maxi single
No.	Title	Producer(s)	Length
1.	"Say I" (Radio Edit featuring Young Jeezy)	Cool & Dre	3:35
2.	"Say I" (Maurice Say Mo Remix featuring Young Jeezy)	Cool & Dre; Maurice Joshua^{[a]}	6:26
3.	"Say I" (Hani "Say I" Remix featuring Young Jeezy)	Cool & Dre; Hani^{[a]}	7:37
4.	"Say I" (Music video)		3:32

Notes

- ^{^[a]} denotes additional producer

== Charts ==
=== Weekly charts ===
Chart (2006)	Peak position
Australia (ARIA)	45
Australian Urban (ARIA)	13
Austria (Ö3 Austria Top 40)	64
Belgium (Ultratop 50 Flanders)	43
Belgium (Ultratip Bubbling Under Wallonia)	2
Europe (European Hot 100 Singles)	10
Germany (GfK)	38
Global Dance Songs (Billboard)	20
Ireland (IRMA)	15
Netherlands (Dutch Top 40 Tipparade)	3
Netherlands (Single Top 100)	74
New Zealand (Recorded Music NZ)	23
Scotland Singles (OCC)	10
Switzerland (Schweizer Hitparade)	23
UK Singles (OCC)	4
UK Hip Hop/R&B (OCC)	5
US Billboard Hot 100	21
US Dance Club Songs (Billboard)	4
US Dance/Mix Show Airplay (Billboard)	25
US Hot R&B/Hip-Hop Songs (Billboard)	13
US Pop Airplay (Billboard)	35
US Rhythmic Airplay (Billboard)	18

=== Year-end charts ===
Chart (2006)	Position
UK Singles (OCC)	105
UK Urban (Music Week)	11
US Hot R&B/Hip-Hop Songs (Billboard)	73

== Release history ==
Region	Date	Format(s)	Label(s)	Ref.
United States	February 20, 2006	Urban radio	Island Def Jam	
United States	March 14, 2006	Rhythmic contemporary radio	Island Def Jam	
United States	April 24, 2006	Contemporary hit radio	Island Def Jam	
United Kingdom	May 15, 2006	CD	Island Def Jam; Mercury	
