= Between Me and You =

2000 single by Ja Rule

Single by Ja Rule featuring Christina Milian

from the album Rule 3:36
- B-side: "Die"
- Released: August 29, 2000
- Length: 4:02
- Label: Def Jam; Murder Inc.
- Songwriters: Jeffrey Atkins; Robin Mays; Irving Lorenzo
- Producers: Irv Gotti; Lil' Rob

Ja Rule singles chronology
"Daddy's Little Baby" (1999)	"Between Me and You" (2000)	"Put It on Me" (2000)

Christina Milian singles chronology
"Between Me and You" (2000)	"AM to PM" (2001)

"Between Me and You" is the first single from American rapper Ja Rule's second album, Rule 3:36. The single features Christina Milian and was released to US radio in August 2000 through Def Jam and Murder Inc. Records. The song was produced by Irv Gotti and Lil' Rob. It was Ja Rule's first major crossover hit, peaking at number 11 on the US Billboard Hot 100 singles chart and number 26 on the UK Singles Chart.

A version of "Between Me and You" also exists with Ja Rule singing the chorus instead of Milian. The official remix features a new verse by Ja Rule, Christina Milian's chorus, & verses by Murder Inc. artists Vita, Caddillac Tah, & Black Child. It was released on vinyl singles and the mixtape Features and Lost Tapes, Part 2.

== Charts ==
=== Weekly charts ===
Weekly chart performance for "Between Me and You"
Chart (2000–2001)	Peak position
Europe (Eurochart Hot 100)	91
Netherlands (Dutch Top 40 Tipparade)	2
Netherlands (Single Top 100)	48
Scotland Singles (OCC)	68
UK Singles (OCC)	26
UK Dance (OCC)	7
UK Hip Hop/R&B (OCC)	6
US Billboard Hot 100	11
US Hot R&B/Hip-Hop Songs (Billboard)	5
US Hot Rap Songs (Billboard)	11
US Rhythmic Airplay (Billboard)	3
US CHR/Pop (Radio & Records)	37
US CHR/Rhythmic (Radio & Records)	1

=== Year-end charts ===
2000 year-end chart performance of "Between Me and You"
Chart (2000)	Position
US Hot R&B/Hip-Hop Singles & Tracks (Billboard)	47
US Rhythmic Top 40 (Billboard)	46

2001 year-end chart performance of "Between Me and You"
Chart (2001)	Position
US Hot R&B/Hip-Hop Singles & Tracks (Billboard)	98
US Rhythmic Top 40 (Billboard)	31
