= AM to PM =

2001 single by Christina Milian

Single by Christina Milian

from the album Christina Milian
- B-side: "Between Me and You"
- Released: July 24, 2001
- Genre: R&B; pop
- Length: 3:51
- Label: Def Soul
- Songwriters: Christina Milian; Christian "Bloodshy" Karlsson; Pontus "Avant" Winberg
- Producer: Bloodshy and Avant

Christina Milian singles chronology
"Between Me and You" (2000)	"AM to PM" (2001)	"When You Look at Me" (2002)

"AM to PM" is a song by American singer and songwriter Christina Milian, released as her debut single. It was written by Milian, Christian Karlsson, and Pontus Winnberg and produced by the latter. It served as the lead single from her self-titled 2001 debut album and found commercial success in many countries, becoming a top-10 hit in Denmark, Flanders, Ireland, the Netherlands, Norway, and the United Kingdom.

== Release and promotion ==
Pushed by Milian's increasing prominence as a VJ on MTV, the single enjoyed worldwide success, reaching the top 10 in Denmark, Flanders, Ireland, the Netherlands, Norway, and the United Kingdom. Stateside, it peaked at number 27 on the Billboard Hot 100.

== Critical reception ==
Chuck Taylor from Billboard compared the song to the work of Destiny's Child and Christina Aguilera and felt that it may be "too entrenched in youth-pop to be taken seriously by those with an ear for the street". Nonetheless, he stated that "with its pop-ping production and chirpy vocal, this could be one of the bolder breakthroughs of the year".

== Music video ==
The music video for "AM to PM" was directed by Dave Meyers and premiered on Total Request Live on August 27, 2001. It starts with Milian waking up after going to bed that night. She then gets ready to leave the house, and decides to sneak out of the house. She turns off the alarm, hides from her mom, by hanging below the stairs. She stops the dog from barking by throwing him a bone and then exits the house. She grabs her backpack, which she had thrown out from the window in her room, and jumps in the backseat of her friends' car. She and her friends then go to a club, and they are able to skip the line by showing the bouncer a beeper that reads "AM to PM." She and her friends then proceed into the club and start to dance. They all dance and Milian dances on a stage with many background dancers. After Milian and her friends leave, she attempts to sneak back into her house. Her dad is reading the newspaper and the dog is barking again. She sees this and then runs around to enter the house through the backdoor. She sprints to her room and dives into her bed. Her dad checks on her, thinking that she's asleep, and she pretends to be. After he leaves, Milian says "from AM to PM," and the video ends.

Kevin Federline is featured in the main nightclub dance sequence throughout the video.

== Track listings ==
US CD single

1. "AM to PM" (album version) – 3:51
2. "Between Me and You" (with Ja Rule) – 4:24
3. "A Girl Like Me" (snippet) – 2:08
4. "You Make Me Laugh" (snippet) – 1:34
5. "When You Look at Me" (snippet) – 1:35
6. "It Hurts When..." (snippet) – 2:04
7. "Satisfaction Guaranteed" (snippet) – 2:34
8. "AM to PM" (video)

US 12-inch single

A1. "AM to PM" (Hex Hector/Mac Quayle club mix)
A2. "AM to PM" (E-Smoove house mix)
B1. "AM to PM" (E-Smoove 4 Da Heads dub)
B2. "AM to PM" (Richard F's Understair dub)

UK CD single

1. "AM to PM" (album version) – 3:51
2. "AM to PM" (Ignorants remix) – 4:18
3. "AM to PM" (E-Smoove house mix) – 7:22
4. "AM to PM" (video)

UK 12-inch single

A1. "AM to PM" (album version) – 3:51
A2. "AM to PM" (Ignorants remix) – 4:18
B1. "AM to PM" (E-Smoove house mix) – 7:22

UK cassette single and European CD single

1. "AM to PM" – 3:51
2. "AM to PM" (E-Smoove house mix) – 7:22

Australian CD single

1. "AM to PM" (radio edit) – 3:52
2. "AM to PM" (Irv Gotti's Gutta remix) – 3:35
3. "AM to PM" (Hex Hector/Mac Quayle club mix) – 6:19
4. "AM to PM" (E-Smoove house mix) – 7:20
5. "AM to PM" (video)

Japanese CD single

1. "AM to PM" (radio edit) – 3:53
2. "AM to PM" (Irv Gotti remix) – 3:37
3. "AM to PM" (instrumental) – 3:43

== Charts ==
=== Weekly charts ===
Chart (2001–2002)	Peak position
Australia (ARIA)	25
Australian Urban (ARIA)	6
Belgium (Ultratop 50 Flanders)	9
Belgium (Ultratop 50 Wallonia)	31
Denmark (Tracklisten)	4
Europe (Eurochart Hot 100)	16
Finland (Suomen virallinen lista)	17
France (SNEP)	53
Germany (GfK)	59
Ireland (IRMA)	6
Italy (FIMI)	39
Netherlands (Dutch Top 40)	6
Netherlands (Single Top 100)	8
Norway (VG-lista)	7
Romania (Romanian Top 100)	69
Scottish Singles Sales (Official Charts)	5
Sweden (Sverigetopplistan)	16
Switzerland (Schweizer Hitparade)	28
UK Singles (Official Charts)	3
UK Hip Hop/R&B (Official Charts)	2
US Billboard Hot 100	27
US Dance Club Songs (Billboard)	13
US Hot R&B/Hip-Hop Songs (Billboard)	58
US Pop Airplay (Billboard)	21
US Rhythmic Airplay (Billboard)	24
US Top 40 Tracks (Billboard)	35

=== Year-end charts ===
Chart (2001)	Position
Netherlands (Dutch Top 40)	100
Netherlands (Single Top 100)	81
US Mainstream Top 40 (Billboard)	82

Chart (2002)	Position
Belgium (Ultratop 50 Flanders)	74
Ireland (IRMA)	65
UK Singles (OCC)	79
UK Airplay (Music Week)	73

== Certifications ==
Region	Certification	Certified units/sales
Norway (IFPI Norway)	Gold	
United Kingdom (BPI)	Silver	200,000^{‡}
^{‡} Sales+streaming figures based on certification alone.

== Release history ==
Region	Date	Format(s)	Label(s)	Ref.
United States	July 24, 2001	Contemporary hit; rhythmic contemporary radio	Def Soul	
United States	September 11, 2001	CD	Def Soul	
Australia	November 26, 2001	CD	Universal Music Australia	
United Kingdom	January 14, 2002	12-inch vinyl; CD; cassette	Def Soul	
Japan	January 17, 2002	CD	Universal Music Japan	
