= Bratz (surname) =

Bratz is a German surname. Notable people with the surname include:

- Jens-Halvard Bratz (1920–2005), Norwegian businessman and politician
- Mike Bratz (born 1955), American retired basketball player
- Emilie Bratz, better known by her maiden name Emilie da Fonseca (1803-1884), 19th-century Norwegian actress and opera singer
