= Romeo (English rapper) =

British rapper (born 1979)

- Also known as: Romeo; MC Romeo
- Born: Marvin Dawkins; 23 October 1980 (age 45)
- Origin: Battersea, London, England
- Genres: UK garage, grime, hip-hop
- Occupations: Rapper, MC
- Years active: 1998–present
- Labels: Relentless Records (2002–2003); Maffia Recordz
- Member of: So Solid Crew

Marvin Dawkins (born 23 October 1980), better known by his stage name Romeo, Nigel, or MC Romeo, is a British rapper and MC.

== Biography ==
Romeo first found fame in the garage group So Solid Crew, having grown up on and around the notorious Surrey Lane, Winstanley and Badric Court estates of Battersea. He subsequently had a solo career. He got his name Romeo due to his smoothness with the ladies.

Romeo released his solo album Solid Love in November 2002, through Relentless records, the label that So Solid had just left for Independiente.

He enjoyed two top 10 singles, "Romeo Dunn'em" which reached No. 3 in the UK Singles Chart in 2002, and secondly a duet with Christina Milian, "It's All Gravy", which reached No. 9 in the UK Singles Chart in the same year.

However, only a disappointing 40,000 copies sold of his album, peaking at No. 46 in the UK Albums Chart. In March 2003, Relentless filed for bankruptcy with debts of £3m.

In 2004, Romeo appeared in the reality show The Games, and returned to the series to compete in the Champion of Champions contest in 2006. Romeo also featured in a gameshow called Fool Around With... Romeo on Channel 4 in 2005, in which he had to guess which girl out of four was single.

In August 2004, Romeo was charged with wounding with intent to cause grievous bodily harm and violent disorder after slashing the face of Ejay Armstrong with a knife when it was alleged that he joined friends in a dispute after a night out in London's Leicester Square. In June 2005, the jury failed to reach a verdict against him and the prosecution was suspended. During the retrial in November 2005, he told the jury that he had been trying to act as peacemaker and was found not guilty of wounding with intent when the prosecution decided not to continue the case.

Romeo appeared in an episode of Don't Tell the Bride on BBC Three on 22 September 2009, as the best man for his brother, Darnell Dawkins.

Romeo is currently signed to So Solid's Lisa Maffia's record label, Maffia Recordz. A second album, announced for release during 2008, has not yet materialised. In 2009, Romeo and fellow members of So Solid Crew attempted a musical comeback with the single "Since You Went Away".

Romeo appeared in Celebrity Big Brother 2012 up until his eviction on 25 January 2012 just narrowly missing out on the final.

== Discography ==
=== Albums ===
==== Studio albums ====
Title	Album details	Peak chart positions	Certifications
Title	Album details	UK	Certifications
Solid Love	Released: 11 November 2002; Label: Relentless; Formats: CD, cassette	46	UK: Silver

=== Singles ===
Song	Year	Peak chart positions	Album
Song	Year	UK	Album
"Romeo Dunn" (featuring Lisa Maffia, Thug Angel & Tiger S)	2002	3	Solid Love
"It's All Gravy" (featuring Christina Milian)	2002	9	Solid Love

==== As a featured artist ====
Song	Year	Peak chart positions	
Song	Year	UK	UK Dance
"No Good 4 Me" (Oxide & Neutrino featuring Megaman, Romeo & Lisa Maffia)	2000	6	
"Nasty" (AC Burrell featuring Mega & Romeo)	2000/02	84	10
"I See Girls (Crazy)" (Studio B featuring Romeo & Harry Brooks)	2003	52	
"Since You Went Away" (So Solid featuring Lisa Maffia & Romeo)	2010	82	
"Don't Stop the Music" (Lisa Maffia featuring Romeo & Tyler Daley)	2012	12	
