= Whatever U Want =

2004 single by Christina Milian

Single by Christina Milian featuring Joe Budden

from the album It's About Time
- Released: September 20, 2004
- Genre: R&B
- Length: 3:49
- Label: Island; Def Jam
- Songwriters: Bradley Spalter; Lambert Waldrip II; Aleese Simmons; Andre Morton; Khaleef Chiles; James Banks; Henderson Thigpen
- Producers: Bradley & Stereo

Christina Milian singles chronology
"Dip It Low" (2004)	"Whatever U Want" (2004)	"Say I" (2006)

Joe Budden singles chronology
"Fire (Yes, Yes Y'all)" (2003)	"Whatever U Want" (2004)	"Gangsta Party" (2005)

Music video
- "Whatever U Want" on YouTube

"Whatever U Want" is a song recorded by American singer Christina Milian. It was written by Bradley Spalter, Lambert Waldrip II, Aleese Simmons, Andre Mortion, Khaleef Chiles, James Banks, and Henderson Thigpen and produced by Bradley & Stereo for Milian's second album, It's About Time (2004), featuring a rap verse by rapper Joe Budden. "Whatever U Want" was released as the album's second and final single on September 20, 2004. It stalled at number 100 on the US Billboard Hot 100 but peaked within the top 10 of the UK Singles Chart.

== Track listings ==
UK CD1

1. "Whatever U Want" (radio version)
2. "Whatever U Want" (radio version without rap)

UK CD2

1. "Whatever U Want" (radio version)
2. "Whatever U Want" (DJ Cipha Sounds remix)
3. "Whatever U Want" (JJ Flores Old Skool radio)
4. "Whatever U Want" (Kriya & Velez radio edit)
5. "Whatever U Want" (Roy Davis & Tomi Deep soul remix)
6. "Whatever U Want" (video)

European CD single

1. "Whatever U Want" (featuring Joe Budden)
2. "Whatever U Want" (JJ Flores Old Skool extended mix)

European maxi-CD single

1. "Whatever U Want" (featuring Joe Budden)
2. "Whatever U Want" (Jack D. Elliot Amped remix)
3. "Whatever U Want" (DJ Cipha Sounds remix)
4. "Whatever U Want" (video)

== Charts ==
=== Weekly charts ===
Chart (2004)	Peak position
Austria (Ö3 Austria Top 40)	62
Belgium (Ultratop 50 Flanders)	30
Belgium (Ultratip Bubbling Under Wallonia)	3
Germany (GfK)	51
Ireland (IRMA)	16
Italy (FIMI)	32
Netherlands (Dutch Top 40)	16
Netherlands (Single Top 100)	20
Romania (Romanian Top 100)	51
Scotland Singles (Official Charts)	13
Switzerland (Schweizer Hitparade)	27
UK Singles (Official Charts)	9
UK Hip Hop/R&B (Official Charts)	1
US Billboard Hot 100	100
US Dance Airplay (Billboard)	23
US Dance Club Songs (Billboard)	6
US Dance Singles Sales (Billboard)	4
US Hot R&B/Hip-Hop Songs (Billboard)	91
US Pop Airplay (Billboard)	35
US Rhythmic Airplay (Billboard)	40

=== Year-end charts ===
Chart (2004)	Position
UK Singles (OCC)	186
UK Urban (Music Week)	38

== Release history ==
Region	Date	Format(s)	Label(s)	Ref.
United States	September 20, 2004	Rhythmic contemporary; contemporary hit radio	Island; Def Jam	
United Kingdom	October 4, 2004	12-inch vinyl; CD	Island Def Jam	
