= Christina Milian =

American actress, songwriter and singer (born 1981)

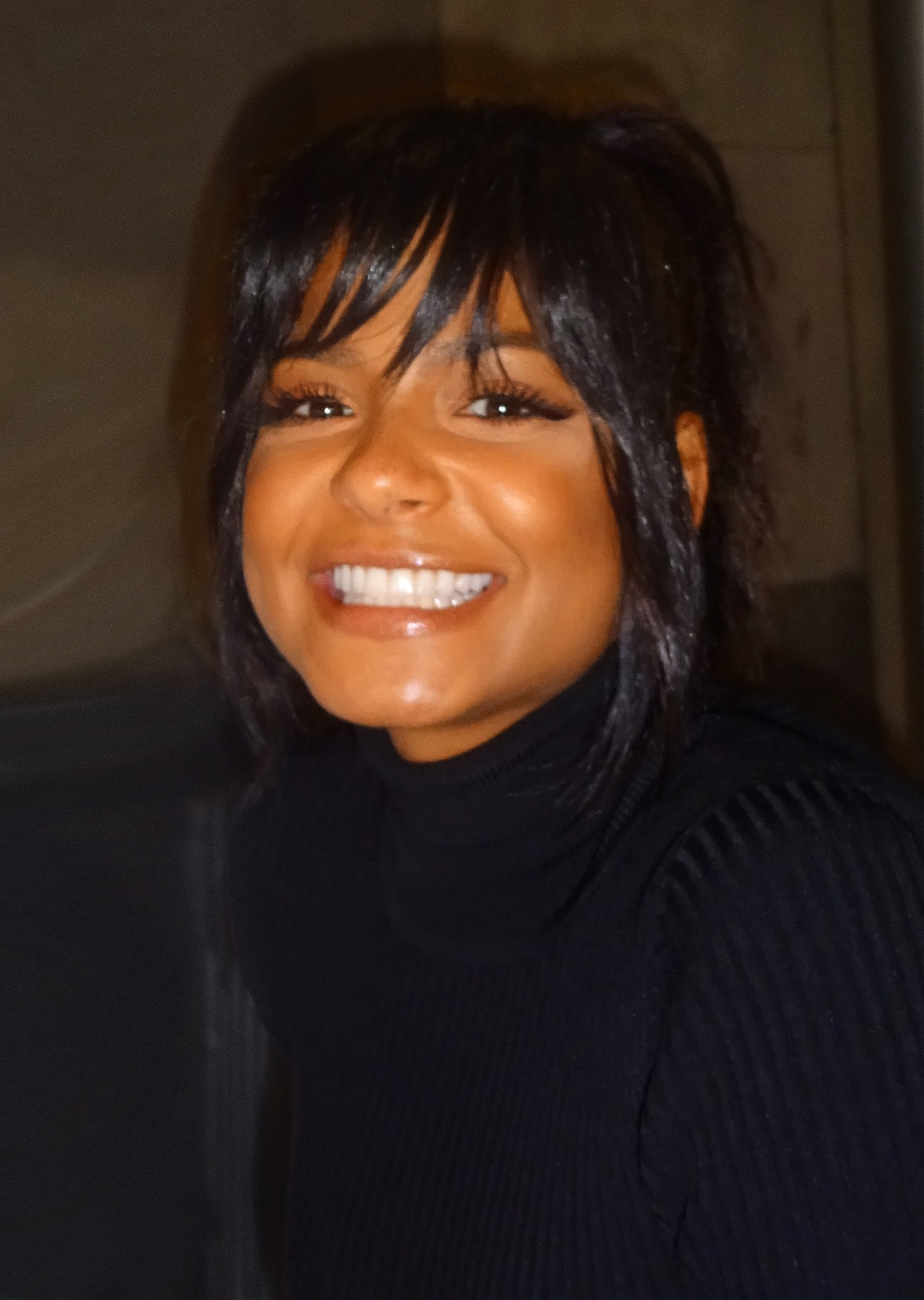
- Milian in 2016
- Born: Christina Flores; September 26, 1981 (age 45); Jersey City, New Jersey, U.S.
- Other name: Christina Flores-Nash
- Occupations: Actress; songwriter; singer
- Years active: 1996–present
- Spouses: The-Dream (m. 2009; div. 2011) M. Pokora (m. 2020)
- Children: 3
- Awards: Full list
- Musical career
- Origin: Waldorf, Maryland, U.S.
- Genres: R&B; pop; hip hop; dance
- Instrument: Vocals
- Labels: Milianheiress Music; Def Jam; Def Soul; Interscope; Island; MySpace; Young Money
- Website: christinamilian.com

Christina Milian (/ˌmɪliˈɑːn/ MIL-ee-AHN, née Flores; born September 26, 1981) is an American singer, songwriter, and actress. Following a number of minor television and film roles in the late 1990s, Milian made her recording debut on American rapper Ja Rule's 2000 single "Between Me and You", which peaked at number 11 on the Billboard Hot 100.

Under Island Records, she released her 2001 debut single "AM to PM", which peaked within the top 40 of the Billboard Hot 100. In 2002, she performed the theme song ("Call Me, Beep Me!") for the Disney Channel animated series Kim Possible. Following a series of delays, her debut studio album, Christina Milian (2002), was released to moderate commercial reception. Her second album, It's About Time (2004), spawned the Billboard Hot 100 top-five hit "Dip It Low" (featuring Fabolous). Her third album, So Amazin' (2006), yielded the US top-40 single, "Say I" (featuring Jeezy). Milian experienced particular success in the United Kingdom, where each of her songs released under Island peaked within the top 10 on the UK Singles Chart. She parted ways with Island following the release of the last album, and self-released her first extended play, 4U, in 2015.

As an actress, her first lead film role was in Love Don't Cost a Thing (2003). She subsequently had lead roles in the films Be Cool (2005) and Pulse (2006), and in the direct-to-DVD film Bring It On: Fight to the Finish (2009). Milian also starred in the ABC Family Original Movie Christmas Cupid (2010). From 2015 to 2016, she starred in the sitcom Grandfathered. She played María LaGuerta in the series Dexter: Original Sin (2024–2025). Milian also co-founded and co-owns Beignet Box, a dessert shop in the Los Angeles area.

== Early life ==
Christina Flores was born on September 26, 1981, Jersey City, New Jersey, and is of Cuban descent. Her parents are Don Flores and Carmen Milian.

Flores changed her name and adopted her mother's maiden name (Milian) in the hopes of landing a wider range of acting roles. The oldest of three sisters, including Danielle and Elizabeth, she moved with her family to Waldorf, Maryland, soon after her birth. Milian was four years old when she showed an interest in show business, and when her family realized that she was a talented actress, she determined to pursue a career in entertainment. As a child, Milian was "very imaginative and very creative", and watching television and listening to the radio became her life. They inspired her to have fun, and she convinced her parents that she "wanted to be inside the TV", although convincing them took some time. By the time she was nine years old, Milian had begun auditioning with local talent agencies, shot commercials for Wendy's and Honeycomb, and played the lead role in the musical Annie. Milian's mother supported her daughter's potential and left her husband and moved to Los Angeles with her three daughters when Milian was 13 years old. Her father had to stay in Maryland and divorced her mother soon after the move.

When Milian moved to Los Angeles, her first desire was to be an actress. She had always also wanted to be in the record business, but did not know how to obtain a recording contract. During this time, she was a host for Disney Channel's series Movie Surfers, by the name of Tina. After living in Los Angeles for six months, Milian moved into the same apartment complex as songwriter and producer Rodney "Darkchild" Jerkins, who (like Milian) was also born in New Jersey. Jerkins heard about Milian from a boy band with which he was working and once he heard her sing, they began working together. For a year and a half, Milian went into a studio every day and worked with Jerkins, which is how she started meeting people in the record business. She began writing songs at the age of 17 because she needed a demonstration recording (demo) to help her obtain a recording contract. According to Milian, every time she recorded a song, the producer would refuse to give her the demo or would write lyrics with which she did not agree. She felt that she had to write a song, record a demo, and send it out on her own.

== Career ==
=== 2000–2002: Christina Milian, record deal and acting debut ===
Milian's first major acting role was offered by the Disney Channel to join The Mickey Mouse Club, but she did not accept and opted to star as a reporter on Movie Surfers. During this time, she had minor roles in film and television, including Sister, Sister, Smart Guy, The Steve Harvey Show, Get Real, The Wood and American Pie. Milian made her first professional musical appearance on rapper Ja Rule's second studio album Rule 3:36 (2000), performing vocals on the song "Between Me and You". The song was released as the album's lead single in 2000, peaking at number 11 on the Billboard Hot 100, and on the top 30 of the UK Singles Chart in the United Kingdom. Milian co-wrote and performed vocals for the track "Play" for Jennifer Lopez's album J. Lo (2001), and co-wrote "Same Ol' Same Ol'", the second single from girl group PYT's debut album PYT (Down with Me) (2001).

Milian's collaboration with Ja Rule led to a record deal with Def Soul Records, prompted by his affiliation with Murder Inc. Records, an imprint that was distributed through Def Jam, the parent label of Def Soul Records. She travelled to Sweden and recorded her self-titled debut album. The album was released outside North America on January 23, 2002, peaking at number 23 on the UK Albums Chart in the United Kingdom. The album's domestic release was canceled, primarily due to the September 11 attacks. Two singles were taken from the album, "AM to PM" and "When You Look at Me", both of which charted worldwide. A music video for the track "Get Away" was filmed in Paris, although it was not officially released as a single. Critical response to the album was generally mixed to positive. In the following years, she was featured on the track "It's All Gravy", a duet with British rapper Romeo, which peaked at number nine on the UK Singles Chart, becoming Milian's third top ten song in Britain as a credited artist, and fourth overall; provided the theme song for the hit Disney Channel animated series Kim Possible, "Call Me, Beep Me!"; and collaborated with Hilary Duff on the song "I Heard Santa on the Radio" for Duff's debut album Santa Claus Lane (2002).

"I'm kind of happy that I was never the successful actress that went into music. But now that people know me for my music, it's definitely worked out for my acting career."

— Milian on her music and acting careers.

In 2002, Milian was appointed the host of the live competitive music series Becoming Presents: Wannabe on MTV, where she met director Joseph Kahn. Kahn suggested she audition for a lead role in the film Torque. Her audition was successful and she played a supporting role in the film. She was subsequently cast in her first lead role in Love Don't Cost a Thing.

=== 2003–2004: It's About Time and continued acting ===
Milian felt that Island Def Jam was confused as to how they wanted her image to be portrayed. In 2003, Milian's label, Def Soul, later shifted its focus into R&B veterans under its Def Soul Classics faction; Def Soul would later be folded into its parent, Def Jam, in 2011. However, Milian would later be drafted to sister label Island Records. After the international release of her debut album, Milian went back into the recording studio. The singer felt that music trends had changed into rock music, hardcore hip hop and tribute songs, and her music did not fall into those categories. Milian decided to stop recording and toured overseas for a year and a half. When she returned to the US, she decided not to release her previous album domestically, and started working on a new album. Milian traveled the world, working with the popular producers Bloodshy & Avant, "Darkchild", Cory Rooney, Warryn Campbell, Bryan-Michael Cox and Polli Paul. Milian also appeared in the video game Def Jam Vendetta (2003), where she plays non-playable character Angeline "Angel" Rodriguez.

Milian's second studio album, It's About Time, was released in the US on July 13, 2004. The critical response to the album was mixed; the club tracks, most notably lead single "Dip It Low", were praised while the ballads were said to be disappointing. The style and sound of the album was compared to that of Beyoncé and Jennifer Lopez by several critics. Milian later admitted that her new sexy image for "Dip It Low" and the whole album was mainly for shock value. She had to make her way back into the US market, and by choosing a sexier image, she made a name for herself. "Dip It Low" was also meant to show that she was not the same 18-year-old girl in the "AM to PM" video. To create her new image, Milian also decided to change her appearance and lightened her hair. Taking inspiration from Janet Jackson who constantly changed her image, Milian thought to herself, "'When did I like Janet Jackson the most?' It was when she had her lightened hair."

Milian believed that the album was more R&B when compared to her "bubble-gum" pop debut album. The change was reflected in the album's lead single, "Dip It Low", which was more of a club and R&B track than her previous pop release "AM to PM". Milian performed as an opening act on Usher's Truth tour to promote her album. The album debuted and peaked at number 14 on the Billboard 200, and number 21 on the UK Albums Chart, selling a total of 382,000 and 63,708 copies respectively, and received a Grammy Award nomination for Best Contemporary R&B Album in 2005. The album's first single, "Dip It Low", became Milian's biggest hit to date, peaking at number five on the Billboard Hot 100, and number two on the UK Singles Chart. The single was certified Gold by the RIAA for digital sales, and earned a Grammy Award nomination for Best Rap/Sung Collaboration. The album's second and final single, "Whatever U Want", featuring Joe Budden, failed to reprise the success of the lead single. "Whatever U Want" was more successful in the United Kingdom, where the song peaked at number nine on the UK Singles Chart in October 2004.

=== 2005–2006: So Amazin' and label departure ===
Milian starred in Be Cool (2005), the sequel to Get Shorty, with John Travolta and Uma Thurman, and recorded two songs for its soundtrack. She was then cast in a lead role in the horror film Pulse, starring alongside Kristen Bell and Ian Somerhalder. The film was a remake of the Japanese film Kairo (2001), and was adapted by Wes Craven and Ray Wright. Filming took place in Romania, a traumatic time for Milian, where she endured racial abuse and discovered that boyfriend Nick Cannon was cheating on her. The same year, Milian was awarded with a humanitarian award at The Reign fundraiser from the Elton John AIDS Foundation for being a role model for young children. Milian said, "I've never been rewarded that way and never been acknowledged like that. That was really nice of them, and I was happy I was able to show up for the kids."

Whereas Milian's previous albums had pop and R&B stylings, she was encouraged by Island Def Jam to target a new audience and release an urban record. L.A. Reid suggested to Milian that she should work with Cool & Dre, with whom she ended up working with as the first people to start off the album. Although Milian was originally supposed to work with several different music producers, she felt that the chemistry they had in the first week was so "instant and real" that she felt she could not get a better "vibe" with anybody else other than them. Milian ended up working with Cool & Dre on the majority of the production of the album, producing ten of the album's eleven tracks together. The album was completed within a three-month period.

Milian's third studio album, So Amazin', was released on May 16, 2006. The album's lead single, "Say I", featured rapper Young Jeezy. The single saw peak positions of number four in the UK, and number twenty-one in the US. So Amazin' debuted and peaked at number eleven on the Billboard 200 albums chart, selling 54,000 copies in its first week and 163,000 copies in total. Internationally, the album peaked at number 55 on the Swiss Albums Chart, 67 on the UK Albums Chart, and 139 on the France Albums Chart. Reviews of So Amazin' were mixed; critics felt that while Milian claimed that she was displaying the various sides of her personality, the album could "only [scratch] the surface of who she really is." "Say I" was praised by several critics, and was described as "instantly rousing" and "intoxicating". In June 2006, Milian's representative confirmed that Island had released her from the imprint. In an interview with Rap-Up, Milian revealed she was dropped a week after her album was released. The singer believed it was a "budget cut", and that Island Def Jam wanted to spend more money on label mate Rihanna; Milian also turned down what would later be Rihanna's hit single, "SOS". She said, "it was embarrassing. It was a week after my album got put out. I would be in my room a lot of the time crying by myself." After leaving Def Jam, Milian released her first compilation album, The Best of Christina Milian (2006).

=== 2007–2010: Canceled album and continued acting ===
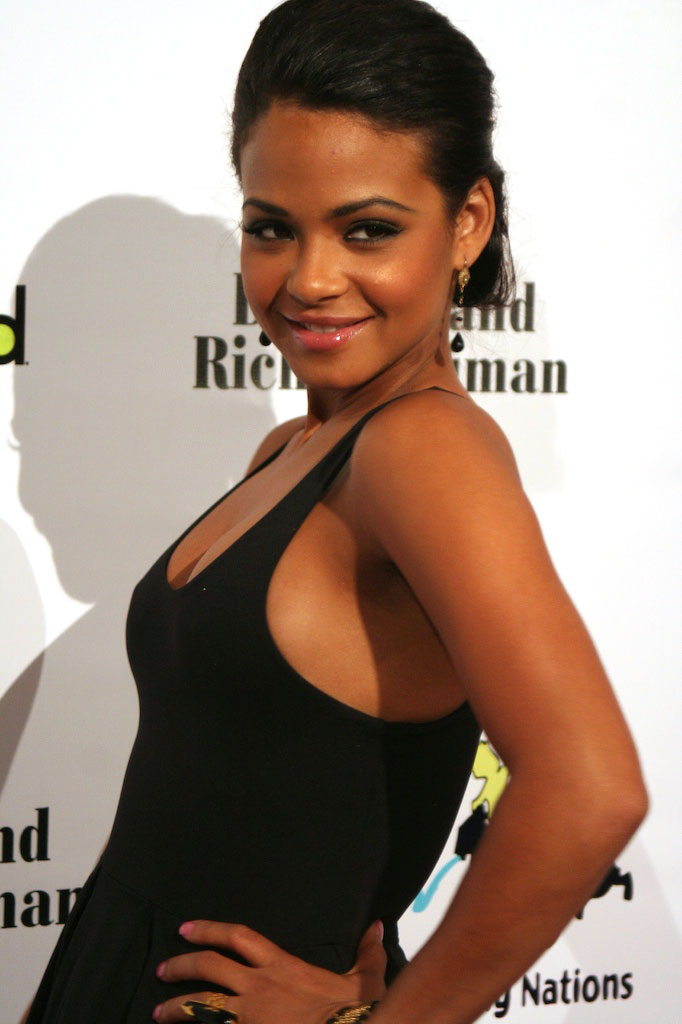
Milian in 2008

In 2007, Milian worked with the Children Uniting Nations charity, in which she was a big sister to foster children. In May, it was reported that she was to be a leading character in The CW's show Eight Days a Week as Olivia, alongside Mario Lopez, but The CW decided not to pick up the series due to the Writers Guild of America strike. In December, Milian starred as the main character in the Christmas television movie for the ABC Family channel entitled Snowglobe, alongside Lorraine Bracco. That year, Milian began working on material for her fourth studio album, first announced to be titled Dream in Color in 2008 but retitled as Elope the following year. She collaborated with numerous producers, including Cool & Dre, J. R. Rotem, The Runners, Danja, Terry "MaddScientist" Thomas, T-Pain, Jim Jonsin and Toby Gad.

Milian signed with MySpace Records in 2008. The single "Us Against the World" premiered via MySpace on October 6, 2008, and was made available by digital download the next day. Milian appeared in the video game Need for Speed: Undercover (2008) as one of the female leads, Carmen Mendez.

In early 2009, Milian began working with The-Dream, Tricky Stewart, and L.O.S. Da Maestro, which led to her signing a deal with Radio Killa Records. Milian revealed that aside from "Us Against the World", The-Dream and Tricky Stewart would be producing all the songs on her album. In June 2009, The-Dream said that the album was finished. Upon completion of the album, Milian said it represented "independence, not having to answer to any type of 'authority', being a woman at her best and feeling very confident". In August 2009, Milian confirmed that she had signed a deal to release Elope through Interscope Records with a 2010 release date. Milian became romantically involved with The-Dream, and the pair eloped that September. Milian announced that she was pregnant, and in October, it was reported that the album had been postponed. The pair separated in late 2009, only three months after their wedding. Despite the separation, Milian and The-Dream continued to "work together and write together". That year, Milian had a minor role in Ghosts of Girlfriends Past alongside Matthew McConaughey, and starred as the lead role in the straight-to-DVD film Bring It On: Fight to the Finish.

In January 2010, Milian said that she was going back into the studio in the summer to record more material. Although the album had already been finished, she wanted to "go back and re-do some of the music and make some new songs and find my new inspiration". At the 2010 Los Angeles Fashion Week, Milian performed "Dip It Low" and the new song "Zipper". At the 2010 American Music Awards, she said the album would be ready in 2011. In September 2011, however, she confirmed that the material recorded for Elope would not be released, and the album was ultimately shelved.

=== 2010–present: Return to music, The Voice and Dancing with the Stars ===
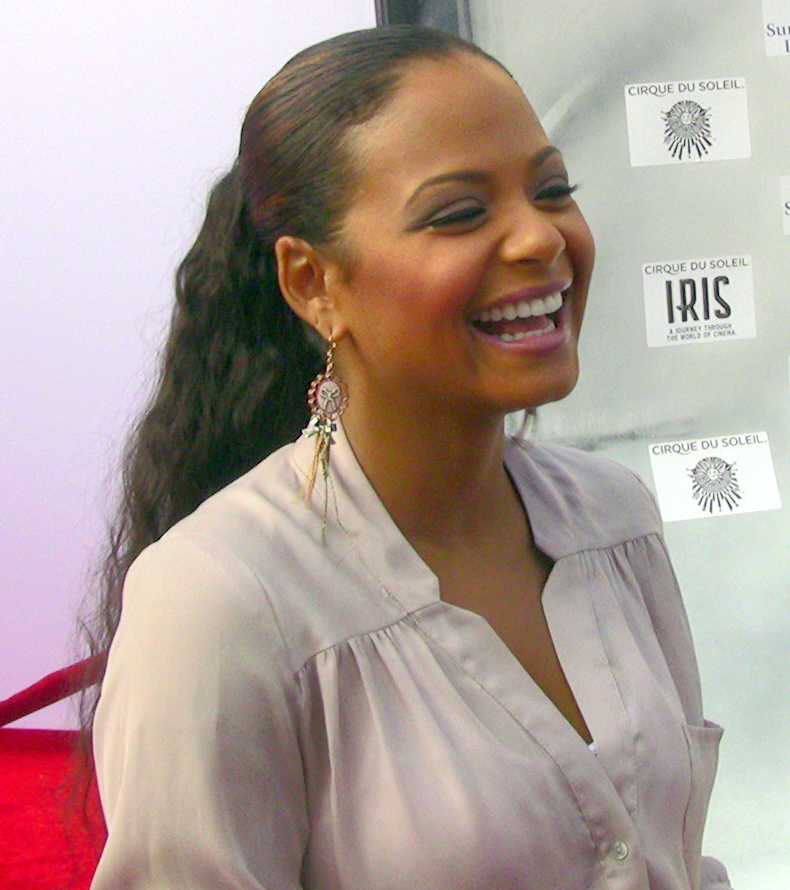
Milian at the premiere of Iris by Cirque du Soleil in 2011

In June 2011, her collaboration with The Jackie Boyz titled "Memory" was released in Japan. It appeared on their album Songs In My Blackberry. NBC announced on October 27 that Milian would serve as the official Social Media Correspondent for The Voice during its second season. The role saw Milian make regular appearances during the live broadcasts. Milian maintained the role through its fourth season.

On February 12, 2012, Christina Milian parted ways with Radio Killa Records and signed with Young Money. The next day, a song titled "Mr. Valentine" leaked onto the internet. In May 2013, she collaborated with the Stafford Brothers and Lil' Wayne on the single "Hello" which reached the Top 15 on the Billboard Dance charts. In September 2013, Milian became a contestant on Dancing with the Stars (season 17). She was partnered with professional dancer Mark Ballas. She was eliminated in the fifth week, finishing in ninth place. In November 2014, she collaborated with Lil' Wayne on his single, "Start a Fire", which they performed on the American Music Awards.

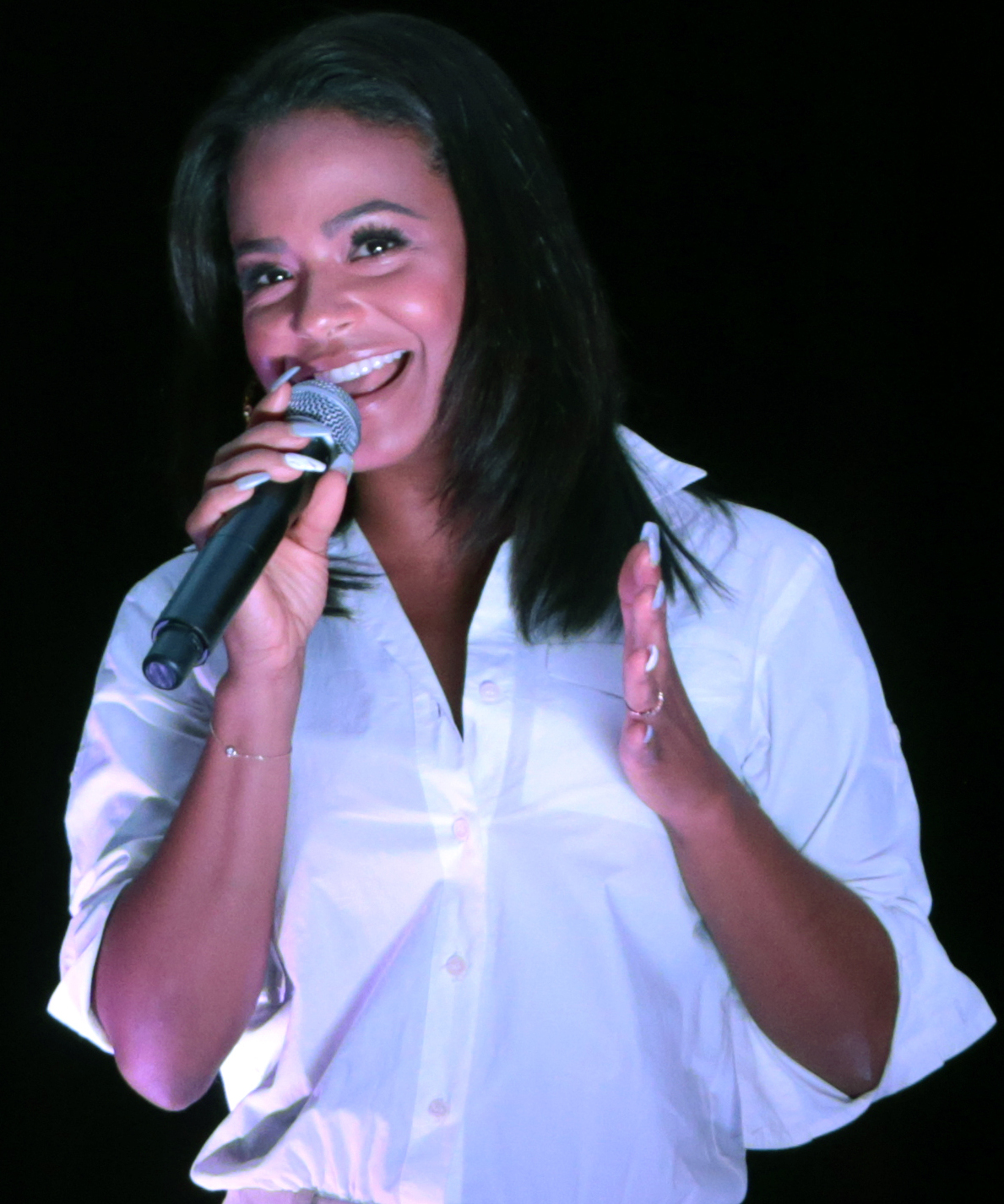
Milian speaking at the 2016 Arizona Ultimate Women's Expo at the Phoenix Convention Center in Phoenix, Arizona

On January 18, 2015, Milian's reality show, Christina Milian Turned Up, premiered on E!. The series follows the day-to-day lives of Christina, her mother Carmen and her two sisters, Danielle and Liz Flores. It was renewed for a second season in April, which premiered in November 2015. In March, she released the singles "Rebel" and "We Ain't Worried"; the latter was used to promote her "We Are Pop Culture" clothing line. In July, she announced she was going to release a 5-track EP and video set, and was working with director Mike Ho. That month, she performed the National Anthem at the 2015 Americafest and premiered a new single "Like Me" featuring Snoop Dogg. A few months later, she released another single "Do It" with Lil' Wayne. Her EP 4U was released on December 4, 2015. The EP was released independently through her own label, Milianheiress Music, though she remained signed to Young Money.

In 2016, she collaborated with So Solid Crew's MC Harvey on the dance track "We Own the Night" which premiered on August 12, 2016. In June 2017, she appeared as a judge/panelist on the Fox television show, Superhuman.

In 2019, Milian starred in the Netflix romantic comedy Falling Inn Love (2019), costarring Adam Demos. Falling Inn Love was the first Netflix movie to be shot entirely in New Zealand. In 2023 she joined the Netflix romantic comedy, Meet Me Next Christmas, as executive producer and cast member. The film was released in November 2024 on the streaming plattform. In 2024, Milian was cast as María LaGuerta in Dexter-prequel television show Dexter: Original Sin.

Milian co-owns Viva Diva Wines with her mother and manager Carmen Milian.

== Personal life ==
=== Heritage ===
Milian has faced challenges regarding her Cuban-American identity and how she is perceived by others due to her Afro-Latina heritage, stating:

I'm Cuban but [people] didn't get it because I was also brown-skinned... Latinos come in all colors, all shades... You should see my mom and her brothers and sisters... We just vary in color, shapes and sizes. But we're still Latinos — that doesn't change a damn thing.

=== Relationships and children ===
Milian met actor Nick Cannon on the set of their film, Love Don't Cost a Thing, in 2003, and they began dating. After being together for two and a half years, Milian ended her relationship with Cannon in 2005 because of his infidelity.

After the production of So Amazin' in 2006, Milian began dating Andre Lyon from the production group Cool & Dre. The pair dated until February 2009.

In February 2009, reports emerged that Milian was dating musician The-Dream. In late May 2009, it was reported that Milian and The-Dream would marry; the couple celebrated their engagement in Las Vegas in June. On September 4, 2009, Milian and The-Dream eloped and were married at the Little White Chapel in Las Vegas, Nevada. MTV reported that Milian and The-Dream would get married again in Rome, Italy, and then renew their vows in the US in front of family and friends. On September 11, 2009, it was announced that Milian and The-Dream were expecting their first child together. The pair separated in late 2009, after only three months. On February 26, 2010, Milian gave birth to a daughter. This was Milian's first child, and the fourth for The-Dream, who had three children with ex-wife Nivea. As a Catholic, she baptized her daughter into the faith. Two years after she and The-Dream separated, their divorce became finalized on October 23, 2011.

In September 2010, Milian began dating James "Jas" Prince Jr., son of impresario James Prince, the founder and CEO of Rap-A-Lot Records. In April 2013, Milian and Prince became engaged. However, she moved out of the couple's home on June 19, 2014, and the couple called off their engagement.

In July 2014, it was rumored she was dating rapper Lil Wayne, with whom she attended the ESPY Awards. They later confirmed their relationship in mid-2015. They split in August 2015 after collaborating on various singles, videos, and concert dates.

Milian has been in a relationship with French singer M. Pokora since 2017. In July 2019, the couple announced they were expecting a baby boy together, who was born in January 2020. In December 2020, the couple announced they were expecting their second child together, and they were also married that month. In April 2021, they welcomed their second son. Since 2023, Milian has been living in France. She and her family previously lived in Hollywood before relocating to Paris.

== Artistry ==
Milian possesses a soprano vocal range. Her vocal style has been compared to Paula Abdul and Aaliyah by critics. David Peisner of Maxim commented on her talent and described her voice as being "silky and sassy." Earlier in her career, Milian was mainly an urban pop and teen pop singer but as she matured and grew her sound later grew to branch out into a more hip hop soul and straight forward R&B sound on her later two releases It's About Time (2004) and So Amazin' (2006).

Milian described the sound of the album as "hip hop under-toned with nice, pop melodies", and later said the genre of the album was "bubble-gum pop". She described lead single "AM to PM" as a "very pop" and "fun, party/club song". The genre of the album was described by one critic as "light-hearted, energetic R&B pop tunes". Sonically, the album was said to stick "rigidly to the sherbert-snorting pop formula of Britney Spears and Christina Aguilera". One reviewer compared Milian to other singers of her generation, and found that "while Spears has gone raunchy with 'I Love Rock 'n' Roll', Christina Aguilera down and dirty on Stripped, and even clean-cut Mandy Moore has brashly cut her hair Felicity-style, Milian still seems young and real." The critic also compared Milian to Beyoncé, "while Beyonce is shaking her bootylicious body like crazy on 'Crazy In Love', Milian is simply enjoying becoming a young star." Milian described the genre of It's About Time as more R&B in comparison to her "bubble-gum pop" debut album. Discussing the change of genre between her lead singles, Milian said that the "first single off my last album, 'AM to PM', was more of a kiddie kind of thing, very pop. [Dip It Low] is more R&B, kind of a club/party kind of vibe." An issue Milian had with the album was that it did not flow. The various pop and urban influences in that album, she found, confused the audience. For her next studio album, Milian said that she wanted a more consistent feel.

== Other ventures ==
In 2010, Milian signed Australian singers, Kasey Osborne and Kelsey-Maree, as their manager. Milian said, "the girls have everything it takes to be the biggest international duo out there. The world is definitely ready for these beautiful girls to hit the stage and kill it on screen." She said that the duo were the "most exciting project" she had worked on.

== Discography ==
Studio albums

- Christina Milian (2002)
- It's About Time (2004)
- So Amazin' (2006)

== Filmography ==
=== Film ===
Year	Film	Role	Notes
1998	A Bug's Life	Female Ants (voice)	
1999	American Pie	Band Member	
1999	The Wood	Girl at Dance	
1999	Durango Kids	Eleanor "Ellie" Bigelow	
2003	Love Don't Cost a Thing	Paris Morgan	
2004	Torque	Nina	
2005	Man of the House	Anne	
2005	Be Cool	Linda Moon	
2006	Pulse	Isabelle Fuentes	
2007	Snowglobe	Angela Moreno	Television film
2009	Ghosts of Girlfriends Past	Kalia	Uncredited
2009	Bring It On: Fight to the Finish	Catalina "Lina" Cruz	Direct-to-video
2010	Christmas Cupid	Sloane	Television film
2013	Baggage Claim	Taylor	
2013	A Snow Globe Christmas	Sal	Television film
2016	The Rocky Horror Picture Show	Magenta	Television film
2018	Memories of Christmas	Noelle	Television film
2019	Falling Inn Love	Gabriela	
2021	Resort to Love	Erica Wilson	
2024	Body Language	Mariana	
2024	Meet Me Next Christmas	Layla	

=== Television ===
Year	Title	Role	Notes
1996	Sister, Sister	Girl #3	Episode: "When a Man Loves Two Women"
1996	Sister, Sister	Lana	Episode: "Kid-Napped"
1996	Aaahh!!! Real Monsters	Girl/Little Red Riding Hood (voice)	Episode: "The Master Monster/Slumber Scare"
1997	Smart Guy	Kiki	Episode: "Don't Do That Thing You Do"
1998	The Wild Thornberrys	Sipho (voice)	Episode: "Naimina Enkiyio"
1998–99	Movie Surfers	Tina Flores	Main Cast
1999	The Steve Harvey Show	Young Lady in Hallway	Episode: "Working Homegirl"
1999	Smart Guy	Pretty Girl	Episode: "Can't Buy Me Love"
1999	Charmed	Teri Lane	Episode: "The Wendigo"
1999	The Wild Thornberrys	Macqaque Wallah (voice)	Episode: "Rumble in the Jungle"
1999	Clueless	Megan	Recurring Cast: Season 3
1999	Get Real	Tennisha	Recurring Cast
1999	The Amanda Show	Guest on "The Girls Room" sketch	Season 1 Episode 3
2000	Cousin Skeeter	Sweetie	Episode: "The Feminine Ms. Skeet"
2001–04	Top of the Pops	Herself	Recurring Cast
2002	Becoming Presents: Wannabe	Herself/Host	Main Host
2002	All That	Herself	Episode: "Barry Watson/Christina Milian"
2004	Mad TV	Herself	Episode: "Flavor Flav/Christina Milian/Joe Budden"
2004	MTV Cribs	Herself	Episode: "November 21, 2004"
2005	Diary	Herself	Episode: "Christina Milian"
2005	Reel Comedy	Herself	Episode: "Be Cool"
2005	Wild 'N Out	Herself/Team Captain	Episode: "Christina Milian/Common"
2006	Making the Video	Herself	Episode: "A Public Affair"
2007	Smallville	Rachel Davenport	Episode: "Action"
2010	Running Russell Simmons	Herself	Episode: "You Only Live Once"
2010	Meet The Browns	Claudia	Episode: "Meet the Sugar Mama"
2010–20	Family Guy	Esther (voice)	Guest: Season 9 & 11-14 & 17 & 19, Recurring Cast: Season 15
2011	CSI: Crime Scene Investigation	Sydney Preston	Episode: "All That Cremains"
2012	A Gifted Man	Shawnee Baker	Episode: "In Case of Co-Dependants"
2012–13	The Voice	Herself/Correspondent	Main Social Media Correspondent: Season 2–4
2013	Dancing with the Stars	Herself/Contestant	Contestant: Season 17
2014	The Real Housewives of Beverly Hills	Herself	Episode: "Catfight on the Catwalk"
2014	Joan & Melissa: Joan Knows Best?	Herself	Episode: "Get the F... Out!"
2015	Steve Harvey	Herself/Panelist	Episode: "Episode #4.40"
2015	FABLife	Herself/Guest Co-Host	Episode: "Episode #1.58"
2015	Dora and Friends: Into the City!	La Sirena Mala (voice)	Episode: "Magical Mermaid Adventure"
2015	East Los High	Liliana	Recurring Cast: Season 3
2015–16	Christina Milian Turned Up	Herself	Main Cast
2015–16	Grandfathered	Vanessa	Main Cast
2016	Lip Sync Battle	Herself/Competitor	Episode: "Josh Peck vs. Christina Milian"
2016	The Talk	Herself/Guest Co-Host	Episode: "Episode #6.198"
2017	Big Star Little Star	Herself/Contestant	Episode: "Episode #1.5"
2017	Celebrity Family Feud	Herself/Contestant	Episode: "Episode #4.6"
2017	Superhuman	Herself/Panelist	Main Panelist
2017	Beat Shazam	Herself	Episode: "Episode #1.11"
2017	90's House	Herself/Host	Main Host
2017	Ridiculousness	Herself	Episode: "Christina Milian"
2017–18	Hip Hop Squares	Herself/Panelist	Guest Panelist: Season 3–5
2018	The Real	Herself/Guest Co-Host	Episode: "Christina Milian/Jenifer Lewis/Hit Reply"
2019	Drop the Mic	Herself	Episode: "Episode #3.5"
2019	Botched	Herself	Episode: "Viva Las Vegas Boobs"
2019	Song Association	Herself	Episode: "Christina Milian"
2019	The Oath	Officer Christine Parks	Main Cast: Season 2
2019	Claws	Fake Virginia	Episode: "What Is Happening to America"
2019	Soundtrack	De'Andra Green	Recurring Cast
2021	Step Up: High Water	Collette Jones	Main Cast: Season 3
2024–25	Dexter: Original Sin	Maria LaGuerta	Main Cast

=== Music videos ===
Year	Song	Artist
2000	"The Best of Me"	Mýa featuring Jadakiss
2006	"A Public Affair"	Jessica Simpson
2008	"Elevator"	Flo Rida featuring Timbaland
2013	"Tapout"	Rich Gang featuring Future
2013	"Let There Be Love"	Christina Aguilera
2014	"My Baby"	Zendaya

=== Video games ===
Year	Title	Role
2002	Kim Possible: Revenge of Monkey Fist	-
2003	Def Jam Vendetta	Angeline "Angel" Rodriguez (voice)
2008	Need for Speed: Undercover	Carmen Mendez (voice)

== Awards and nominations ==
Year	Award	Result
2004	Teen Choice Award for Choice Breakout Movie Star – Female	Nominated
2004	Teen Choice Award for Choice Movie Chemistry (shared with Nick Cannon)	Nominated
2004	Teen Choice Award for Choice Movie Liplock (shared with Nick Cannon)	Nominated
2005	Teen Choice Award for Choice Hottie: Female	Nominated
2005	Teen Choice Award for Choice Crossover Artist (Music to Movies)	Nominated
2005	BET Comedy Award for Outstanding Supporting Actress in a Theatrical Film for Be Cool	Nominated
2005	Grammy Award for Best Contemporary R&B Album for It's About Time	Nominated
2005	Grammy Award for Best Rap/Sung Collaboration for "Dip It Low" (shared with Fabolous)	Nominated
2005	The Reign Award for Outstanding Achievement	Won
2005	Groovevolt Music and Fashion Award for Best Song Performance – Female for "Dip It Low"	Nominated
2005	International Dance Music Award for Best R&B/Urban Dance Track for "Dip It Low"	Nominated
2006	Ozone Award for Best R&B Female	Won
2008	Imagen Foundation Award for Best TV Actress for Snowglobe	Won
2014	Acapulco Black Film Festival Award for Best Ensemble Cast for Baggage Claim	Nominated

== See also ==
- List of Afro-Latinos
