= Bloodshy & Avant =

Swedish record production and songwriting duo

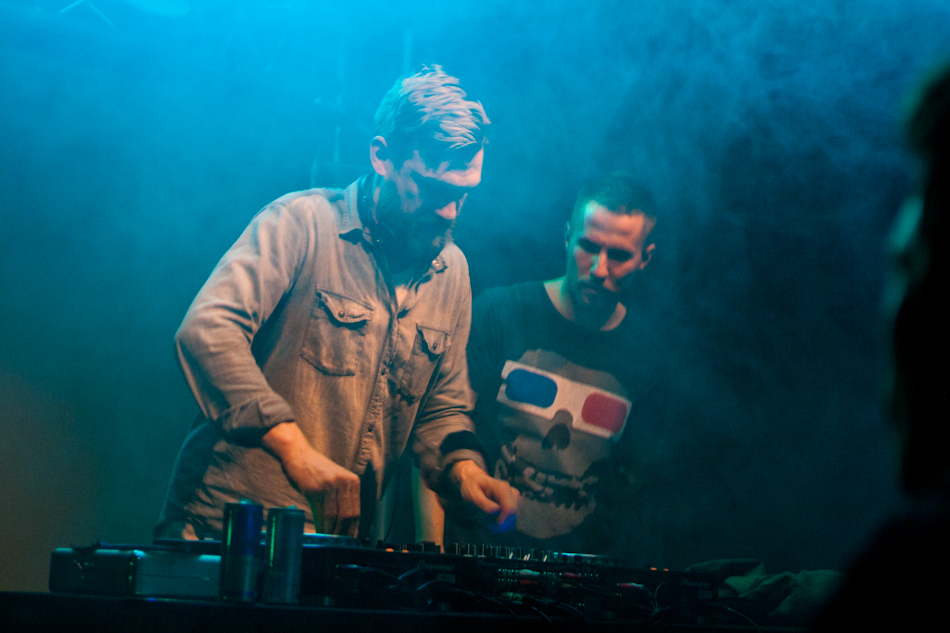
- Pontus Winnberg (left) and Christian Karlsson performing in Södertälje, 2011

Background information
- Origin: Gothenburg, Sweden
- Genres: Pop, dance-pop, electropop
- Spinoffs: Miike Snow
- Members: Christian Karlsson; Pontus Winnberg

Bloodshy & Avant are a Swedish record production and songwriting duo consisting of Christian Karlsson (Bloodshy) and Pontus Winnberg (Avant). They had their first major success with Christina Milian's "AM to PM" in 2001 and co-wrote and produced Britney Spears' "Toxic", which topped the UK Singles Chart in 2004 and won the Grammy Award for Best Dance Recording. They have also worked with Madonna, Kylie Minogue and Jennifer Lopez among others, and in 2007 they formed the band Miike Snow with Andrew Wyatt.

== Background ==
As a teenager Christian Karlsson played guitar and sang in punk bands. At 16 he joined the Gothenburg hip hop group Goldmine, which opened for the Fugees in Stockholm in 1996. When the group split up its singer Deetah went solo with Karlsson as her producer. Her album Deadly Cha Cha (1998) was released by London Records but did not bring a breakthrough. Karlsson also made three remixes of Jay-Z's "Hard Knock Life". He has used the name Bloodshy since he was about 14. It comes from Jasper Bloodshy, a character in a Disney western he saw as a child.

Pontus Winnberg grew up in Lerum, outside Gothenburg. He was raised on classical music, his father teaching music theory at the Academy of Music and Drama in Gothenburg, and in his youth he played in the band Solomon and ran house clubs in the city. He got to know Karlsson during the latter's time in Goldmine, but the two did not start working together until some years later.

== Breakthrough ==
As Karlsson's workload grew he got in touch with Winnberg. Their first joint work was a remix for Morcheeba, and the first song of their own to become a hit was Christina Milian's "AM to PM" (2001), which reached number three in the UK. They went on to work on Ms. Dynamite's album A Little Deeper (2002) and co-wrote and produced Rachel Stevens' "Sweet Dreams My L.A. Ex", which reached number two in the UK in 2003.

In these years the duo were part of the Stockholm production company Murlyn Music, where Karlsson, Anders Bagge and Arnthor Birgisson were among the leading producers. Winnberg moved to Stockholm around 2001, and the duo worked at first in a studio in Bergshamra. They later set up their own studio, Robotberget, on Södermalm.

== Work with Britney Spears ==
In 2003 the duo were among the producers of Britney Spears' album In the Zone. "Toxic", which they wrote with Cathy Dennis and Henrik Jonback, topped the UK Singles Chart and won them the Grammy Award for Best Dance Recording in 2005. The two were not at the ceremony but on holiday in Asia, and the award was accepted by the mix engineer Niklas Flyckt. The same year the song received the Ivor Novello Award for PRS Most Performed Work.

The collaboration continued on the compilation Greatest Hits: My Prerogative (2004), for which the duo produced Spears' version of Bobby Brown's "My Prerogative" and the two new songs "Do Somethin'" and "I've Just Begun (Having My Fun)". They also made "Chaotic", the theme song of the reality series Britney & Kevin: Chaotic. On Blackout (2007) they produced four songs, among them the single "Piece of Me", and on Circus (2008) they made "Unusual You".

== Other productions ==
The duo co-wrote "How High" and "Like It or Not" on Madonna's Confessions on a Dance Floor (2005) and made two tracks for Kylie Minogue's X (2007), among them "Nu-di-ty". They also produced songs for Jordin Sparks and Jennifer Lopez, and wrote "Buddha's Delight" for the film Music and Lyrics. In 2006 the music publisher Crosstown Songs bought Murlyn's song catalogue, which included the duo's songs, and in 2007 the duo received the Swedish Government's Music Export Prize.

In 2010 the duo produced Sky Ferreira's debut single "One", which they wrote with her and Marit Bergman. Ferreira and the duo had come into contact through Myspace before she had a record deal.

== Miike Snow and later years ==
In 2007 Karlsson and Winnberg formed the band Miike Snow with the American singer and songwriter Andrew Wyatt. Its debut album, Miike Snow (2009), was written and recorded at the duo's own studio, a converted fire station. Happy to You followed in 2012 and iii in 2016.

By 2012, according to Rolling Stone, the two were spending most of their time on the band. Winnberg is also a member of Amason, and Karlsson of the duo Galantis.

== Awards and nominations ==
Awards and nominations received by Bloodshy & Avant
Year	Award	Category	Work	Result	Ref.
2004	Swedish Music Publishers' Award	Biggest International Success of the Year	"Toxic" (with Henrik Jonback)	Won	
2005	Grammy Awards	Best Dance Recording	"Toxic"	Won	
2005	Ivor Novello Awards	PRS Most Performed Work	"Toxic"	Won	
2005	ASCAP Pop Music Awards	Most Performed Songs	"Toxic"	Won	
2007	Music Export Prize	—N/a	—N/a	Won	
2010	Grammis	Producer of the Year	Miike Snow	Nominated	

== Selected productions ==
Songs written or produced by the duo.

- 2001 – Christina Milian – "AM to PM"
- 2002 – Samantha Mumba – "I'm Right Here"
- 2002 – Ms. Dynamite – "Put Him Out"
- 2003 – Rachel Stevens – "Sweet Dreams My L.A. Ex"
- 2003 – Britney Spears – "Toxic"
- 2004 – Britney Spears – "My Prerogative", "Do Somethin'" and "I've Just Begun (Having My Fun)"
- 2005 – Britney Spears – "Chaotic"
- 2005 – Madonna – "How High" and "Like It or Not"
- 2005 – Rob Thomas – "This Is How a Heart Breaks"
- 2006 – Kelis featuring Spragga Benz – "Fire"
- 2007 – Britney Spears – "Piece of Me" and "Radar"
- 2007 – Jennifer Lopez – "Brave"
- 2007 – Jordin Sparks – "Shy Boy" and "Young and in Love"
- 2007 – Kylie Minogue – "Speakerphone" and "Nu-di-ty"
- 2007 – Haley Bennett – "Buddha's Delight"
- 2008 – Britney Spears – "Unusual You"
- 2010 – Sky Ferreira – "One"
