= The Game discography =

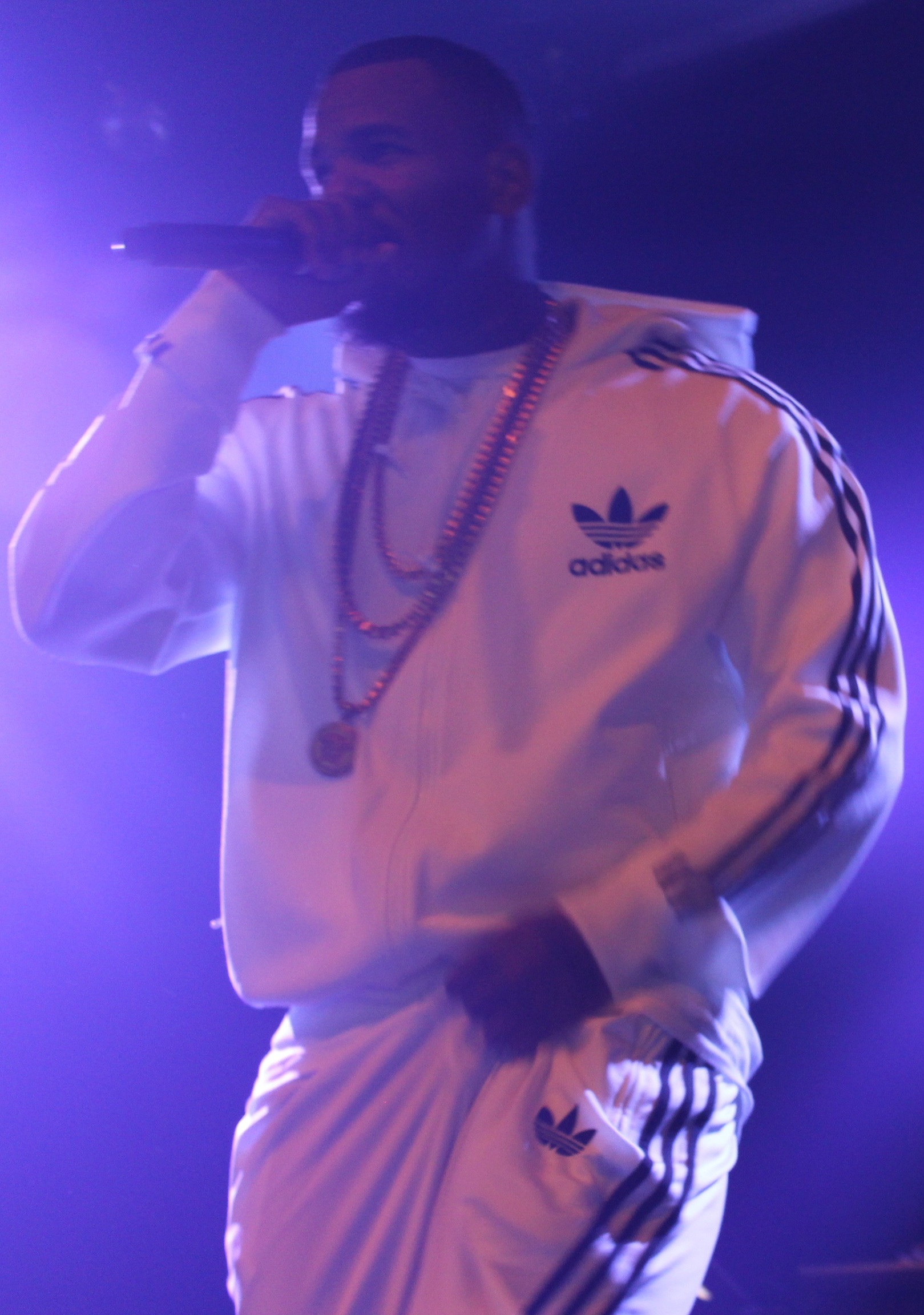
- The Game performing in December 2013
- Studio albums: 11
- Soundtrack albums: 2
- Compilation albums: 8
- Singles: 30
- Music videos: 39
- Mixtapes: 14

The discography of the Game, an American rapper, consists of eleven studio albums, six compilation albums, two soundtrack albums, fifteen mixtapes, 31 singles (including fifteen as a featured artist), and 39 music videos. His music was released on major record labels such as Interscope, Geffen, and DGC Records, along with subsidiaries Aftermath Entertainment and G-Unit Records, including independent record labels Get Low Recordz and Fast Life Music, Inc. Records of which has released some of his early material.

The Game's debut studio album, The Documentary (2005), produced five singles, including the two US Billboard Hot 100 top five singles "How We Do" and "Hate It or Love It" (with rapper 50 Cent), in which both singles reached gold sales status. The other three singles includes "Westside Story" (with rapper 50 Cent), "Dreams", and "Put You on the Game". The album reached number one in the United States, and shipped over 2 million copies and was a certified double platinum by the Recording Industry Association of America (RIAA). After the album's release, the Game was considered to be a driving force in reviving and bringing back the West Coast hip hop scene, which has been overshadowed by artists from the East and South. The Game was nominated for two 2006 Grammy Awards: Grammy Award for Best Rap Song and Grammy Award for Best Rap Performance by a Duo or Group for the hit single, "Hate It or Love It".

After the Game had a falling out from Aftermath Entertainment and G-Unit Records, he retained his deal with Interscope Records while merely swapping roofs with subsidiary, Geffen Records. The Game's second studio album, Doctor's Advocate (2006), debuted at number one on the US Billboard 200 chart, making it his second number one album in a row, also making it another commercial success with shipping just under 358,000 sales in its first week. Doctor's Advocate produced three singles such as "It's Okay (One Blood)" (with reggae singer Junior Reid), "Let's Ride", and "Wouldn't Get Far" (with rapper Kanye West). The album was set out by the Game to prove that he was still able to make good music and be a successful artist as he did on The Documentary without the help of Dr. Dre or 50 Cent.

The Game's third studio album, LAX (2008), went head to head with heavy metal and nu metal band Slipknot's All Hope Is Gone on the US Billboard 200, as both of these albums were released on August 26, 2008. LAX debuted at number two on the US Billboard 200, at first, it looked like that LAX would debuted ahead of All Hope Is Gone by selling 13 copies, with such a close difference. Initially, Billboard published an article stating that The Game secured the top spot with a margin of 13 units, in what was described as the "closest race for number one since Nielsen SoundScan began tracking Data in 1991". Slipknot's labels Warner Music Group and Roadrunner Records asked for a soundscan recount, a historic first. Nielsen proceeded to the recount, placing LAX at number two, with 238,382 copies, and Slipknot in first position with 239,516 copies scanned, a margin of 1,134 copies. After the recount 12 hours later, the article was rewritten and Slipknot was awarded the number one spot, having sold 239,516 units. LAX also produced four singles such as "Game's Pain" (with R&B singer Keyshia Cole), "Dope Boys" (with Blink-182 drummer Travis Barker), "My Life" (with rapper Lil Wayne), and "Camera Phone" (with R&B singer Ne-Yo).

== Albums ==
=== Studio albums ===
List of studio albums, with selected chart positions, sales figures and certifications
Title	Album details	Peak chart positions										Sales	Certifications
Title	Album details	US	US R&B/HH	US Rap	AUS	CAN	GER	IRL	NZ	SWI	UK	Sales	Certifications
The Documentary	Released: January 18, 2005; Label: G-Unit, Aftermath, Interscope; Formats: CD, LP, cassette, digital download	1	1	1	42	1	11	3	11	8	7	US: 2,500,000	RIAA: 2× Platinum; ARIA: Gold; BPI: Platinum; IRMA: Platinum; MC: Platinum; RMNZ: Platinum
Doctor's Advocate	Released: November 14, 2006; Label: Geffen; Formats: CD, LP, cassette, digital download	1	1	1	28	2	29	8	24	15	21	US: 969,000	BPI: Gold; RMNZ: Gold
LAX	Released: August 26, 2008; Label: Geffen; Formats: CD, LP, cassette, digital download	2	1	1	12	2	33	8	18	8	9	US: 765,000	BPI: Silver
The R.E.D. Album	Released: August 23, 2011; Label: DGC, Interscope; Formats: CD, digital download	1	1	1	12	2	22	7	27	7	14	US: 390,000	
Jesus Piece	Released: December 11, 2012; Label: DGC, Interscope; Formats: CD, digital download	6	1	1	—	16	—	—	—	—	76	US: 362,000	
The Documentary 2	Released: October 9, 2015; Label: Blood Money, eOne; Formats: CD, LP, digital download	2	1	1	— (Note: Although The Documentary 2 and 2.5 were both released in Australia and sold enough to debut within the top ten, The Game's label did not register its sales with ARIA in order for either album to be eligible to chart.)	3	22	10	5	9	4	US: 116,000	
The Documentary 2.5	Released: October 16, 2015; Label: Blood Money, eOne; Formats: CD, LP, digital download	6	2	2	—	8	45	32	24	20	23	US: 53,000	
1992	Released: October 14, 2016; Label: Blood Money, eOne; Formats: CD, LP, digital download	4	1	1	19	14	91	33	— (Note: 1992 did not enter the NZ Top 40 Albums Chart, but peaked at number two on the NZ Heatseekers Albums Chart.)	45	38		
Born 2 Rap	Released: November 29, 2019; Label: Prolific, eOne; Formats: CD, LP, digital download	19	10	7	53	18	—	—	40	66	—		
Drillmatic – Heart vs. Mind	Released: August 12, 2022; Label: 100, Virgin; Formats: digital download	12	8	5	72	12	—	—	40	58	61		
The Documentary III	Released: August 21, 2026; Label: Numinati/FTS Global Management; Formats: digital download	68	18	10	—	—	—	—	—	—	— (Note: The Documentary III did not enter the UK Albums Chart, but peaked at 27 on the UK Album Downloads Chart.)		
"—" denotes a recording that did not chart or was not released in that territory.

=== Compilation albums ===
List of compilation albums, with selected chart positions, sales figures and certifications
Title	Album details	Peak chart positions										Sales
Title	Album details	US	US R&B/HH	US Rap	AUS	CAN	GER	IRL	NZ	SWI	UK	Sales
Untold Story	Released: October 5, 2004; Label: Get Low, Fast Life; Formats: CD, digital download	146	29	—	—	—	—	—	—	—	—	
West Coast Resurrection	Released: March 29, 2005; Label: Get Low, Fast Life; Formats: CD, digital download	53	24	—	—	—	—	—	—	—	—	
Untold Story, Vol. 2	Released: July 26, 2005; Label: Get Low, Fast Life; Formats: CD, digital download	61	29	17	—	—	—	—	—	—	—	
G.A.M.E.	Released: March 21, 2006; Label: Get Low, Fast Life; Formats: CD, digital download	151	31	16	—	—	—	—	—	—	—	
Blood Moon: Year of the Wolf (with Blood Money)	Released: October 14, 2014; Label: Blood Money, eOne; Formats: CD, digital download	7	1	1	27	8	47	—	—	36	60	US: 80,000; CAN: 3,600
The Documentary 2 / 2.5 (Collector's Edition)	Released: January 22, 2016; Label: Blood Money, eOne; Formats: CD, digital download	134	33	23	—	—	—	—	—	—	—	
Unreleased Lost Files	Released: October 30, 2026; Label: The Last Stand Entertainment, Hitmaker Distro; Formats: Streaming, digital download	—	—	—	—	—	—	—	—	—	—	
"—" denotes a recording that did not chart or was not released in that territory.

=== Soundtrack albums ===
List of soundtrack albums, with selected chart positions, sales figures and certifications
Title	Album details	Peak chart positions					
Title	Album details	US	US R&B/HH	US Rap	AUS	SWI	UK
Streets of Compton	Released: June 17, 2016; Label: eOne; Formats: CD, digital download	25	4	4	72	63	176
Block Wars	Released: July 29, 2016; Label: eOne; Formats: CD, Digital download	—	22	16	—	—	—

=== Collaborative albums ===
List of collaborative albums, with selected information
Title	Album details
Paisley Dreams (with Big Hit & Hit-Boy)	Released: January 1, 2024; Label: Surf Club Inc., STB Entertainment; Formats: CDr, digital download

== Mixtapes ==
List of mixtapes, with selected information
Title	Mixtape details
You Know What It Is, Vol. 1	Released: November 16, 2002; Label: Get Low, Fast Life; Formats: CD, digital download
Live from Compton	Released: 2003; Label: Get Low, Fast Life; Formats: CD, digital download
Westside Story	Released: September 23, 2004; Label: G-Unit, Aftermath; Formats: CD, digital download
You Know What It Is, Vol. 2: Throwin' Rocks At the Throne	Released: December 18, 2004; Label: G-Unit, Aftermath, Boost Mobile; Formats: CD, Digital download
You Know What It Is, Vol. 3	Released: June 19, 2005; Label: The Black Wall Street; Formats: CD, Digital download
Ghost Unit	Released: September 7, 2005; Label: The Black Wall Street; Formats: CD, Digital download
Stop Snitchin, Stop Lyin	Released: December 3, 2005; Label: The Black Wall Street; Formats: CD, digital download
You Know What It Is, Vol. 4: Murda Game Chronicles	Released: April 8, 2007; Label: The Black Wall Street; Formats: CD, Digital download
The Red Room	Released: April 26, 2010; Label: The Black Wall Street; Formats: Digital download
Brake Lights	Released: August 3, 2010; Label: The Black Wall Street; Formats: Digital download
Purp & Patron	Released: January 24, 2011; Label: The Black Wall Street; Formats: Digital download
Purp & Patron: The Hangover	Released: January 31, 2011; Label: The Black Wall Street; Formats: Digital download
Hoodmorning (No Typo): Candy Coronas	Released: July 29, 2011; Label: The Black Wall Street; Formats: Digital download
California Republic	Released: April 5, 2012; Label: The Black Wall Street; Formats: Digital download
OKE: Operation Kill Everything	Released: October 8, 2013; Label: Crow It Up; Formats: Digital download; Peaked at number 89 on the Billboard 200.
Time (with Various Artists)	Released: June 7, 2024; Label: STB Entertainment; Formats: Digital download
Gangsta Grillz: Every Movie Needs a Trailer (with DJ Drama & Mike & Keys)	Released: December 5, 2025; Label: Numinati, FTS; Formats: Digital download
Gangsta Grillz: E.M.N.T – The Credits (with DJ Drama & Mike & Keys)	Released: January 30, 2026; Label: Numinati, FTS; Formats: Digital download

== Singles ==
=== As lead artist ===
List of singles as lead artist, with selected chart positions and certifications, showing year released and album name
Title	Year	Peak chart positions										Certifications	Album
Title	Year	US	US R&B/HH	US Rap	AUS	CAN	GER	IRL	NZ	SWI	UK	Certifications	Album
"Westside Story" (featuring 50 Cent)	2004	93	55	—	—	—	—	—	—	—	—	RMNZ: Gold	The Documentary
"How We Do" (featuring 50 Cent)	2004	4	2	2	24	—	9	8	4	8	5	RIAA: Gold; BPI: Platinum; BVMI: Platinum; RMNZ: 3× Platinum	The Documentary
"Hate It or Love It" (featuring 50 Cent)	2005	2	1	1	21	—	14	5	3	12	4	RIAA: Gold; ARIA: 3× Platinum; BPI: 3× Platinum; BVMI: Platinum; RMNZ: 6× Platinum	The Documentary
"Higher"	2005	—	— (Note: "Higher" did not enter the Hot R&B/Hip-Hop Songs chart, but peaked at number 8 on the Bubbling Under R&B/Hip-Hop Singles chart, which acts as a 25-song extension to the Hot R&B/Hip-Hop Songs chart.)	—	—	—	—	—	—	—	—		The Documentary
"Dreams"	2005	32	12	5	42	—	71	11	35	40	8	BPI: Silver; RMNZ: Gold	The Documentary
"Put You on the Game"	2005	—	96	—	—	—	—	22	—	—	46		The Documentary
"It's Okay (One Blood)" (featuring Junior Reid)	2006	71	33	16	68	—	41	16	25	—	26		Doctor's Advocate
"Let's Ride"	2006	46	55	14	75	—	74	36	17	79	42	RMNZ: Gold	Doctor's Advocate
"Wouldn't Get Far" (featuring Kanye West)	2007	64	26	11	—	—	—	—	—	—	—	RMNZ: Gold	Doctor's Advocate
"Game's Pain" (featuring Keyshia Cole)	2008	75	20	9	—	94	—	—	—	—	—		LAX
"Dope Boys" (featuring Travis Barker)	2008	—	— (Note: "Dope Boys" did not enter the Hot R&B/Hip-Hop Songs chart, but peaked at number 11 on the Bubbling Under R&B/Hip-Hop Singles chart, which acts as a 25-song extension to the Hot R&B/Hip-Hop Songs chart.)	—	—	—	—	—	—	—	—		LAX
"My Life" (featuring Lil Wayne)	2008	21	15	4	—	42	—	36	—	49	34		LAX
"Camera Phone" (featuring Ne-Yo)	2009	—	—	—	—	—	—	—	—	—	48		LAX
"Red Nation" (featuring Lil Wayne)	2011	62	— (Note: "Red Nation" did not enter the Hot R&B/Hip-Hop Songs chart, but peaked at number 22 on the Bubbling Under R&B/Hip-Hop Singles chart, which acts as a 25-song extension to the Hot R&B/Hip-Hop Songs chart.)	—	—	—	—	—	—	—	—		The R.E.D. Album
"Pot of Gold" (featuring Chris Brown)	2011	— (Note: "Pot of Gold" did not enter the Billboard Hot 100, but peaked at number 1 on the Bubbling Under Hot 100 Singles chart, which acts as a 25-song extension to the Hot 100.)	53	—	—	—	—	—	—	72	58		The R.E.D. Album
"Celebration" (featuring Chris Brown, Tyga, Wiz Khalifa, and Lil Wayne)	2012	81	24	19	—	—	—	—	—	—	—	RMNZ: Gold	Jesus Piece
"All That (Lady)" (featuring Lil Wayne, Big Sean, Fabolous, and Jeremih)	2013	—	48	—	—	—	—	—	—	—	—		Jesus Piece
"T.H.O.T." (featuring Problem, Huddy, and Bad Lucc)	2014	—	—	—	—	—	—	—	—	—	—		Non-album single
"Bigger Than Me"	2014	—	—	—	— (Note: "Bigger Than Me" did not enter the ARIA Australian Singles Chart, but peaked at number 35 on the Australian Top 40 Urban Singles chart.)	—	—	—	—	—	—		Blood Moon: Year of the Wolf
"Or Nah" (featuring Too Short, Problem, AV, and Eric Bellinger)	2014	—	— (Note: "Or Nah" did not enter the Hot R&B/Hip-Hop Songs chart, but peaked at number seven on the Bubbling Under R&B/Hip-Hop Singles chart, which acts as a 25-song extension to the Hot R&B/Hip-Hop Songs chart.)	—	—	—	—	—	—	—	—		Blood Moon: Year of the Wolf
"The Soundtrack" (featuring Meek Mill)	2014	—	—	—	—	—	—	—	—	—	—		The Documentary 2 / 2.5 (Collector's Edition)
"Ryda" (featuring Dej Loaf)	2015	—	— (Note: "Ryda" did not enter the Hot R&B/Hip-Hop Songs chart, but peaked at number two on the Bubbling Under R&B/Hip-Hop Singles chart, which acts as a 25-song extension to the Hot R&B/Hip-Hop Songs chart.)	—	—	—	—	—	—	—	—		Non-album single
"100" (featuring Drake)	2015	82	25	22	—	63	—	—	—	—	179	RIAA: Platinum; RMNZ: Gold	The Documentary 2
"El Chapo" (with Skrillex)	2015	—	— (Note: "El Chapo" did not enter the Hot R&B/Hip-Hop Songs chart, but peaked at number seven on the Bubbling Under R&B/Hip-Hop Singles chart, which acts as a 25-song extension to the Hot R&B/Hip-Hop Songs chart.)	—	—	—	—	—	—	—	—	RIAA: Gold; RMNZ: Platinum	The Documentary 2.5
"Roped Off" (featuring Problem and Boogie)	2016	—	—	—	—	—	—	—	—	—	—		Streets of Compton
"All Eyez" (featuring Jeremih)	2016	79	30	21	—	—	—	—	—	—	—	RIAA: Gold; RMNZ: Platinum	1992
"Oh I" (featuring Jeremih, Young Thug, and Sevyn Streeter)	2017	—	—	—	—	—	—	—	—	—	—		Non-album singles
"DTF" (featuring YG, Ty Dolla Sign, and Jeremih)	2018	—	—	—	—	—	33	—	—	—	—		Non-album singles
"West Side"	2019	—	—	—	—	—	—	—	— (Note: "West Side" did not enter the NZ Top 40 Singles Chart, but peaked at number 31 on the NZ Hot Singles Chart.)	—	—		Born 2 Rap
"Stainless" (featuring Anderson .Paak)	2019	—	—	—	—	—	—	—	— (Note: "Stainless" did not enter the NZ Top 40 Singles Chart, but peaked at number 28 on the NZ Hot Singles Chart.)	—	—		Born 2 Rap
"A.I. with the Braids" (featuring Lil Wayne)	2020	—	—	—	—	—	—	—	—	—	—		Non-album single
"Eazy" (with Kanye West)	2022	49	13	9	—	35	—	—	35	63	32		Drillmatic – Heart vs. Mind
"87 Cutlass" (with Ray Vaughn)	2024	—	—	—	—	—	—	—	—	—	—		Bosco (Original Motion Picture Soundtrack) - Side B
"Tina" (with Kanye West featuring Jim Jones)	2025	—	—	—	—	—	—	—	—	—	—		Non-album singles
"Red People" (with YG, Swizz Beatz, and Timbaland)	2026	—	—	—	—	—	—	—	—	—	—		Non-album singles
"No Brakes" (with Drake)	2026	—	38	—	—	—	—	—	— (Note: "No Brakes" did not enter the NZ Top 40 Singles Chart, but peaked at number 15 on the NZ Hot Singles Chart.)	—	—		The Documentary III
"—" denotes a recording that did not chart or was not released in that territory.

=== As featured artist ===
List of singles as featured artist, with selected chart positions, showing year released and album name
Title	Year	Peak chart positions								Certifications	Album
Title	Year	US	US R&B/HH	US Rap	GER	IRL	NZ	SWI	UK	Certifications	Album
"Playa's Only" (R. Kelly featuring the Game)	2005	65	36	—	35	31	22	28	33		TP.3 Reloaded
"Make the World Go Round" (Nas featuring Chris Brown and the Game)	2008	—	— (Note: "Make the World Go Round" did not enter the Hot R&B/Hip-Hop Songs chart, but peaked at number 22 on the Bubbling Under R&B/Hip-Hop Singles chart, which acts as a 25-song extension to the Hot R&B/Hip-Hop Songs chart.)	—	—	—	—	—	—		Untitled
"The Future" (Joe Budden featuring the Game and Dominic)	2008	—	—	—	—	—	—	—	—		Padded Room
"Trunk Music" (Strong Arm Steady featuring the Game)	2011	—	—	—	—	—	—	—	—		Arms & Hammers
"Caillra for Life" (La Fouine featuring the Game)	2011	—	—	—	—	—	—	—	—		La Fouine vs Laouni
"Can a Drummer Get Some?" (Travis Barker featuring Lil Wayne, Rick Ross, Swizz Beatz, and the Game)	2011	—	—	—	—	—	—	—	—		Give the Drummer Some
"I'm Not a Gangsta" (Lights Over Paris featuring the Game)	2011	—	—	—	—	—	—	—	—		Non-album single
"Lehhhgooo" (N.O.R.E. featuring Busta Rhymes, the Game, and Waka Flocka Flame)	2012	—	—	—	—	—	—	—	—		Crack on Steroids
"Party We Will Throw Now!" (Warren G featuring The Game and Nate Dogg)	2012	—	—	—	—	—	—	—	—	RMNZ: Platinum	Non-album single
"Do It All" (Joe Young featuring Rick Ross, Cashis, the Game, and K. Young)	2012	—	—	—	—	—	—	—	—		Non-album single
"Lost Angels" (R-Mean featuring the Game and Marka)	2012	—	—	—	—	—	—	—	—		7 Deady Sins
"Double Cup" (DJ Infamous featuring Jeezy, Ludacris, Juicy J, the Game, and Hitmaka)	2013	—	— (Note: "Double Cup" did not enter the Hot R&B/Hip-Hop Songs chart, but peaked at number three on the Bubbling Under R&B/Hip-Hop Singles chart, which acts as a 25-song extension to the Hot R&B/Hip-Hop Songs chart.)	—	—	—	—	—	—		Non-album single
"Awkward" (Eric Bellinger featuring the Game)	2014	—	—	—	—	—	—	—	—		Choose Up Season
"Power of the Dollar" (Franc Grams featuring the Game and Jus Cuz)	2014	—	—	—	—	—	—	—	—		Non-album singles
"#Wheresthelove" (The Black Eyed Peas featuring Diddy, Justin Timberlake, Usher, Jamie Foxx, the Game, Mary J. Blige, Jessie J, Jessica Szohr, Nicole Scherzinger, DJ Khaled, Andra Day, Tori Kelly, Ty Dolla Sign, Jaden Smith, and ASAP Rocky)	2016	—	—	—	39	—	—	41	47		Non-album singles
"See You Fail" (J Stone featuring the Game)	2019	—	—	—	—	—	—	—	—		The Definition of Loyalty
"Ek Din" (Bohemia featuring the Game, Karan Aujla, and J. Hind)	2020	—	—	—	—	—	—	—	—		Non-album single
"Underworld Degen" (G. Twilight featuring the Game)	2023	—	—	—	—	—	—	—	—		Underworld Degen (NFT Album)
"—" denotes a recording that did not chart or was not released in that territory.

== Other charted songs or certified songs ==
List of songs, with selected chart positions, showing year released and album name
Title	Year	Peak chart positions			Certifications	Album
Title	Year	US	US R&B/HH	NZ Hot	Certifications	Album
"1970 Somethin'" (The Notorious B.I.G. featuring Faith Evans and The Game)	2005	—	—	—	RMNZ: Platinum	Duets: The Final Chapter
"Breathe and Stop" (Fat Joe featuring the Game)	2006	—	— (Note: "Breathe and Stop" did not enter the Hot R&B/Hip-Hop Songs chart, but peaked at number 9 on the Bubbling Under R&B/Hip-Hop Singles chart, which acts as a 25-song extension to the Hot R&B/Hip-Hop Songs chart.)	—		Me, Myself & I
"Touchdown" (featuring Raheem DeVaughn)	2008	—	57	—		LAX
"Better on the Other Side" (with Chris Brown, Diddy, DJ Khalil, Polow da Don, Mario Winans, Usher, and Boyz II Men)	2009	—	— (Note: "Better on the Other Side" did not enter the Hot R&B/Hip-Hop Songs chart, but peaked at number 13 on the Bubbling Under R&B/Hip-Hop Singles chart, which acts as a 25-song extension to the Hot R&B/Hip-Hop Songs chart.)	—		Non-album single
"Martians vs. Goblins" (featuring Lil Wayne and Tyler, the Creator)	2011	100	—	—		The R.E.D. Album
"Ali Bomaye" (featuring 2 Chainz and Rick Ross)	2012	—	— (Note: "Ali Bomaye" did not enter the Hot R&B/Hip-Hop Songs chart, but peaked at number one on the Bubbling Under R&B/Hip-Hop Singles chart, which acts as an extension to the R&B/Hip-Hop Songs chart.)	—	BPI: Silver; RMNZ: Gold	Jesus Piece
"Switch Lanes" (Tyga featuring the Game)	2013	—	— (Note: "Switch Lanes" did not enter the Hot R&B/Hip-Hop Songs chart, but peaked at number seven on the Bubbling Under R&B/Hip-Hop Singles chart, which acts as a 25-song extension to the Hot R&B/Hip-Hop Songs chart.)	—	RIAA: Gold; RMNZ: Gold	Hotel California
"Don't Shoot" (featuring Rick Ross, 2 Chainz, Diddy, Fabolous, Wale, DJ Khaled, Swizz Beatz, Yo Gotti, Currensy, Problem, King Pharaoh, and TGT)	2014	—	— (Note: "Don't Shoot" did not enter the Hot R&B/Hip-Hop Songs chart, but peaked at number three on the Bubbling Under R&B/Hip-Hop Singles chart, which acts as a 25-song extension to the Hot R&B/Hip-Hop Songs chart.)	—		Non-album single
"Don't Trip" (featuring Ice Cube, Dr. Dre, and Will.i.am)	2015	—	— (Note: "Don't Trip" did not enter the Hot R&B/Hip-Hop Songs chart, but peaked at number seven on the Bubbling Under R&B/Hip-Hop Singles chart, which acts as a 25-song extension to the Hot R&B/Hip-Hop Songs chart.)	—		The Documentary 2
"On Me" (featuring Kendrick Lamar)	2015	—	— (Note: "On Me" did not enter the Hot R&B/Hip-Hop Songs chart, but peaked at number six on the Bubbling Under R&B/Hip-Hop Singles chart, which acts as a 25-song extension to the Hot R&B/Hip-Hop Songs chart.)	—		The Documentary 2
"City of Sin" (featuring Ed Sheeran)	2019	—	—	38		Born 2 Rap
"Welcome Home" (featuring Nipsey Hussle)	2019	—	—	33		Born 2 Rap
"The Code" (featuring 21 Savage)	2019	—	—	17		Born 2 Rap
"One Time" (featuring Ice-T)	2022	—	—	29		Drillmatic – Heart vs. Mind
"Burnin' Checks" (featuring Fivio Foreign)	2022	—	—	24		Drillmatic – Heart vs. Mind
"The Black Slim Shady"	2022	—	—	5		Drillmatic – Heart vs. Mind
"Love It or Hate It" (with Snoop Dogg, Sela V, and Cool & Dre)	2026	—	—	18		The Documentary III
"Steppers" (featuring Lil Wayne)	2026	—	—	38		The Documentary III
"—" denotes a recording that did not chart.

== Guest Appearances ==
List of non-single guest appearances, with other performing artists, showing year released and album name
Title	Year	Other performer(s)	Album
"Timez Up"	2002	Young Noble	Noble Justice
"Neighborhood Supastarz"	2002	JT the Bigga Figga	Hustle Relentless
"Dreams"	2002	Tela, Bun B	Double Dose
"We Are"	2003	Sean T, Blue Chip	Terrain Boss
"When the Chips Are Down"	2004	Lloyd Banks	The Hunger for More
"Hand on the Pump"	2004	DJ Kay Slay, Sauce Money, Memphis Bleek	The Streetsweeper, Vol. 2
"Died Too Soon"	2004	Busta Rhymes, DJ Quik	Surrender
"Makin' It"	2004	Rah Digga	Surrender
"Dead Bodies"	2004	The Alchemist, Prodigy	1st Infantry
"Stomp"	2004	Young Buck, Ludacris	Straight Outta Cashville
"Don't Play"	2004	MC Eiht	Smoke in tha City
"Southside"	2005	Lil Scrappy	Coach Carter (soundtrack)
"Hate It or Love It" (G-Unit Remix)	2005	50 Cent, Tony Yayo, Young Buck, Lloyd Banks	The Massacre
"Down"	2005	The Prom Kings	The Prom Kings
"When Shit Get Thick"	2005	JT the Bigga Figga, Sean T	Neighborhood Supastarz
"Neighborhood Supastarz"	2005	JT the Bigga Figga	Neighborhood Supastarz
"No Mercy" (Remix)	2005	Cuban Link	none
"Crack Music"	2005	Kanye West	Late Registration
"Get Up"	2005	DJ Quik, AMG	Trauma
"Quiet"	2005	Lil' Kim	The Naked Truth
"I'm Heat"	2005	Sharissa	Every Beat of My Heart
"Ridin'" (West Coast Remix)	2005	Chamillionaire, DJ Quik	none
"With You"	2005	Jamie Foxx, Snoop Dogg	Unpredictable
"Never Snitch"	2006	Scarface, Beanie Sigel	My Homies Part 2
"Tell Me When to Go" (Remix)	2006	E-40, Kanye West, Ice Cube	"Tell Me When to Go" single
"Push It" (Remix)	2006	Rick Ross, Bun B, Jadakiss, Styles P	none
"Get Racks"	2006	Celly Cel, Sean T	The Wild West
"1-800-Homicide"	2006	Hi-Tek, Dion	Hi-Teknology²: The Chip
"On Bail"	2006	Xzibit, Daz Dillinger, T-Pain	Full Circle
"Gangbangn' 101"	2006	Snoop Dogg	Tha Blue Carpet Treatment
"Ghetto Dayz"	2006	Tyrese, Kurupt	Alter Ego
"A Week Ago (Part 1)"	2006	DJ Clue, Mario Winans	The Professional 3
"A Week Ago (Part 2)"	2006	DJ Clue, Mario Winans	The Professional 3
"Hustlers"	2006	Nas, Marsha Ambrosius	Hip Hop Is Dead
"Throw Some D's" (Remix)	2007	Rich Boy, André 3000, Jim Jones, Murphy Lee, Nelly	Rich Boy
"West Coast Niggaz"	2007	Jay Rock, Kendrick Lamar	Watts Finest, Vol. III: the Watts Riots
"Anybody Killa"	2007	Tha Dogg Pound	Dogg Chit
"A Bay Bay (Remix)"	2007	Hurricane Chris, Lil Boosie, E-40, Birdman, Angie Locc and Jadakiss	51/50 Ratchet
"Streets"	2007	Bone Thugs-n-Harmony, will.i.am	Strength & Loyalty
"I'm from the Ghetto"	2007	DJ Khaled, Dre, Jadakiss, Trick Daddy	We the Best
"West Coast Voodoo"	2007	WC	Guilty by Affiliation
"Cut Throat"	2007	Yung Joc	Hustlenomics
"Nice"	2007	Chris Brown	Exclusive
"I Might Be"	2007	Gucci Mane, Shawnna	Back to the Trap House
"Ain't Sayin' Nothin'" (Remix)	2008	Fat Joe, Dre, Lil Wayne	none
"Think We Got a Problem"	2008	Sheek Louch, Bun B	Silverback Gorilla
"Taped Conversation" (Remix)	2008	Young Buck	Worth More Than 50 Cent's
"Where You At"	2008	Ray J	All I Feel
"Gifts" (Remix)	2008	Ray J, Lil Wayne, Shorty Mack	none
"Girls Around the World" (Remix)	2008	Lloyd, DJ Khaled, T.I., Yung Joc, Rick Ross, Ace Hood, Young Dro, Pitbull, Busta Rhymes	none
"Get Use to It"	2008	Ice Cube, WC, Keith David	Raw Footage
"Red Light"	2008	DJ Khaled	We Global
"Last Night" (Remix)	2008	Diddy, Keyshia Cole, Yung Joc, Big Boi, Rich Boy	none
"Call Up the Homies"	2008	Ludacris, Willy Northpole	Theater of the Mind
"Pain No More"	2008	E-40, Snoop Dogg	The Ball Street Journal
"Fight Song"	2008	Good Charlotte	Greatest Remixes
"They Roll"	2008	Nipsey Hussle	Bullets Ain't Got No Name Vol. 2
"Bullets (Remix)"	2008	Nipsey Hussle	Bullets Ain't Got No Name Vol. 2
"Right Here (Departed)" [Remix]	2008	Brandy	none
"Mafia Music" (Remix)	2009	Rick Ross, Ja Rule, Fat Joe	none
"Man in Your Life" (Remix)	2009	Joe	Signature
"Sunset"	2009	Ja Rule	The Mirror
"Three of the Best from the West"	2009	Mr. Capone-E, Snoop Dogg	Diary of a G
"Gangsta Shit"	2009	Triple C's	Custom Cars & Cycles
"Wait"	2009	Chris Brown, Trey Songz	Graffiti
"Hate on Us"	2009	Young Buck, DJ Haze	none
"Diamonds"	2009	Robin Thicke	Sex Therapy
"People Don't Know"	2010	Young Noble, E-40	Noble Justice: The Lost Songs
"All My Life (In the Ghetto)" [Remix]	2010	Jay Rock, Gorilla Zoe, Busta Rhymes	none
"Killas"	2010	Lil Jon, Elephant Man, Ice Cube, Whole Wheat Bread	Crunk Rock
"About Me"	2010	Raekwon	Only Built 4 Cuban Linx... Pt. II (Gold Edition)
"Drama"	2010	Ghostface Killah, Joell Ortiz	Apollo Kids
"The Blues"	2010	Young Buck	Back on My Buck Shit Vol. 2: Change of Plans
"Love Them Girls"	2011	Chris Brown	F.A.M.E.
"Carton of Milk"	2011	Jim Jones, Sen City	Capo
"Intro (MDMA)"	2011	Lloyd	King of Hearts
"Sleep When I'm Gone"	2011	DJ Khaled, Cee Lo Green, Busta Rhymes	We the Best Forever
"Welcome to My Hood" (Remix)	2011	DJ Khaled, T-Pain, Ludacris, Busta Rhymes, Twista, Birdman, Ace Hood, Fat Joe, Jadakiss, Bun B, Waka Flocka Flame	We the Best Forever
"I Am the Streets"	2011	Trae, Rick Ross, Lloyd	Street King
"Different People"	2012	Ace Hood	Starvation
"Switching Lanes"	2012	Tyga	Well Done 3
"I Remember"	2012	Tyga, Future	Well Done 3
"Dangerous"	2012	Beanie Sigel, Young Chris	This Time
"Ratchets (Remix)"	2012	Joe Moses, Snoop Dogg	none
"Ghetto Days"	2012	Tyrese, Kurupt	Invisible Bully: The Lost Tapes
"Errrybody"	2012	Masia One, Pharrell, Isis	none
"Cop & Rappers"	2012	Jim Jones	none
"Dos Equis"	2012	Xzibit, RBX	Napalm
"Movies"	2012	Xzibit, Crooked I, Slim the Mobster, Demrick	Napalm
"In the Name of Love (Do It All)"	2012	Cashis, Rick Ross, Joe Young, K-Young	The Art of Dying
"Let a Bitch Know"	2012	Compton Menace	Menace 2 Society Vol. 2
"Gucci Everything"	2012	Red Café, Chief Keef, French Montana, Fabolous	American Psycho
"Represented" (Remix)	2012	Metta World Peace, Big Noyd, Big Kap, Deacon, Bengi	The Passion
"Shake It"	2013	Rifah, Yo Gotti	none
"Gang Bang"	2013	Cap1, Young Jeezy	T.R.U. 2 It
"No Limit to This Real Shit"	2013	Master P, Nipsey Hussle	Al Capone
"Everything You Want"	2013	Tony Jones	none
"Ain't No Changing Me" (Remix)	2013	Compton Menace, Wiz Khalifa	none
"It Neva Rains"	2013	Tyga	Hotel California
"Let Loose"	2013	Jeremih	none
"Bang Bang"	2013	Problem, Bad Lucc	The Separation
"Ain't Worried About Nothin'" (Remix)	2013	French Montana, Crooked I, Problem, Dizzy Wright	none
"Priorities"	2013	Tech N9ne, Angel Davenport	Something Else
"Got My Heart"	2013	Ty Dolla Sign, Chris Brown	Beach House 2
"Paint tha Town"	2013	Birdman, Lil Wayne	Rich Gang
"Pour Up" (Remix)	2013	Clyde Carson, Young Jeezy	Playboy
"Side FX"	2013	Jason Derulo	Tattoos
"Rolling Stone"	2014	DJ Kay Slay, Young Buck, Papoose	The Rise of a City
"L.A. to Chiraq"	2014	Tyga	none
"Rolex Daytona"	2014	Kollegah	King
"Beautiful"	2014	Young Jeezy, Rick Ross	Seen It All: The Autobiography
"Connect"	2014	Popek	Monster 2
"Just Another Day"	2015	Asia Bryant	Compton: A Soundtrack by Dr. Dre
"Room Full of G's"	2015	League of Starz, Snoop Dogg, Joey Fatts, Dee	LOS.FM 2
"Homies"	2015	O.T. Genasis	Rhythm & Bricks
"Too Hood"	2015	Glasses Malone, Kirko Bangz	GlassHouse 2: Life Ain't Nuthin But...
"The Ghost of the Trigga"	2015	Spice 1, Twista	Haterz Nightmare
"Room in Here"	2016	Anderson .Paak, Sonyae Elise	Malibu
"Bad Boy on Death Row"	2016	Dave East	Kairi Chanel
"B4 the Documentary Dropped"	2016	Sap	Self-Employed
"Rosecrans"	2016	DJ Quik, Problem, Candace Boyd	Rosecrans - EP
"All the Way Up" (Westside Remix)	2016	Fat Joe, Remy Ma, Snoop Dogg, E-40, Infared, French Montana	none
"Sins of Our Feathers"	2016	Marsha Ambrosius	The Birth of a Nation: The Inspired By Album
"Pharaohs"	2019	Dom Kennedy, Jay 305, Moe Roy	Opm Presents: Young Nation, Vol. 2
"Candy"	2019	Casey Veggies	Organic
"Immortal"	2019	Trippie Redd	!
"Stop Cappin"	2019	Blueface	Dirt Bag
"Numb to My Feelings"	2019	RJ	On God
"How You Feel"	2019	Pacman Da Gunman, Rayven Justice	60th St
"Demons & Angels"	2019	G-Eazy, Miguel	Scary Nights
"On This Way"	2020	Joyner Lucas, Iyla	Evolution
"Nothin New"	2021	Russ	Chomp 2
"Jerseys in the Rafters"	2022	Snoop Dogg	BODR
"I Guess I Love It"	2022	Logic	Vinyl Days
"Allaho Akbar"	2023	Don Bigg, Obie Trice	Ein
"World Goes Round"	2024	Felc, Sicario	Planet Felc V2
"God Mode"	2025	Erick Sermon, Conway The Machine	Dynamic Duos

== Production discography ==
List of producer and songwriting credits
Track(s)	Year	Credit	Artist(s)	Album
02. "We Gon Make It"; (featuring Jack Knight)	2006	Songwriter	Diddy	Press Play
05. "Make the World Go Round"; (featuring the Game and Chris Brown)	2008	Co-producer (with Cool & Dre)	Nas	Untitled
10. "Uncle (Skit)"	2015	Producer	The Game	The Documentary 2
01. "New York (Skit)"	2015	Producer	The Game	The Documentary 2.5
04. "Fuck Orange Juice"	2016	Producer (with Terrace Martin)	The Game	1992

== Music videos ==
Title	Year	Director	Artist(s)
As main performer
"How We Do"	2004	Hype Williams	featuring 50 Cent
"Hate It or Love It"	2005	The Saline Project	featuring 50 Cent
"Dreams"	2005	Phillip Atwell	—N/a
"Put You on the Game"	2005	Damon Johnson	—N/a
"It's Okay (One Blood)"	2006	Jonathan Mannion	featuring Junior Reid
"Let's Ride"	2006	Little X	—N/a
"Wouldn't Get Far"	2007	Bryan Barber	featuring Kanye West
"Game's Pain"	2008	Dale Resteghini	featuring Keyshia Cole
"Dope Boys"	2008	Matt Alonzo	featuring Travis Barker
"My Life"	2008	Bryan Barber	featuring Lil Wayne
"Camera Phone"	2008	Kevin Connolly	featuring Ne-Yo
"400 Bars"	2010	Taydoe	—N/a
"Shake"	2010	Hype Williams	—N/a
"Red Nation"	2011	Parris	featuring Lil Wayne
"Pot of Gold"	2011	Bryan Barber	featuring Chris Brown
"Martians vs. Goblins"	2011	Matt Alonzo	featuring Tyler, the Creator and Lil Wayne
"The City"	2012	Matt Alonzo	featuring Kendrick Lamar
"No More Fun and Games"	2012	Ryan Wick	—N/a
"Celebration"	2012	Matt Alonzo	featuring Chris Brown, Tyga, Lil Wayne and Wiz Khalifa
"I Remember"	2012	Motion Family	featuring Young Jeezy and Future
"Celebration" (Remix)	2012	Taydoe	featuring Bone Thugs-n-Harmony
"Holy Water"	2012	Taydoe	—N/a
"Cough Up a Lung"	2012		—N/a
"Ali Bomaye"	2013	J.R. Saint	featuring 2 Chainz and Rick Ross
"Hit the J"	2013		featuring Lifestyle
"All That (Lady)"	2013		featuring Lil Wayne, Big Sean, Jeremih and Fabolous
"Bigger Than Me"	2014	Matt Alonzo	—N/a
"Or Nah"	2014	Matt Alonzo	featuring Eric Bellinger, Problem, AV and Too Short
"T.H.O.T."	2014	Matt Alonzo	featuring Problem, Bad Lucc and Huddy
"Same Hoes"	2014	Nefasto Reyes	featuring Nipsey Hussle, Ty Dolla Sign
"Ryda"	2015	Benny Boom	featuring Dej Loaf
"100"	2015	Theo Skudra	featuring Drake
"My Flag/Da Homies"	2015		featuring Ty Dolla Sign, Jay 305, AD, Mitch E-Slick, Joe Moses, RJ, and Scheme
"Roped Off"	2016	Loyal	featuring Problem and Boogie
"All Eyez"	2016	Benny Boom	featuring Jeremih
"Pest Control"	2016	Hoso Films & DerekDidlt	—N/a
"Baby You"	2016	Benny Boom	featuring Jason Derulo
"West Side"	2019	Aaron Green & Plilly Fly Boy	—N/a
"Stainless"	2019	Aaron Green	featuring Anderson Paak
As featured performer
"Playa's Only"	2005		R. Kelly featuring the Game
"Hustlers"	2006		Nas featuring the Game
"Make the World Go Round"	2008		Nas featuring the Game, Chris Brown
"Switch Lanes"	2013		Tyga featuring the Game
"#WHERESTHELOVE"	2016		The Black Eyed Peas featuring Diddy, Justin Timberlake, Usher, Jamie Foxx, the Game, Mary J. Blige, Nicole Scherzinger, DJ Khaled, Ty Dolla Sign, Jaden Smith, ASAP Rocky
"PHARAOHS"	2019		Don Kennedy featuring the Game, Jay 305, Moe Roy
Cameo appearances
"In da Club"	2003		50 Cent
"Stunt 101"	2003		G-Unit
"Poppin' Them Thangs"	2003		G-Unit
"Wanna Get to Know You"	2004		G-Unit featuring Joe
"Ride Wit U"	2004		Joe featuring G-Unit
"On Fire"	2004		Lloyd Banks
"Shorty Wanna Ride"/"Stomp"	2004		Young Buck
"Pills n Potions"	2014		Nicki Minaj
