= Cool & Dre production discography =

== Singles produced ==
List of singles as either producer or co-producer, with selected chart positions and certifications, showing year released, performing artists and album name
Title	Year	Peak chart positions										Certifications	Album
Title	Year	US	US R&B	US Rap	AUS	CAN	GER	IRL	NZ	SWI	UK	Certifications	Album
"Big Bank" (Cognito)	2002	—	—	—	—	—	—	—	—	—	—		Tru Cognizance
"New York" (Ja Rule featuring Fat Joe and Jadakiss)	2004	27	14	10	—	—	—	—	—	—	—		R.U.L.E.
"So Much More" (Fat Joe)	2005	81	34	18	—	—	—	—	—	—	—		All or Nothing
"Hate It or Love It" (The Game featuring 50 Cent)	2005	2	1	1	21	—	14	5	3	12	4	RIAA: Gold	The Documentary
"Holla at Me" (DJ Khaled featuring Lil Wayne, Paul Wall, Fat Joe, Rick Ross and Pitbull)	2006	59	24	15	—	—	—	—	—	—	—		Listennn... the Album
"Rodeo" (Juvenile)	2006	41	12	7	—	—	—	—	—	—	—	RIAA: Gold	Reality Check
"Chevy Ridin' High" (Dre featuring Rick Ross)	2006	—	—	—	—	—	—	—	—	—	—		—N/a
"Say I" (Christina Milian featuring Young Jeezy)	2006	21	13	—	45	—	38	15	23	23	4		So Amazin'
"100 Million" (Birdman featuring Young Jeezy, Rick Ross, and Lil Wayne)	2007	—	69	—	—	—	—	—	—	—	—		5 * Stunna
"We Made It" (Busta Rhymes featuring Linkin Park)	2008	65	—	—	40	37	11	12	13	24	10		—N/a
"Ya Heard Me" (B.G. featuring Juvenile, Lil Wayne and Trey Songz)	2008	—	—	—	—	—	—	—	—	—	—		Too Hood 2 Be Hollywood
"Ain't Sayin' Nothin'" (Fat Joe featuring Plies and Dre)	2008	93	—	—	—	—	—	—	—	—	—		The Elephant in the Room
"My Life" (The Game featuring Lil Wayne)	2008	21	15	4	—	42	—	36	—	49	34		LAX
"Peace Sign/Index Down" (Gym Class Heroes featuring Busta Rhymes)	2008	—	—	—	—	—	—	—	—	—	—		The Quilt
"Make the World Go Round" (Nas featuring The Game and Chris Brown)	2008	—	—	—	—	—	—	—	—	—	—		Untitled Nas album
"All My Life (In the Ghetto)" (Jay Rock featuring Lil Wayne and will.i.am)	2008	—	10	—	—	—	—	—	—	—	—		Follow Me Home
"Camera Phone" (The Game featuring Ne-Yo)	2009	—	—	—	—	—	—	—	—	—	48		LAX
"Chillin" (Wale featuring Lady Gaga)	2009	99	—	—	29	73	—	19	—	—	12		Attention Deficit
"On Fire" (Lil Wayne)	2009	62	54	25	—	—	—	—	—	—	—		Rebirth
"If It Ain't About Money" (Fat Joe featuring Trey Songz)	2010	—	57	25	—	—	—	—	—	—	—		The Darkside Vol. 1
"Red Nation" (The Game featuring Lil Wayne)	2011	62	22	—	—	—	—	—	—	—	—		The R.E.D. Album
"It's Good" (Lil Wayne featuring Drake and Jadakiss)	2011	79	—	—	—	—	—	—	—	—	—		Tha Carter IV
"Celebration" (The Game featuring Chris Brown, Tyga, Wiz Khalifa and Lil Wayne)	2012	81	24	19	—	—	—	—	—	—	—		Jesus Piece
"All That (Lady)" (The Game featuring Lil Wayne, Big Sean, Fabolous and Jeremih)	2013	—	48	—	—	—	—	—	—	—	—		Jesus Piece
"All the Way Up" (Fat Joe and Remy Ma featuring French Montana)	2016	38	14	7	22	—	—	—	—	—	—	RIAA: 2× Platinum	Plata o Plomo
"Cookin" (Fat Joe, Remy Ma and French Montana featuring RySoValid)	2016	—	—	—	—	—	—	—	—	—	—		Plata o Plomo
"Money Showers" (featuring Ty Dolla Sign)	2016	—	—	—	—	—	—	—	—	—	—		Plata o Plomo
"Don't Mind" (Kent Jones)	2016	9	4	2	23	39	29	67	43	65	26	RIAA: Platinum	Tours
"Heartbreak" (featuring The-Dream and Vindata)	2017	—	—	—	—	—	—	—	—	—	—		Plata o Plomo
"So Excited" (Fat Joe featuring Dre)	2017	— (Note: "So Excited" did not enter the Billboard Hot 100, but peaked at number 24 on the Bubbling Under Hot 100 Singles chart.)	— (Note: "So Excited" did not enter the Hot R&B/Hip-Hop Songs chart, but peaked at number six on the Bubbling Under R&B/Hip-Hop Singles chart.)	—	—	—	—	—	—	—	—		Non-album singles
"Pick It Up" (Fat Joe featuring Dre)	2018	—	—	—	—	—	—	—	—	—	—		Non-album singles
"Momma" (Fat Joe, Dre and Big Sean)	2018	—	—	—	—	—	—	—	—	—	—		Non-album singles
"Attention" (Fat Joe, Dre featuring Chris Brown)	2018	—	—	—	—	—	—	—	—	—	—		Non-album singles
"Pullin" (Fat Joe, Dre and Lil Wayne)	2019	—	—	—	—	—	—	—	—	—	—		Family Ties
"Yes" (Fat Joe, Cardi B and Anuel AA)	2019	— (Note: "Yes" did not enter the Billboard Hot 100, but peaked at number 17 on the Bubbling Under Hot 100 chart.)	—	—	—	—	—	—	—	—	—		Family Ties
"Deep" (Fat Joe and Dre)	2019	—	—	—	—	—	—	—	—	—	—		Family Ties
"—" denotes a recording that did not chart or was not released in that territory.

== 2002 ==
=== Fat Joe – Loyalty ===
- 03. "Prove Something"
- 04. "TS Piece"
- 07. "Born in the Ghetto"
- 08. "Crush Tonight"
- 10. "All I Need"
- 11. "Life Goes On"
- 12. "Loyalty"

=== Ja Rule – Last Temptation ===
- 13. "Destiny (Outro)"

=== Trick Daddy - Thug Holiday ===
- 07. "Let Me Ride"

=== Various artists – All About the Benjamins ===
- 01. Trina – "Told Y'All" {found also on Diamond Princess}

=== Angie Martinez – Animal House ===
- 06. "Take You Home"
- 08. "We Can Get It On"
- 09. "What's That Sound"
- 11. "Waitin' On"

== 2003 ==
=== Killer Mike – Monster ===
- 06. "All 4 U"
- 10. "Home of the Brave"

=== Various artists – 2 Fast 2 Furious ===
- 11. Fat Joe – "We Ridin'"
- 13. Dirtbag – "Fuck What a Nigga Say..."

=== Various artists – Bad Boys II ===
- 05. Fat Joe & Diddy – "Girl I'm a Bad Boy"

== 2004 ==
=== 8Ball & MJG – Living Legends ===
- 18. "Confessions"

=== Terror Squad – True Story ===
- 03. "Hum Drum"
- 05. "Take Me Home" (featuring Dre) (co–produced by Streetrunner)
- 10. "Let Them Things Go" (featuring Dre & Young Selah)

=== Jacki–O – Poe Little Rich Girl ===
- 02. "Ms. Jacki"

=== Trick Daddy – Thug Matrimony: Married to the Streets ===
- 15. "Thugs About"

=== Ja Rule - R.U.L.E. ===
- 05. "New York" (featuring Fat Joe and Jadakiss)

== 2005 ==
=== Chamillionaire – The Sound of Revenge ===
- 05. "No Snitchin'" (featuring Bun B)

=== Chris Brown – Chris Brown ===
- 09. "What's My Name"

=== C-Ride ===
- 00.We Came
- 00.Fresh
- 00.Chicken & Beef feat. Dre
- 00.Its An Epidemic
- 00.Im that Fly
- 00.Get In Line
- 00.Super Star
- 00.Im All Dat

=== Fat Joe – All or Nothing ===
- 04. "So Much More"
- 05. "My Fofo"
- 06. "Rock Ya Body"
- 12. "I Can Do U"
- 13. "So Hot" (featuring R. Kelly)

=== Lil Wayne – Tha Carter II ===
- 21. "Get Over" (featuring Nikki)

=== Slim Thug – Already Platinum ===
- 13. "Miss Mary"

=== Teairra Mari – Roc-A-Fella Presents: Teairra Mari ===
- 08. "Get Down Tonight"

=== Trina – Glamorest Life ===
- 01. "Sum Mo" (featuring T.I.)
- 13. "Lil' Mama" (featuring Dre)

=== The Game – The Documentary ===
- 04. "Hate It or Love It" (featuring 50 Cent)

== 2006 ==
=== Juvenile - Reality Check ===
- 05. "Rodeo"

=== Christina Milian – So Amazin' ===
- 01. "Say I" (featuring Young Jeezy)
- 02. "Twisted"
- 03. "Gonna Tell Everybody"
- 04. "Who's Gonna Ride" (featuring Three 6 Mafia)
- 05. "So Amazing" (featuring Dre)
- 06. "Hot Boy" (featuring Dre)
- 07. "Foolin'"
- 08. "My Lovin' Goes"
- 09. "Just a Little Bit"
- 12. "Tonight (International Bonus)"
- 13. "She Don't Know "

=== Dirtbag - Eyez Above Water ===
- 00. "Soda Boy" (featuring C-Ride)
- 00. "Ladies Love Me"
- 00. "It Feels Amazin'" (featuring Dre)
- 00. "Haters" (featuring T.I.)
- 00. "Play Wit It" (featuring Dre)

=== DJ Khaled – Listennn... The Album ===
- 06. "Holla at Me" (featuring Lil Wayne, Paul Wall, Fat Joe, Rick Ross and Pitbull)
- 08. "Destroy You" (featuring Krayzie Bone & Twista)
- 10. "Candy Paint" (featuring Slim Thug, Trina & Chamillionaire)
- 15. "Movement" (featuring Dre)

=== E-40 - My Ghetto Report Card ===
- 10. "Block Boi" (featuring Miko & Stressmatic) (produced with Studio ToN)

=== Ghostface Killah – Fishscale ===
- 24. "Three Bricks" (featuring Raekwon& Notorious B.I.G.) {Deluxe Edition Bonus Track}

=== Juvenile – The Reality Check ===
- 05. "Rodeo"
- 09. "Break a Brick Down" (featuring Dre)

=== 3LW – Point of No Return ===
- 00. "The Club Is Over"

=== Kelis – Kelis Was Here ===
- 07. "Goodbyes"

=== Nashawn – Napalm ===
- 15. "Money Machine" (featuring Nas, Ying Yang Twins & Jungle)

=== Remy Ma – There's Something about Remy: Based on a True Story ===
- 04. "Tight" (featuring Fat Joe)
- 18. "Still" (featuring Dre)

=== Rhymefest – Blue Collar ===
- 08. "More" (featuring Kanye West)
- 10. "All Girls Cheat" (featuring Mario)

=== Rick Ross – Port of Miami ===
- 03. "Blow" (featuring Dre)
- 07. "Boss" (featuring Dre)

=== Young Jeezy – The Inspiration ===
- 09. "Streets on Lock"

== 2007 ==
=== Beanie Sigel – The Solution ===
- 02. "Bout That (Let Me Know)"

=== Chingy – Hate It or Love It ===
- 13. "Roll on 'Em" (featuring Rick Ross)

=== DJ Khaled – We the Best ===
- 04. "Brown Paper Bag" (featuring Dre, Young Jeezy, Juelz Santana, Rick Ross, Lil Wayne & Fat Joe)
- 07. "I'm From the Ghetto" (featuring Dre, The Game, Jadakiss & Trick Daddy)
- 11. "The Originators" (featuring Bone Thugs-N-Harmony)
- 12. "New York Is Back" (featuring Jadakiss, Fat Joe & Ja Rule)
- 15. "Choppers" (featuring Dre, Joe Hound & C-Ride)

=== Freeway – Free at Last ===
- 13. "Lights Get Low" (featuring Rick Ross & Dre)

=== Jody Breeze ===
- 00. "Let's Ride"

=== Joe – Ain't Nothin' Like Me ===
- 09. "Let's Just Do It" (featuring Fabolous)
- 11. "Just Relax" (featuring Dre)

=== Tru-Life – Tru York ===
- 03. "If You Want To"
- 14. "Scarface"

=== Yung Joc – Hustlenomics ===
- 02. "Play Your Cards"

=== Birdman - 5 * Stunna ===
- 06. "100 Million" (featuring Young Jeezy, Rick Ross, and Lil Wayne)

== 2008 ==
=== Fat Joe - The Elephant in the Room ===
- 2. "Ain't Sayin' Nothin'" (featuring Dre & Plies)

=== Ace Hood – Gutta ===
- 14. "Ghetto" (featuring Dre)

=== B.G. – Too Hood 2 Be Hollywood ===
- 10. "Ya Heard Me" (featuring Juvenile, Lil Wayne and Trey Songz)
- 00. "Look Girl" (featuring Ray J)

=== Busta Rhymes – We Made It (CDS) ===
- 01. "We Made It" (feat. Linkin Park)

=== David Banner – The Greatest Story Ever Told ===
- 08. "A Girl"
- 16. "Fuck You Hoes" (featuring Jim Jones)

=== DJ Khaled – We Global ===
- 05. "I'm On" (featuring Nas & Cool)

=== DJ Pharris – Hood Radio ===
- 00. "Stop" (featuring DJ Khaled, The Game, Rick Ross & Sly Polaroid)

=== The Game – LAX ===
- 05. "My Life" (featuring Lil Wayne)
- 06. "Money"
- 01. "Big Dreams" (Deluxe Edition Bonus CD)
- 02. "Camera Phone" (featuring Ne–Yo) (Deluxe Edition Bonus CD)
- 00. "Red Magic" (featuring Lil Wayne)

=== Gym Class Heroes – The Quilt ===
- 09. "Don't Tell Me It's Over" (featuring Dre & Lil Wayne)
- 10. "Live Forever (Fly with Me)" (featuring Daryl Hall)
- 12. "Home" (featuring Dre)

=== Jay Rock – Follow Me Home ===
- 01. "All My Life" (featuring Lil Wayne & will.i.am)

=== Lil Wayne – Tha Carter III ===
- 07. "Phone Home"

=== Ludacris – "The Preview" ===
- 14. "Throw It Up" (Busta Rhymes featuring Lil Wayne & Ludacris)

=== Omar Cruz – Sign of the Cruz ===
- A9. "Gangsta Music" (featuring The Game)

=== Q-Tip – Smirnoff Signature Mix Series (VLS) ===
- A3. "Midnight '08 (Radio Edit)"

=== Scarface – Emeritus ===
- 03. "Forget About Me" (featuring Lil Wayne & Bun B)

=== Nas - Untitled ===
- 04. "Make the World Go Round" (featuring Chris Brown & The Game)

== 2009 ==
=== Busta Rhymes – Back on My B.S. ===
- 12. "Don't Believe 'Em" (featuring Akon & T.I.)

=== Lil Wayne – No Ceilings ===
- 18. "No Ceilings" (featuring Birdman)

=== Wale – Attention: Deficit ===
- 05. "World Tour" (featuring Jazmine Sullivan)
- 09. "Chillin" (featuring Lady Gaga)

=== C-Ride - Automatic Vibe ===
- 02. "Dat What It Iz" (featuring The Game & Jimmy Dade)
- 14. "Otha S**t"
- 17. "Lights Low" (featuring 2 Pistols & Young Joe)
- 25. "Freak By Nature"

=== Young Money Entertainment – We Are Young Money ===
- 01. "Gooder"

=== Queen Latifah – Persona ===
- Entire Album (except 14)

=== Triple C's – Custom Cars & Cycles ===
- 14. "Hustla" (featuring Masspike Miles)

=== 2 Pistols – Arrogant ===
- "Lights Low Pt. 2" (featuring Young Joe & C-Ride)

== 2010 ==
=== Lil Wayne – Rebirth ===
- 04. "Da Da Da"
- 05. "Paradice"
- 06. "Get a Life"
- 07. "On Fire"
- 13. "I'll Die for You"

=== Kevin Rudolf - To the Sky ===
- 08. "Spit In Your Face" (featuring Lil Wayne)

=== Game – The Red Room ===
- 19. "Shake" (TRV$ Remix)

=== Fat Joe – The Darkside Vol. 1 ===
- 02. "Valley of Death"
- 07. "If It Ain't About Money" (featuring Trey Songz)
- 13. "At Last Supremacy" (featuring Busta Rhymes)

=== Yo Gotti - n/a ===
- "Teenage Numbers" (featuring Rick Ross)

=== Lil Wayne – I Am Not a Human Being ===
- 08. "Popular" (featuring Lil Twist)

=== Game – Brake Lights ===
- 03. "Cold Blood" (featuring Dre and Busta Rhymes)
- 04. "MIA (3 Heats: Lebron James, Bosh, Wade)"
- 05. "Stop" (featuring Rick Ross)
- 06. "Street Riders" (featuring Nas and Akon)
- 07. "HaHaHaHaHa"
- 09. "That's the Way the Game Goes" (featuring Shawty Lo)
- 10. "Ecstasy"
- 13. "You Are the Blood"

== 2011 ==
=== Game – Purp & Patron ===
- 12. "The Kill"

=== Game – Hoodmorning (notypo): Candy Coronas ===
- 13. "Infrared"
- 15. "Red" (featuring Redman)

=== Game – The R.E.D. Album ===
- 02. "The City" (featuring Kendrick Lamar)
- 05. "Red Nation" (featuring Lil Wayne)
- 07. "Good Girls Gone Bad (featuring Drake)
- 00. "Big Money"
- 00. "Shake"

=== Lil Wayne – Tha Carter IV ===
- 11. "So Special" (featuring John Legend)
- 14. "It's Good" (featuring Drake and Jadakiss)
- 16. "I Like the View" (Deluxe Edition Bonus Track)

=== Tyga - Well Done ===
- 4. "Wonder Woman" (featuring Chris Brown)
- 00. "Mr. Night Bros" (featuring Game & Lil Wayne)

== 2012 ==
=== Alley Boy – The Gift of Discernment ===
- 13. "All for You"

=== Don Trip – Guerrilla ===
- 03. "Allen Iverson"

=== Don Trip – Help Is on the Way ===
- 01. "Shelter"
- 07. "Still Got Love..." (featuring Jeremih)
- 08. "Too Little, Too Late"

=== Game – California Republic ===
- 04. "Hit the J" (featuring Lifestyle)

=== Tyga – Careless World: Rise of the Last King ===
- 18. "Let It Show" (featuring J. Cole)

=== Rick Ross – God Forgives, I Don't ===
- 04. "Ashamed"

=== The Game – Jesus Piece ===
- 04. "Pray" (featuring J. Cole & JMSN)
- 06. "All That (Lady)" (featuring Lil Wayne, Big Sean, Jeremih and Fabolous)
- 07. "Heaven's Arms"
- 10. "Can't Get Right" (featuring K. Roosevelt)

== 2013 ==
=== Lil Wayne – I Am Not a Human Being II ===
- 17. "Hot Revolver" (featuring Dre)

=== Fat Joe – The Darkside III ===
- 02. "Madison Squares" (co-produced by Sap)
- 09. "Bass"

=== DJ Khaled - Suffering from Success ===
- 10. "Mercialago" (feat. Birdman & Meek Mill)

=== Tyga - Hotel California ===
- 4. "Diss Song" {produced with Sap, Jesse Jackson)
- 9. "It Neva Rains (feat. Game)

=== The Game – OKE: Operation Kill Everything ===
- 05. "F.I.V.E." (featuring Chris Brown and Lil Wayne) (co-produced by Sap)
- 07. "Breakfast With Al Pacino"

=== Yo Gotti – I Am ===
- 01. "I Am"

== 2014 ==
=== French Montana – Coke Boys 4 ===
- 06. "All for You" (French Montana featuring Lana Del Rey and Wiz Khalifa)

=== Ace Hood – Starvation III ===
- 09. "Home Invasion" (featuring Vado) (produced with Yung Ladd)

=== Vado – Sinatra ===
- 02. "Week Ago" (featuring Dre)

== 2015 ==
=== Currensy – Pilot Talk III ===
- 01. "Opening Credits"
- 07. "The 560 SL" (featuring Wiz Khalifa) (produced with Edclusive)
- 09. "Life I Choose" (featuring J. Townsend)
- 10. "Pot Jar" (featuring Jadakiss)
- 12. "All I Know"

=== French Montana – Casino Life 2: Brown Bag Legend ===
- 13. "In the Sun" (featuring Curren$y)

=== MGK - General Admission: All Admission Deluxe ===
- 22. "Life"

=== Fat Trel – Georgetown ===
- 04. "Brrrr" (featuring Rick Ross and Wale)

=== Lil Wayne – Free Weezy Album ===
- 15. "Pick Up Your Heart"

=== The Game – The Documentary 2 ===
- 1-06. "Dollar and a Dream" (featuring Ab-Soul)
- 2-06. "From Adam" (featuring Lil Wayne)

=== Currensy – Canal Street Confidential ===
- 09. "Superstar" (featuring Ty Dolla Sign)

== 2016 ==
=== The Game – The Documentary 2 Collector's Edition ===
- 01. "Ride Solo" (produced with Kent Jones)
- 02. "Do It to You" (featuring Trey Songz) (produced with Kent Jones)

=== Kent Jones – Tours ===
- 05. "Don't Mind" (produced with Cool & Dre and DJ Khaled)

=== Fat Joe & Remy Ma ===
- 00. "All the Way Up (Remix)" (featuring French Montana, Infrared and JAY-Z) (produced with Edclusive)

=== Curren$y – Stoned On Ocean EP ===
- 01. - 07 "Full Extended Play Mixtape" (featuring Wiz Khalifa and Styles P)

== 2017 ==
=== Wale - Shine ===
- 01. "Thank God" (produced with 808-Ray)

=== Fat Joe & Remy Ma - Plata O Plomo ===
- 02. "Swear to God" (featuring Kent Jones)
- 03. "Spaghetti" (featuring Kent Jones) (produced with Edsclusive)
- 04. "All the Way Up (featuring French Montana) (produced with Edsclusive)
- 07. "Go Crazy" (featuring Sevyn Streeter and BJ the Chicago Kid) (produced with 808-Ray)
- 10. "Money Showers" (featuring Ty Dolla Sign
- 12. "Dreamin" (featuring Stephanie Mills)

== 2018 ==
=== Royce da 5'9" - Book of Ryan ===
- 10. "Boblo Boat" (featuring J. Cole) (produced with 808-Ray)

=== N.O.R.E. - 5E ===
- 02. "Big Chain" (featuring Fabolous)

=== The Carters - Everything Is Love ===
- 01. "Summer" (produced with Beyoncé, JAY-Z and El Michels)
- 05. "713" (produced with Beyoncé, JAY-Z, 808-Ray and Fred Ball)
- 08. "Black Effect (produced with Beyoncé and JAY-Z)
- 10. "Salud!" (produced with Beyoncé, JAY-Z and Beat Butcha)

== 2019 ==
=== Ameer Vann - Emmanuel ===
- 01. "Emmanuel" (produced with Deats)
- 03. "Glock 19" (produced with Cubeatz)
- 05. "Sunday Night"

=== BJ the Chicago Kid - 1123 ===
- 08. "Playa's Ball" (feat. Rick Ross) {produced with 808 Ray & Aaron Sledge)
- 09. "Sap" Sap, Eric Kovacs

== 2020 ==
=== Lil Wayne - Funeral (Lil Wayne album) ===
- 18. "Bastard (Satan's Kid) {produced with Spanish Jose)

=== Megan Thee Stallion - Good News ===
- 2. "Circles" {produced with Rick Starr DidIt)

=== Big Sean - Detroit 2 ===
- 8. "ZTFO" Produced with No ID, Teddy Walton, Rogét Chahayed & Spanish Josh)

== 2021 ==
=== Wale - Folarin II ===
- 1. "Poke It Out" (feat. J. Cole)

== 2022 ==
=== Mary J. Blige - Good Morning Gorgeous ===
- 9.. Come See About Me (feat. Leon Michaels)
- 10. "On Top" (feat. Fivio Foreign) {produced with Black Din Me)

== 2023 ==
=== Lil Wayne - Tha Fix B4 the Six ===
- 5. "To the Bank" (feat. Cool & Dre) {produced with 808 Ray)

=== Gucci Mane & B.G. - Choppers & Bricks ===
- 11. "Project Baby" (featuring C-Murder) (produced with Dope Studio and Levi)

=== Killer Mike - Michael ===
- 5. Slummer (feat. Jagged Edge)
- 3. NRich (feat. 6Lack and Eryn Allen Kane

=== Dave East - Fortune Favors the Bold ===
- 2. "Come 2 Far" (feat. Kid Capri & Cool & Dre) produced with 808-Ray, Mike Ehrhart, Shawn Hibbler & Jay Safari)

=== Meek Mill & Rick Ross - Too Good to Be True ===
- 04. "Go to Hell" (feat. Beams)

=== Busta Rhymes - Blockbusta ===
- 3. "OK" (feat. Cool & Dre) (produced with Lovi, YeaDatzLewi & MacShooter)

== 2024 ==
=== Conway the Machine - Slant Face Killah ===
- 3. "Give & Give" (feat. Cool & Dre) 808 Ray

=== Fat Joe - The World Changed On Me ===
- 1. "Talkin' Hot (feat. Dre & Karma Nova)
- 2. "Mini Birki (feat. Cool & Dre & Ty $) {produced with G06 Beatz, Hero STW, HeroSavesTheWerld, KD-Beatz, Khamail Dunigan, Lovi, Michael Mahko, Park Geon & Splited Stupid}
- 3. "Us" (feat. Remy Ma & Chris Rock) {produced with 808 Ray, CRATER}
- 5. "Me n U" (feat. Dre)
- 8. "Fresh" (feat. Tony Sunshine)
- 11. "They Don't Love You"
- 00. "Outta Control (feat. Cool & Dre and Remy Ma) produced with 808-Ray}

== 2025 ==
=== Memphis Bleek - APT 3D ===
- 3. "You Should Know" (feat. Cool & Dre)
- 4. "On My Way" (feat. Jon Rise)
