= So Excited =

So Excited may refer to:

- "So Excited" (Fat Joe song), 2017
- "So Excited" (Janet Jackson song), 2006
- "So Excited", a song by Christine McVie from Christine McVie
- So Excited!, 1982 album by American vocal group the Pointer Sisters
- So Excited, a 2014 album by Clara Morgane

== See also ==
- I'm So Excited (disambiguation)
