= Brake Lights (mixtape) =

Mixtape by Game
- Released: August 3, 2010
- Recorded: 2010
- Genres: Hip hop, gangsta rap
- Length: 1:14:00
- Labels: Black Wall Street; SkeeTV
- Producers: The Dope Boyz; DJ Khalil; Cool & Dre; Rich Skillz; Dr. Dre; Paperboy Fabe; Lex Luger; J.R. Rotem; Ced L. Young

Game chronology
| The Red Room (2010) | Brake Lights (2010) | Purp & Patron (2011) |

Brake Lights is the ninth mixtape by West Coast rapper Game released as a free online download on August 3, 2010. The mixtape is hosted by DJ Skee. The mixtape includes all new tracks and was released in promotion to Game's upcoming album The R.E.D. Album. Production is handled by DJ Khalil, Cool & Dre, Dr. Dre, Lex Luger, J.R. Rotem and more. Features on the mixtape include Snoop Dogg, Busta Rhymes, Rick Ross, Nas, Akon, T.I., Robin Thicke, Shawty Lo, Yung Joc, Waka Flocka Flame and more.

On the title of the mixtape, DJ Skee said "Reason we named it Brake Lights is because it's something you don't see if you're following us often — we don't stop."

Brake Lights was premiered by XXL at midnight on August 3, 2010. The mixtape was met with generally positive reviews from Miami New Times, Los Angeles Times and HipHopDX.

== Track listing ==
| No. | Title | Original instrumental/Producer(s) | Length |
|---|---|---|---|
| 1. | "Brake Lights" | The Dope Boyz | 3:51 |
| 2. | "Trading Places" (featuring Snoop Dogg) | "Almost Famous" by Eminem | 4:29 |
| 3. | "Cold Blood" (featuring Dre and Busta Rhymes) | Cool & Dre | 2:39 |
| 4. | "MIA (3 Heats)" | Cool & Dre | 3:34 |
| 5. | "Stop" (featuring Rick Ross) | Cool & Dre | 3:29 |
| 6. | "Street Riders" (featuring Nas and Akon) | Cool & Dre | 4:36 |
| 7. | "HaHaHaHaHa" | Cool & Dre | 3:09 |
| 8. | "Pushin' It" (featuring T.I. and Robin Thicke) | Rich Skillz | 4:15 |
| 9. | "That's the Way the Game Goes" (featuring Shawty Lo) | Cool & Dre | 4:33 |
| 10. | "Ecstasy" | Cool & Dre | 4:25 |
| 11. | "Phantom of the Opera" (featuring Robin Thicke) | Dr. Dre | 3:26 |
| 12. | "Do It B.I.G." (featuring Yung Joc) | Paperboy Fabe | 3:25 |
| 13. | "You Are the Blood" | Cool & Dre | 3:11 |
| 14. | "Get 'Em" (featuring Waka Flocka Flame) | Lex Luger | 3:55 |
| 15. | "Cherry Kool-Aid" (featuring Maad Maxx and X.O.) | The Dope Boyz | 3:58 |
| 16. | "Heels & Dresses" (featuring X.O. and Ty Dolla Sign) | Cool & Dre | 3:30 |
| 17. | "Blackout" | J.R. Rotem | 3:56 |
| 18. | "Stadium Music" | Rich Skillz | 4:26 |
| 19. | "Hustlin' (Champion's Anthem)" | Ced L. Young | 5:13 |
| Total length: | | | 1:14:00 |

Sample credits

- "Trading Places" recycles "Almost Famous" by Eminem
- "MIA (3 Heats)" samples "Time" by Lou Rawls
- "Stop" samples "Mr. Crowley" by Ozzy Osbourne
- "Street Riders" recycles "Hustla" by Triple C's featuring Masspike Miles
- "HaHaHaHaHa" samples "What's Beef?" by the Notorious B.I.G.
- "Pushin' It" recycles "Pushin' It" by Ja Rule featuring Robin Thicke
- "Do It B.I.G." samples "Juicy" by the Notorious B.I.G.
- "You Are the Blood" samples "You Are the Blood" by Sufjan Stevens
- "Cherry Kool-Aid" samples "Am I a Good Man" by Them Two
- "Heels & Dresses" samples "The Robot With Human Hair, Pt. 1" by Dance Gavin Dance
- "Blackout" samples "No Easy Way Out" by Robert Tepper
- "Hustlin' (Champion's Anthem)" recycles "Let Me In" by Pill
