= I'm So Excited (disambiguation) =

"I'm So Excited" is a 1982 song by the Pointer Sisters.

I'm So Excited may also refer to:

- I'm So Excited!, a 2013 film directed by Pedro Almodóvar that uses this Pointer Sisters song in its soundtrack.
- "I'm So Excited" (Anja Nissen song) (2014)

== See also ==
- So Excited (disambiguation)
