= Attention (Fat Joe song) =

Single by Fat Joe & Dre featuring Chris Brown
- Released: July 23, 2018
- Recorded: 2018
- Genre: Hip hop; R&B; disco
- Length: 4:01
- Label: RNG; Empire
- Songwriters: Jose Cartagena; Christopher Brown; Andre "Dre" Christopher Lyon
- Producer: Scott Storch

Fat Joe singles chronology
"Don't Know" (2018)	"Attention" (2018)	"Pullin'" (2019)

Chris Brown singles chronology
"Date Night (Same Time)" (2018)	"Attention" (2018)	"Overdose" (2018)

Music video
- "Attention" on YouTube

"Attention" is a song by American hip hop artists Fat Joe and Dre, in collaboration with American singer Chris Brown. It was released as a digital download on July 23, 2018 as the third stand-alone single from the duo made of Fat Joe and Dre. The song was produced by Scott Storch.

== Background ==
Joe and Brown previously tag-teamed on their 2011 single "Another Round", that was certified gold by RIAA. According to Fat Joe, collaborate with Brown for "Another Round" in the studio was simply a no-brainer. Joe told Billboard that it is "always an honor" to walk with Brown, whom he called "a beautiful talent. Me and Dre said we need Chris on here [and] it would be fire".

"Attention" was supposed to be the lead single of Joe and Dre's collaborative project, however it ended up not being on it.

== Music video ==
On August 6, 2018, Fat Joe announced that they shot the video that day, and later on September 4, 2018, he released the music video for "Attention", directed by Eif Rivera, on his YouTube and Vevo account. The video was shot in Los Angeles. Ashanti made a cameo appearance.

== Charts ==
Chart performance for "Attention"
Chart (2018)	Peak position
US Mainstream R&B/Hip-Hop (Billboard)	38
US Rhythmic Airplay (Billboard)	38
