= So Amazin' =

- Standard edition

Studio album by Christina Milian
- Released: April 19, 2006
- Recorded: 2005–2006
- Genres: R&B; club; hip hop
- Length: 42:24
- Labels: Def Jam; Island; Mercury
- Producers: Cool & Dre; The Heavyweights

Christina Milian chronology
It's About Time (2004)	So Amazin' (2006)	Best Of (2006)

Singles from So Amazin
- 1. "Say I" Released: January 17, 2006

So Amazin' is the third studio album by American singer Christina Milian. The album, her first studio release since 2004's It's About Time, was released by Def Jam Recordings and Island Records on April 19, 2006, in Japan, on May 8 in Europe, and on May 16 in the United States. Unlike previous records, which had contributions from many producers, Milian wrote and produced So Amazin' primarily with hip hop producers Cool & Dre. During production, Milian was mentored by L.A. Reid and executive producer Jay-Z of Def Jam Recordings.

The album's musical style is primarily urban and hip hop in contrast to the pop and R&B sounds of Milian's previous albums, a change suggested by Island Def Jam. Following criticism over her previous albums for a lack of consistency, Milian had ten of the album's tracks produced by Cool & Dre. Lyrically, the album was inspired by Milian's breakup with Nick Cannon. So Amazin' was completed within a three-month period, and Milian received writing credit for nine of the album's songs.

The album debuted and peaked at number 11 on the US Billboard 200, and sold a total of 163,000 copies. Internationally, the album charted in the United Kingdom, France and Switzerland. The album's only single, "Say I", featuring rapper Jeezy, saw peak positions of number four in the UK, and number 21 in the United States. The critical response to So Amazin' was mixed. The album's production and "Say I" were generally praised, while several critics did not feel that the album showcased Milian's personality. Two weeks after the release of So Amazin', Milian was dropped from Island Def Jam Records.

== Background ==
Milian's previous release, It's About Time (2004), was her second studio album, but served as her debut in the US. The critical response to the album was mixed to generally negative. The club tracks, most notably lead single "Dip It Low", were praised; however, the ballads were said to be disappointing. The album only performed modestly commercially; it debuted and peaked at number 14 on the Billboard 200 album chart, selling a total of 382,000 copies, but managed to achieve Silver certification in the UK by the British Phonographic Industry. The album received a Grammy Award nomination for "Best Contemporary R&B Album" in 2005.

Following the album's release, Milian was cast in a lead role in the horror film Pulse, starring alongside Kristen Bell and Ian Somerhalder. Milian traveled to Romania for filming, and later discovered that her then-boyfriend Nick Cannon had cheated on her while she was away. Milian said in an interview, "it was heartbreaking for me. I was a good girl, a really loyal girl – and I got beat real."

Whereas Milian's previous albums had pop and R&B stylings, she was encouraged by Island Def Jam to target a new audience and release an urban record. Explaining the change, Milian said that one of her main problems was that previous releases would often find mainstream success, but would be relatively unsuccessful on urban radio. As an R&B artist, she wanted to build her core audience–a true fan base that would support her through time–to increase her career's longevity. The main purpose of her genre change was to go back to the streets and add to her core audience.

== Production ==
To create a more urban record, Milian had a list of producers that she wanted to work with for So Amazin'. She said that in most cases, even when she had R&B producers, most songs would end up being pop instead of R&B. L.A. Reid suggested to Milian that she should work with Cool & Dre, with whom she ended up working with as the first people to start off the album. Although Milian was originally supposed to work with several different music producers, she felt that the chemistry they had in the first week was so "instant and real" that she felt she could not get a better "vibe" with anybody else other than them. Together, they produced four songs in the first few days, which prompted Milian to ask her label if she could continue working with the duo. At the same time, Cool & Dre called their managers to ask if they could continue working with Milian. Milian felt that it was "just the perfect connection", and that working with them "just felt so original". The singer described Cool & Dre as "beat makers", rather than just hip-hop producers, and believed that she was really able to express herself lyrically through their music.

Milian ended up working with Cool & Dre on the majority of the production of the album, producing ten of the album's eleven tracks together. Milian also wrote the track "Y'all Ain't Nothin'" with Ne-Yo, which was produced by The Heavyweights. Features on the album include Three 6 Mafia, Young Jeezy, and Dre of Cool & Dre. While working on the song, "Who's Gonna Ride", Dre ran into Three 6 Mafia at the studio and they agreed to feature on the song. The album completed within a three-month period, whereas Milian's previous albums would take six months to a year.

Milian received writing credit for nine songs on the album. Milian did not try to write mainstream records for the radio; rather, she wrote about "everything, about your life and concentrate on you doing you." For previous albums, Milian wrote about things that had happened in the past, whereas for So Amazin', she focused on the present. She compared the writing process to writing a diary; whenever she would experience something that she thought would be important, she would write it down for future reference. Milian felt that by writing down true experiences, her songs were like "captured emotion". When writing songs, Milian said that the amount of time it took to write varied. It would depend on what she was writing about, what was going on in her life, and if it pertained to that exact moment. Sometimes the process was quick, but other times it could take several hours to write an entire song. Although Milian was a songwriter since her teenagers years, she only felt real growth during the production sessions when Dre told her, "there are no rules". Previously, Milian would write songs that followed rules, where she would have a hook, a verse, and another verse with similar sound and melody. For So Amazin, she wrote with a "no rules theory", which was her biggest obstacle while recording the album. She said, "It was just, you know what? I can change up the melody I can do different things. Sometimes I might get stuck but wait half an hour and it'll come to you and end up being hot. So that's probably my biggest obstacle, just stepping away from doing the usual that I know and stepping into something new. Once I got past all that, it was just easy. With flying colors, I started writing all the records."

== Composition ==
"I found a really great chemistry with Cool and Dre. I honestly connected with them and found that I was able to express myself easier and so much better through their music. It definitely gave me the soundtrack to write everything that was going on in my life at that time."
—Milian on her collaboration with Cool & Dre.

Milian described So Amazin' as a "consistent, very real and personal album". A problem Milian had with her previous album, It's About Time, was that it did not flow. The various pop and urban influences in that album confused the audience, and Milian wanted So Amazin' to paint a picture; "you get led down the whole way, you kinda get to see my growth through one album". Wanting a more consistent approach for her new album, Milian collaborated with only one team of producers, which made for a greater representation of a "more mature, settled" Milian. The purpose of the album was to record an album that had more realness, so that female fans could relate to what she was singing about. Milian felt that Cool & Dre brought their own style of beats to the album, giving it a "raw feel" and "street credibility". Marcello "Cool" Valenzano of Cool & Dre said that "we come from an R&B background, and we bringing [sic] something new to the table, a style we think is hot." For So Amazin', Milian knew that she needed to record material that had a "realness". She wanted to make dance tracks, but also wanted to express more of herself at the same time. Milian found the album to be "so much more real and urban and street" than her previous albums.

The single, "Say I", is an inspirational and motivational record; Milian wanted to make a record that would be an inspiration to both her and her fans. Focusing on an urban audience, Milian said the record was "way more an urban record than anything I've ever done." The singer felt it was necessary to have Young Jeezy feature because he spoke for the streets, and thought his rap was "a very real message. It pertained to his life." The track, "Twisted", was one of the first songs recorded for the album. Lyrically, the song is about liking someone so much that you "can't even go about [your] day in a normal way". Milian compared the urban vibe of both tracks and said they were huge records, "where the music is just big and the hook is just big and you can’t help but sing [along]."

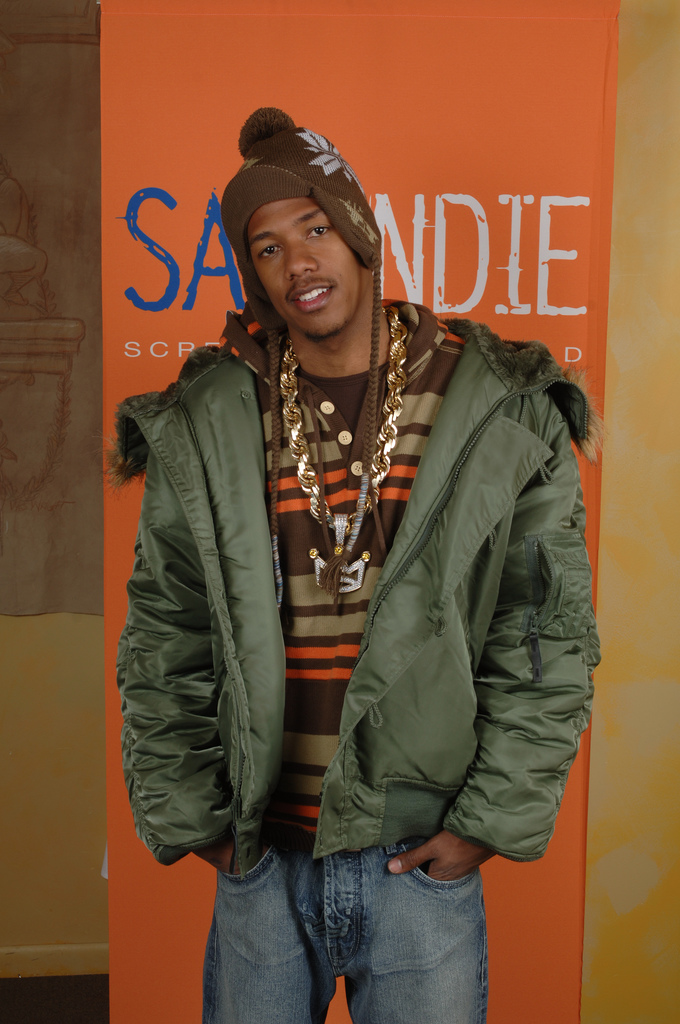
Milian wrote two tracks, "Gonna Tell Everybody" and "Who's Gonna Ride", about her break-up with Nick Cannon.

Dre features on two tracks, "So Amazing" and "Hot Boy", which both have a club vibe. Milian thought "So Amazing" had a similar vibe to several performance records she had done in the past. Milian raps in the track and described it as being "really street and sexy". She also said "Hot Boy" is a "hot one for the streets and for the club and for performance." "Foolin'" was written when Milian heard an old record and sampled the line, "if you're foolin, only foolin". Hearing the original track, Milian knew she needed to write something original, and wrote about an ex-boyfriend, whom she nicknamed "Mr. Big", that was still interested in Milian but had a new girlfriend. The album's final track, "She Don't Know", has a Latin vibe and features a Spanish guitar. Being Cuban, Milian wanted to incorporate a Spanish record on the album, and sings in English and Spanish in the song. Taking inspiration from Latin soap operas, Milian wanted to portray a very "dramatic feel" in the song. Lyrically, the song is about two people falling in love; however, the man has a girlfriend who does not know about the new relationship or that he has moved on.

Milian wrote So Amazin' based on her own life, and each record pertained to a different aspect, especially focused on relationships. During early production of the album, Milian was dealing with her break-up with actor Nick Cannon and wrote several records based on that. While writing the mid-tempo track "My Lovin' Goes", Milian felt she turned a new leaf. She said, "you see the change in So Amazin' where life was just really coming into place. I was finally becoming the woman that I feel that I am right now. Also, I was leaving old love behind and learning about new types of love. Which is great, whether it be life, and also the dating scene is really nice." Two tracks which Milian wrote about Cannon were "Gonna Tell Everybody" and "Who's Gonna Ride". When Milian and Cool & Dre had discussions, her break-up with Cannon was regularly mentioned. Milian felt a need to express herself, and writing became therapeutic for Milian; she was able to get through the break-up by writing songs. The production by Cool & Dre also inspired Milian to write the tracks, as she felt comfortable with them and was able to be open.

Milian wrote the hip-hop ballad "Gonna Tell Everybody" about "thinking that I had something good, what happens when it's over, and going forward with my life." The track was one of the final songs that Milian wrote about the break-up as it "helped me get it all out". While the record is about a break-up, it focuses more on closure and moving past it. Milian and Cool & Dre used the melody of the Bone Thugs-n-Harmony song "Tha Crossroads" and changed the lyrics "and I'm gonna miss everybody" to "and I'm gonna tell everybody". The other song, "Who's Gonna Ride", has a more street and gangster vibe, and contain more raw lyrics. Milian wrote the track with Dre, which she said helped because hip hop artists write about real things in their lives and are not afraid to say anything. While writing the track, Milian let her guard down and wrote what she was feeling and tried to be real. Lyrically, the song also deals with "the girls that come around and try to take your man. Or the groupie girls that are around, paying attention to the guys on TV that only hang out with them for those reasons." Milian also said "Who's Gonna Ride" was the hardest song to write because it was not safe, unlike previous songs she had written. The singer explained writing the lyrics was not hard, but the difficulty came from being real and actually writing about her true feelings. When writing the lyrics, Milian removed several lines that she thought were too harsh.

== Commercial performance ==
So Amazin' debuted and peaked at number 11 on the Billboard 200, selling 54,000 copies in its first week and 163,000 copies in total. Internationally, the album peaked at number 55 on the Swiss Albums Chart, 67 on the UK Albums Chart, and 139 on the France Albums Chart. The album's lead single, "Say I", featured rapper Young Jeezy and had a music video, directed by Ray Kay. The single peaked at number four in the UK, and number 21 in the United States.

In June 2006, Milian's representative confirmed that she had left Island Def Jam. Although she was dropped from the label, Milian continued to promote the album through live appearances, including performing on Power 106's Summer Splash. Milian hoped to take "Gonna Tell Everybody", the proposed second single, to another label and shoot a video, but was not able to. Milian revealed in an interview with Rap-Up that she was dropped two weeks after the release of her album. Milian stated that before the release of So Amazin', the label and L.A. Reid knew that the album would not have immediate large sales, since she was targeting a new urban audience, but promised to support her. However, after two weeks, L.A. Reid called to notify Milian that she had been dropped. The singer believed that it was a budget cut, and the label opted to spend money on Rihanna instead. Milian also dispelled rumors that she was originally offered Rihanna's song "SOS".

== Critical reception ==
Professional ratings
Aggregate scores
Source	Rating
Metacritic	59/100
Review scores
Source	Rating
AllMusic	3/5 stars
Entertainment Weekly	C+
IGN	6.9/10
PopMatters	7/10
Rolling Stone	3/5 stars
Slant Magazine	1.5/5 stars
Spin	(4/10)
Stylus Magazine	C−
USA Today	2.5/4 stars
Yahoo! Music UK	7/10 stars

So Amazin' received mixed reviews from music critics. Metacritic gave the album a Metascore—a weighted average based on the impressions of a select 12 critical reviews—of 59, signifying mixed or average reviews. David Peisner of Maxim gave the album three out of five stars and said that Milian's "talent is real", and commended her "silky and sassy" voice. He praised Cool & Dre's "badass" production, as well as "intoxicating" lead single "Say I". Clover Hope of Billboard wrote that Milian tried to transform from "peppy pop sweetheart" to "sweet urban soulstress", but the album could not "pinpoint her true identity" and could "only [scratch] the surface of who she really is." Hope praised lead single, "Say I", describing it as "instantly rousing".

Dan Gennoe of Yahoo! Music UK said that the production by Cool & Dre ensured for "a cohesive whole, with a clear, unmistakable identity". He praised single "Say I", saying it "shimmies to a feisty ghetto strut and Shaft-sized orchestrals", as well as "Twisted", "Hot Boy" and "Just A Little Bit". He described So Amazin' as "almost the perfect R&B album", only missing "a couple of killer singles". Sal Cinquemani of Slant Magazine wrote that while Milian claimed that she was "proudly displaying the various sides of her multifaceted personality", he felt that "only personality displayed on So Amazin' is that of her contemporaries and predecessors". He felt that contrary to the album's title, "So Amazin' proves to be anything but".

Andy Kellman, of music database AllMusic, felt that So Amazin' was "Milian's strongest album yet, if only by a narrow margin". He said that the album was short on ideas, with Cool & Dre using beats from some of their recent hits. He felt that Milian's weakness was ballads, which were "more like placeholders that merely apply some forced variety to the album"; but described the club tracks as "perfectly functional and appealing". Spence Dookey of IGN gave the album a 6.9 out of 10 and said that "Milian glistens most brightly on the tracks that are the most stripped down, such as 'Gonna Tell Everybody'". He said given the nature of the style of music Milian was practicing, "there's a fair share of rump shaking club jams offsetting the more slow tempo fare". Dookey described single "Say I" as "a poundingly theatrical ditty", and "Foolin'" as one of the "few tracks that genuinely attempts to lift Milian up from the generic R&B/club stylings". The reviewer found the overall sound was the album's biggest flaw; "the production rings with a sense of detached hollowness ... The result is an album severely lacking any of the warmth that usually accompanies R&B. Milian's hauntingly beautiful voice deserves to be wrapped in a sunny glow of organic vibes." Quentin B. Huff of PopMatters praised the album, "despite a few lyrical hiccups, a couple of lackluster hooks, and some obvious influences."

== Track listing ==
So Amazin' track listing
No.	Title	Writer(s)	Producer(s)	Length
1.	"Say I" (featuring Young Jeezy)	Bunny Sigler; Jay Jenkins; Phil Hurtt; Andre Lyon; Marcello Valenzano; Jazmine Sullivan	Cool & Dre	3:33
2.	"Twisted"	Lyon; Sullivan; Valenzano; Leon Ware	Cool & Dre	4:00
3.	"Gonna Tell Everybody"	Anthony Henderson; Steven Howse; Ernie Isley; Marvin Isley; O'Kelly Isley Jr.; Ronald Isley; Lyon; Milian; Eddie Montilla; Valenzano	Cool & Dre	4:20
4.	"Who's Gonna Ride" (featuring Three 6 Mafia)	Paul Beauregard; Albert Bouchard; Jordan Houston; Lyon; Milian; David Roter; Valenzano	Cool & Dre	4:10
5.	"So Amazing" (featuring Dre)	Lyon; Milian; Valenzano	Cool & Dre	3:20
6.	"Hot Boy" (featuring Dre)	Lyon; Milian; Valenzano	Cool & Dre	3:53
7.	"Foolin'"	Lyon; Milian; Pam Sawyer; Valenzano; Ware	Cool & Dre	4:05
8.	"My Lovin' Goes"	Lyon; Milian; Valenzano	Cool & Dre	4:00
9.	"Just a Little Bit"	Vinnie Barrett; Bobby Eli; John Freeman Jr.; Lyon; Milian; Valenzano	Cool & Dre	3:05
10.	"Y'all Ain't Nuthin'"	Milian; Shaffer Smith; Melvin Sparkman	The Heavy Weights	4:18
11.	"She Don't Know"	Jeff Barnell; Bernard Dahan; Lyon; Milian; Valenzano	Cool & Dre	4:35

UK and digital reissue bonus track
No.	Title	Writer(s)	Producer(s)	Length
12.	"Tonight"	Lyon; Milian; Valenzano	Cool & Dre	3:40

Japanese edition
No.	Title	Writer(s)	Producer(s)	Length
11.	"Wind You Up"	Lyon; Milian; Valenzano	Cool & Dre	3:42
12.	"Tonight"	Lyon; Milian; Valenzano	Cool & Dre	3:40
13.	"She Don't Know"	Jeff Barnell; Bernard Dahan; Lyon; Milian; Valenzano	Cool & Dre	4:35

== Personnel ==
- John D.S. Adams – engineer
- Mathu Anderson – make-up
- Carol Corless – package coordinator
- April DeVona – assistant engineer
- Tony Duran – photography
- Thomas "T" Hatcher – bass
- Jean-Marie Horvat – mixing
- Patrick Magee – assistant engineer
- Alan Mason – assistant engineer
- Renson Mateo – engineer
- Kevin Mayer – mixing assistant
- Carmen Milian – management
- Christina Milian – executive producer
- Eddie Montilla – bass, keyboards
- Adrienne Muhammad – A&R
- Gary Noble – engineer
- Herb Powers – mastering
- Derrick "Swol" Ray – bass
- Eric Rennaker – assistant engineer
- Nico Solis – engineer
- Shakir Stewart – A&R
- Randy Stodghill – hair stylist
- Alli Truch – creative director
- Eric Weissman – sample clearance
- Andy West – art direction, design
- James M. Wisner – mixing assistant
- Eric Wong – marketing

== Charts ==
Chart performance for So Amazin'
Chart (2006)	Peak position
Canadian Albums (Nielsen SoundScan)	68
French Albums (SNEP)	139
Japanese Albums (Oricon)	9
Swiss Albums (Schweizer Hitparade)	55
UK Albums (Official Charts)	67
UK R&B Albums (Official Charts)	7
US Billboard 200	11
US Top R&B/Hip-Hop Albums (Billboard)	3
