= Game's Pain =

Single by The Game featuring Keyshia Cole

from the album LAX
- Released: April 29, 2008
- Recorded: 2008
- Genre: G-funk
- Length: 4:26
- Label: Geffen
- Songwriters: J. Taylor; K. Cole; J. Foster; D. Darien; G. Harper
- Producers: Knobody; Dahoud Darien

The Game singles chronology
"A Bay Bay (The Ratchet Remix)" (2007)	"Game's Pain" (2008)	"Dope Boys" (2008)

Keyshia Cole singles chronology
"I've Changed" (2008)	"Game's Pain" (2008)	"Playa Cardz Right" (2008)

Music video
- "Game's Pain" on YouTube

"Game's Pain" is the lead single from The Game's third studio album LAX.

In the song, which features Keyshia Cole, Game makes references to The Notorious B.I.G., Will Smith, DJ Jazzy Jeff & the Fresh Prince, Nas, Luke Skyywalker of 2 Live Crew, Common, LL Cool J, Public Enemy, N.W.A, Ice Cube (who he says is his favorite rapper), Eazy-E, New Edition, Naughty By Nature, Tony! Toni! Toné!, Wu-Tang Clan, Black Rob, DJ Kool Herc, DJ Red Alert, Jay-Z, Big Daddy Kane, and Mary J. Blige, among others.

== Music video ==
The music video for "Game's Pain" was filmed in Los Angeles. The video has cameos including Ice Cube, Tiny Lister, Big Daddy Kane, Three 6 Mafia, Raekwon, Nipsey Hussle and Black Wall Street. It made its debut on BET on May 16.

The video starts with The Game in his apartment tapping on a fish tank (tribute to Rumble Fish movie). He then leaves his residence and hops onto a Bombardier Spyder. He then drives over to Keyshia Cole, who is sitting in a lowrider. He then hops into the lowrider and they begin performing the song.

As the song progresses The Game is shown standing up in the lowrider while Keyshia Cole is driving and later, they are both shown at a mansion in Beverly Hills singing at a party. Game is also shown sitting in a throne-like chair in some parts, getting greeted by Raekwon.

"Game's Pain" became the No. 1 video on BET's 106 & Park on June 12, 2008, and later appeared at No. 67 on the channel's Notarized: Top 100 Videos countdown.

== Remix ==
The official remix featuring Jadakiss, Bun B, Pusha T, Fat Joe, Young Buck, Queen Latifah, and Keyshia Cole was released on June 28, 2008. The remix samples "Juicy Fruit" by Mtume. Keyshia Cole, who appears on the track previously, sampled "Juicy Fruit" for her hit "Let It Go".

== Charts ==
=== Weekly charts ===
Chart (2008)	Peak position
Canada Hot 100 (Billboard)	94
US Billboard Hot 100	75
US Hot R&B/Hip-Hop Songs (Billboard)	20
US Hot Rap Songs (Billboard)	9
US Rhythmic Airplay (Billboard)	17

=== Year-end charts ===
Chart (2008)	Position
US Hot R&B/Hip-Hop Songs (Billboard)	96
