= Dope Boys =

Single by The Game featuring Travis Barker

from the album LAX
- Released: June 24, 2008
- Recorded: 2008
- Genre: Rap rock
- Length: 4:03
- Label: Geffen
- Songwriter: J. Taylor
- Producers: 1500 or Nothin', DJ Quik (add.)

The Game singles chronology
"Game's Pain" (2008)	"Dope Boys" (2008)	"My Life" (2008)

Travis Barker singles chronology
"Dope Boys" (2008)	"Can a Drummer Get Some" (2011)

Music video
- "Dope Boys" on YouTube

"Dope Boys" is the second single from The Game's third studio album, LAX. The song features Travis Barker playing the drums. The song samples "Eleanor Rigby" By The Beatles. The song was slated to appear in the 2008 driving game Midnight Club: Los Angeles but was omitted from the game for unknown reasons.

== Music video ==
The official video was directed and edited by Matt Alonzo and features Travis Barker, Omar Cruz, Black Wall Street, Mr. Capone-E and BYI members. The video is interspersed with shots of The Game standing on a Los Angeles rooftop with the skyline behind him. In other shots he is seen to be wearing Beats by Dr. Dre headphones.

== Covers and remixes ==
The song has been freestyled by rappers Bow Wow, Rick Ross, Wiz Khalifa, and Dynasty of L.$.G. Royce da 5'9" also has a freestyle called Flow Boy on his Bar Exam 2 mixtape. There is also an unofficial remix featuring Trae on his mixtape "Streets Advocate" and Young Buck featured this song (non-album) in April 2010.

== Chart position ==
Chart (2008)	Peak position
U.S. Billboard Bubbling Under R&B/Hip-Hop Singles	11
