= Touchdown (The Game song) =

Song by The Game featuring Raheem DeVaughn

from the album LAX
- Released: 2008
- Recorded: 2008
- Genre: Hip hop, R&B
- Length: 3:59
- Label: Geffen
- Songwriter(s): J. Taylor, R. DeVaughn, L. Dopson, L. Edwards, C. Mayfield
- Producer(s): 1500 or Nothin'

"Touchdown" is a song by the West Coast rapper The Game from his third album LAX. The song features the R&B singer Raheem DeVaughn.

== Composition ==
The song contains a samples of "Right on for the Darkness" by the R&B/funk/soul singer Curtis Mayfield from his 1973 album Back to the World. The song contains a heavy bass line.

== Critical reception ==
The song gathered generally positive reviews from critics. Allmusic writer David Jeffries complimented The Game on his lyrics stating that "when the rapper refers to his woman as "beautiful as an Eli Manning pass," it's just one of the reasons the feel-good "Touchdown" is a highlight."

== Chart performance ==
"Touchdown" debuted at #57 on the Hot R&B/Hip-Hop Songs chart based on digital sales alone, even though it was never released as an official single.

Chart (2008)	Peak position
U.S. Billboard Hot R&B/Hip-Hop Songs	57
