= Camera Phone (song) =

2009 single by The Game featuring Ne-Yo Arwa

Single by The Game featuring Ne-Yo

from the album LAX
- Released: 12 January 2009 (UK)
- Recorded: 2008
- Genre: Hip hop; R&B
- Length: 4:29
- Label: Geffen
- Songwriters: Jayceon Taylor; Shaffer Smith
- Producer: Cool & Dre

The Game singles chronology
"My Life" (2008)	"Camera Phone" (2009)	"Make the World Go Round" (2009)

Ne-Yo singles chronology
"Single" (2008)	"Camera Phone" (2008)	"Mad" (2009)

"Camera Phone" is the fourth single from The Game's third album, LAX. The song features R&B singer Ne-Yo. The song was produced by Cool & Dre. It appears as a bonus track on the deluxe edition of the album only. The single was only released for download in the UK and not the USA. In the UK, "Camera Phone" was the second single taken from LAX. It did not originally feature on the UK edition of the album and was thus re-issued, removing the "Intro" and "Outro" and adding "Camera Phone" as the final track.

== Music video ==
The music video for the song was shot at the Copacabana nightclub in Los Angeles, California on November 4, 2008, and was directed by Kevin Connolly, who was only hired for the video six days before. The setting takes place in a bar, with The Game and Ne-Yo wearing suits and hats in the main performance scene. The video premiered on FNMTV on Friday, December 5, 2008, at 8pm. The video features cameo appearances by Clyde Carson, The Menace, Pleasure P and Cheryl Burke.

The video rose in its first week to the number one spot on the Billboard Hot Videoclip Tracks.

== Charts ==
The song debuted at #48 in the United Kingdom after the physical release. Despite not reaching the Top 20, it received much airplay on UK television.

Weekly chart performance for "Camera Phone"
Chart (2009)	Peak position
Scotland Singles (OCC)	21
UK Hip Hop/R&B (OCC)	15
UK Singles (OCC)	48

== Release history ==
Region	Date	Format(s)	Label	Ref.
United Kingdom	January 12, 2009	CD single	Polydor	
