= So Excited (Fat Joe song) =

Single by Fat Joe featuring Dre
- Released: August 2, 2017
- Length: 3:54
- Label: RNG; Empire
- Songwriters: Joseph Cartagena; Andre Christopher
- Producer: Streetrunner

Fat Joe singles chronology
"Heartbreak" (2017)	"So Excited" (2017)	"Pick It Up" (2018)

"So Excited" is a song by American rapper Fat Joe, released on August 2, 2017. The song was produced by his longtime producer Streetrunner and features Dre from Cool & Dre on the hook.

== Composition ==
"So Excited" samples "Don't Look Any Further" by Dennis Edwards and Siedah Garrett, which was notably sampled on 2Pac's infamous diss record "Hit 'Em Up" and Junior M.A.F.I.A. and The Notorious B.I.G.'s "Gettin' Money (The Get Money Remix)."

== Music video ==
The official music video was released August 11, 2017.

== Charts ==
Chart (2017)	Peak position
US Bubbling Under Hot 100 (Billboard)	20
US Bubbling Under R&B/Hip-Hop Singles (Billboard)	5
US Rhythmic Airplay (Billboard)	21
