= LAX (album) =

Studio album by the Game
- Released: August 26, 2008
- Recorded: 2007–2008
- Genres: West Coast hip-hop; gangsta rap; hardcore hip-hop
- Length: 76:28
- Label: Geffen
- Producers: The Game (exec.); Rodney "Kinji" Harris (also exec.); Jimmy Rosemond (also exec.); Angelo Sanders (co-exec.); Ervin Pope (also co-exec.); 1500 or Nothin'; Cool & Dre; Dahoud Darien; Danja; DJ Quik; DJ Toomp; Hi-Tek; Irv Gotti; J. R. Rotem; J.U.S.T.I.C.E. League; JellyRoll; Jim Jonsin; Kane Beatz; Kanye West; Knobody; Nasty Beatmakers; Nottz; Polow da Don; Scott Storch; Tha Bizness; The Runners; Timbaland; Trackmasters; Tre Beatz

The Game chronology
Doctor's Advocate (2006)	LAX (2008)	The R.E.D. Album (2011)

Alternative cover
- Alternative cover

Alternative cover
- Alternate cover

Singles from LAX
- 1. "Game's Pain" Released: April 29, 2008; 2. "Dope Boys" Released: June 24, 2008; 3. "My Life" Released: August 5, 2008; 4. "Camera Phone" Released: January 12, 2009 (UK)

LAX is the third studio album by American rapper the Game. It was released on August 26, 2008, by Geffen Records. Recording sessions took place from 2007 to 2008, with the production that were contributed by the Runners, Kane Beatz, Cool & Dre, Kanye West, Tha Bizness, Scott Storch, Polow da Don, Nottz, J.U.S.T.I.C.E. League, Hi-Tek, J. R. Rotem and JellyRoll; as well as guest appearances from DMX, Chrisette Michele, Common, Ice Cube, Keyshia Cole, Ludacris, Nas, Ne-Yo, Raekwon, Raheem DeVaughn, Travis Barker, Bilal and Lil Wayne. The album was supported by four singles: "Game's Pain" (featuring Keyshia Cole), "Dope Boys" (featuring Travis Barker), "My Life" (featuring Lil Wayne), and "Camera Phone" (featuring Ne-Yo). The album was released with two different cases such as one cover art for the deluxe version with Game looking at the camera with his bandanna in his hand, and the cover art for another was with him sitting on a couch smoking a blunt.

LAX debuted at number 2 on the United States Billboard 200, selling 238,000 copies in its first week, behind metal band Slipknot's All Hope Is Gone. Initially, Billboard magazine published an article stating that the Game had secured the top spot by a margin of 13 copies, in what was described as the "closest race for number one since SoundScan began tracking data in 1991". However, Slipknot's record labels Warner Music Group and Roadrunner Records requested Nielsen SoundScan to recount the album sale totals for the week. The recount placed LAX at #2, with final 1st week sales of 238,382 copies in the United States, and awarded Slipknot's All Hope Is Gone the top spot, with first week sales of 239,516 copies, a margin of 1,134 copies in the United States of America.

Upon its release, LAX received generally favorable reviews from most music critics, with music critics praising the album's production.

== Background ==
After signing a deal to Interscope Records and Dr. Dre's Aftermath Entertainment label, Interscope Records' head COO Jimmy Iovine convinced 50 Cent to take Game under his wing in an effort to guarantee record sales. In 2005 the Game released his debut album The Documentary, but then left G-Unit following beef with 50 Cent. In 2006 he released his follow-up album Doctor's Advocate. On December 31, 2007, at Nas' New Year's Eve party, the Game announced the title and release date for LAX.

== Recording ==
On May 11, 2007, the Game was arrested at his home reportedly in connection with an incident that happened at a basketball game in South Los Angeles back in February 2007. He was alleged to threatened a person with a gun. The arrest took place after his home was searched for three hours. The Game was released early the next day after posting $50,000 bail. On January 9, 2008, a Los Angeles judge scheduled February 4, as the beginning date for the Game's trial on assault and weapons charges. After pleading no contest to a felony weapons charge on February 11, the Game was sentenced to 60 days in jail, 150 hours of community service, and three years of probation. In March 2008, it was reported that the Game had been released from jail. His manager later stated that he has not yet been what you expected to be released in time to promote the album. He was released after serving eight days, and went back in a studio and begin working with the production duo Cool & Dre. Dre from Cool & Dre stated that the Game was like 'Pac, and that lyrically, he was "[somewhere] else right now". On July 28, 2008, the Game told J. Hyphen and J. Moore of Sunday Night Sound Sessions, that the album has been finished, and that the official release date was August 26, 2008. He said that the album would include 16 tracks, and that he would've leaked the clean version for an album two weeks before the official release. The Game mentioned that he recorded over 220 tracks for the album. In these recording sessions, artists would participate for LAX, at first Nu Jerzey Devil stated that Lil Wayne would be making his guest appearance on the album. It was later confirmed that Akon, André 3000, Busta Rhymes, Chris Brown, Chrisette Michele, Common, Ice Cube, Keyshia Cole, DMX, Ludacris, Snoop Dogg, Marsha Ambrosius, Mary J. Blige, Nas, Ne-Yo, Raekwon, Raheem DeVaughn, Fabolous, and Robin Thicke would be making appearances, however, not all of them made the final cut. Although Travis Barker, Bilal, Keyshia Cole, Common, Raheem DeVaughn, DMX, Ice Cube, Lil Wayne, Ludacris, Chrisette Michele, Nas, Ne-Yo, Raekwon, and LaToiya Williams were in the final album track listing.

The record producers credited on the album include JellyRoll, Nottz, DJ Toomp, J.R. Rotem, Scott Storch, Kanye West, 1500 or Nothin', Travis Barker, DJ Quik, Knobody, Dahoud Darien, Hi-Tek, Ervin Pope, Cool & Dre, Irv Gotti, Tre Beatz, and Trackmasters. The Game had announced that Dr. Dre would be producing for the album, but neither Dr. Dre nor Aftermath Entertainment had confirmed their involvement. Nu Jerzey Devil later confirmed that Dr. Dre would be serving as a producer on the album. On May 1, 2008, the Game told Power 106 that he had worked with Just Blaze, Kanye West, Cool & Dre, Scott Storch, Timbaland, Knobody, Ervin Pope, JellyRoll and Tre Beatz, among others. At a listening party on June 23, 2008, it was mentioned that the production duo Trackmasters would be included for the album.

== Release and promotion ==
The album was pushed back to June 24, in competition for G-Unit's second album, however, it was later changed to July 8, as Interscope Records moved both of these albums. On June 8, 2008, it was announced that LAX has been pushed back for week to July 15, which happens to be the same release date as Nas' Untitled album. LAX has been pushed back for another week to July 22, and finally to August 26. On May 1, 2008, the Game told Power 106 that "Big Dreams" might not be on the album. On August 6, 2008, iTunes revealed some information on the album. It confirmed that DJ Toomp has produced a track, called "House of Pain" that would be released as the fourth single from the album. It also revealed that the standard edition would have 14 tracks with one bonus track, and the "deluxe edition" would have 18 tracks and one additional bonus track. On August 10, 2008, the Game told Friday Night Flavas, that he would be dropping two mixtapes; "Superman", featuring all original tracks, which did not appear on the album, in a week and a half and "You Know What It Is Vol. 5" after the album. He also blamed DJ Haze for the leak of the Just Blaze-produced title track "Superman".

=== Promo singles ===
The first street single was released on March 18, 2008 "Big Dreams" which is produced by Cool & Dre. The Game commented on Power 106 that the song would not be released on any specific album, including the upcoming LAX. However, a modified version of the song, with different lyrics in the third verse, was later included on the bonus disc of the "Deluxe Version" of the album. Dre, from the production duo Cool & Dre commented that "'Big Dreams' is one of the most amazing records that I can honestly say that me and Cool have been a part of". Dre continued by stating "'Big Dreams' is a phenomenal record. It's very inspirational, It's gonna be big in the streets, but it's gonna be big all across the board. I feel like 'Hate It or Love It' was such an inspirational record that a lot of people didn't see coming. And this has the same feel as far as how it makes you feel, but it's gonna inspire the shit outta everybody. It's one of those records — his performance, his delivery, he's lyrically on a level that I can't even compare anyone to. He stepped it up to a notch that's amazing. He definitely has a new passion. And the fucking record is gonna really, really destroy."

The second street single was "House of Pain" and it was released on August 19, 2008. The single is produced by DJ Toomp. The song "Touchdown" also debuted on the Hot 100 without being released as a single, it charted at number 57 on the Hot R&B/Hip-Hop Songs chart.

=== Singles ===
The first official single "Game's Pain" featuring Keyshia Cole was released on April 29, 2008. It charted moderately in the US but was met with critical acclaim "Game's Pain, Keyshia Cole sums up in one sentence what Game has been trying to say the whole album; "I just wanna let you know/ I'm paying homage 'cause you've paved the way for me." Game underscores the central themes of hip-hop's history and his deserved place in it, meditating on the struggles he's faced." The second single was "Dope Boys" featuring Blink-182 drummer Travis Barker, the video released was deemed to be too edgy to be aired on TV by BET, but it has been lauded critically as "not only one of the best collaborations on L.A.X. but also one of the best songs of Game's career." The third single released was "My Life" featuring Lil Wayne, when the song first leaked, many believed the Game was "dissing" Eminem. However, later on his website, Game denied this, and apologized to anyone who might have misunderstood what he had intended to say. It charted well in the US reaching a peak of 21 in Billboard Hot 100 and it peaked at 4 for Hot Rap Tracks. The fourth and final single was released featuring Ne-Yo called "Camera Phone" on January 12, 2009, it was only released in the UK.

=== Tour ===
On May 21, 2009, the Game announced upcoming tour dates for performances in the United Kingdom for the summer of 2009. The Game assembled a coast-to-coast US trek to support LAX. The club/theater outing was scheduled to visit nearly 30 cities, starting with several California performances in mid-February 2009.

The tour began on February 18, 2009, and concluded March 29, 2009. Stops included Los Angeles, California, Phoenix, Arizona, Sacramento, California, Portland, Oregon, Seattle, Washington, Boise, Idaho, Denver, Colorado, Tulsa, Oklahoma, Dallas, Texas, Houston, Texas, New Orleans, Louisiana, New Haven, Connecticut, Providence, Rhode Island, Norfolk, Virginia, New York City, New York and more. The following year Game went on the European Club Tour 2010.

== Commercial performance ==
The album received favorable reviews from critics, debuted at number 2 on the US Billboard 200, with approximately 239,000 copies sold, just behind metal band Slipknot's All Hope Is Gone. The album charted at number one on the Top R&B/Hip-Hop Albums, and at #1 on the Top Rap Albums charts. At first it looked like LAX had debuted ahead of All Hope Is Gone by 13 copies, with such a close difference, Slipknot's labels Warner Music Group and Roadrunner Records asked for a SoundScan recount, a historic first. Nielsen proceeded to the recount, which made no changes, and Slipknot in 2nd position with 239,516 copies scanned. Initially, Billboard published an article stating that the Game had secured the top spot with a margin of 13 units, in what was described as the "closest race for number one since SoundScan began tracking Data in 1991". having sold 239,516 units.

LAX attained respectable international charting. In Australia, the album entered the Australian Albums Chart at number 12, in Austria, the album entered the Austrian Albums Chart at number 29, in Belgium, the album entered the Belgian Albums Chart at number 22, in Canada, the album entered the Canadian Albums Chart at number 2, in Denmark, the album entered the Danish Album Chart at number 18, in the Netherlands, the album entered the Dutch Albums Chart at number 21, in Europe, the album entered the European Top 100 Albums at number 14, in France, the album entered the French Albums Chart at number 19, in Germany, the album entered the German Albums Chart at number 33, in the Republic of Ireland, the album entered the Irish Albums Chart at number 8, in Italy, the album entered the Italian Albums Chart at number 2, in New Zealand, the album entered the New Zealand Albums Chart at number 11, in Norway, the album entered the Norwegian Albums Chart at number 18, in Sweden, the album entered the Swedish Albums at number 3, in Switzerland, the album entered the Swiss Albums Chart at number 8, and in the United Kingdom, the album entered the UK Albums Chart at number 9, and at number one on the UK R&B Chart.

== Critical response ==
Professional ratings
Aggregate scores
Source	Rating
Metacritic	65/100
Review scores
Source	Rating
Allmusic	3.5/5 stars
The Boston Globe	mixed
Entertainment Weekly	B
The Guardian	3/5 stars
Los Angeles Times	3/4 stars
The New York Times	mixed
Pitchfork Media	(6.4/10.0)
PopMatters	(7/10)
USA Today	4/4 stars
The Village Voice	mixed

Upon its release, LAX received mostly favorable reviews from music critics. At Metacritic, which assigns a normalized rating out of 100 to reviews from mainstream critics, the album received an average score of 65, based on 20 reviews, which indicates "Generally favorable reviews". About.com praised songs like Let Us Live as "Game puts on his best Nas impersonation as he flows off the beat with intricate and polysyllabic rhymes." Allmusic writer David Jeffries noted "the cuts that truly matter on LAX aren't the ones where the rapper's hardcore, unswayable definition of loyalty comes into play but the ones that go outside the usual topics and explore both the profound (the African-American struggle) and, more surprisingly, the profane (rump shaking)" and that "this scattershot album is easy to recommend despite its flaws". USA Today gave the album a perfect score saying "throughout, The Game flays rivals and trumpets his own skills and success. He attacks the beats — provided by the likes of J.R. Rotem, Kanye West, Cool & Dre, Scott Storch, Hi-Tek and DJ Toomp — with lyrical ferocity." The A.V. Club noted "Only three major-label albums into his career, The Game has already appropriated the angst of rap's most beloved icons" and praised the album's production while stating "The Game has always borrowed from the greats. Here, he cannibalizes his own tired shtick so extensively, he lapses even further into self-parody."

The New York Times, which previously said Doctor's Advocate was the best hip-hop album of 2006, gave a mixed review saying that "Worse, the Game, never a fluid rapper, sounds positively lumpy, as if he were delivering verses while running up a steep flight of stairs, or as if the last few years of pugnacity have finally left him winded." Entertainment Weekly noted "As on his first two efforts, he spends L.A.X. barking gleefully ignorant gangsta fantasies over hard-knocking drums. And while the 19-track disc could use a good trimming, The Game's routine is just as entertaining the third time around." The Guardian's Angus Batey stated "LAX is an intense and remarkably focused record - almost every syllable concerns Compton, gangsta rap and (as one song title has it)." Pitchfork Media stated that "Relatively, he's won Round 3 by making his third straight album that's better than it has any right to be-- but the fact that the Game can make perfectly uncompelling competence sound like victory is proof that he's a master thespian of hip-hop theater." Jordan Sargent of PopMatters complimented the Game stating that "On LAX, Game hasn't changed, but he's picked a group of beats that get him closer to extricating himself from both his West Coast Messiah complex and the post-G-Unit narrative. And while Game has yet to carve out his own identity as a rap artist, LAX shows that, on his third album, he might be on the right track."

The Village Voice commented that "Taylor's best assets remain his compellingly ruined wheeze of a voice, relentless delivery, and uncanny ear for beats" and that "Somehow, the Game is still coasting on wispy, West Coast–nostalgia fumes—chronic, red rags, lolos, etc.—but the goodwill, at this point, has pretty much exhausted itself." Sputnikmusic's Tyler Munro noted it as a "Solid hip-hop, but excessive to a fault. Too many guests, too many shifts in style and theme." Slant Magazine's Wilson McBee viewed it as the Game's best album stating "With the Game's third and best album, LAX, which drops without the baggage of a high-profile beef, we learn more about who the rapper really is: a guy who loves hip-hop, from top to bottom, and is as comfortable giving shout-outs to Will Smith and Uncle Luke as he is to Wu-Tang and N.W.A" and "Listening to LAX is like witnessing the creation of a mural of hip-hop's history in which the artist paints himself hiding among the famous faces."

Despite favorable reviews by critics and audiences, Game was critical about the album. In the first song on Game’s highly anticipated fourth studio album, R.E.D., The City, he said: "Came with LAX, since critics said it was average/ I was stressed the fuck out, torn between Aftermath and Geffen, Interscope". He gives a similar statement about LAX in retrospect: "L.A.X., I was kind of lost, but my fans were pleased." said the rapper. He added: "If I had a choice, I would say fuck L.A.X. and The R.E.D. Album because I was kind of lost in trying to re-find the love for hip-hop." He also doesn't feel the album was perfect by his standards compared to his previous album.

== Track listing ==
No.	Title	Writer(s)	Producer(s)	Length
1.	"Intro" (performed by DMX)	Earl Simmons; Ervin Pope	Pope	1:20
2.	"LAX Files"	Jayceon Taylor; Jonathan Rotem; Samuel Christian	J.R. Rotem	3:59
3.	"State of Emergency" (featuring Ice Cube)	Taylor; O'Shea Jackson, Sr.; Rotem	J.R. Rotem	3:38
4.	"Bulletproof Diaries" (featuring Raekwon)	Taylor; Corey Woods; David "Jelly Roll" Drew	Jelly Roll	4:52
5.	"My Life" (featuring Lil Wayne)	Taylor; Dwayne Carter, Jr.; Andre Lyon; Marcello Valenzano; Eddie Montilla; Bryan Williams; David Delgado; Chaz Mishan	Cool & Dre	5:20
6.	"Money"	Taylor; Lyon; Valenzano; Montilla	Cool & Dre	5:13
7.	"Cali Sunshine" (featuring Bilal)	Taylor; Bilal Oliver; Dominick Lamb; Ronald Banks; Edward Green	Nottz	4:33
8.	"Ya Heard" (featuring Ludacris)	Taylor; Christopher Bridges; Lamb; Maurice Cenac	Nottz	4:04
9.	"Hard Liquor (Interlude)"	Taylor; Pope; D. Davis	Pope	1:50
10.	"House of Pain"	Taylor; Aldrin Davis	DJ Toomp	4:32
11.	"Gentleman's Affair" (featuring Ne-Yo)	Taylor; Shaffer Smith; Rotem	J.R. Rotem	3:39
12.	"Let Us Live" (featuring Chrisette Michele)	Taylor; Chrisette Payne; Scott Storch	Storch	4:39
13.	"Touchdown" (featuring Raheem DeVaughn)	Taylor; Raheem DeVaughn; Lamar Edwards; Larrance Dopson; Curtis Mayfield	1500 or Nothin'	3:59
14.	"Angel" (featuring Common)	Taylor; Lonnie Lynn; Kanye West; Gil Scott-Heron	West	4:28
15.	"Never Can Say Goodbye" (featuring LaToiya Williams)	Taylor; LaToiya Williams; Pope; Ronald Isley; Chris Jasper; Rudolph Isley; Marvin Isley; Christopher Wallace	Pope	4:40
16.	"Dope Boys" (featuring Travis Barker)	Taylor; Travis Barker; Dopson; Edwards	1500 or Nothin'; DJ Quik (add.)	4:00
17.	"Game's Pain" (featuring Keyshia Cole)	Taylor; Keyshia Cole; Jerome Foster; Dahoud Darien; Pope; Grenique Harper	Knobody; Darien; Pope	4:21
18.	"Letter to the King" (featuring Nas)	Taylor; Nasir Jones; Tony Cottrell; Jimmie Ross; Dominic Lerace; Benny Faiella	Hi-Tek	5:45
19.	"Outro" (performed by DMX)	Simmons; Pope	Pope	1:28

iTunes bonus tracks
No.	Title	Producer(s)	Length
20.	"Ain't Fuckin' With You"	Trackmasters	3:37

Deluxe edition (bonus tracks)
No.	Title	Producer(s)	Length
1.	"Big Dreams"	Cool & Dre	4:49
2.	"Camera Phone" (featuring Ne-Yo)	Cool & Dre	4:29
3.	"Nice" (featuring Newz)	Irv Gotti	4:40
4.	"Spanglish" (featuring Hyna)	Tre Beatz	4:14

United Kingdom reissue (2008)
No.	Title	Producer(s)	Length
1.	"LAX Files"	J.R. Rotem	3:59
2.	"State of Emergency" (featuring Ice Cube)	J.R. Rotem	3:38
3.	"Bulletproof Diaries" (featuring Raekwon)	Jelly Roll	4:52
4.	"My Life" (featuring Lil Wayne)	Cool & Dre	5:20
5.	"Money"	Cool & Dre	5:13
6.	"Cali Sunshine" (featuring Bilal)	Nottz	4:33
7.	"Ya Heard" (featuring Ludacris)	Nottz	4:04
8.	"Hard Liquor (Interlude)"	Ervin "EP" Pope	1:50
9.	"House of Pain"	DJ Toomp	4:32
10.	"Gentleman's Affair" (featuring Ne-Yo)	J.R. Rotem	3:39
11.	"Let Us Live" (featuring Chrisette Michele)	Scott Storch	4:39
12.	"Touchdown" (featuring Raheem DeVaughn)	1500 or Nothin'	3:59
13.	"Angel" (featuring Common)	Kanye West	4:28
14.	"Never Can Say Goodbye" (featuring LaToiya Williams)	Ervin "EP" Pope	4:40
15.	"Dope Boys" (featuring Travis Barker)	1500 or Nothin', DJ Quik (add.)	4:00
16.	"Game's Pain" (featuring Keyshia Cole)	Knobody, Dahoud Darien, Ervin "EP" Pope	4:21
17.	"Letter to the King" (featuring Nas)	Hi-Tek	5:45
18.	"Camera Phone" (featuring Ne-Yo)	Cool & Dre	4:29

Sample credits

- "My Life" samples of "So Tired" performed by Birdman and Lil Wayne, and "Phone Home" performed by Lil Wayne. The track also contains the inclusion of the re-sung of an elements of "My Life" performed by JJ.
- "Money" contains a sample of She Works Hard for the Money performed by Donna Summer.
- "Cali Sunshine" contains a sample of "California Sunshine" performed by the Dramatics.
- "Ya Heard" contains a sample of "Jam on It" performed by Newcleus.
- "House of Pain" contains a sample of "Real Niggaz Don't Die" performed by N.W.A.
- "Touchdown" contains a sample of "Right on for the Darkness" performed by Curtis Mayfield.
- "Angel" contains a sample of "Angel Dust" performed by Gil Scott-Heron and Brian Jackson.
- "Dope Boys" contains a sample of Eleanor Rigby performed by the Beatles.
- "Game's Pain" contains a sample of C.R.E.A.M. performed by Wu-Tang Clan.
- "Letter to the King" contains a sample of "Memoirs of the Traveler" performed by the Jaggerz.

== Personnel ==
Credits for LAX adapted from Allmusic.

- Travis Barker - Guest Appearance
- Chrisette Michele - Guest Appearance
- Chris Clancy - Marketing
- Keyshia Cole - Guest Appearance
- Dahoud - Producer
- Raheem DeVaughn - Guest Appearance
- Justin Dreyfuss - Marketing Coordinator
- Andrew Flad - Marketing
- Gary Fly - Engineer
- John Frye - Mixing
- E. Anthony Green - Composer
- Bernie Grundman - Mastering
- Shawn "Tubby" Holiday - A&R
- Glenn S. Jeffrey - Guitar
- Lil Wayne - Guest Appearance
- Jay Mac - Keyboards
- Jeff Mann - Promotions Director
- Jonathan Mannion - Photography
- Manny Marroquin - Mixing
- Greg Miller - Publicity
- Ne-Yo - Guest Appearance
- Greg Ogan - Engineer
- Christian Plata - Assistant
- Ervin Pope - Producer
- Will Ragland - Package Design
- Jimmy "Henchmen" Rosemond - Executive Producer, Management
- J.R. Rotem - Arranger, Instrumentation, Mixing, Producer
- Angelo Sanders - A&R, Executive Producer
- Derrick Selby - Engineer
- Andrew Van Meter - Producer
- Kanye West - Producer
- Tre Beatz - Producer
- LaToiya Williams - Guest Appearance
- Shorty (Da Lench Mob) - Guest Appearance
- Betty Wright - Vocals
- Ianthe Zevos - Creative Assistance
- "Luscious" Liz Hernandez - Guest Appearance (Weather Girl in Cali Sunshine)

- DMX - Guest Appearance
- Geoff Gibbs - Engineer All Tracks

== Charts ==
=== Weekly charts ===
Chart (2008)	Peak position
Australian Albums (ARIA)	12
Austrian Albums (Ö3 Austria)	29
Belgian Albums (Ultratop Flanders)	22
Belgian Albums (Ultratop Wallonia)	51
Canadian Albums (Billboard)	2
Danish Albums (Hitlisten)	18
Dutch Albums (Album Top 100)	21
French Albums (SNEP)	19
German Albums (Offizielle Top 100)	33
Irish Albums (IRMA)	8
Italian Albums (FIMI)	69
New Zealand Albums (RMNZ)	11
Norwegian Albums (VG-lista)	18
Scottish Albums (Official Charts)	16
Swedish Albums (Sverigetopplistan)	51
Swiss Albums (Schweizer Hitparade)	8
UK Albums (Official Charts)	9
UK R&B Albums (Official Charts)	1
US Billboard 200	2
US Top R&B/Hip-Hop Albums (Billboard)	1
US Top Rap Albums (Billboard)	1

=== Year-end charts ===
Chart (2008)	Position
US Billboard 200	70
US Top R&B/Hip-Hop Albums (Billboard)	20

Chart (2009)	Position
US Top R&B/Hip-Hop Albums (Billboard)	79

== Certifications ==
Region	Certification	Certified units/sales
United Kingdom (BPI)	Silver	60,000^{^}
^{^} Shipments figures based on certification alone.
