= My Life (The Game song) =

Single by The Game featuring Lil Wayne

from the album LAX
- Released: July 22, 2008 (U.S.); August 5, 2008 (iTunes)
- Recorded: 2008
- Genre: Hip hop; conscious hip hop
- Length: 5:20 (album version); 4:35 (extended radio edit); 3:38 (main radio edit)
- Label: Geffen
- Songwriters: Jayceon Taylor; Dwayne Carter, Jr. Chaz Mishan
- Producer: Cool & Dre

The Game singles chronology
| "Dope Boys" (2008) | "My Life" (2008) | "Camera Phone" (2008) |

Lil Wayne singles chronology
| "Haterz" (2008) | "My Life" (2008) | "Can't Believe It" (2008) |

"My Life" is the third single from The Game's third studio album, LAX which was released on July 22, 2008. The song, produced by Cool & Dre, features Lil Wayne.

== Background ==
=== Recording ===
Producers Cool & Dre have released a video documenting how they created the beat.

The Game spoke on his working with Lil Wayne stating:

When you're in the studio with Wayne, you could pretty much chill, man, because everything is so easy. He's so melody-driven. Once he hits you with an idea, or I come up with an idea, we're straightforward, man. The process is easy. I think me and him could do an album probably in, like, seven days. A classic album! He keeps it 100, I keep it 100. We're both talented MCs. I appreciate him in hip-hop.

=== Samples ===
Lil Wayne re-sings sections of "So Tired", a song by Birdman in which Wayne is featured. Game tried to make this song have the same instruments of Eminem's song "Stan" of the album Marshall Mathers LP (2000). Also at the beginning of the second verse, The Game samples a twice used Lil Wayne line from the remix of "Party Like a Rockstar", and "Phone Home", from Tha Carter III (2008):

We are not the same, I am a Martian

Although multiple samples were used for the song, the album credits only list the sample of "So Tired".

=== Release ===
The song started to receive airplay on July 22, 2008, but was leaked in early July. As of early August 2008 the song was released for download on iTunes.

== Music video ==
The video which was filmed on July 23, 2008, was directed by Bryan Barber, and premiered on FNMTV on August 15, 2008. The setting takes place mostly within a graveyard and other areas in and around Compton and features Lil Wayne, with appearances by Xzibit, Birdman, Cool & Dre, and Young Buck, with references to the deceased Sean Bell. The video also makes references to the gang the Bloods Also in the video is a reference to the "Beats by Dr. Dre" headphones made by Monster. The video has over 200 Million views on The Game's YouTube channel. In the video The Game also wears a shirt that reads "Hip Hop Broke My Heart", which, in an interview with website HipHopDX.com, he stated, among other things,

[When] Hip Hop evolved and changed and got thrown in a bucket of Kool-Aid, somebody threw too much sugar in it. Now it tastes a little funny. That's why I say Hip Hop broke my heart.

=== Build up ===
In addition to the controversy surrounding the supposed "diss" to Eminem and deceased rapper Proof, on August 1, 2008, DJ Skee released a behind-the-scenes video on his official "SkeeTV" YouTube account. The video has many people speaking to the camera including director Bryan Barber speaking on different subjects within the video. Young Buck is seen speaking about his label, Cashville Records, and artists signed to the label such as the Outlawz, and C-Bo. Also on "SkeeTV", a trailer was released to promote the video, on August 14, the day before the video was officially released.

== Chart positions ==
"My Life" was released was first released on iTunes in North America for digital downloads. In the United States, it debuted at #21 on the Billboard Hot 100 making it The Game's highest debut on the chart. It also debuted at #32 on the Pop 100 which was also based on downloads. In Canada it debuted #42 on the Canadian Hot 100 chart the same week also based on downloads as well. On the British Singles Chart it peaked at #34.

== Cover versions ==
This song was covered by the Swedish band jj on their 2010 album jj no. 3. There's a remix with French rapper La Fouine singing Lil Wayne's bits. Lupe Fiasco's Audubon Ballroom features a slightly uptempo sample of My Life.

== Charts ==
=== Weekly charts ===
| Chart (2008–09) | Peak position |
|---|---|
| Canada Hot 100 (Billboard) | 42 |
| Ireland (IRMA) | 36 |
| Switzerland (Schweizer Hitparade) | 49 |
| UK Singles (Official Charts) | 34 |
| UK Hip Hop/R&B (Official Charts) | 1 |
| US Billboard Hot 100 | 21 |
| US Hot R&B/Hip-Hop Songs (Billboard) | 15 |
| US Hot Rap Songs (Billboard) | 4 |

=== Year-end charts ===
| Chart (2008) | Position |
|---|---|
| US Billboard Hot 100 | 88 |
| US Hot R&B/Hip-Hop Songs (Billboard) | 86 |

== Controversy ==
When "My Life" was first leaked, many believed The Game was insulting Eminem. However, later on his website, Game denied these allegations, and apologized to anyone who might have misinterpreted what he had intended to say:

When I originally wrote the song "My Life" I was trying to think back on events that affected my life and how they changed me. When I first got signed to Aftermath and G-Unit I was exposed to so many different people from Dre to Em to 50 to Proof. I always identified with Proof. We were always cool and he would reach out to me when ever I was going through something. I remember when Proof died vividly and now every time I think about going to Detroit I get depressed. That is what I was trying to say in that verse and the more I looked at I realized that people would take it the wrong way…the way they are taking it now that it leaked. So I decided to change it so that this bullshit wouldn’t happen and now it’s happened anyway. For the record, this is not the version on my album, this is not the version that radio will get and this is not the version that I just shot the video to. Furthermore, I apologize to anyone who took this the wrong way as that was never my intention.

The exact lines which many understood as a diss were:

You see them 24's spinning? I earned 'em
And all the pictures of me and Em, I burned 'em
So there ain't no proof that I ever walked through 8 Mile
And since there ain't no Proof, I'll never walk through 8 Mile

On the version used in the music video, the lyrics have been changed to:

You see them 24's spinnin'? I earned 'em
And I ain't no preacher, but here's my Erick Sermon
So eat this black music, and tell me how it taste, now
And fuck Jesse Jackson cause it ain't about race, now
