= Cool & Dre =

American record producers

- Also known as: Record Room Cool & Dre
- Origin: Miami, Florida, U.S.
- Genres: Hip hop; R&B
- Years active: 2001–present
- Labels: Epidemic; Cash Money
- Members: Marcello "Cool" Antonio Valenzano; André "Dre" Christopher Lyon

Cool & Dre are a record production and songwriting duo from Miami Florida, consisting of Marcello "Cool" Antonio Valenzano and André "Dre" Christopher Lyon. The duo were first discovered by New York rapper Fat Joe and began their careers working in tandem to produce his albums Jealous Ones Still Envy (2001) and Loyalty (2002). Two years later, they produced the hit song "New York" by Ja Rule, and "Hate It or Love It" by the Game the following year, which peaked at numbers 27 and two on the Billboard Hot 100, respectively. Cool & Dre were later credited on the Billboard 200 number-one albums Tha Carter III (2008), Tha Carter IV (2011), and Tha Carter V (2018) by Lil Wayne, as well as the collaborative album, Everything Is Love (2018) by Jay-Z and Beyoncé, which won a Grammy Award.

== History ==
The duo have also worked extensively with rappers the Game, Nas, Queen Latifah, Ja Rule, Rick Ross, Remy Ma, and Kendrick Lamar, among others. Their credits include the former and 50 Cent's Grammy-nominated 2005 single, "Hate It or Love It", Juvenile's "Rodeo", Ja Rule's "New York", Fat Joe's Grammy-nominated 2016 hit, “All the Way Up", and Lil Wayne's "On Fire".

To date, their productions have sold over 75 million records worldwide.

== Epidemic Records ==
Cool & Dre launched the record label Epidemic in 2004. Its first two artists, Don Trip and K-Rose, were both signed in early 2011. The label has signed Florida rapper Kent Jones, in a joint venture with DJ Khaled's We the Best Music Group and Epic Records, in 2015. Jones' first mixtape, Tours, spawned the 2016 single "Don't Mind" which peaked at number eight on the Billboard Hot 100 and sold over two million units. Thereafter, they signed other Florida-based rappers Eric Leon (from Vero Beach) and Tom G (from Tampa).

=== Artists ===
- Dre
- Kent Jones
- Tom G
- Eric Leon

== Production discography ==
=== Singles produced ===
List of singles as either producer or co-producer, with selected chart positions and certifications, showing year released, performing artists and album name
Title	Year	Peak chart positions										Certifications	Album
Title	Year	US	US R&B	US Rap	AUS	CAN	GER	IRL	NZ	SWI	UK	Certifications	Album
"Big Bank" (Cognito)	2002	—	—	—	—	—	—	—	—	—	—		Tru Cognizance
"New York" (Ja Rule featuring Fat Joe and Jadakiss)	2004	27	14	10	—	—	—	—	—	—	—		R.U.L.E.
"So Much More" (Fat Joe)	2005	81	34	18	—	—	—	—	—	—	—		All or Nothing
"Hate It or Love It" (The Game featuring 50 Cent)	2005	2	1	1	21	—	14	5	3	12	4	RIAA: Gold	The Documentary
"Holla at Me" (DJ Khaled featuring Lil Wayne, Paul Wall, Fat Joe, Rick Ross and Pitbull)	2006	59	24	15	—	—	—	—	—	—	—		Listennn... the Album
"Rodeo" (Juvenile)	2006	41	12	7	—	—	—	—	—	—	—	RIAA: Gold	Reality Check
"Chevy Ridin' High" (Dre featuring Rick Ross)	2006	—	—	—	—	—	—	—	—	—	—		—N/a
"Say I" (Christina Milian featuring Young Jeezy)	2006	21	13	—	45	—	38	15	23	23	4		So Amazin'
"100 Million" (Birdman featuring Young Jeezy, Rick Ross, and Lil Wayne)	2007	118	69	—	—	—	—	—	—	—	—		5 * Stunna
"We Made It" (Busta Rhymes featuring Linkin Park)	2008	65	—	—	40	37	11	12	13	24	10		—N/a
"Ya Heard Me" (B.G. featuring Juvenile, Lil Wayne and Trey Songz)	2008	—	—	—	—	—	—	—	—	—	—		Too Hood 2 Be Hollywood
"Ain't Sayin' Nothin'" (Fat Joe featuring Plies and Dre)	2008	93	—	—	—	—	—	—	—	—	—		The Elephant in the Room
"My Life" (The Game featuring Lil Wayne)	2008	21	15	4	—	42	—	36	—	49	34		LAX
"Peace Sign/Index Down" (Gym Class Heroes featuring Busta Rhymes)	2008	—	—	—	—	—	—	—	—	—	—		The Quilt
"Make the World Go Round" (Nas featuring The Game and Chris Brown)	2008	—	—	—	—	—	—	—	—	—	—		Untitled Nas album
"All My Life (In the Ghetto)" (Jay Rock featuring Lil Wayne and will.i.am)	2008	—	10	—	—	—	—	—	—	—	—		Follow Me Home
"Camera Phone" (The Game featuring Ne-Yo)	2009	—	—	—	—	—	—	—	—	—	48		LAX
"Chillin" (Wale featuring Lady Gaga)	2009	99	—	—	29	73	—	19	—	—	12		Attention Deficit
"On Fire" (Lil Wayne)	2009	62	54	25	—	—	—	—	—	—	—		Rebirth
"If It Ain't About Money" (Fat Joe featuring Trey Songz)	2010	—	57	25	—	—	—	—	—	—	—		The Darkside Vol. 1
"Red Nation" (The Game featuring Lil Wayne)	2011	62	22	—	—	—	—	—	—	—	—		The R.E.D. Album
"It's Good" (Lil Wayne featuring Drake and Jadakiss)	2011	79	—	—	—	—	—	—	—	—	—		Tha Carter IV
"Celebration" (The Game featuring Chris Brown, Tyga, Wiz Khalifa and Lil Wayne)	2012	81	24	19	—	—	—	—	—	—	—		Jesus Piece
"All That (Lady)" (The Game featuring Lil Wayne, Big Sean, Fabolous and Jeremih)	2013	—	48	—	—	—	—	—	—	—	—		Jesus Piece
"All the Way Up" (Fat Joe and Remy Ma featuring French Montana)	2016	27	9	4	46	—	—	—	—	—	—	RIAA: 2× Platinum	Plata o Plomo
"Cookin" (Fat Joe, Remy Ma and French Montana featuring RySoValid)	2016	—	—	—	—	—	—	—	—	—	—		Plata o Plomo
"Money Showers" (featuring Ty Dolla Sign)	2016	—	—	—	—	—	—	—	—	—	—		Plata o Plomo
"Don't Mind" (Kent Jones)	2016	8	4	2	23	39	29	67	43	65	26	RIAA: Platinum	Tours
"Holy Key" (DJ Khaled featuring Big Sean, Kendrick Lamar and Betty Wright)	2016	84	—	—	—	—	—	—	—	—	—		Major Key
"Heartbreak" (Fat Joe featuring The-Dream and Vindata)	2017	—	—	—	—	—	—	—	—	—	—		Plata o Plomo
"So Excited" (Fat Joe featuring Dre)	2017	— (Note: "So Excited" did not enter the Billboard Hot 100, but peaked at number 24 on the Bubbling Under Hot 100 Singles chart.)	— (Note: "So Excited" did not enter the Hot R&B/Hip-Hop Songs chart, but peaked at number six on the Bubbling Under R&B/Hip-Hop Singles chart.)	—	—	—	—	—	—	—	—		Non-album singles
"Pick It Up" (Fat Joe featuring Dre)	2018	—	—	—	—	—	—	—	—	—	—		Non-album singles
"Momma" (Fat Joe, Dre and Big Sean)	2018	—	—	—	—	—	—	—	—	—	—		Non-album singles
"Attention" (Fat Joe, Dre featuring Chris Brown)	2018	—	40	33	75	—	—	—	—	—	—		Non-album singles
"Pullin" (Fat Joe, Dre and Lil Wayne)	2019	—	—	—	—	—	—	—	—	—	—		Family Ties
"Yes" (Fat Joe, Cardi B and Anuel AA)	2019	— (Note: "Yes" did not enter the Billboard Hot 100, but peaked at number 17 on the Bubbling Under Hot 100 chart.)	—	—	—	—	—	—	—	—	—		Family Ties
"Deep" (Fat Joe and Dre)	2019	—	—	—	—	—	—	—	—	—	—		Family Ties
"—" denotes a recording that did not chart or was not released in that territory.
