= The R.E.D. Album =

Studio album by Game
- Released: August 23, 2011
- Recorded: 2009–11
- Studios: Ameraycan Recording Studios; Pacifique Recording Studios (North Hollywood, California); Encore Recording Studios (Burbank, California); Paramount Recording Studios (Hollywood, California)
- Genres: West Coast hip hop; gangsta rap
- Length: 72:32
- Labels: DGC; Interscope
- Producers: The Game; Pharrell; Dr Dre; Mars; Pebrocks; Cool & Dre; Dirk Pate; DJ Khalil; Big Kast; 1500 or Nothin'; Hit-Boy; Maestro; Nat Powers; Don Cannon; The Futuristics; DJ Premier; Streetrunner; I.L.O.

Game chronology
LAX (2008)	The R.E.D. Album (2011)	Jesus Piece (2012)

Alternative cover
- Alternate cover

Alternative cover
- Alternate cover

Singles from The R.E.D. Album
- 1. "Red Nation" Released: April 12, 2011; 2. "Pot of Gold" Released: June 28, 2011

The R.E.D. Album is the fourth studio album by American rapper the Game. It was released on August 23, 2011, by DGC Records and Interscope Records which serves as Game's first release under DGC and his first album for Interscope since 2005's The Documentary. His previous two, Doctor's Advocate (2006) and LAX (2008), were released under Interscope's subsidiary imprint, Geffen Records.

Recording sessions for the album took place from 2009 to 2011 at four different recording studios in California. Dr. Dre, Pharrell Williams and Mars (of production group 1500 or Nothin') served as executive producers on the album, and includes a wide range of producers such as Boi-1da, Cool & Dre, DJ Khalil, DJ Premier, Don Cannon, Hit-Boy, Maestro, StreetRunner, Nat Powers and the Futuristics. The featured guests include rappers Dr. Dre, Snoop Dogg, Tyler, the Creator, Lil Wayne and Kendrick Lamar, and singers Lloyd, Mario, Chris Brown and Nelly Furtado.

The album debuted at number one on the US Billboard 200, selling 98,000 copies in its first week, and produced two singles: the controversial "Red Nation" and "Pot of Gold", which attained some Billboard and worldwide chart success. Upon its release, The R.E.D. Album received generally mixed to positive reviews from music critics, who commended his passionate performance on the record and ear for production.

== Background ==
"The R.E.D. Album, people think the R.E.D. stands for gangbanging. I am what I am. [...] R.E.D. — that's rededicated. Rededicated to hip-hop [...] to my 'hood, Compton. Rededicated to my family, rededicated to everything."

— Game talking about rededication to hip-hop

In 2008, Game released his third studio album, LAX. After the release, Game announced his plan to retire from music, just to spend more time with his family and focus on what's more important to him during the time. However, he later stated that Jimmy Iovine, former chairman of Interscope Geffen A&M Records (a Universal Music Group faction which houses Game's labels Interscope Records and Geffen Records), did not yet want him to retire, and the label wanted him to come back and release another album, which was for February 2009. Game commented these statements about given was so far off his radar and that it was ridiculous. He later stated "Now, if you give me like five, ten million dollars or something to do it[...]I'm the biggest thing in that building now, with the recent demise of G-Unit, and that's just it, man."

In May 2009, it was revealed Game had begun working on a new album titled D.O.C. or Diary of Compton, if he could get help from the original N.W.A members, including Dr. Dre, Ice Cube, DJ Yella and MC Ren. In November 2009, HipHopDX interviewed Game about the album's current status, saying it had been shelved because he needed help from Dr. Dre, Ice Cube and Snoop Dogg with key elements that were not there when he started the project. In the same interview, Game revealed he partly chose to give the album's title, because his fans simply gave the early material he recorded for "R.E.D". He later stated he would rededicate himself to hip hop music and make a comeback, after stating he would be retiring after the release of his third album LAX (2008). In an interview with MTV, he explained the title's meaning: "R.E.D." stood for "RE-Dedication", not his affiliation with the notorious street gang, the Bloods, as previously thought. Game, Pharrell Williams, and Mars of 1500 or Nothin' served as executive producers on the album. The guest appearances on the album will be Dr. Dre, Kendrick Lamar, Snoop Dogg, Lil Wayne, Tyler, the Creator, Beanie Sigel, E-40, Chris Brown, Big Boi, Wale, Nelly Furtado, Drake, Rick Ross and Young Jeezy, among others. The production on the album was conducted by Pharrell, Hit-Boy, Cool & Dre, Streetrunner, Maestro, DJ Khalil, Boi-1da, DJ Premier, Don Cannon, the Futuristics and 1500 or Nothin', among others.

== Recording and production ==
Recording sessions for the album took place at Ameraycan Recording Studios, at Pacifique Recording Studios both located in North Hollywood, California, at Encore Recording Studios in Burbank, California and at Paramount Recording Studios in Hollywood, California. Recording sessions for the album began on May 13, 2009, and it was revealed Game began recording with Timbaland and Drumma Boy in Los Angeles. Game also revealed to MTV; he had been working with record producers J.R. Rotem, Mike Lynn and Cool & Dre and hoped to receive production from Kanye West. In an interview with XXL, Boi-1da stated he had given beats to Game on the album.

In an interview with XXL, Game confirmed the album's featured guests would include fellow rappers Lil Wayne, Pharrell Williams, Gucci Mane and Kanye West, and also voiced his desire to work with pop singer Lady Gaga, stating he was trying to get Interscope Records co-founder Jimmy Iovine to allow this collaboration to come to fruition. On October 3, 2009, Snoop Dogg posted a picture on his Twitter account featuring himself alongside Dr. Dre and Game in the studio working together. The picture was taken a day earlier, and it marked the first time Game had worked with Dr. Dre for some years since the beef with former G-Unit labelmate 50 Cent caused him to lose his record deal at Aftermath Entertainment and Interscope, and release his first two albums on Geffen. In January 2010, Game posted a picture of himself wearing several chains, all with the Aftermath Entertainment logo attached to them, with the caption reading "It's funny how things come Full Circle" to his own Twitter page, suggesting that he had returned to the record label: this was later officially confirmed.

Game later revealed Dr. Dre and Pharrell Williams would be serving as the executive producer on the album. However, later Game stated he was now "unclear" if Dr. Dre would be producing on the album at all. In January 2010, Game revealed to Billboard that DJ Khalil has contributed the production on the album. He revealed to Rap-Up that both Chris Brown and Dr. Dre would be featured on the album. Akon was also confirmed to be featured on a track titled "Would I Be Wrong?" along with production from Polow da Don. Game later confirmed a collaboration with Justin Timberlake saying that "I never thought in my life that I would ever work with Justin, and then for it to turn out and be as catastrophic as it was amazing." He also confirmed that he enlisted Nicki Minaj for a feature. Game recorded a song with both rappers Jim Jones and Jadakiss titled "Gangs in New York" which highlighted production from new and upcoming record producer Scoop DeVille.

Game later revealed he collaborated with Rick Ross, Robin Thicke, Ashanti, Bow Wow, Beanie Sigel and Jay Electronica. Game revealed rapper and record producer RZA had also contributed production on the album. Game also stated that Belizean rapper Shyne would be featured on the album as well. On June 11, 2010, Game leaked a song on his Twitter account titled "We Do It Big". The song featured a guest appearance from Yung Joc and it contains a sample from the classic hit "Juicy", performed by the Notorious B.I.G. In an interview on 95.7 The Beat, he also spoke during a live chat, in which he stated a fellow rapper Nas would not make it to be featured on the album at this time. Game also gave his thoughts on Drake and Will Smith. In addition to this, Game confirmed Nelly Furtado, T.I. and Snoop Dogg would be featured on the album, with production coming from Dr. Dre, the Neptunes, Kanye West and Timbaland. During his promotional tour of America, Game spoke to Jenny Boom Boom on Hot 97.3 and stated about the repeated delays have meant he been able to be working with DJ Toomp, and was also hoping to record with DJ Premier, before the album's release.

Game confirmed that fellow West Coast rapper Snoop Dogg would appear twice on the album, as well as rapper Lupe Fiasco, amongst the features on the album. He also stated "pending we get the song cleared", Jay Electronica and Nas would be featured on the album forsure. On June 23, 2010, Game recorded a track from the album titled "Good Girl, Bad Girl" at Encore Studios in Burbank, California. The track features Canadian rapper Drake and produced by Cool & Dre, also Queen Latifah who was in the recordings at the studio, but didn't collaborate with him. Game later revealed Dr. Dre wouldn't just produce on the album, he would be on there vocally. In August 2010, producer Bangladesh stated he had been sending Game tracks for the record. Drumma Boy also stated he had produced a song on the album which also featured Young Buck, and was hoping to get Nipsey Hussle on the track as well. Former Black Wall Street artist, Mysonne, was also confirmed he had worked on this album with Game.

On December 7, 2010, it was confirmed that B.o.B was working on the record with Game. Game later confirmed he had recording sessions with production team 1500 or Nothin', and later officially confirmed Kanye West and DJ Premier has contributed production for the album. It was also stated that he had recording sessions with several other record producers, including Jim Jonsin, Swizz Beatz, Just Blaze, the Futuristics, Maestro, Ryan Leslie, Streetrunner, Don Cannon, Hi-Tek, Hit-Boy, Nottz, Phonix Beats and Lex Luger. He was later revealed K-Young, Diddy, Young Jeezy, Busta Rhymes, Wiz Khalifa, Big Boi and AZ were all confirmed to be working on the album as well.

On January 18, 2011, Game tweeted along with a picture, featuring himself working on a song with actor-singer Tyrese Gibson. On January 30, 2011, in an interview with AllHipHop, Game confirmed that E-40 and Trey Songz would be featured on the album. On June 2, 2011, in an interview with Vibe, Game revealed the album would feature Tyler, the Creator on a track titled "Martians vs. Goblins". He also revealed the album featured a Dr. Dre produced song titled "Dead People" about his father, and described it as a "sort of like a dream, but I wish it would've came true when I was a kid, so I kind of lived it out." On June 11, 2011, Game confirmed that Kendrick Lamar would be featured on the album as well.

Game spoke about a reflective song he recorded with singer Nelly Furtado titled "Mother Knows", produced by the Neptunes, describing it as a "walk through a time period in my life when I was young and my mom was trying to instill all these values in me and I was just a rebel and going against everything she said". He also compared Nelly Furtado's vocals on the hook to Janet Jackson, saying "nobody can really sing in that cadence". On June 13, 2011, Game revealed he did a song with rapper Lupe Fiasco titled "Skate On". On June 16, 2011, in an interview with Rap-Up, Game expressed his own interest in collaborating with a fellow rapper J. Cole.

On June 23, 2011, it was confirmed that Usher would be featured on the album. On July 5, 2011, it was confirmed Mars from the production duo 1500 or Nothin' would also be executive producing on the album. On July 9, 2011, Wale himself confirmed he would be featured on the album. On August 4, 2011, almost over three years of spending time on recording for this album confirming Game finally finished recording for the entire album. The album's featured guest appearances from Dr. Dre, Tyler, the Creator, Snoop Dogg, Lil Wayne, Rick Ross, Beanie Sigel, E-40, Kendrick Lamar, Drake, Wale, Big Boi, Mario, Young Jeezy, Chris Brown and Nelly Furtado. It was also confirmed by Game that Dr. Dre would narrate the entire album.

== Release and promotion ==
"There's a lot more that goes into it than just putting a burn in the CD, throwing it in the package, and putting it in Best Buy," he explained. "I've been touring, I had a daughter, the label politics, the timing, other people having to drop, picking the right single[...] There's a lot of things that go into a major distributed album and the timing hasn't been right yet."

— Game talking about the delays on The R.E.D. Album

From 2009, the album suffered numerous delays, rescheduled a remarkable 10 times. The first release date for the album was set for December 1, 2009, but was pushed back to December 8, 2009. However, that date would also be later changed to December 15, 2009, and it was moved back once more to February 16, 2010, reportedly due to Dr. Dre needing more time to finish production for the album. The next confirming date for the album was set to be released on June 15, 2010, but was changed to June 29, 2010.

The next release date for the album was listed as July 6, 2010, but at this time Game delayed the release date himself, because he wanted to release the album on August 24, 2010, in order to dedicated to a Los Angeles Lakers player Kobe Bryant. He stated he chose the date to be released on August 24, which causes him to get caught up during the 2010 NBA Finals frenzy and was inspired by Bryant, but later the date would be pushed back as well.

On May 5, 2011, after over two years of delays, it was officially confirmed by Game and Iovine the album would be officially released for the date of August 2011, and it would not be pushed back any further. On May 17, 2011, Game announced via Twitter; he had just finished a conference call with Jimmy Iovine and Interscope Records, then he went on and officially confirmed the album would be officially released on August 23, 2011. Unlike in what was happening in the past, Game promised the new date given would be permanent.

Before the album's official release, Game admitted and told Billboard; he delayed the release of the album to cause maximum disruption to his hip-hop rivals, stating he wanted to drop the album right in the middle of Jay-Z and Kanye West's collaboration Watch the Throne and Lil Wayne's Tha Carter IV, saying it was his ingenious plan.

=== Mixtapes ===
From 2010 and 2011, Game released several free-to-download mixtapes, partly in order to act as promotion for the album. The first of these mixtapes, The Red Room, was released on April 26, 2010. The mixtape was originally intended to be hosted by DJ Drama, as a "Gangsta Grillz" project; however, he cancelled his participation in the project after hearing several of the disses aimed at him in the freestyle track titled "400 Bars", and was replaced by long-time Game collaborator DJ Skee. The aforementioned "400 Bars", a 20-minute-long freestyle over four-hundred consecutive bars of music (over the production of the Jay Electronica song titled "Exhibit C") was later only included on the mixtape in a remixed form, titled "The Skeemix". Game admitted it was the hardest freestyle he had ever had to record, having previously recorded "300 Bars" and "360 Bars" for previous mixtapes. The tape featured guest appearances from Nipsey Hussle, Lil Wayne, Birdman, Kanary Diamonds, Busta Rhymes, Bizzy Bone, Hurricane Chris, Fabolous, and several members of Game's own record label, The Black Wall Street Records, including XO, K-Young, Menace, Maad Maxx and Juice. Production was handled by several record producers, including Pharrell Williams, Ryan Leslie, Cool & Dre, Scoop DeVille, Bink! and Phonix Beats, among others.

On August 3, 2010, Game released the mixtape titled Brake Lights, which was availablly to download through XXL, once again hosted by DJ Skee. The tape featured guest appearances from Snoop Dogg, Nas, T.I., Akon, Rick Ross, Waka Flocka Flame, Busta Rhymes, Robin Thicke and Shawty Lo, along with the production handled by several producers, including DJ Toomp, J.R. Rotem, Lex Luger and Rich Skillz, among others. In an interview with XXL, Game revealed Brake Lights was designed to be an appetiser to The R.E.D. Album, released mainly to keep up anticipation for the album until its completion.

On January 24, 2011, Game released the double disc mixtape Purp & Patron, once again (for the third time in the row) hosted by DJ Skee, alongside by Funkmaster Flex. The tape featured guest appearances from Pharrell Williams, Snoop Dogg, Lil Wayne, Detail, Tools, Sam Hook, Menace, TD, Mistah F.A.B., the Jacka, Wiz Khalifa, Fabolous, Rev. Burke, Mysonne, T-Pain, Rick Ross, Ashanti, Kurupt, Lil Boosie, Jim Jones, Clinton Sparks, Mike Epps, Ashley Cole, Swizz Beatz, Travis Barker, Doug E. Fresh, Big Daddy Kane, KRS-One and Dre, and the mixtape's production was handled by several record producers, including Dr. Dre, Ervin 'EP' Pope, the Neptunes, Bink, DJ Shake, Nottz, 1500 or Nothin', Che Vicious, D.A. Dorman, Cool & Dre, RZA, Stargate, Mike City, Raw Uncut, Denaun Porter, DJ Haze, DJ Green Lantern and Travis Barker, among others.

Upon its release, the mixtape was an internet download success, and received generally positive reviews from music critics. Only a week after the mixtape's initial release, a sequel was released, titled Purp & Patron: The Hangover. The tape is a 10-track mixtape full of leftover songs, in which were not included on the original Purp & Patron. The tape features guest appearances from Birdman, Mars of 1500 or Nothin', Timbaland, Kurupt, JoiStaRR, David Banner, Ghostface Killah, Joell Ortiz, Young Chris, Eve, Black Thought, Money Malc, Fat Joe, Fred the Godson, Diggy Simmons, Jermaine Dupri, and Busta Rhymes, and the mixtape's production was handled by several record producers, including 1500 or Nothin', Timbaland, Just Blaze, Amadeus and Sean C & LV, among others.

Game and Mars of production duo 1500 or Nothin released one final mixtape as part of the run-up to the album's release, titled HoodMorning [No Typo]: Candy Coronas, on August 1, 2011. The tape features guest appearances from Dr. Dre, Snoop Dogg, Lil Wayne, Birdman, Gucci Mane, B.o.B, Wiz Khalifa, Sam Cooke, Redman, Joi StaRR, Paypa, Trey Songz and Yelawolf. The production on the mixtape was handled by several record producers, including Mars, DJ Khalil, Lifted, Che Vicious, Boi-1da, Terrace Martin, Gun Roulet, Point Guard, Rance, Cool & Dre and Jim Jonsin, among others.

=== Tour ===
In October 2011, Game announced upcoming tour dates for performances to promote his new album. Game assembled a coast-to-coast US trek which started from October 20 and ended November 17. Just three days after the US tour, Game went on the Red Album European Tour 2011. The tour began on November 20, 2011 and concluded on December 22, 2011, stopping in Dublin, Glasgow, Paris, Stuttgart, Milan, Zürich, Amsterdam, Copenhagen, Helsinki, Stockholm and Oslo. Due to its success, Game extended the Euro tour in February 2012 to include more dates in Australia and New Zealand.

== Singles ==
"Red Nation" was announced as the album's first single on March 2, 2011. The song features production from Cool & Dre, and Sean "Diddy" Combs announced via his Twitter page, the single would feature a fellow American rapper Lil Wayne. Anticipated by fans to be officially released, the single was officially released to the iTunes Store on April 12, 2011, but it did not achieve commercial success worldwide nor in the United States, only peaking at number 62 on the US Billboard Hot 100. In spite of reaching chart success, the music video for the single came under some controversy, being banned from airing on cable networks such as MTV and BET due to being deemed inappropriate and being a portrayal of gang culture, causing a controversy due to Game's alleged affiliation with the notorious Los Angeles, California gang the Bloods. However, Game refused to let the snub derail his plans for promotion, and vowed to release the video online so fans can form their own opinions about the controversy for themselves. After the music video quickly received over 3 million views on YouTube, there were rumors that BET and MTV were reconsidering airing the banned "Red Nation" video.

On June 22, 2011, it was confirmed, the album's second single titled "Pot of Gold" featuring Chris Brown. The production on the song was handled by the Futuristics. The single was officially released to the iTunes Store on June 28, 2011. The song debuted at number 75 on the Hot R&B/Hip-Hop Songs chart in the United States for the week ending July 30, 2011, and has since peaked at number fifty-five. Unlike the album's first single "Red Nation", "Pot of Gold" managed to attain some Billboard and worldwide chart success; in Belgium the song charted at number 29 on the Belgium (Ultratip Flanders), in Switzerland the song charted at number 72 on the Swiss Singles Chart, and in the United Kingdom the song charted at number 16 on the UK R&B Singles Chart and at number 58 on the UK Singles Chart. While shooting for the single's music video an incident occurred with record producer and one half of the production duo 1500 or Nothin' Mars was held up at gunpoint and got robbed of $12,000 in cash and jewelry by two armed robbers. The music video for the single was officially released on July 25, 2011.

=== Promotional singles ===
The album's promotional single, titled "Krazy", was released on November 10, 2009 to the iTunes Store.

The album's second promotional single, titled "Big Money", was released on December 15, 2009 to the iTunes Store.

The album's third promotional single "It Must Be Me" was released on April 14, 2010 to the radio, then officially being released on April 27, 2010 to the iTunes Store and on February 3, 2010. The music video for "It Must Be Me" was set to premiere live on 106 & Park on June 4, 2010, but it was never premiered.

Game released the album's fourth promotional single, titled "Shake", which was produced by Cool & Dre. However, it was not released on the iTunes Store. MTV premiered the video for "Shake" on April 27, 2010.

=== Other songs ===
The song "Ain't No Doubt About It", which featured the vocals of Justin Timberlake and Pharrell Williams, was originally intended as the lead single for The R.E.D. Album. In an interview with Complex, the Game revealed that "Krazy", "Big Money", and "It Must Be Me" were all promotional singles for iTunes and digital download and confirmed that none of them would be included on the album. In the same interview, he also confirmed that the song "Ain't No Doubt About It" was now considered to be a promotional single. "Ain't No Doubt About It" was released on iTunes on May 18, 2011, followed by its accompanying music video on July 4, 2011.

After these songs failed to chart, Game removed them from the album and chose instead to release them on various mixtapes, including The Red Room and Brake Lights mixtapes. Additionally, the song "Bottles & Rockin' J's" featuring DJ Khaled, Fabolous, Lil Wayne, Busta Rhymes and Rick Ross, with production by Lex Luger, was being considered as the album's second official single. However, it was later confirmed to be the album's sixth promotional single. It would later be included in the Game's 2012 mixtape California Republic.

== Commercial performance ==
The R.E.D. Album was one of the most anticipated albums of 2011. The album debuted at number one on the Billboard 200, with first week sales of 98,000 copies in the United States of America, ousting Jay-Z and Kanye West's collaborative album, Watch the Throne, from the top position. It serves as Game's third number-one album in the US and his final number one Billboard 200 album in his career, following The Documentary (2005) and Doctor's Advocate (2006), his last album, LAX (2008), debuted at number two with 239,000 according to Nielsen SoundScan. It also reached number one on Billboard's Top R&B/Hip-Hop Albums and Top Rap Albums charts. In its second week on the Billboard 200, the album fell to number 8 with well over 40,000 copies sold. In Canada, it entered at number 2 on the Canadian Albums Chart, with first week sales of well over 10,000 copies. In the United Kingdom, the album debuted at number 14 on the UK Albums Chart, with first week sales of well over 10,148 copies. In Austria, the album debuted at number 39 on the Austrian Albums Chart, and in Australia, the album debuted at number 12 on the Australian Albums Chart. In Belgian, the album debuted at number 75 on the Belgian Albums Chart (Flanders) and peaked at number 32, and in the Belgian Albums Chart (Wallonia) the album debuted at number 36. In Denmark, the album debuted at number 17 on the Danish Albums Chart, in the Netherlands, the album debuted at number 45 on the Dutch Albums Chart, in the France, the album debuted at number 30 on the French Albums Chart, in the Republic of Ireland, the album debuted at number 7 on the Irish Albums Chart, in New Zealand, the album debuted at number 19 on the New Zealand Albums Chart, in Norway, the album debuted at number 28 on the Norwegian Albums Chart and peaked at number 27, and in Switzerland, the album debuted at number 7 on the Swiss Albums Chart.

== Critical response ==
Professional ratings
Aggregate scores
Source	Rating
Metacritic	61/100
Review scores
Source	Rating
AllMusic	4/5 stars
The A.V. Club	C
The Boston Globe	(favorable)
Los Angeles Times	3.5/4 stars
Pitchfork	(4.8/10.0)
PopMatters	(5/10)
Rolling Stone	2/5 stars
Slant Magazine	3/5 stars
USA Today	3/4 stars
The Village Voice	(mixed)
XXL	L

The R.E.D. Album received generally positive reviews from music critics. At Metacritic, which assigns a weighted mean rating out of 100 to reviews from mainstream critics, the album received an average score of 61, based on 16 reviews, which indicates "generally favorable reviews". AllMusic editor David Jeffries viewed it as if "you've got an obsession-free, almost relatable success that sacrifices none of the man's fire or skill." [...] and perceived that "Game doesn't need strife in his life to create an excellent album, but for the sake of a thrilling cut, he'll still seek it out." BBC Music stated that, "Overall, The R.E.D. Album stands as a solid return for its maker, as long-time listeners will connect with his no-frills lyrics and unsettling artistic demeanour." Evan Rytlewski of The A.V. Club commented that "Throughout The R.E.D. Album, he runs himself ragged trying to realize the masterpiece he pictures in his head, but he just doesn't have the coordination to pull it off." Ken Capobianco of The Boston Globe wrote that, "The Game shows a willingness to reinvent himself with some beats that are as penetrating and resourceful as his engaging rhymes filled with sports and pop-culture references." Slant Magazine's Jesse Cataldo felt that "The profusion of guests and mania for exhibiting street hardness sometimes makes The R.E.D. Album feel unfocused and exhausting." Edna Gundersen of USA Today praised the rapper's "chemistry" and wrote that "Game invigorates West Coast rap with grit, ferocity, vivid rhymes, crushing beats and even a hilarious and vicious sci-fi romp."

Writer David Malitz of The Washington Post felt that the album "is overstuffed with high-wattage cameos". [...] adding that "Game surrounds himself with these stars, regularly gets out-rapped by them and proceeds to thrust his chest out and proclaim his superiority." Los Angeles Times writer Mikael Wood commented that "In stark contrast with such charm merchants as Jay-Z and Lil Wayne, Game's low likability is no impediment to his art; indeed, The R.E.D. Album, his fourth studio set, succeeds not in spite of his character [...] flaws but because of them." Carl Chery of XXL gave the album a rating of "L" and noted "Game's flows and lyrical skills are still sharp, but his narrative hasn't changed much through the course of four albums". Despite that "one shouldn't be surprised," David Amidon of PopMatters wrote "A lot of what initially made Game an intriguing artist is missing from this release, replaced instead by fleeting moments of great music and extended periods of mediocrity or whackness." [...] and added that "neither should one be surprised at the schizophrenic nature that pervades much of the album". Pitchfork's Jordan Sargent commented that the album's "unsightly storm of star power is the backbone [...] of what could've been a coherent album." Arwa Haider of Metro viewed it as a "cinematic drama of the rapper's Westside life experience, which could easily have become schmaltzy but is fuelled by his rugged wordplay and guests on sharp form."

Monica Herrera of Rolling Stone stated that "the Compton MC doesn't seem to have given his long-delayed fourth album top priority." [...] however commented "It's proof that, just when you least expect it, he can still rage compellingly." Jayson Greene of The Village Voice gave a mixed review, writing "when there is a firm hand reining him in, Game can still make good rap music. Left to his own devices, however, he produces a dismaying mess." Chase McMullen of One Thirty BPM expressed a mixed response towards the album, stating "With this mixed bag he's likely cemented his reputation as a MC that was blessed with a sack of classic beats for his debut, now just a rapper like the rest of 'em." Chad Grischow of IGN wrote "Fortunately, Game is on point most of the time here, delivering an excellent piece of hardened west coast rap leaving you wanting the two albums he promises before quitting rap as soon as possible." Anupa Mistry of Now felt that "The features wouldn't be so bad if Game didn't yield to the wattage and personalities of his co-stars. (Again, he can rap when he tries.) Used as a constant crutch, however, they quell his ferocity."

Game was critical about his album and says: "If I had a choice, I would say fuck L.A.X. and R.E.D. because I was kind of lost in trying to re-find the love for hip-hop". He also doesn't feel the album was perfect by his standards compared to his previous albums.

== Track listing ==
No.	Title	Writer(s)	Producer(s)	Length
1.	"Dr. Dre Intro"	Andre Young		0:26
2.	"The City" (featuring Kendrick Lamar)	Taylor; Andre Lyon; Marcello Valenzano; Kendrick Duckworth; J. Steinman	Cool & Dre	5:41
3.	"Drug Test" (featuring Dr. Dre, Snoop Dogg and Sly)	Taylor; Young; Calvin Broadus, Jr.; Khalil Abdul-Rahman; Danny Tannenbaum; Sly Jordan; Brian Honeycutt	DJ Khalil	2:46
4.	"Martians vs. Goblins" (featuring Tyler, the Creator and Lil Wayne)	Taylor; Dwayne Carter, Jr.; Tyler Okonma; Laranee Dopson; Brody Brown; Lamar Edwards	1500 or Nothin'	3:48
5.	"Red Nation" (featuring Lil Wayne)	Taylor; Carter, Jr.; Lyon; Valenzano; E. Guenther; F. Senfter	Cool & Dre	3:49
6.	"Dr. Dre 1"	Taylor		0:25
7.	"Good Girls Go Bad" (featuring Drake)	Taylor; Lyon; Valenzano; Aubrey Graham; J.B. Corbitt; C. Reid	Cool & Dre	4:38
8.	"Ricky"	Taylor; Abdul-Rahman; Tannenbaum; Columbus Smith	DJ Khalil	4:07
9.	"The Good, the Bad, the Ugly"	Taylor; Chauncey Hollis	Hit-Boy	2:28
10.	"Heavy Artillery" (featuring Rick Ross and Beanie Sigel)	Taylor; Dwight Grant; William Roberts II; Nicholas Warwar; M. Anello; Bunny Sigler; Phillip Hurtt; Kenny Gamble	Streetrunner; I.L.O. (add.)	4:14
11.	"Paramedics" (featuring Young Jeezy)	Taylor; Jay Jenkins; Vaushaun Brooks	Maestro	4:56
12.	"Speakers on Blast" (featuring Big Boi and E-40)	Taylor; Antwan Patton; Earl Stevens; Edwards	Mars	5:11
13.	"Hello" (featuring Lloyd)	Taylor; Lloyd Polite; Edwards; S. Jean	1500 or Nothin'; Nat Powers	3:49
14.	"All the Way Gone" (featuring Wale and Mario)	Taylor; Don Cannon; Edwards; Mario Barrett; Olubowale Akintimehin	Don Cannon; Mars; Nat Powers	4:07
15.	"Pot of Gold" (featuring Chris Brown)	Taylor; Christopher Brown; Jean; R. Miller; A. Gardner; B. Rosenworcel	The Futuristics	3:21
16.	"Dr. Dre 2"	Young		0:24
17.	"All I Know"	Taylor; Lu Breeze; Matthew Samuels; A. Ortiz; C. Green	Boi-1da; Pebrocks (co.); Big Kast (co.)	4:03
18.	"Born in the Trap"	Taylor; Christopher Martin; V. McCoy	DJ Premier	3:46
19.	"Mama Knows" (featuring Nelly Furtado)	Taylor; Pharrell Williams	Pharrell Williams	3:52
20.	"California Dream"	Taylor; Edwards; G. Kerr; S. Robinson	Mars	6:12
21.	"Dr. Dre Outro"	Young		0:30

• (co.) Co-producer
• (add.) Additional production

iTunes bonus track
No.	Title	Writer(s)	Producer(s)	Length
22.	"Basic Bitch"	Taylor; Dirk Pate	Dirk Pate	3:34

f.y.e. exclusive bonus track
No.	Title	Writer(s)	Producer(s)	Length
22.	"I'm the King"	Taylor; Dopson; Edwards	1500 or Nothin'	5:25

Sample credits

Information taken from The R.E.D. Album's liner notes.

- "The City" contains a sample of "Tonight Is What It Means to Be Young" performed by Fire Inc.
- "Red Nation" contains a sample of "Kernkraft 400" performed by Zombie Nation.
- "Good Girls Go Bad" contains a sample of "Don't Make the Good Girls Go Bad" performed by Della Humphrey.
- "Ricky" contains a sample of Boyz n the Hood.
- "Paramedics" contains a sample from the video game Bastion.
- "Heavy Artillery" contain a sample of "I'm Just a Prisoner" performed by Billy Paul.
- "Pot of Gold" contains a sample of "Rocketship" performed by Guster.
- "Born in the Trap" contains a sample of "Love Theme" performed by Van McCoy.
- "California Dream" contains a sample of "All I Have" performed by the Moments.

== Personnel ==
Credits for The R.E.D. Album adapted from AllMusic.

=== Musicians ===
- Ice Cube - vocals
- Anthony Jackson - vocals
- Marvin Jones - vocals
- Rahki - drums
- Yasmine Richard - vocals
- Jameel Saleem - vocals
- Joi Starr - vocals
- Uncle Chucc - guitar
- Laura Vaidya - vocals
- Kamasi Washington - saxophone
- Siraaj Amnesia James - trumpet

=== Production ===
- Steve "B" Baughman - mixing
- Big Kast - producer
- Boi-1da - producer
- Calvin Broadus - composer
- Christopher Brody Brown - composer, producer
- Don Cannon - engineer, producer
- Andrew Coleman - digital arrangement, digital editing, engineer
- Cool - producer
- J.B. Corbitt - composer
- DJ Khalil - producer
- DJ Premier - mixing, producer
- Dr. Dre - mixing
- Larrance Dopson - keyboards, producer
- Lamar Edwards - composer, producer
- The Futuristics - producer
- Game - executive producer
- Brian "Big Bass" Gardner - mastering
- Geoff Gibbs - engineer
- Hit-Boy - producer
- Ilo - additional production, keyboards
- Mauricio Iragorri - engineer
- Step Johnson Jr. - A&R
- Samuel Kalandjian - engineer
- Mike Larson - engineer
- Maestro - producer
- Jonathan Mannion - photography
- Fabian Marasciullo - mixing
- MARS1 - executive producer
- Meeno - photography
- Greg Miller - publicity
- Pebrocks - producer
- Will Ragland - art direction, design
- Khalil Abdul Rahman - composer, keyboards, programming
- Robert Reyes - engineer
- Don Robinson - marketing
- Jason Sangerman - marketing
- Jason Schweitzer - mixing, saxophone
- Streetrunner - producer
- Danny Tannenbaum - composer, keyboards, violin
- Andrew Van Meter - producer
- Tony Villaflor - assistant
- Vic Wainstein - engineer
- Pharrell Williams - executive producer, producer
- Dontae Winslow - horn arrangements, trumpet

== Charts ==
=== Weekly charts ===
Chart (2011)	Peak position
Australian Albums (ARIA)	12
Australian Urban Albums (ARIA)	3
Austrian Albums (Ö3 Austria)	39
Belgian Albums (Ultratop Flanders)	32
Belgian Albums (Ultratop Wallonia)	36
Canadian Albums (Billboard)	2
Danish Albums (Hitlisten)	17
Dutch Albums (Album Top 100)	45
French Albums (SNEP)	30
German Albums (Offizielle Top 100)	22
Irish Albums (IRMA)	7
New Zealand Albums (RMNZ)	19
Norwegian Albums (VG-lista)	27
Swiss Albums (Schweizer Hitparade)	7
UK Albums (Official Charts)	14
UK R&B Albums (Official Charts)	2
US Billboard 200	1
US Top R&B/Hip-Hop Albums (Billboard)	1
US Top Rap Albums (Billboard)	1

=== Year-end charts ===
Chart (2011)	Position
US Billboard 200	157
US Top R&B/Hip-Hop Albums (Billboard)	40
Chart (2012)	Position
US Top R&B/Hip-Hop Albums (Billboard)	84

== Release history ==
List of release dates, showing country, record label, format, and catalog number
Region	Date	Format	Label	Catalog	Edition
France	August 19, 2011	CD, digital download	Polydor, Universal Music	B005GETSTY	Standard
Germany	August 19, 2011	CD	Interscope, Universal Music	B002U1ACBO	Standard
United Kingdom	August 22, 2011	CD, digital download	Polydor	B002U1ACBO	Standard
Canada	August 23, 2011	CD, digital download	DGC, Interscope	B002U1ACBO	Standard
United States	August 23, 2011	CD, digital download	DGC, Interscope	B002U1ACBO	Standard
