= Do Your Thing =

Do Your Thing, or Do Ya Thang may refer to:

== Film and TV ==
- Dil Chahta Hai (Hindī : दिल चाहता है, English: The Heart Desires, but billed as Do Your Thing) 2001 Indian film

== Music ==
=== Albums ===
- You Do Your Thing, by Montgomery Gentry, 2004
- Do Your Thing, by Papa Mali, 2007
- Do Your Thing, by Jackie Wilson, 1968

=== Songs ===
- "Do Your Thing" (7 Mile song), 1998
- "Do Your Thing" (Basement Jaxx song), 2003
- "Do Your Thing" (Charles Wright & the Watts 103rd Street Rhythm Band song), 1968
- "Do Ya Thing" (Gorillaz song)
- "Do Ya Thang" (Ice Cube song)
- "Do Ya Thang" (Rihanna song)
- "Do Your Thing", by Isaac Hayes, and covered by The Temptations, 1972, and James and Bobby Purify, 1974
- Do Your Thing, by Jungle Brothers, 2002
- "Do Your Thing", 2001 song by NSYNC from Celebrity

== See also ==
- Do Ya Thang (disambiguation)
