= I'm a Freak (disambiguation) =

"I'm a Freak" is a 2014 song by Enrique Iglesias featuring Pitbull.

I'm a Freak may also refer to:

== Music ==
- I'm a Freak, album by DJ Pierre 2003

=== Songs ===
- "I'm a Freak", song by DJ Pierre 2003
- "I'm a Freak", song by Yelawolf 2010
- "I'm a Freak", song by Fukkk Offf from Love Me Hate Me Kiss Me Kill Me 2009
- "World Class Sinner / I'm a Freak", song by Lily-Rose Depp, music from The Idol

== See also ==
- Creep, Radiohead song with the line "I'm a creep"
