= Red Nation =

Single by Game featuring Lil Wayne

from the album The R.E.D. Album
- Released: April 12, 2011
- Recorded: 2009
- Genre: Hip hop; gangsta rap
- Length: 3:50
- Label: DGC, Interscope
- Songwriters: Jayceon Taylor, Dwayne Carter, Andre Lyon, Marcello Valenzano, Emanuel Günther, Florian Senfter, David Whittaker
- Producer: Cool & Dre

Game singles chronology
"I'm Not a Gangsta" (2011)	"Red Nation" (2011)	"Pot of Gold" (2011)

Lil Wayne singles chronology
"Motivation" (2011)	"Red Nation" (2011)	"Dirty Dancer" (2011)

Music video
- "Red Nation" on YouTube

"Red Nation" is a song by American rapper and West Coast hip hop artist Game featuring vocals from rapper Lil Wayne, from his anticipated fourth studio album The R.E.D. Album. Released as the album's lead single on April 12, 2011, the song was written by Game and Lil Wayne, and it was produced by Miami-based production duo Cool & Dre, noted for producing three of Game's singles including the 2005 smash hit single "Hate It or Love It" which featured vocals from former fellow G-Unit member rapper 50 Cent. The single also marks the second collaboration between Game and Lil Wayne, their first collaboration being on Game's 2008 international hit single "My Life" from his third studio album LAX (2008), which featured vocals from Lil Wayne during the song's chorus. The song features a music sample of the nightclub hit "Kernkraft 400" (2000) (German for "Nuclear Energy 400") performed by German techno and electro band Zombie Nation from their debut album Leichenschmaus (1999).

The song's sample of Kernkraft 400 by Zombie Nation is considered one of the most famous songs of electronic dance music and a tune often played at sporting events. The single was also thought to be and mark Game's first song to be released back under the Aftermath Entertainment and Interscope Records labels, the two record labels that released his debut studio album The Documentary (2005), after resigning back with Interscope Records back in 2009 later resigning back with Aftermath Entertainment in early 2010, and before a beef with former fellow G-Unit labelmate and group member 50 Cent caused him to release his two following albums and singles on Geffen Records, but this was proved untrue. On March 10, 2011 Game sent the single to Hip hop DJ Funkmaster Flex whom premiered it on his popular radio show on WQHT Hot 97 in New York City, New York. The song was well received by listeners unlike his previous four released singles.

In the United States, "Red Nation" debuted at the number 62 position on the Billboard Hot 100. The music video for the song was directed by Parris, and it premiered on Thursday, May 12, 2011. The video had been banned from airing on cable networks MTV and BET due to being deemed inappropriate and being a portrayal of gang culture, causing a controversy due to Game's alleged affiliation with the notorious Los Angeles gang the Bloods. However, Game refused to let the snub derail his plans for promotion, so he still vowed to release the video online so fans can form their own opinions about the controversy for themselves. After the music video quickly received over 3 million views on YouTube, there were rumors that BET and MTV were reconsidering airing the banned "Red Nation" video.

== Background ==
After having a few false starts with chart failing singles, starting back with 2009's "Krazy" (which featured both Gucci Mane and Timbaland) and "Big Money" followed by 2010's "It Must Be Me" (in which it featured Pharrell) and "Ain't No Doubt About It" (which featured Justin Timberlake and Pharrell) all failing to chart, Game decided to have them all removed from the album and instead release them on mixtapes, those including on The Red Room and the Brake Lights mixtapes. With the album also reportedly suffering numerous delays since 2009, Game also decided to have canceled a series of listening sessions so that he could focus on recording new material for the album.

Later in 2011 following the release of his mixtape Purp & Patron, which immediately became widely praised as one of the best hip hop mixtapes of 2011 and after generating buzz from the mixtape, Game regained the center of attention on when he was officially going to release the album's official single. Later on March 2, 2011, it was confirmed by producers Cool & Dre via their Twitter that the first official single from the album would be titled "Red Nation".

In the beginning there was rumors that surfaced around that the single would feature all three rappers Wiz Khalifa, B.o.B and Lil Wayne, but on March 7, 2011 it was confirmed by Cool & Dre via their Twitter that the single would not feature Wiz Khalifa nor B.o.B, only leaving Lil Wayne in question if he would then only be the one to be featured on the song. On March 8, 2011, it was officially announced by Sean "Diddy" Combs via his Twitter that the single would indeed feature rapper Lil Wayne.

== Composition ==
"Red Nation" features rap verses from Game and vocals from Lil Wayne during the song's chorus, who is credited as a featured artist. It is an anthemic rap hip hop song with influences of techno and electro. The track also has pop-rap musical styles. The song contains a music sample of the 2000 single "Kernkraft 400" by the band Zombie Nation, the sample being a jolt of electro with synths and piano complementing a sampled techno riff. The song "Kernkraft 400" (German for "Nuclear Energy 400") is considered one of the most famous songs of electronic dance music and a tune often played at sporting events, the song, specifically titled as the "Sport Chant Remix" or the "Sport Chant Stadium Remix", is popular at North American sporting events for goals, home runs, and other celebrations. This version of the song is known by its signature "Whoa-oh-oh" chanting at the beginning of the song.

== Premiere and release ==
On March 10, 2011, Game sent "Red Nation" to Hip hop DJ Funkmaster Flex where he officially premiered it on his popular radio show on WQHT Hot 97 in New York City, New York. The song was well received by listeners unlike his previous four released singles. Anticipated by fans to be officially released, "Red Nation" was officially released to the iTunes Store on April 12, 2011 in the United States. Later on April 15, 2011 the single was officially released in both Australia and Switzerland, then later it was officially released worldwide on May 3, 2011.

== Critical reception ==
Amanda Hensel from PopCrush gave the song a positive review, saying the song "will get you out of your seat cheering for the rapper’s much anticipated return, but we could see the second single coming in strong."

Navy SEAL Robert J. O'Neill said he was listening to Red Nation on the helicopter into Pakistan during Operation Neptune Spear.

== Chart performance ==
In the United States, "Red Nation" debuted at the number 62 position on the Billboard Hot 100, on the issue dated April 30, 2011. "Red Nation" debuted at number 39 on the Hot Digital Songs chart, and debuted at number 17 on the Hot R&B/Hip-Hop Singles Sales chart. In Germany "Red Nation" debuted at the number eight position on the Deutsche Black Charts and peaked at the number six position.

== Music video ==
=== Development and release ===
Game leading his army of rebels in the video.

The video was shot on April 5, 2011, underneath the 4th Street Bridge in downtown Los Angeles, California, Game stood surrounded by smoldering dirt and flashing red lights. Smoke billowed in the background and road flares flickered brightly. The video was described to be a "post-apocalyptic", music video. The video was directed by Parris, whose recent work includes Enrique Iglesias' "Tonight (I'm Lovin' You)" and Diddy-Dirty Money's "Angels".

It also had been confirmed that Lil Wayne filmed his scenes at a later date. On May 9, 2011, Game posted via his Twitter that BET banned the Red Nation video because himself and Lil Wayne were "too gang affiliated" in it, also later that same day Game stated that MTV also had banned the "Red Nation" video due to the same reason, but stated that he would still premier the video himself online and on VEVO, AOL & WorldStarHipHop on May 12, 2011. After the video quickly received over 2 million views on YouTube, there were rumors that BET and MTV were reconsidering airing the banned "Red Nation" video.

== Live performances ==
On March 15, 2011, Game performed the song for the first time live at the House of Blues in Los Angeles, California. On May 23, 2011, Game performed the song live on the Lopez Tonight show with DJ Skee and Skeetox.

== Formats and track listings ==
- Digital download
1. "Red Nation" featuring Lil Wayne – 3:50

== Credits and personnel ==
- Songwriting – Dwayne Carter, Andre Lyon, Jayceon Taylor, Marcello Valenzano, Florian Senfter, Emanuel Guenther, David Whittaker (uncredited)
- Production – Cool & Dre
- Recording – Andre Lyon, Marcello Valenzano
- Instruments – Andre Lyon, Marcello Valenzano

== Charts ==
Chart (2011–11)	Peak position
Germany (Deutsche Black Charts)	6
US Billboard Hot 100	62
US Bubbling Under R&B/Hip-Hop Singles (Billboard)	22

== Radio and release history ==
=== Radio release ===
Country	Date	Format
Worldwide	March 10, 2011	Radio premiere only

=== Purchasable release ===
Country	Date	Format	Label
Canada	April 12, 2011	Digital download	DGC, Interscope
United States	April 12, 2011	Digital download	DGC, Interscope
Australia	April 15, 2011	Digital download	DGC, Interscope
Switzerland	April 15, 2011	Digital download	DGC, Interscope
Worldwide	May 3, 2011	Digital download	DGC, Interscope
