= Do Ya Thang =

Do Ya Thang may refer to:

- "Do Ya Thang", 2008 song from Ice Cube's album Raw Footage
- "Do Ya Thing (featuring Young Dro)", song by Pimp Squad Click from their 2005 album 25 to Life
- "Do Ya Thang", song by Rihanna from the deluxe edition of the 2011 album Talk That Talk
- "DoYaThing", 2012 song by Gorillaz
- "Do Yo Thang", 2008 song by KJ-52
