= Zombielicious =

Studio album by Zombie Nation
- Released: 9 March 2009 (Germany)
- Recorded: 2008/2009 by Splank! at Zombie Studios in Munich, Germany
- Genre: Techno, Alternative dance, Electronic
- Label: UKW Records
- Producer: Florian Senfter

Zombie Nation chronology
Black Toys (2006)	Zombielicious (2009)

Professional ratings
Review scores
Source	Rating
MusicOMH	4.5/5 stars
URB	4/5 stars
XLR8R	7.5/10 stars
Harder Faster	8/10 stars

Zombielicious is the fourth studio album of Zombie Nation. It was written and produced by the German techno and electro DJ Florian Senfter. The artwork was designed by Designliga and features an outside Jewelcase screen print.

== Track listing ==
CD

1. Mas De Todo
2. Get It with My Robot Friend
3. Supercake 53
4. Radio Controlled
5. The Fact
6. Worth It Pt 1
7. Worth It Pt 2
8. Mystery Meat Affair
9. Shottieville
10. Filterjerks
11. Seas Of Grease
12. Stand By
13. Forza
14. Bass Kaput

Vinyl

1. A1 Mas De Todo
2. A2 The Fact
3. B1 Mystery Meat Affair
4. B2 Seas Of Grease
5. C1 Supercake 53
6. C2 Radio Controlled
7. D1 Shottieville
8. D2 Bass Kaput
9. D3 Get It

== Singles ==
- Forza (October 2008, UKW Records), remixes by Housmeister and Fukkk Offf
- Worth It (March 2009, UKW Records)
- Zombielicious remixed (June 2009, Turbo Records)
