= Maestro (producer) =

American hip hop record producer

- Born: Vaushaun Brooks; January 10, 1980 (age 46); Windsor, Connecticut, United States
- Origin: Atlanta, Georgia, United States
- Genres: Hip hop
- Occupations: Producer, Songwriter
- Instruments: Piano, Roland TR-808, Korg Triton
- Years active: 2002–present
- Labels: MaestroSound Music, Inc

Vaushaun Brooks (born January 10, 1980), professionally known as Maestro is an American Grammy Award-winning hip hop record producer and songwriter. Maestro's trademark is a synthesized female voice saying "Maestro" at the beginning of his productions. Maestro's sound is primarily sample-free, relying heavily on synthesizers or live instruments. Brooks graduated with honors from Morehouse College in 2002.

== Production credits ==
=== Daz Dillinger - Witit Witit ===
- "Come Thru" (feat. Sky Keeton)

=== The Game - The R.E.D. Album ===
- "Paramedics" (feat. Young Jeezy)

=== Mistah F.A.B. - I Found My Backpack 2: The Lost Notebook ===
- "Yearbook"

=== Boo Rossini ===
- "Whip It" (feat. Lil Wayne, Yo Gotti)

=== Aubrey O'Day feat Shanell ===
- "Party All the Time"

=== Lil Wayne - Tha Carter III ===
- "3 Peat"
- "Prostitute 2"
- "Kush"

=== Ice Cube - Raw Footage ===
- "Gangsta Rap Made Me Do It"
- "Gangsta Rap Made Me Do It Remix" (featuring Scarface, Nas)

=== Too Short - Blow the Whistle ===
- "Call Her A B****" (produced with Playa Poncho)

=== Clipse - Clipse Presents: Re-Up Gang ===
- "Zen"
- "Celebrate" (feat. Joss Stone)

=== Dem Franchize Boyz - Our World, Our Way ===
- "Itz A Go"
- "Put U On"
- "Whip It" featuring Lil' Wayne
- "Aint No Stoppin"
- "Choosin" co-produced with Parlae
- "DFB" co-produced with Parlae
- "Numba 1 Girl" featuring J Que

=== Chilli - Bi-Polar ===
- "AWW!"
- "Take You Away"
- "Wanna Be Yours"

=== Dem Franchize Boyz - On Top Of Our Game ===
- 05. "You Know What It Is"
- 09. "Give Props"
- 11. "Don't Play With Me" featuring Three 6 Mafia

=== Jibbs - Jibbs feat Jibbs ===
- 13. "Stuntin" (Import Bonus Track)

=== David Banner - Certified ===
- 04. "2 Fingers" featuring Jagged Edge (keyboards)
- 06. "Fucking" featuring Jazze Pha (keyboards)
- 09. "Certified" featuring Marcus (keyboards)
- 12. "Westside" Produced by Maestro
- 13. "I'll Take You Bitch" featuring Too Short, Bun B & Jazze Pha (keyboards)
- 16. "X-ed" featuring Kamikaze (keyboards)

=== 3LW - Point of No Return ===
- "Throwback"
- "Phone Sex"

=== Syndicato - Syndicato ===
- "305"

=== Bishop Paul S. Morton - Seasons Change ===
- Can You Come Today

=== Big Gipp ===
- "Hell on the Charm"

=== Parlae ===
- "I Whip Yae" (Feat. Lil Wayne)

=== Tash - Control Freek ===
- "Push The Button"

=== Lil Twist ===
- "Old Enough (Remix)" (Feat. Nicki Minaj)

=== Mack Maine - Freestyle 102: No Pens No Pads ===
- "Windows Half Down"

=== Yo Gotti - Cocaine Muzik 4.5 ===
- "Fishscale Dreams"

=== L.E.P. Bogus Boys - Don't Feed Tha Killaz 3 ===
- "DFK3 Intro" - co-prod. by Team Green
- "Darkness" - co-prod by FMG

=== Jim Jones (rapper) - Ghost of Rich Porter ===
- "Oh Yeah Intro" - feat. Hell Rell
- "Coke Rush"

=== Half Past Dead 2 ===
- "Break Her Off" - featuring Kurupt

=== Next Day Air ===
- "Get It How You Live" - featuring 5 Grand co-prod. by Siah

=== xXx: State of the Union ===
- "Wyle Out" - featuring Bone Crusher
- "Just Like Wylin'" - featuring Three Days Grace

=== The Longest Yard ===
- "Talkin' That Talk" by Chamillionaire featuring David Banner (keyboards)

=== Occupation: Hollywood ===
- "Side 2 Side" featuring D. Woods
- "Tho It Up"
- "I Like That"
- "Good Times"
- "Hoodstafied" featuring Kurupt
- "A MO Girl Is.."
- "One Night Stand"
- "If Only"
- "Train"
- "I'm Sorry"
- "Catchin' Feelings"
- "Access Hollywood"
- "Make My Move"

=== Midnight Club: Los Angeles ===
- "Gangsta Rap Made Me Do It"

== Awards and nominations ==
Year	Award	Album
2008	Grammy Award for Best Rap Album	Tha Carter III
2008	Grammy Nomination for Album of the Year	Tha Carter III
