= Gangsta Rap Made Me Do It =

Single by Ice Cube

from the album Raw Footage
- Released: January 3, 2008
- Recorded: 2007
- Genre: West Coast hip hop, gangsta rap, hardcore hip hop, political hip hop, comedy hip hop
- Length: 4:45
- Label: Lench Mob; EMI
- Songwriters: O'Shea Jackson, Vaushaun Brooks
- Producer: Vaushaun "Maestro" Brooks

Ice Cube singles chronology
"You Gotta Lotta That" (2007)	"Gangsta Rap Made Me Do It" (2008)	"Do Ya Thang" (2008)

"Gangsta Rap Made Me Do It" is the first single from Ice Cube's studio album, Raw Footage. It was released with a music video directed by Jonathan Silver. In the song, Ice Cube comments on the exploitation of gangsta rap as a scapegoat for society's problems.

A remix to the song was made featuring Nas and Scarface. The original song is featured on the soundtrack to the video game Midnight Club: Los Angeles.

== Music video ==
The video was directed by Jonathan Silver and begins in a classroom set in the year 2020 (12 years after the song's release). A teacher wearing a uniform, flanked by two American flags, condemns gangsta rap for the vices of society, rape, murder, etcetera. When a child asks if Compton was dangerous before the emergence of gangsta rap, the teacher yells, "Wrong! Compton was a nature preserve for bunny rabbits! When gangsta rap came along they tore down the country clubs and put up housing projects!" The room darkens and Ice Cube's face is projected on a screen smoking a cigar, rapping that gangsta rap is allegedly the root of all crimes. Several video clips of actual shootings in the U.S. and Iraq are shown, as well as the Virginia Tech Massacre including the infamous image of Seung-Hui Cho pointing a gun at the aforementioned massacre. It also features footage of the Michael Richards Laugh Factory incident (during the lyric "If I call you a nigga"), Don Imus ("If I call you a nappy-headed ho") and Chris Benoit (referring to the Benoit murder/suicide). The video features cameo appearances by WC and DJ Crazy Toones.

=== List of video clip images ===
- The 1997 North Hollywood Shootout (when Cube is talking about not needing to steal money) (1:12)
- 1992 Los Angeles riots (1:20)
- "Arson in the Southland" fire clip (when Cube is talking about how "hot" he is) (1:35)
- "False prophecy" clip with the image of Warren Jeffs (when Cube talks about him being Utah and having multiple bitches) (1:37)
- Oklahoma City bomber Timothy McVeigh being led away by police (1:50)
- Michael Richards incident at the Laugh Factory (when Cube is rapping the chorus) (1:53)
- Don Imus after his offensive statement. (1:55)
- Michael Vick prior to the dogfighting clip (1:59)
- Dogs fighting (when Cube is talking about acting like an animal) (2:01)
- Police brutality (2:15)
- Newspaper headline, "'Crack' Epidemic Linked to Contras" (2:45)
- Columbine High School cafeteria surveillance tape and sign (3:05)
- The Virginia Tech massacre (3:09)
- Abu Ghraib torture and prisoner abuse (3:17)
- R. Budd Dwyer's televised suicide (3:29)
- Televised suicide of Daniel V. Jones (3:30)
- A video of the welcome sign to Jena, Louisiana, home of the Jena Six(3:34)
- Scenes from the music video of It Was a Good Day (3:47)
- NBA player Ron Artest punching a Pistons' fan in 2004. (3:50)
- Oliver North testifying before the Iran-Contra hearings
- Polar ice caps melting (When saying "If I fuck up the planet.") (4:19)
- Chris Benoit vs. Chris Jericho in a ladder match for the WWF Intercontinental Championship at the 2001 Royal Rumble pay-per-view event. (4:33)
- Gameplay of Grand Theft Auto: San Andreas (which has Ice Cube on its soundtrack), Grand Theft Auto III and Halo (4:35)
- The infamous O. J. Simpson L.A Wide pursuit.(4:37)
- United Airlines Flight 175 crashing into the second tower of the World Trade Center (4:39)
- Oprah Winfrey (4:54)
