= Pot of Gold (The Game song) =

Single by The Game featuring Chris Brown

from the album The R.E.D. Album
- Released: June 28, 2011
- Recorded: 2010
- Genre: Hip hop
- Length: 3:25
- Label: DGC; Interscope
- Songwriters: Jayceon Taylor; Christopher Brown; Sam Hook; Joe Khajadourian; Alex Schwartz
- Producer: The Futuristics

The Game singles chronology
"Red Nation" (2011)	"Pot of Gold" (2011)	"Celebration" (2012)

Chris Brown singles chronology
"Next to You" (2011)	"Pot of Gold" (2011)	"Body 2 Body" (2011)

"Pot of Gold" is a song by American rapper The Game featuring American singer Chris Brown, released on June 28, 2011, as the second single from Game's fourth studio album The R.E.D. Album. The artists wrote the song alongside Sam Hook and producers The Futuristics.

The song features a sample of the song "Rocketship" by Guster. "Pot of Gold" was originally leaked back in early April, 2011 but was then fully remastered to a new version. Unlike the album's first single, the controversial and less successful "Red Nation", "Pot of Gold" managed to attain some Billboard and worldwide chart success.

== Background ==
Although confirmed that the album's second official single would be "Bottles & Rockin' J's" which is produced by Lex Luger, and features DJ Khaled, Busta Rhymes, Rick Ross, Fabolous and Lil Wayne, it was later changed. Later on June 22, 2011 it was confirmed that the album's new second official single would be "Pot of Gold", in which it features guest vocal performance from R&B singer Chris Brown.

"Pot of Gold" was written by Game, Chris Brown and Sam Hook a songwriter signed to R&B singer Ne-Yo's Compound Entertainment record label, and it was produced by Los Angeles–based production/writing duo The Futuristics, noted for working with many recording artists including Chris Brown, Ne-Yo, Lady Gaga and Justin Timberlake, among others.

The song features sample of the song "Rocketship" by Guster, which was originally released on their second album Goldfly (1997). Guster donated all the proceeds they would have received from the sample to a domestic violence shelter in Boston operated by the Crittenton Women's Union.

"Pot of Gold" was originally leaked back in early April 2011, but was then fully remastered to a new version.

== Critical reception ==
Scott Shetler of PopCrush gave the song a positive review, saying it's "A sensitive, introspective message from Game" and "Instead, simple guitar strumming and a gentle beat carry the song, making it a likely candidate to cross over and connect with pop audiences". Dean Silfen of AOL Radio also gave the song a positive review, saying "The chemistry between Brown and Game make this track a true hit. Brown plays the sentimental one, making the listener sympathize with the song's message, while Game gives the song its street sensibility".

== Music video ==
The video for the single was shot on June 28, 2011, filmed at an abandoned East Los Angeles residence, it is said that the Bryan Barber-directed clip is a retrospective of Game’s own life growing up in Compton, California. In one nostalgic scene, he raps in an attic with posters of Tupac Shakur and Snoop Dogg and N.W.A, reminiscing on simpler days. Chris Brown arrived later in the evening to shoot his scenes. The music video for the single was officially released on July 25, 2011.

== Formats and track listings ==
- Digital download
1. "Pot of Gold" featuring Chris Brown – 3:25

== Credits and personnel ==
The credits for "Pot of Gold" are adapted from the liner notes of The R.E.D. Album.

Recording

- Recorded at: Pacifque Studios in North Hollywood, Los Angeles.

Personnel

- The Game – songwriting, vocals
- Chris Brown – vocals
- The Futuristics – producers
- Samuel Kalandjian – recording
- Fabian Marasciullo – mixing
- Brian "Big Bass" Gardner – mastering
- Ryan Miller – songwriting
- Adam Gardner – songwriting
- Brian Rosenworcel – songwriting

== Chart performance ==
Chart (2011)	Peak position
Belgium (Ultratip Bubbling Under Flanders)	25
Netherlands (Dutch Top 40 Tipparade)	9
Switzerland (Schweizer Hitparade)	72
UK R&B (The Official Charts Company)	16
UK Singles (The Official Charts Company)	58
US Bubbling Under Hot 100 Singles (Billboard)	1
US Hot R&B/Hip-Hop Songs (Billboard)	53
US Rhythmic Airplay (Billboard)	28

== Radio and release history ==
=== Radio release ===
Country	Date	Format
United States	July 12, 2011	Rhythmic radio

=== Purchasable release ===
Country	Date	Format	Label
Worldwide	June 28, 2011	Digital download	DGC, Interscope
