= Fukkk Offf =

- Origin: Hamburg, Germany
- Genres: Electronic; dance; house; electro
- Labels: Citizen Records; Coco Machete Records; Skjoldmusic; Television Rocks
- Website: Facebook Profile

Fukkk Offf, born Bastian Heerhorst, is a German DJ and producer, whose song "Rave Is King" reached the top of German club charts. He has released one album, Love Me Hate Me Kiss Me Kill Me, under the Coco Machete Records record label. It debuted on 8 June 2009 and included his previous singles "Rave Is King" and "I'm a Freak."

His song "Bl00dfuck" was used in an advertisement for the British television program Skins. The single "Rave Is King" was also used several times in the 2014 movie Who Am I.

The songs "Bang Your Head" and "Pacific Coast Highway" are contained in the soundtrack of the Netflix series, The Umbrella Academy.

== Discography ==
=== Albums ===
Year	Title	Label
2009	Love Me Hate Me Kiss Me Kill Me: Released 8 June 2009	Coco Machete Records

=== Singles and EPs ===
Year	Title	Label
2007	"The Bottom" (12")	Hammarskjöld
2008	Rave Is King EP	Coco Machete Records
2009	"More Than Friends Remixes" (12")	Coco Machete Records
2009	"Love Me Hate Me Kiss Me Kill Me Remixes" (12")	Coco Machete Records
2009	"I Give You Bass" / "Bloodfuck" (12")	Citizen Records
2009	"Rave Is King Remixes Pt. 2" (12")	Coco Machete Records
2010	"Remix Is King" (12")	Coco Machete Records
2012	"Nuclear War Disaster" (Fukkk Offf & Dirty Disco Youth) (12")	Universal Germany
2012	"24/7 (NonStop)" (12")	Police Records / Modular Records
2012	"U.R. Techno" (12")	Police Records / Modular Records
2013	I Wanna House You EP	Bitclap! / Warner Music Group
2015	Keep it Raw EP	Bitclap! / Warner Music Group
2018	"Pacific Coast Highway"	Den Haku Records
2018	"Chicago"	Some Proof
2018	"Bang Your Head"	Den Haku Records
2019	"Chicago Remixes, Pt. 1"	Some Proof

=== Miscellaneous ===
Year	Title	Label
2007	I'm A Freak	Coco Machete Records
2008	Rave Is King Remixes	Coco Machete Records
	Maral Salmassi & Fukkk Offf - Let's Rock The Party	Television Rocks

== Credits ==
=== Remixes ===
Year	Title	Artist	Album	Label
2007	The Boy Who	Dance Inc.	The Boy Who	Audiolith
2007	The Boy Who (Fukkk Offf Remix)	Dance Inc.	The Boy Who	Audiolith
2008	Firegem (Fukkk Offf Remix)	Maral Salmassi	Firegem Remixes	Television Rocks
2008	Tight Jeans (Fukkk Offf Remix) (Dirty)	D'Secret Svc	Tight Jeans	Coco Machete Records
2008	Wet (Fukkk Offf Remix)	Gooseflesh	Wet EP	Freakz Me Out
2008	What Now	Various	Kisu Says Dance	Kisu Music
2008	What Now (Fukkk Offf Remix)	Lars Moston	What Now	Kisu Music
2008	Silver Grace (Fukkk Offf Remix)	Eriq Johnson	Silver Grace	Mylo Recordings
2008	Wet (Fukkk Offf Remix)	Gooseflesh	Wet EP / The Remixes	Freakz Me Out
2008	Sous Acides Club (Fukkk Offf Remix)	Suicide Club	Sous Acides Club	Dga Fau Records
2008	Forza (Fukkk Offf Remix)	Zombie Nation	Forza	UKW
2008	Tight Jeans (Fukkk Offf Remix)	D'Secret Svc	Tight Jeans	Coco Machete Records
2008	Tight Jeans (Fukkk Offf Dub)	D'Secret Svc	Tight Jeans	Coco Machete Records
2008	Cocked Locked Ready To Rock (Fukkk Offf Remix)	Monosurround	Cocked Locked Ready To Rock (Summerized)	Citizen Records
2009	Rechoque (Fukkk Offf Remix)	Shameboy	Rechoque Redux EP	Sputnik Records
2009	The Ease (Fukkk Offf Remix)	Moonbootica	The Ease	Moonbootique Records
2009	Oh Jonny (Fukkk Offf RMX)	Jan Delay	Oh Jonny	Buback, Indigo
2009	Everybody Got Young (Fukkk Offf Remix)	Popular Damage	The Royal Fly	Not On Label (Popular Damage Self-released)
2009	Pigeon Dance (Fukkk Offf Remix)	Leopold Gregori	Pigeon Dance	Tasted Music
2009	Cocked, Locked, Ready To Rock (Fukkk Offf Remix)	Various	RMXS	Citizen Records, Module Records
2009	Everybody Got Young (Fukkk Offf Remix)	Popular Damage	The Royal Fly	Not On Label (Popular Damage)
2009	On The Road (Fukkk Off Remix) (as Fukkk Off)	Midfield General Ft. Robots In Disguise	On the Road	Skint Records
2009	Fight Club (Fukkk Offf Remix)	Electro Ferris	Fight Club	Freakz Me Out
2009	Mitch (Fukkk Offf Remix)	AcidKids	Mitch	Acid Kids Records
2009	Tight Jeans (Fukkk Offf Remix)	Various	Top of the Clubs Volume 44	Kontor Records
2009	Drama (Fukkk Offf Remix)	Sc'nDl	Drama	Coco Machete Records
2009	Captain Funk (Fukkk Off Remix)	Stereofunk	Captain Funk	Moonbootique Records
2009	Urlaub Im Süden (Fukkk Offf Remix)	Decalicious	Urlaub Im Süden	Kisu Music
2010	Ich Tu Dir Weh (Remix By F*kkk Offf) (as F*kkk Offf)	Rammstein	Ich Tu Dir Weh	Universal Music
2010	Need To Know' (Fukkk Offf Edit)	Scndl	Need To Know	Coco Machete Records
2010	Krosscut (Fukkk Offf Rmx)	Donovans	Freakshow - Krosscut	Citizen Records
2010	Brains Off (Fukkk Offf Remix)	Dirty Disco Youth	Off	Dim Mak Records
2010	Andere Leute (Fukkk Offf Remix)	Various	Ich Bin Ein Berliner	Araknid Records
2010	On The Road (Fukkk Off Remix) (as Fukkk Off)	Various	Skint Hidden Gems Vol 1	Skint Records
2011	Entertain Me	Various	Club Oddstream	Shipwrec
2011	Entertain Me (Fukkk Offf Remix)	T.Raumschmiere	The Rave Is On	Shitkatapult
2012	Metropolis (Fukkk Offf Remix)	The Sexinvaders	Metropolis EP	Pink-Pong Records
2012	I Love It (Fukkk Offf Remix)	Icona Pop	I Love It (Remixes Part 2)	Big Beat Records

=== Production ===
Year	Title	Artist	Album	Label
2009	--	Love Me Hate Me Kiss Me Kill Me	Fukkk Offf	Coco Machete Records
2009	Mitch (Fukkk Offf Remix)	AcidKids	Mitch	Acid Kids Records
2009	Captain Funk (Fukkk Off Remix) (as Fukkk Offf / Bastian Heerhorst)	Stereofunk	Captain Funk	Moonbootique Records
2010	Ich tu dir weh (Remix By F*kkk Offf) (as F*kkk Offf)	Rammstein	Ich tu dir weh	Universal Music
2010	--	Pulpalicious	Dirty	Level 75
2010	Need To Know (Fukkk Offf Edit)	Scndl	Need To Know	Coco Machete Records
