= Raw Footage =

Studio album by Ice Cube
- Released: August 19, 2008
- Recorded: 2007–08
- Genres: West Coast hip-hop; gangsta rap; political hip-hop
- Length: 64:34
- Label: Lench Mob
- Producers: DizMIX; DJ Crazy Toones; P-No; DJ Felli Fel; DJay Cas; Emile; EmBeatz; Maestro; Palumbo Beats; Scott Storch; Swizz Beatz; tha Bizness; Warren "Baby Dubb" Campbell; Symphony; Hallway Productionz; Young Fokus; John Murphy

Ice Cube chronology
Laugh Now, Cry Later (2006)	Raw Footage (2008)	I Am the West (2010)

Singles from Raw Footage
- 1. "Gangsta Rap Made Me Do It" Released: January 3, 2008; 2. "Do Ya Thang" Released: July 1, 2008; 3. "Why Me?" Released: September 24, 2008

Raw Footage is the eighth studio album by American rapper Ice Cube. It was released on August 19, 2008, by his record label Lench Mob Records. The album features guest appearances from The Game, Butch Cassidy, Musiq Soulchild, Young Jeezy and WC. The album is his most political effort, since over a decade earlier with the release of his album The Predator (1992).

Preceding the release, supported by three singles; "Gangsta Rap Made Me Do It", "Do Ya Thang", and "Why Me?" featuring Musiq Soulchild.

== Singles ==
The lead single from the album, called "Gangsta Rap Made Me Do It" was released on January 3, 2008. The song was produced by Maestro. In this single, Ice Cube addresses society's view of gangsta rap music, which has sometimes been blamed for criminality in America. On February 12, 2008, the single became available via iTunes. The music video features cameo appearances by WC and DJ Crazy Toones.

The album's second single, called "Do Ya Thang" was released through the iTunes on June 24, 2008. The song was produced by Palumbo Beats.

The music video for the third single, "Why Me?" featuring Musiq Soulchild, premiered on BET's 106 & Park on September 24, 2008.

=== Other songs ===
The song "It Takes a Nation" was released via iTunes Store on May 27, 2008. It was never officially released as a single.

== Critical reception ==
Professional ratings
Aggregate scores
Source	Rating
Metacritic	67/100
Review scores
Source	Rating
About	4/5 stars
AllHipHop	8/10
AllMusic	3.5/5 stars
ChartAttack	4/5 stars
Robert Christgau	(3-star Honorable Mention)
HipHopDX	4/5 stars
RapReviews	8.5/10
Rolling Stone	3.5/5 stars
The Source	4/5 stars
XXL	(favorable)

Robert Christgau said that the album contains "Some of the smartest raps of his career" and "some of the easiest beats."

== Commercial performance ==
Raw Footage debuted at number five on the US Billboard 200, selling 70,000 copies in its first week. This became Ice Cube's seventh US top-ten album.

== Track listing ==
No.	Title	Writer(s)	Producer(s)	Length
1.	"What Is a Pyroclastic Flow?"		John Murphy	0:54
2.	"I Got My Locs On" (featuring Young Jeezy)	O'Shea Jackson; Jay Jenkins; Delarmon "P-No" Harold	P-No	3:43
3.	"It Takes a Nation"	Jackson; Emile Haynie	Emile	3:26
4.	"Gangsta Rap Made Me Do It"	Jackson; Vaushaun Brooks	Maestro	4:41
5.	"Hood Mentality"	Jackson; Deejon Underdue; Teak Underdue; Hal Davis; Herman Griffith	Hallway Productionz	5:11
6.	"Why Me?" (featuring Musiq Soulchild)	Jackson; Talib Johnson; D. Underdue; T. Underdue	Hallway Productionz	4:00
7.	"Cold Places"	Jackson; D. Underdue; T. Underdue	Hallway Productionz	4:12
8.	"Jack n the Box"	Jackson; Chris Whitacre; Justin Henderson	Tha Bizness	4:22
9.	"Do Ya Thang"	Jackson; M. Palumbo	Palumbo Beats	4:04
10.	"Thank God"	Jackson; D. Underdue; T. Underdue; Barry White; Bob Relf; Tom Brocker	Hallway Productionz	5:28
11.	"Here He Come" (featuring O'Shea Jackson Jr.)	Jackson; Darrell Finister II; Gene Griffin	Symphony	4:32
12.	"Get Money, Spend Money, No Money"	Jackson; Haynie	Emile	4:07
13.	"Get Used to It" (featuring WC and The Game)	Jackson; William Calhoun; Jayceon Taylor; Augustine "EmBeatz" Sumo/BeatMafia	EmBeatz	4:25
14.	"Tomorrow"	Jackson; Warryn "Baby Dubb" Campbell	Campbell	3:40
15.	"Stand Tall"	Jackson; Lamar Calhoun; David "DizMIX" Lopez; William DeVaughn	DJ Crazy Toones; DizMIX	3:46
16.	"Take Me Away" (featuring Butch Cassidy)	Jackson; Butch Cassidy	Young Fokus; DJay Cas	4:03

iTunes bonus track
No.	Title	Writer(s)	Producer(s)	Length
17.	"Believe It or Not"	Jackson; Haynie	Emile	3:11

Best Buy pre-order bonus tracks
No.	Title	Writer(s)	Producer(s)	Length
17.	"Don't Make Me Hurt Ya Feelings"	Jackson; Kasseem Dean	Swizz Beatz	2:47
18.	"Crack Baby?"	Jackson; James Reigart	DJ Felli Fel	2:59
19.	"Why We Thugs" (Live)(featuring WC)	Jackson; W. Calhoun; Scott Storch	Storch	3:37

Notes

- "What Is a Pyroclastic Flow?", "Hood Mentality", "Jack n the Box", "Get Used to It" and "Take Me Away" feature voice over by Keith David.
- "Cold Places" is also featured on Ice Cube's greatest hits album The Essentials.

Sample credits

- "Hood Mentality" contains a sample of "Can I" performed by Eddie Kendricks.
- "Thank God" contains a samples of "If We Don't Make It, Nobody Can" performed by Tom Brocker (written by Barry White, Bob Relf and Tom Brocker).
- "Stand Tall" contains a sample of "Be Thankful for What You Got", written and performed by William DeVaughn.

== Charts ==
=== Weekly charts ===
Chart (2008)	Peak position
Australian Albums (ARIA)	58
Belgian Albums (Ultratop Flanders)	96
Canadian Albums (Billboard)	14
Swiss Albums (Schweizer Hitparade)	53
US Billboard 200	5
US Top R&B/Hip-Hop Albums (Billboard)	1
US Top Rap Albums (Billboard)	1

=== Year-end charts ===
Chart (2008)	Position
US Top R&B/Hip-Hop Albums (Billboard)	62
