= Love Me Hate Me Kiss Me Kill Me =

Studio album by Fukkk Offf
- Released: June 8, 2009
- Recorded: 2009
- Genre: Electro, electro house, acid house, indie dance
- Length: 1:13:54
- Label: Coco Machete Records

Love Me Hate Me Kiss Me Kill Me is the first album by artist Fukkk Offf, released on June 8, 2009, by Coco Machete Records.

== Track listing ==
No.	Title	Length
1.	"Love Me Hate Me Kiss Me Kill Me"	6:22
2.	"More Than Friends"	6:22
3.	"Rave Is King"	6:33
4.	"Love My Shake"	6:50
5.	"I Give You Bass"	7:00
6.	"The Bottom"	4:24
7.	"Bloodfuck"	5:34
8.	"I'm A Freak"	6:38
9.	"Black Phantom"	4:58
10.	"Famous"	4:59
11.	"Rock, Paper, Scissors"	5:48
12.	"Pretend"	3:44
13.	"Bad Boy"	4:46
