= Monosurround =

Electronic music and live-act performers from Berlin

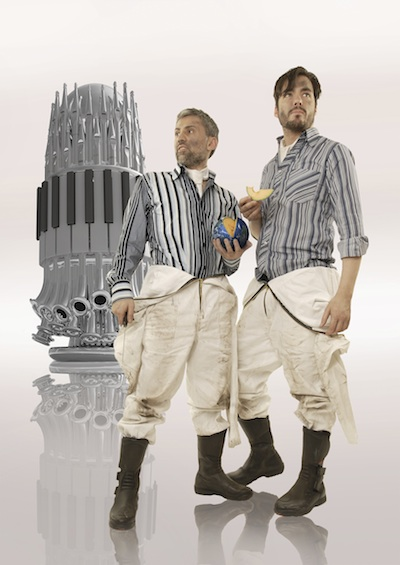
- Monosurround

Background information
- Origin: Berlin, Germany
- Genres: Maximalism, electro-industrial, house, techno, electro, funk, synthpop
- Years active: 1999-present
- Labels: Superstar Records (2002), Citizen Records (2002-2005), Moonbootique Records (2005), Citizen Records (2006-2009), MS Recordings (2007-present)
- Members: Erik Schaeffer, Ramtin Asadolahzadeh
- Website: http://www.monosurround.com

Monosurround is a Berlin-based electronic music and live-act duo, formed in 1999. It is made up of Erik Schaeffer and Ramtin Asadolahzadeh. Since 2002, they have released EPs and albums in France, Germany, and Japan on Vitalic's record label Citizen Records. In 2010 they started their own record label called "MS Records" as a platform for their music and the concept behind their "Maximalism".

== History ==
Ramtin Asadolahzadeh and Erik Schaeffer were introduced in Berlin in 1999. They started to work together in the same month. Their first joint project was the composition and co-production of music for the German cinema-releases Ants in the Pants (2000) and Bundle of Joy (2000).

Combining their respective music influences, in the summer of 2001 Monossurround moved towards composing electronic music. Their first release in the same year “I warned you baby” was an immediate success, becoming the official festival anthem SonneMondSterne Festival 2002 in Saalburg, Thuringia. The track samples the American jazz singer Spanky Wilson.

Through the success of “I warned you baby” connections arose between Monosurround and their peers. They remixed many artists including Sono, Phil Fuldner, Da Hool, TISM Northern Lite and Glamour to Kill. They were simultaneously remixed by artists, including The Gigler, Shir Khan, The Raccoon Brothers, DJ SPUD and Malente.

At that time, parallel to regular live performances, Monosurround started working on their first studio album, Hello World. In 2004 the duo stopped performing live in order to concentrate their energies on the development and production of the album.

The EP Borschtchick was released in Germany in 2005 through Moonbootique Records owned by Moonbootica. In January 2006 the Cocked, Locked EP was released on techno DJ Vitalic's record label Citizen Records in France. This EP includes the tracks “Borschtchick” and “Cocked, Locked and Ready to Rock”.

Having successfully released these EPs into the French market in 2006 and 2007, Monosurround played live again alongside acts such as Vitalic and The Hacker.

The album Hello World was released across different countries at the end of 2008: France in September, Germany in November, and Japan in December.

== Style ==
The Monosurround sound has changed greatly since its formation in 1999. Azadolahzadeh and Schaeffer come from different musical backgrounds: 1960s and 1970s soul funk, and techno and classical music respectively. Their first two years together saw performances including up to nine instrumentalists on stage playing 1960s crossover big beat.

In 2001 a notable change in their sound occurred. Azadolahzadeh and Schaeffer moved towards electronic music in their composition, bringing their sound closer to electronic dance music and techno.

The major stylistic turning point came in 2003 with the creation of their track “We”. The signature sound from this point onwards combined epic vocal/choral textures with hard industrial noises. These features of the music bear comparison to the Justice (French band) sound which arose at the same time.

From this point onwards Azadolahzadeh and Schaeffer worked under the self-imposed description “maximalism”. This theme motivates their music, artwork, and philosophy behind their work.

== Festival appearances ==
Through their relationship with Citizen Records, Monosurround have played alongside Vitalic and The Hacker at Les Plagess festival in France, 2006 and 2007. This tour with Vitalic continued on to Barcelona to play the Razzmatazz complex in 2007. Their last big festival appearance was Sónar festival 2008, playing alongside The Hacker.

== Trivia ==
Early in 2008, the bottled mineral water brand Perrier used the track “Cocked, Locked, and Ready to Rock” in a TV advertising campaign in Germany. Since early 2010 Monosurround release their music on their own label MS Records. MS Records dedicated its work to release and spread maximalistic music.

== Discography ==
Albums
2007 Early Days (Layb - Berlin Artists)
2008 Hello World (Citizen Records)
2010 Hello World (MS Records)

Maxis and EPs
2002 I Warned You Baby (1st Decade Records)
2002 I Warned You Baby - Remixes (Superstar Records)
2002 I Warned You Baby (Superstar Records)
2003 Creepy Guys EP (1st Decade Records)
2003 Bo Bullet mini EP (1st Decade Records)
2003 Bo Bullet EP (1st Decade Records)
2004 We EP (1st Decade Records)
2005 Borschtchick (Moonboutique Records)
2006 Cocked Locked EP (Citizens Records)
2006 Cocked, Locked, Reading to Rock (Hammarskjöld)
2008 Cocked, Locked Ready to Rock – Summarized (Citizen Records)
2010 Hello World [Remixed] (MS Records)
2010 "All Night Long" (MS Records)
2011 "REworks" (MS Records)

Remixes
2002 TISM - Defecate On My Face (TISM)
2002 Neonman - Future Is Pussy (1st Decade Records)
2003 Northern Lite - MyPain (1st Decade Records)
2003 Sono - Heading For (Island Zeitgeist Records)
2003 Phil Fuldner - Never Too Late (Kosmo Records)
2004 Glamour To Kill - Shake Your Body, Baby (Pale Records)
2005 Da Hool feat. Jackie Bredie - Bow Down (Kosmo Records)
2006 Electrixx - SecondLesson (Hadshot Haheizar)
2007 ProCon - Delia (Cochon Records)
2008 Mokkasin - Elazerhead (LeGrain Records)
2009 Depeche Mode - Peace
2010 Music To Drive Tanks To - Granite Eyes
2010 Mujik - Arma Mortal
2011 Nixu Zsun - Exploring Bulgaria
