= Nat Powers =

British musician (born 1986)

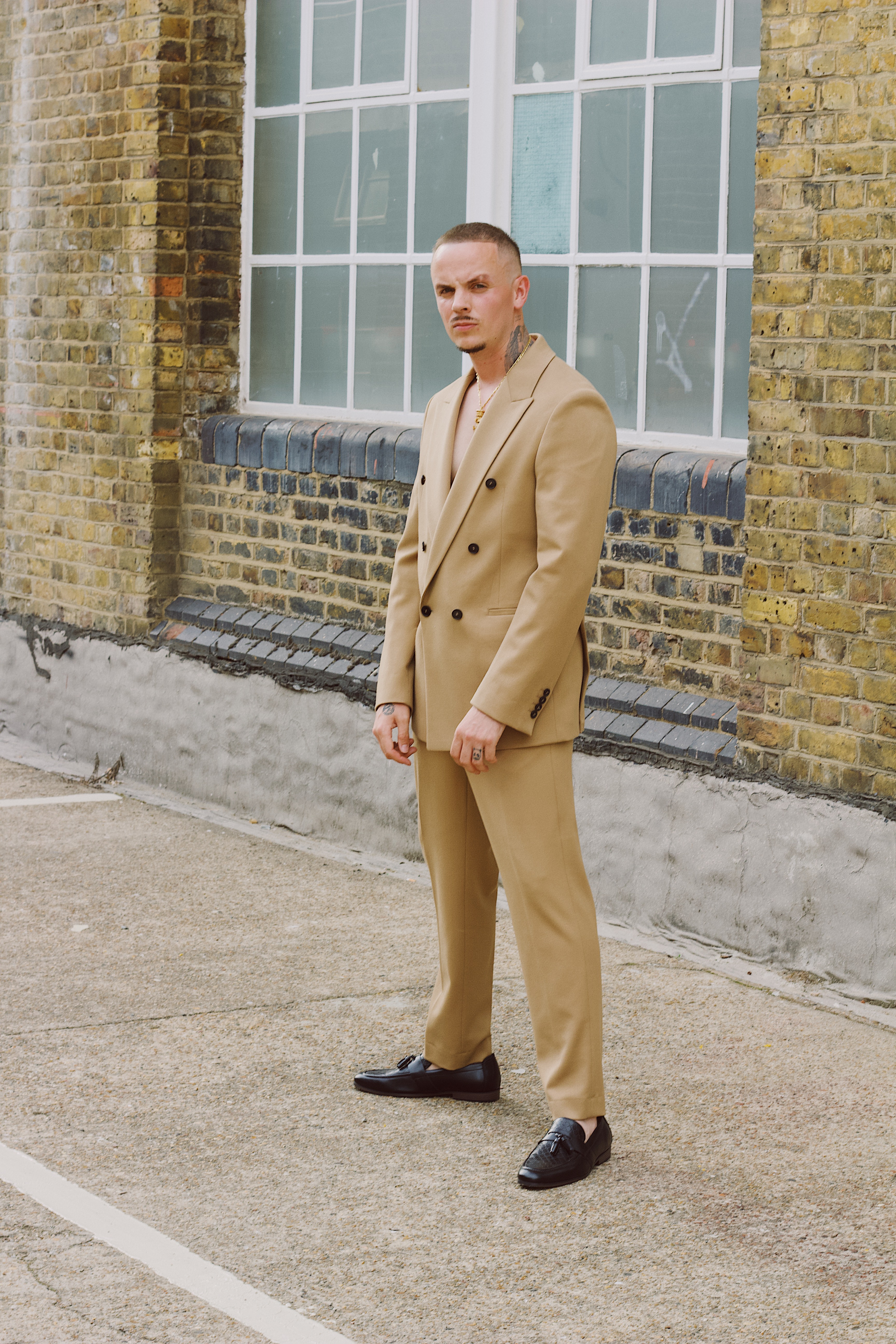
- Nat Powers, East London, 2020

Background information
- Also known as: Mr Powers
- Born: Nathaniel Powers; 4 June 1986 (age 40)
- Origin: Leicester, England
- Genres: Hip hop, rap, grime, soul, R&B, Motown, Neo soul
- Occupations: Songwriter, Record producer, Composer, Lyricist, Poet
- Instruments: Vocals, Drums, Akai MPC, Keyboards, SSL Board
- Years active: 1999–present
- Website: www.nat-powers.com

Nat Powers Signature

Nat Powers (born Nathaniel Powers on 4 June 1986) is a British record producer and song writer from Leicester who has worked with hip-hop figures such as Darryl McDaniels of Run DMC, Spice One and with a majority of the Death Row Records roster. He was mentored by multi-platinum rapper and producer Sam Sneed. He has also been co-mentored by musician Leroy Burgess of the 1970s R&B group Black Ivory, who himself was mentored by Stevie Wonder when he was rising to fame.

== Early years ==
Nathaniel Powers enrolled in a local college course in 2003 and studied Music Technology, going on to graduate with a bachelor's degree in Music, Technology and Innovation. During his university studies he began working with orchestras and choirs as a conductor, choir director and film scorer, before going on to establish himself as a record producer.

== Doctor's Note ==
In 2010, he began close a working relationship with the son of Dr. Dre, Curtis Young. Together they created an album, titled Doctor's Note with Young providing the vocals and Powers on the production. The album had a worldwide release in September 2012.

== Explosion incident ==
On 31 August 2011, Nat Powers narrowly escaped being killed in an explosion that tore apart a kebab shop. A body was discovered in the wreckage by firefighters, and was later identified as employee Fiaz Ahmed Ansari. Six people – two men and four women were arrested by police shortly after the explosion, and in September 2012 two of the suspects were found guilty of manslaughter and jailed for eight years each. Nat Powers described seeing a flame ball shoot out and the metal shutters "flying across the road" to local media in a TV interview, and remarked that to avoid something as devastating as that, "someone was most certainly watching over them".

== Career ==
=== 2012-2013 ===
In late 2012 he began working with British Grime artist D Double E, Maxi Priest and produced more than half of an album for West Coast rapper Spice One. Other collaborations he has made include Yukmouth of Luniz, Three 6 Mafia, CJ Mac, The Manhattans, RBX, Akil the MC of Jurassic 5, Slip Capone, Danny Boy (singer) and Run Dmc.

In February 2013, he produced the official remix of "Fire Blaze" by British urban group The Rascals, featuring Professor Green, released on EMI/Virgin Records. In the summer of 2013, he began working on new material for Ghostface Killah, as well as a collaboration with Young Dirty Bastard, first born son of the late Ol' Dirty Bastard. During the autumn of 2013, he began extensive work on an album for The Pharcyde.

After not performing live for over 10 years whilst concentrating on his production career, Powers returned as a performing artist in late 2013, holding a concert in Paris in La Bellevilloise, followed by another at Le Petit-Bain on the Seine river.

=== 2014 ===
In February 2014, Powers announced the release of his debut solo single, titled "Napoleon Bonaparte". The single and official video were released on 25 March 2014.

After an eight-month break from music, and a two-month visit to Malawi, Powers returned to his career by producing a new single titled "Lovely Jubbly" for UK Grime artist D Double E. The song received a worldwide premiere on MistaJam's show on BBC Radio 1 and BBC Radio 1xtra on 4 October 2014. On 15 October 2014, the official video for "Lovely Jubbly" was released by Noisey and Vice. The video stars D Double E as a cockney mobster turned debt collector, with Powers co-starring as his 'right-hand man' and driver.

=== 2016 ===
On 26 February 2016, Footsie of the Newham Generals and Giggs released their single "Hot Water" which was produced by Powers. The single was released on Footsie's own Braindead Entertainment, and was heavily supported by Radio DJ Charlie Sloth and BBC Radio 1.

Powers began actively working in the South African music industry, starting by working with platinum recording artist Lira when he produced "Let Go Sometimes" for her 2016 album Born Free; released on 25 March 2016. He continued his efforts in the South Africa territory by producing controversial single "The Man" for female rapper Nadia Nakai, released on 19 August 2016 on Independent label Family Tree Entertainment. The single also features the label's CEO and mainstream rapper Cassper Nyovest.

=== 2018 ===
In June 2018, Pay As You Go crew member Maxwell D released his single "Grimey Stuff", produced by Powers and featuring Tanya Cracknell (aka The Grime Violinist). The video premiered on SBTV on 21 June 2018.

=== 2020 ===
In September 2020, Powers produced a single for Grime icon D Double E featuring Kano titled "Tell Me a Ting". Shortly after, an official remix was released featuring rappers P Money, Frisco (rapper), Backroad Gee, and Novelist.
