= Zombie Nation (musician) =

German musician

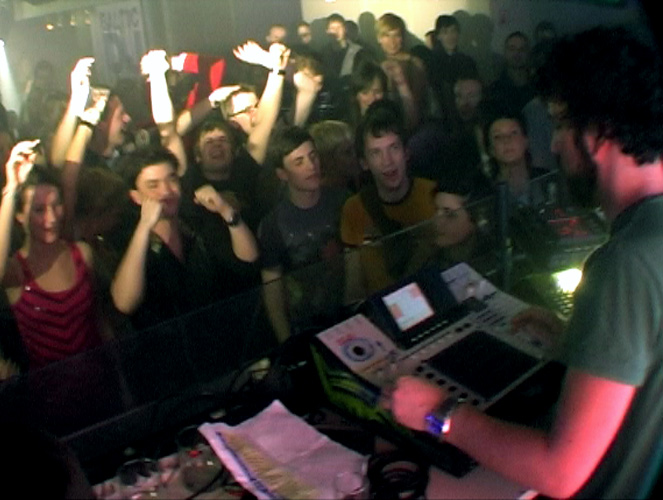
- Zombie Nation in Vilnius, Lithuania, February 2008

Background information
- Also known as: John Starlight
- Born: Florian Senfter; 1974 (age 51–52)
- Origin: Munich, Germany
- Genres: Techno, tech house, bitpop, chiptune
- Years active: 1998–present
- Labels: Gigolo Records (1999–2003); Dekathlon Records (2003–2006); UKW Records (2006–present); Turbo Recordings (2007–present)
- Member of: ZZT
- Members: Florian Senfter a.k.a. Splank!
- Past members: Emanuel Günther (a.k.a. Mooner) (1998–2000)
- Website: Official Website

Zombie Nation is the project of German DJ and producer Florian Senfter. Zombie Nation's single "Kernkraft 400" was a worldwide hit.

== History ==
The first Zombie Nation EP was released in the spring of 1999 on DJ Hell's label, International DeeJay Gigolo Records. A remix of the song "Kernkraft 400" on this debut release reached high chart positions all over the world, including number 2 in the United Kingdom.

Since 2001, Florian Senfter has released tracks on different labels under Zombie Nation and his other pseudonym John Starlight. In 2002, he did not renew his contract with International DeeJay Gigolo Records and started his own label, Dekathlon Records, where he released his second album "Absorber" in 2003. In early 2005, the new sublabel UKW Records was launched with John Starlight's John's Addiction Part 1 followed by Paeng Paeng 12" by Zombie Nation which was recorded a few months later. Sven Väth realized the potential of the song at first glance and licensed it for his Cocoon Recordings imprint.

The third album Black Toys which was released in 2006 on UKW Records Zombie Nation is a bass dominated soundscape from tech-hop to funk-laden house.

In 2007, Zombie Nation collaborated with Tiga under the pseudonym ZZT on the recording "Lower State of Consciousness".

Zombie Nation is also known today as an electronic music live act. Unusually for a DJ, he uses musical hardware on stage to create sounds. The main instrument is an Akai MPC 4000 Music sequencer which he uses in combination with a mixing console and several effects units to do a live arrangement and Mix of his music.

In December 2009 and January 2010, Zombie Nation created an orchestrated track, and Florian tells the story like so:

One cold day in December I had a brainwave. An idea for internet democratic music, made as a collaboration with my boys and girls on Facebook and Twitter. If you're reading this you probably already know that it is my declared passion to mash samples together on my MPC, so the logical first step was to issue the callout: "send me your sounds!"

In the week that followed, my dropbox was inundated with whistles, basses and burps. The next step was to split the sounds into categories and present them in 10 polls, and then open the voting up to the world. I created loops from the most popular sounds, and then opened them up to another popularity contest. The people spoke, once again, and chose their favourite five loops. In the following weeks, between sessions taking my beloved MPC all over the world, I worked out an arrangement. A song! Part of this work was done streaming video from the studio, with about three hundred people watching and contributing to the decision making process. After a final round of feedback on the arrangement through SoundCloud, the song was finalised. Tada! The last step was to make the parts available to the public, so anyone could have a bash and submit a remix. We selected the six most interesting and unique remixes, and included them in the package. Now only one thing was missing – a name! This was one element of the project that was beyond the capabilities of online democracy. The polling system hit its technical limits. So I decided to discuss the name with my new studio buddies, the people behind the original sounds submitted! And then at last, we had reached the end of the road.

This project was not an attempt to make a logical song, a marketable piece of music, or even one that would appeal to most. Rather, the idea was to produce a democratic piece of music; one in which anyone could take part, and influence the outcome. And I am happy to say that it worked out great!.

— Florian Senfter

The result was a track by "Zombie Nation and Friends" titled "The Mind of Many".

== Discography ==
=== Albums ===
- 1999 – Leichenschmaus (Gigolo 028)
- 2003 – Absorber (Dekathlon 010)
- 2006 – Black Toys (UKW 5)
- 2009 – Zombielicious (UKW 12)
- 2011 – Partys Over Earth as ZZT with Tiga (Turbo 033)
- 2012 – RGB (Turbo 036)

=== Singles/EPs ===
- 1999 – "Kernkraft 400"
- 2001 – Kernkraft 400 (Gigolo 019)
- 2001 – Unload (Gigolo 082)
- 2003 – Souls at Zero, 12" (+ Sven Väth Remix) (Dekathlon 009)
- 2003 – The Cut, 12" + DJ Naughty Remix (Dekathlon 012)
- 2005 – Paeng Paeng, 12" (UKW-2 // ltd. 500)
- 2005 – Paeng Paeng + Meatmaster Jack, 12" (Cocoon Records 17)
- 2006 – Money Talks, 12" (UKW 3)
- 2007 – Gizmode, 12" (UKW 8)
- 2007 – Lower State of Consciousness, 12" (UKW/Turbo) as ZZT with Tiga including Justice Remix.
- 2008 – The Worm, 12" (UKW/Turbo) as ZZT with Tiga including Erol Alkan Remix.
- 2008 – Forza, 12", remixes by Fukkk Offf and Housemeister (UKW 10)
- 2009 – Worth It, 12" (UKW 11)
- 2010 – Overshoot / Squeek, 12", remixes by DJ Mehdi and Bart B More (UKW 13)
- 2010 – ZZafrika as ZZT with Tiga
- 2011 – Chickflick, 12", remixes by Boris Dlugosch and Siriusmo (UKW 14)
- 2011 – Vulkan Alarm!, 12", as ZZT with Tiga (Turbo 109)
- 2011 – Tight single, with a remix by Étienne de Crécy
- 2011 – Partys over Los Angeles, as ZZT with Tiga
- 2012 – Meathead EP (Turbo 133)
- 2013 – Fishtank / Guzzler (UKW 017)
- 2014 – Gnork (UKW 019)
- 2014 – TGV (UKW 019)
- 2015 – A Night at the Zoo (UKW 021)
- 2016 – Something Else (Twin Turbo 036)
- 2017 – Knockout (UKW 022)
- 2017 – Worldwise (UKW 023)
- 2018 – Ticket (GPM442)
- 2026 – "Kernkraft 400" (Apocalyptic Mix) ft. vocal-poem So Get Up by Ithaka

=== Charted singles ===
List of singles, with selected chart positions and certifications, showing year released and album name
Title	Year	Peak chart positions								Certifications	Album
Title	Year	GER	BEL (FL)	FRA	IRE	NL	UK	US	US Dance	Certifications	Album
"Kernkraft 400"	1999	22	10	100	2	5	2	99	47	BPI: Platinum	Leichenschmaus

=== Remixes ===
- 1999 Dakkar & Grinser – "Take me naked" (DiskoB 087)
- 1999 Philip Boa and the Voodoclub – "So What" (BMG Ariola)
- 1999 Sexual Harassment – "I Need a Freak" (Lasergun Rec.Lasergun 003)
- 1999 Frankie Bones – "My house is your house" (Bash Rec. bash 004)
- 2001 Takkyū Ishino – "Suck me Disko" (Zomba Rec. EXEC 08)
- 2001 I-F – "Space Invaders are smoking grass" (Loaded/Eastwest Leaded 012)
- 2001 Ladytron – "Playgirl" (Labels/Virgin LC03098)
- 2002 Colonel Abrams;– "Trapped" (eastwest UPUS011.03)
- 2002 Divine;– "Native Love" (Gigolo/EDM 090)
- 2002 AFA / Human League – "Being Boiled" (Edel 0141690CLU)
- 2002 My Robot Friend – "The Fake" (Dekathlon 002)
- 2002 Gater – "Taboo" (Dekathlon 003)
- 2002 Acid Scout – "Sexy Robot" (Kurbel 027)
- 2003 My Robot Friend – "Walt Whitman" (Dekathlon 008)
- 2004 NAM:LIVE – "The Church of NAM" (Dekathlon 013)
- 2004 Codec & Flexor – "Time has changed" (Television 08)
- 2007 Headman – "On" (Relish)
- 2008 The Presets – "This Boy´s in Love" Modular
- 2008 Three 6 Mafia – "I Got"
- 2009 Adam Freeland – "Under Control" (Marine Parade)
- 2009 Kid Sister – "Get Fresh" (Fools Gold)
- 2009 Tiga – "What You Need" (Turbo Records)
- 2012 Housemeister – Clarisse (Boysnoize BNR077D)
- 2017 DJ Pierre – Strobe Light Laser Acid (Get Physical)
