= Do Ya Thang (Ice Cube song) =

Single by Ice Cube

from the album Raw Footage
- Released: July 1, 2008
- Recorded: 2007–08
- Genre: West Coast hip hop
- Length: 4:04
- Label: Lench Mob; EMI
- Songwriters: O'Shea Jackson, M. Palumbo
- Producer: Palumbo Beats

Ice Cube singles chronology
"Gangsta Rap Made Me Do It" (2008)	"Do Ya Thang" (2008)	"Why Me?" (2008)

"Do Ya Thang" is the second single from Ice Cube's eighth solo studio album, Raw Footage released August 19. It was released with a music video on his website on July 1, 2008.

== Release ==
Do Ya Thang was released onto iTunes on June 24, 2008. The video has had over 8 million YouTube views.

== Charts ==
Chart (2008)	Peak position
U.S. Billboard Bubbling Under Hot 100 Singles	15
U.S. Billboard Rhythmic Top 40	3
