= Jeezy discography =

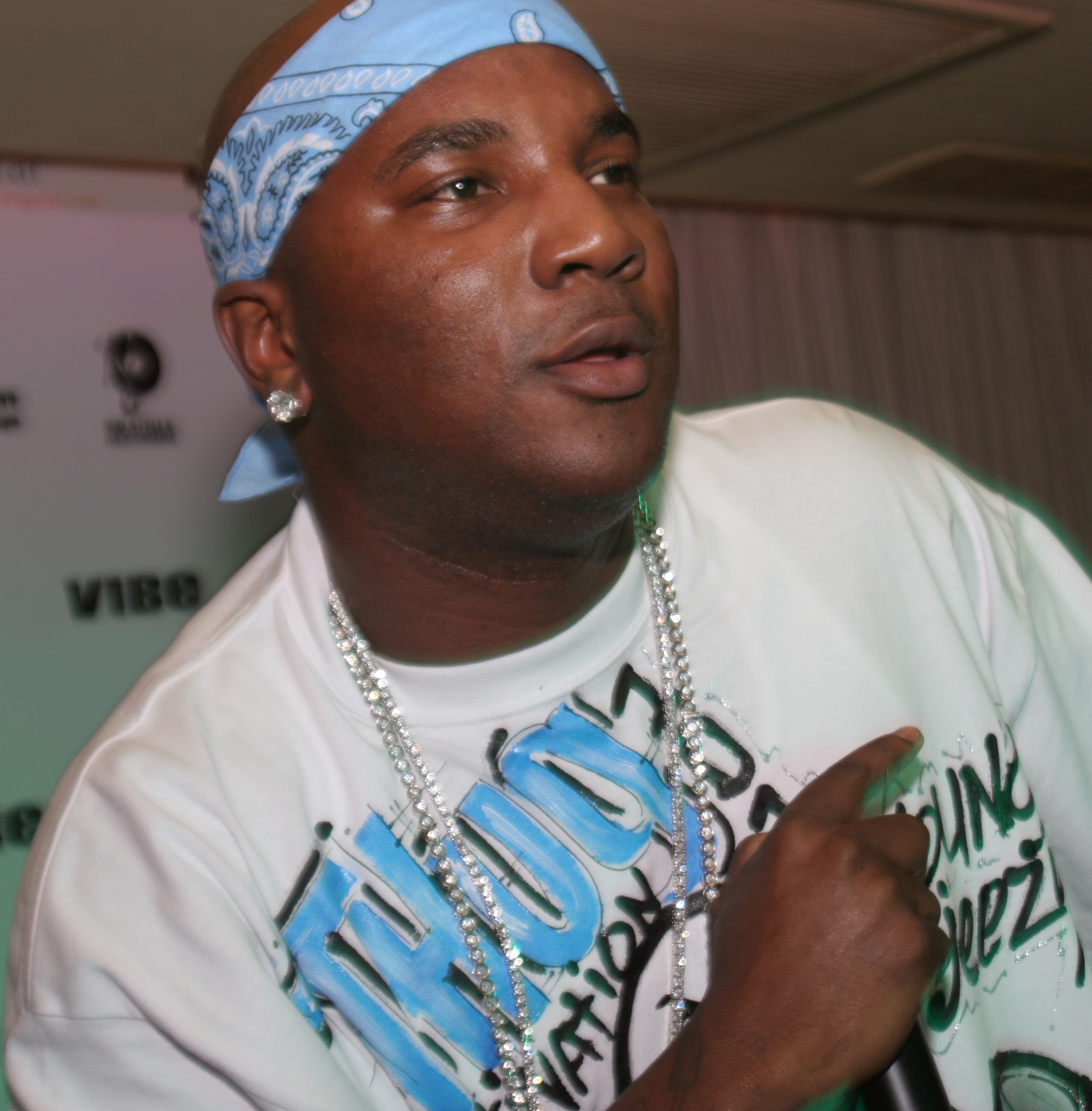
- Jeezy in July 2005
- Studio albums: 13
- Singles: 74
- Music videos: 28
- Mixtapes: 17

The discography of Jeezy, an American rapper, consists of thirteen studio albums, 17 mixtapes, 74 singles (including 40 as a featured artist) and 28 music videos. Aside from his solo career, he has also released albums as a member of Boyz N Da Hood and U.S.D.A., respectively.

== Albums ==
=== Studio albums ===
List of studio albums, with selected chart positions, sales figures and certifications
Title	Album details	Peak chart positions				Certifications
Title	Album details	US	US R&B/HH	US Rap	CAN	Certifications
Thuggin' Under the Influence (T.U.I.) (as Lil' J)	Released: August 31, 2001; Label: CTE; Formats: CD, digital download	—	—	—	—	
Come Shop wit Me	Released: October 14, 2003; Label: CTE; Formats: CD, digital download	—	—	—	—	
Let's Get It: Thug Motivation 101	Released: July 26, 2005; Label: CTE, Def Jam; Format: CD, LP, digital download	2	1	1	—	RIAA: 3× Platinum
Thug Motivation 102: The Inspiration	Released: December 12, 2006; Label: CTE, Def Jam; Format: CD, LP, digital download	1	1	1	—	RIAA: Platinum
The Recession	Released: September 2, 2008; Label: CTE, Def Jam; Format: CD, LP, digital download	1	1	1	6	RIAA: Platinum
TM103 Hustlerz Ambition	Released: December 20, 2011; Label: CTE, Def Jam; Format: CD, LP, digital download	3	1	1	45	RIAA: Platinum
Seen It All: The Autobiography	Released: September 2, 2014; Label: CTE, Def Jam; Format: CD, LP, digital download	2	1	1	8	RIAA: Gold
Church in These Streets	Released: November 13, 2015; Label: CTE, Def Jam; Format: CD, digital download	4	2	2	59	
Trap or Die 3	Released: October 28, 2016; Label: YJ Music, Def Jam; Format: CD, LP, digital download	1	1	1	60	RIAA: Gold
Pressure	Released: December 15, 2017; Label: YJ Music, Def Jam; Format: CD, digital download	6	3	3	84	
TM104: The Legend of the Snowman	Released: August 23, 2019; Label: YJ Music, Def Jam; Format: CD, digital download	4	3	3	85	
The Recession 2	Released: November 20, 2020; Label: YJ Music, Def Jam; Format: CD, LP, digital download	19	7	8	—	
I Might Forgive... But I Don't Forget	Released: November 3, 2023; Label: CTE, Stem; Formats: CD, digital download, streaming	21	5	4	—	
"—" denotes a recording that did not chart or was not released in that territory.

=== Collaborative albums ===
List of collaboration albums, with selected chart positions and certifications
Title	Album details	Peak chart positions		
Title	Album details	US	US R&B/HH	US Rap
Boyz n da Hood (with Boyz n da Hood)	Released: June 21, 2005; Label: Bad Boy, Block, CTE, Def Jam; Formats: CD, digital download	5	1	1
Cold Summer (with U.S.D.A.)	Released: May 22, 2007; Label: CTE, Def Jam; Formats: CD, digital download	4	1	1
Boston George & Diego (with Boston George as Boston George & Diego)	Released: January 25, 2019; Label: YJ Music, Def Jam; Formats: CD, digital download	—	—	—
Snofall (with DJ Drama)	Released: October 21, 2022; Label: YJ Music, Agency 99, CTE, Def Jam; Formats: CD, digital download	9	4	3
"—" denotes a recording that did not chart or was not released in that territory.

=== Compilation albums ===
List of compilation albums with selected chart positions and certifications
Title	Album details	Peak chart positions		
Title	Album details	US	US R&B/HH	US Rap
GOATED: Jeezy	Released: December 16, 2022; Label: Def Jam; Formats: Digital download, streaming	—	—	—

== Extended plays ==
List of extended plays, with selected chart positions
Title	EP details	Peak chart positions
Title	EP details	US
Politically Correct	Released: October 10, 2015; Label: CTE, Def Jam; Format: Digital download, streaming	—
Twenty/20 Pyrex Vision	Released: March 27, 2020; Label: Agency 99; Format: Digital download, streaming	115

== Mixtapes ==
List of mixtapes, with year released
Title	Album details
Tha Streets Iz Watchin	Released: July 14, 2004; Label: CTE, Def Jam; Format: Digital download
Trap or Die	Released: January 25, 2005; Label: CTE, Def Jam; Format: Digital download
Can't Ban the Snowman	Released: February 7, 2006; Label: CTE, Def Jam; Format: Digital download
I Am the Street Dream!	Released: November 13, 2006; Label: CTE, Def Jam; Format: Digital download
The Prime Minister	Released: June 15, 2008; Label: CTE, Def Jam; Format: Digital download
Trappin' Ain't Dead	Released: May 22, 2009; Label: CTE, Def Jam; Format: Digital download
Trap or Die Part 2: By Any Means Necessary	Released: May 4, 2010; Label: CTE, Def Jam; Format: Digital download
1,000 Grams	Released: August 12, 2010; Label: CTE, Def Jam; Format: Digital download
The Last Laugh	Released: September 29, 2010; Label: CTE, Def Jam; Format: Digital download
CTE or Nothing (with U.S.D.A.)	Released: February 4, 2011; Label: Self-released; Format: Digital download
The Real Is Back	Released: May 28, 2011; Label: CTE, Def Jam; Format: Digital download
The Real Is Back 2	Released: September 3, 2011; Label: CTE; Format: Digital download
It's Tha World	Released: December 12, 2012; Label: CTE; Format: Digital download
#ItsThaWorld (with CTE)	Released: May 30, 2013; Label: Self-released; Format: Digital download
Boss Yo Life Up Gang (with CTE)	Released: August 13, 2013; Label: Self-released; Format: Digital download
#ItsThaWorld2 (with CTE)	Released: November 28, 2013; Label: CTE; Format: Digital download
Gangsta Party (with DJ Drama)	Released: May 22, 2015; Label: CTE, Def Jam; Format: Digital download
Still Snowin' (with DJ Drama)	Released: September 28, 2025; Label: JWJ; Format: Digital download

== Singles ==
=== As lead artist ===
List of singles as lead artist, with selected chart positions and certifications, showing year released and album name
Title	Year	Peak chart positions							Certifications	Album
Title	Year	US	US R&B/HH	US Rap	CAN	GER	IRE	UK	Certifications	Album
"And Then What" (featuring Mannie Fresh)	2005	67	14	13	—	—	—	—	RIAA: Gold	Let's Get It: Thug Motivation 101
"Soul Survivor" (featuring Akon)	2005	4	1	1	—	74	32	16	RIAA: 4× Platinum; RMNZ: Gold	Let's Get It: Thug Motivation 101
"Go Crazy" (featuring Jay-Z)	2005	— (Note: "Go Crazy" did not enter the Billboard Hot 100, but peaked at number three on the Bubbling Under Hot 100 Singles chart.)	22	22	—	—	—	—	RIAA: Gold	Let's Get It: Thug Motivation 101
"My Hood"	2005	77	30	19	—	—	—	—	RIAA: Gold	Let's Get It: Thug Motivation 101
"I Luv It"	2006	14	13	7	—	—	—	—	RIAA: Platinum	The Inspiration
"Go Getta" (featuring R. Kelly)	2007	18	9	3	—	—	—	—	RIAA: Platinum	The Inspiration
"Dreamin'" (featuring Keyshia Cole)	2007	—	65	—	—	—	—	—		The Inspiration
"Put On" (featuring Kanye West)	2008	12	3	1	46	—	—	—	RIAA: 3× Platinum; RMNZ: Gold	The Recession
"Vacation"	2008	—	56	—	—	—	—	—		The Recession
"Crazy World"	2008	—	66	—	—	—	—	—		The Recession
"My President" (featuring Nas)	2008	53	45	13	—	—	—	—	RIAA: Platinum	The Recession
"Who Dat"	2008	—	49	—	—	—	—	—		The Recession
"Lose My Mind" (featuring Plies)	2010	35	5	3	—	—	—	—	RIAA: Platinum	Thug Motivation 103: Hustlerz Ambition
"Ballin'" (featuring Lil Wayne)	2011	57	15	13	—	—	—	—		Thug Motivation 103: Hustlerz Ambition
"F.A.M.E." (featuring T.I.)	2011	— (Note: "F.A.M.E." did not enter the Billboard Hot 100, but peaked at number 19 on the Bubbling Under Hot 100 Singles chart.)	67	—	—	—	—	—		Thug Motivation 103: Hustlerz Ambition
"I Do" (featuring Jay-Z and André 3000)	2012	61	4	9	—	—	—	—		Thug Motivation 103: Hustlerz Ambition
"Leave You Alone" (featuring Ne-Yo)	2012	51	3	2	—	—	—	—	RIAA: Platinum	Thug Motivation 103: Hustlerz Ambition
"Way Too Gone" (featuring Future)	2012	—	87	—	—	—	—	—		Thug Motivation 103: Hustlerz Ambition
"Get Right"	2012	—	— (Note: "Get Right" did not enter the Billboard Hot R&B/Hip-Hop Songs, but peaked at number two on the Bubbling Under R&B/Hip-Hop Singles chart.)	—	—	—	—	—		It's Tha World
"R.I.P." (featuring 2 Chainz)	2013	58	17	12	—	—	—	—	RIAA: Platinum	It's Tha World
"Me OK"	2014	—	— (Note: "Me OK" did not enter the Billboard Hot R&B/Hip-Hop Songs, but peaked at number one on the Bubbling Under R&B/Hip-Hop Singles chart.)	—	—	—	—	—	RIAA: Gold	Seen It All: The Autobiography
"Seen It All" (featuring Jay-Z)	2014	85	24	20	—	—	—	—	RIAA: Platinum	Seen It All: The Autobiography
"GOD"	2015	—	—	—	—	—	—	—		Church in These Streets
"Church in These Streets"	2015	—	—	—	—	—	—	—		Church in These Streets
"Gold Bottles"	2015	—	—	—	—	—	—	—		Church in These Streets
"Sweet Life" (featuring Janelle Monáe)	2015	—	—	—	—	—	—	—		Church in These Streets
"Magic City Monday" (Note: An homage to Magic City.) (featuring 2 Chainz and Future)	2016	—	— (Note: "Magic City Monday" did not enter the Billboard Hot R&B/Hip-Hop Songs, but peaked at number two on the Bubbling Under R&B/Hip-Hop Singles chart.)	—	—	—	—	—		non-album single
"Let Em Know"	2016	—	—	—	—	—	—	—		Trap or Die 3
"All There" (featuring Bankroll Fresh)	2016	— (Note: "All There" did not enter the Billboard Hot 100, but peaked at number six on the Bubbling Under Hot 100 Singles chart.)	50	—	—	—	—	—	RIAA: 2× Platinum	Trap or Die 3
"Bottles Up" (featuring Puff Daddy)	2017	—	—	—	—	—	—	—		Pressure
"Cold Summer" (featuring Tee Grizzley)	2017	—	—	—	—	—	—	—		Pressure
"1 Time"	2019	—	—	—	—	—	—	—		TM104: The Legend of the Snowman
"MLK BLVD" (featuring Meek Mill)	2019	—	—	—	—	—	—	—		TM104: The Legend of the Snowman
"Back" (featuring Yo Gotti)	2020	— (Note: "Back" did not enter the Billboard Hot 100, but peaked at number 16 on the Bubbling Under Hot 100 Singles chart.)	—	—	—	—	—	—		The Recession 2
"—" denotes a recording that did not chart or was not released in that territory.

=== As featured artist ===
List of singles as featured artist, with selected chart positions and certifications, showing year released and album name
Title	Year	Peak chart positions										Certifications	Album
Title	Year	US	US R&B/HH	US Rap	AUS	CAN	GER	IRE	NZ	SWE	UK	Certifications	Album
"Icy" (Gucci Mane featuring Young Jeezy and Boo)	2005	— (Note: "Icy" did not enter the Billboard Hot 100, but peaked at number five on the Bubbling Under Hot 100 Singles chart.)	46	23	—	—	—	—	—	—	—		Trap House
"Get Throwed" (Bun B featuring Pimp C, Z-Ro, Jay-Z and Young Jeezy)	2006	—	49	24	—	—	—	—	—	—	—		Trill
"Say I" (Christina Milian featuring Young Jeezy)	2006	21	13	—	45	—	38	15	23	—	4		So Amazin'
"Diamonds" (Remix) (Slim Thug featuring Young Jeezy, Slick Pulla and Killa)	2006	— (Note: "Diamonds" (Remix) did not enter the Billboard Hot 100, but peaked at number six on the Bubbling Under Hot 100 Singles chart.)	73	—	—	—	—	—	—	—	—		Already Platinum
"Grew Up a Screw Up" (Ludacris featuring Young Jeezy)	2006	—	60	—	—	—	—	—	—	—	—		Release Therapy
"Diamonds" (Fabolous featuring Young Jeezy)	2007	83	59	—	—	—	—	—	—	—	—		From Nothin' to Somethin'
"5000 Ones" (DJ Drama featuring Nelly, T.I., Yung Joc, Willie the Kid, Young Jeezy and Twista)	2007	—	73	—	—	—	—	—	—	—	—		Gangsta Grillz: The Album
"100 Million" (Birdman featuring Young Jeezy, Rick Ross and Lil Wayne)	2007	— (Note: "100 Million" did not enter the Billboard Hot 100, but peaked at number 18 on the Bubbling Under Hot 100 Singles chart.)	69	19	—	—	—	—	—	—	—		5 * Stunna
"Love in This Club" (Usher featuring Young Jeezy)	2008	1	1	—	8	6	5	3	1	8	4	RIAA: 5× Platinum; ARIA: Gold; BPI: Platinum; RMNZ: 4× Platinum	Here I Stand
"Louie" (Blood Raw featuring Young Jeezy)	2008	—	69	—	—	—	—	—	—	—	—		My Life: The True Testimony
"Out Here Grindin" (DJ Khaled featuring Akon, Rick Ross, Young Jeezy, Lil Boosie, Trick Daddy, Ace Hood and Plies)	2008	38	32	17	—	71	—	—	—	—	—	RIAA: Gold; MC: Gold	We Global
"I'm So Paid" (Akon featuring Lil Wayne and Young Jeezy)	2008	31	47	—	91	41	—	—	—	21	59	RIAA: Platinum; BPI: Silver	Freedom
"Never Ever" (Ciara featuring Young Jeezy)	2009	66	9	—	—	—	—	—	—	25	—	RIAA: Gold	Fantasy Ride
"Amazing" (Kanye West featuring Young Jeezy)	2009	81	65	22	—	—	—	—	—	42	—	RIAA: Platinum	808s & Heartbreak
"Better Believe It" (Lil Boosie featuring Webbie and Young Jeezy)	2009	—	40	23	—	—	—	—	—	—	—		Superbad: The Return of Boosie Bad Azz
"I'm Goin' In" (Drake featuring Lil Wayne and Young Jeezy)	2009	40	28	11	—	—	—	—	—	—	—	RIAA: Platinum	So Far Gone
"Fed Up" (DJ Khaled featuring Usher, Drake, Young Jeezy and Rick Ross)	2009	— (Note: "Fed Up" did not enter the Billboard Hot 100, but peaked at number eight on the Bubbling Under Hot 100 Singles chart.)	45	22	—	—	—	—	—	—	—		Victory
"Hard" (Rihanna featuring Young Jeezy)	2009	8	14	—	51	9	—	33	15	26	42	RIAA: Platinum; ARIA: Gold	Rated R
"Put Your Hands Up"^{[G]} (DJ Khaled featuring Young Jeezy, Plies, Rick Ross and Schife)	2010	—	— (Note: "Put Your Hands Up" did not enter the Billboard Hot R&B/Hip-Hop Songs, but peaked at number two on the Bubbling Under R&B/Hip-Hop Singles chart.)	—	—	—	—	—	—	—	—		Victory
"(Ha Ha) Slow Down" (Fat Joe featuring Young Jeezy)	2010	—	54	23	—	—	—	—	—	—	—		The Darkside Vol. 1
"Just Like That" (Bun B featuring Young Jeezy)	2010	—	—	—	—	—	—	—	—	—	—		Trill OG
"Amen" (Pusha T featuring Kanye West and Young Jeezy)	2011	—	—	—	—	—	—	—	—	—	—		Fear of God II: Let Us Pray
"We in This Bitch" (DJ Drama featuring Young Jeezy, T.I., Ludacris and Future)	2012	—	68	—	—	—	—	—	—	—	—		Quality Street Music
"Thug Motivation" Lil Cory featuring Young Jeezy)	2012	—	—	—	—	—	—	—	—	—	—		Retaliation
"Hold On (Shut Up)" (MGK featuring Young Jeezy)	2012	—	86	—	—	—	—	—	—	—	—		Lace Up
"Show Out" (Juicy J featuring Young Jeezy and Big Sean)	2013	75	23	17	—	—	—	—	—	—	—		Stay Trippy
"Major Distribution" (50 Cent featuring Snoop Dogg and Young Jeezy)	2013	— (Note: "Major Distribution" did not enter the Billboard Hot 100, but peaked at number 13 on the Bubbling Under Hot 100 Singles chart.)	43	—	—	—	—	—	—	—	166		Non-album single
"My Cabana" (Ty Dolla Sign featuring Young Jeezy)	2013	—	—	—	—	—	—	—	—	—	—		Beach House 2
"Act Right" (Yo Gotti featuring Jeezy and YG)	2013	100	33	22	—	—	—	—	—	—	—	RIAA: Gold	I Am
"My Nigga"^{[A]} (YG featuring Jeezy and Rich Homie Quan)	2013	19	5	3	69	—	—	—	—	50	53	RIAA: 5× Platinum; BPI: Gold; RMNZ: 2× Platinum	My Krazy Life
"Mob Life" (Doughboyz Cashout featuring Jeezy)	2013	—	—	—	—	—	—	—	—	—	—		Boss Yo Life Up Gang
"Double Cup" (DJ Infamous featuring Jeezy, Ludacris, Juicy J, The Game and Hitmaka)	2013	—	53	—	—	—	—	—	—	—	—		Talk 2 Me
"Make It Home" (August Alsina featuring Jeezy)	2014	—	52	—	—	—	—	—	—	—	—		Testimony
"War Ready" (Rick Ross featuring Jeezy)	2014	—	49	—	—	—	—	—	—	—	—		Mastermind
"Money Can't Buy" (Ne-Yo featuring Jeezy)	2014	— (Note: "Money Can't Buy" did not enter the Billboard Hot 100, but peaked at number 17 on the Bubbling Under Hot 100 Singles chart.)	41	—	—	—	—	—	—	—	—		Non-Fiction
"Gumbo" (Stak5 featuring Rocko, T.I. and Jeezy)	2014	—	—	—	—	—	—	—	—	—	—		TBA
"Right Back" (DJ Drama featuring Jeezy, Young Thug and Rich Homie Quan)	2014	—	—	—	—	—	—	—	—	—	—		Quality Street Music 2
"Run the Check Up" (DJ Infamous featuring Jeezy, Ludacris, and Yo Gotti)	2016	—	—	—	—	—	—	—	—	—	—		Talk 2 Me
"That's On Me" (Remix) (Yella Beezy featuring 2 Chainz, T.I., Rich The Kid, Jeezy, Boosie Badazz and Trapboy Freddy)	2018	56	—	—	—	—	—	—	—	—	—	RIAA: Gold	Ain't No Goin' Bacc
"Okay" (Remix) (JT with Jeezy)	2024	—	—	—	—	—	—	—	—	—	—		City Cinderella
"—" denotes a recording that did not chart or was not released in that territory.

=== Promotional singles ===
List of promotional singles, with selected chart positions, showing year released and album name
Title	Year	Peak chart positions		Album
Title	Year	US	US R&B/HH	Album
"I'm So Hood" (Remix) (DJ Khaled featuring Young Jeezy, Ludacris, Busta Rhymes, Big Boi, Lil Wayne, Fat Joe, Birdman and Rick Ross)	2007	—	—	We the Best
"All White Everything" (featuring Yo Gotti)	2010	—	— (Note: "All White Everything" did not enter the Billboard Hot R&B/Hip-Hop Songs, but peaked at number three on the Bubbling Under R&B/Hip-Hop Singles chart.)	Non-album singles
"Jizzle" (featuring Lil Jon)	2010	— (Note: "Jizzle" did not enter the Billboard Hot 100, but peaked at number 16 on the Bubbling Under Hot 100 Singles chart.)	69	Non-album singles
"Shake Life"	2011	—	46	Non-album singles
"In My Head"	2013	—	—	Non-album singles
"Pour It Up" (Remix) (Rihanna featuring Young Jeezy, Rick Ross, Juicy J and T.I.)	2013	—	—	Non-album singles
"Ordinary" (Trey Songz featuring Jeezy)	2014	—	—	Non-album singles
"Hustlaz Holiday"	2015	—	—	Church in These Streets
"—" denotes a recording that did not chart or was not released in that territory.

== Other charted songs ==
List of songs, with selected chart positions, showing year released and album name
Title	Year	Peak chart positions			Certifications	Album
Title	Year	US	US R&B/HH	US Rap	Certifications	Album
"Standing Ovation"	2005	—	—	—	RIAA: Gold	Let's Get It: Thug Motivation 101
"Gangsta Music"	2005	—	—	—	RIAA: Gold	Let's Get It: Thug Motivation 101
"Bottom of the Map"	2005	—	—	—	RIAA: Gold	Let's Get It: Thug Motivation 101
"Trap Star"	2005	—	50	—	RIAA: Gold	Let's Get It: Thug Motivation 101
"Tear It Up" (featuring Lloyd and Slick Pulla)	2005	—	77	—	RIAA: Gold	Let's Get It: Thug Motivation 101
"Trap or Die" (featuring Bun B)	2005	—	77	—	RIAA: Gold	Let's Get It: Thug Motivation 101
"Luxury Tax" (Rick Ross featuring Lil Wayne, Trick Daddy and Young Jeezy)	2008	— (Note: "Luxury Tax" did not enter the Billboard Hot 100, but peaked at number three on the Bubbling Under Hot 100 Singles chart.)	—	—		Trilla
"Real As It Gets" (Jay-Z featuring Young Jeezy)	2009	—	82	—		The Blueprint 3
"Unforgettable" (Drake featuring Young Jeezy)	2010	— (Note: "Unforgettable" did not enter the Billboard Hot 100, but peaked at number 24 on the Bubbling Under Hot 100 Singles chart.)	— (Note: "Unforgettable" did not enter the Billboard Hot R&B/Hip-Hop Songs, but peaked at number six on the Bubbling Under R&B/Hip-Hop Singles chart.)	—		Thank Me Later
"Be the One" (Lloyd featuring Trey Songz and Young Jeezy)	2011	—	— (Note: "Be the One" did not enter the Billboard Hot R&B/Hip-Hop Songs, but peaked at number nine on the Bubbling Under R&B/Hip-Hop Singles chart.)	—		King of Hearts
"SupaFreak" (featuring 2 Chainz)	2011	—	39	24	RIAA: Gold	Thug Motivation 103: Hustlerz Ambition
"OJ" (featuring Fabolous and Jadakiss)	2011	—	— (Note: "OJ" did not enter the Billboard Hot R&B/Hip-Hop Songs, but peaked at number 13 on the Bubbling Under R&B/Hip-Hop Singles chart.)	—		Thug Motivation 103: Hustlerz Ambition
"Hail Mary" (Trey Songz featuring Young Jeezy and Lil Wayne)	2012	— (Note: "Hail Mary" did not enter the Billboard Hot 100, but peaked at number six on the Bubbling Under Hot 100 Singles chart.)	77	—		Chapter V
"Bout That" (featuring Lil Wayne)	2016	— (Note: "Bout That" did not enter the Billboard Hot 100, but peaked at number 13 on the Bubbling Under Hot 100 Singles chart.)	— (Note: "Bout That" did not enter the Billboard Hot R&B/Hip-Hop Songs, but peaked at number five on the Bubbling Under R&B/Hip-Hop Singles chart.)	—		Trap or Die 3
"American Dream" (featuring J. Cole and Kendrick Lamar)	2017	— (Note: "American Dream" did not enter the Billboard Hot 100, but peaked at number five on the Bubbling Under Hot 100 Singles chart.)	48	—		Pressure
"Big Boy Talk" (DJ Khaled featuring Jeezy and Rick Ross)	2019	— (Note: "Big Boy Talk" did not chart on the Billboard Hot 100 chart but did peak at number 14 on the Bubbling Under Hot 100 Singles chart.)	—	—		Father of Asahd
"—" denotes a recording that did not chart or was not released in that territory.

== Guest appearances ==
List of non-single guest appearances, with other performing artists, showing year released and album name
Title	Year	Other artist(s)	Album
"Fuckin' Around"	2004	Trick Daddy, T.I., Kase 1	Thug Matrimony: Married to the Streets
"Do Tha Damn Thang"	2004	Fabolous	Real Talk
"Streets On Lock"	2005	Bleu Davinci, Fabolous	Streets On Lock
"Make It Work for You"	2005	Juelz Santana, Lil Wayne	What the Game's Been Missing!
"Black Tee"	2005	Gucci Mane, Killer Mike, Jody Breeze, Bun B, Lil Scrappy	Trap House
"Icy"	2005	Gucci Mane	Trap House
"Get Money"	2005	Stat Quo	Road to Statlanta
"Fuck Where You From"		P$C	25 To Life
"Shake It Off" (Remix)	2006	Mariah Carey, Jay-Z	none
"Hustlin'" (Remix)	2006	Rick Ross, Jay-Z	Port of Miami
"I'm Straight"	2006	T.I., B.G.	King
"Top Back" (Remix)	2006	T.I., Young Dro, Big Kuntry King, B.G.	Grand Hustle Presents: In da Streetz Volume 4
"How We Do It"	2006	Fabolous, Slick Pulla, Paul Cain	none
"Pushin'"	2006	Bun B, Scarface	Trill
"Get Throwed"	2006	Bun B, Pimp C, Z-Ro, Jay-Z	Trill
"Diamonds" (Remix)	2006	Slim Thug, Z-Ro	Southern Lean, Vol. 3
"Gangsta Shit"	2006	DJ Khaled, Blood Raw, Slick Pulla, Bun B	Listennn... the Album
"Tell, Tell, Tell (Stop Snitchin')"	2006	Project Pat, Mr. Bigg, Lyfe Jennings	Crook by da Book: The Fed Story
"King Kong" (Remix)	2006	Jibbs, Chamillionaire	Jibbs Featuring Jibbs
"Brown Paper Bag"	2007	DJ Khaled, Dre, Juelz Santana, Rick Ross, Fat Joe, Lil Wayne	We the Best
"I'm So Hood" (Remix)	2007	DJ Khaled, Ludacris, T-Pain, Busta Rhymes, Big Boi, Lil Wayne, Fat Joe, Birdman, Rick Ross,	We the Best
"Diamonds"	2007	Fabolous	From Nothin' To Somethin'
"Grew Up A Screw Up"	2007	Ludacris	Release Therapy
"We Takin' Over" (Remix)	2007	DJ Khaled, Akon, R. Kelly, T-Pain, Lil' Kim	none
"Hood Nigga" (The Block Remix)	2007	Gorilla Zoe, Big Boi, Jody Breeze, Rick Ross	none
"Money in the Bank" (Remix)	2007	Swizz Beatz, Eve, Elephant Man	none
"Umma Do Me" (Remix)	2007	Rocko, T.I., Rick Ross	none
"Dey Know" (Remix)	2007	Shawty Lo, Plies, Ludacris, Lil Wayne	none
"Duffle Bag Boy" (Remix)	2007	Playaz Circle, Slick Pulla, Lil Wayne	none
"Pockets Full of Paper"	2007	Young Buck	Buck the World
"4 Kings"	2007	Young Buck, T.I., Pimp C	Buck The World
"Love In This Club"	2007	Usher	Here I Stand
"Wanna B'z"	2007	Snoop Dogg, Nate Dogg	Blue Carpet Treatment: The Mixtape
"100 Million"	2007	Birdman, Lil Wayne, Rick Ross	5 * Stunna
"Blow It Up"	2007	R. Kelly, Young Dro	none
"CTE Movement"	2007	Roccet	none
"She Can Get It"	2007	T.I.	none
"Baby Powder"	2007	Boo Rossini	The #1 D-Boi Boo Rossini
"I Luv Your Girl" (Remix)	2008	The-Dream	none
"Superstar" (Remix)	2008	Lupe Fiasco, T.I., Matthew Santos	none
"Can't Tell Me Nothing" (Remix)	2008	Kanye West	none
"Spotlight, Pt. 2"	2008	Jennifer Hudson	none
"Hurt" (Remix)	2008	T.I., Trae Tha Truth	The Diary of Tha Truth
"Side Effects"	2008	Mariah Carey	E=MC²
"Luxury Tax"	2008	Rick Ross, Lil Wayne, Trick Daddy	Trilla
"Im So Paid"	2008	Akon, Lil Wayne	Freedom
"Guns Pop Off"	2008	T.I.	Hood Bangers #2
"That Ain't It (Uhh Uhh)"	2008	T.I.	Hood Bangers #2
"I Got It"	2008	Young Buck	Still Ten a Key, Pt. 2
"Louie"	2008	Blood Raw	My Life: The True Testimony
"Armored Truck"	2008	B.G.	Champion
"I Got My Locs On"	2008	Ice Cube	Raw Footage
"Amazing"	2008	Kanye West	808s & Heartbreak
"Blame It" (Remix)	2009	Jamie Foxx, T-Pain	none
"Something Else"	2009	Jadakiss	The Last Kiss
"Something Else" (Remix)	2009	Jadakiss, Snype Life, Bully, Boo Rossini, Blood Raw, AP	The Last Kiss
"All the Above" (Remix)	2009	Maino, T-Pain	none
"Always Strapped" (Remix)	2009	Birdman, Lil Wayne, Rick Ross	none
"Go Girl"	2009	Ludacris	none
"Drinkin' and Drivin'"	2009	Ludacris	none
"Better Believe It"	2009	Lil Boosie, Webbie	Superbad: The Return of Boosie Bad Azz
"I'm Goin' In"	2009	Drake, Lil Wayne	So Far Gone
"Never Ever"	2009	Ciara	Fantasy Ride
"Hard"	2009	Rihanna	Rated R
"Real as It Gets"	2009	Jay-Z	The Blueprint 3
"Erryday"	2009	Triple C's, Schife, JW	Custom Cars & Cycles
"Get Money"	2009	E-40, B-Legit	Revenue Retrievin': Graveyard Shift
"4 My Town" (Remix)	2009	Birdman, Drake, Lil Wayne	none
"Lay It Down" (Remix)	2010	Lloyd, R. Kelly	none
"Reverse Cowgirl"	2010	T-Pain	none
"Killa"	2010	Boo Rossini, Drake	601 To The 615
"D Boy"	2010	Boo Rossini	601 To The 615
"Stop Playin Wit Me" (Remix)	2010	Boo Rossini, Young Buck	601 To The 615
"Look Like"	2010	Plies, Fabolous	Goon Affiliated
"Unforgettable"	2010	Drake	Thank Me Later
"Start It Up" (Remix)	2010	Lloyd Banks, Kanye West, Fabolous, Swizz Beatz, Ryan Leslie	none
"Just Like That"	2010	Bun B	Trill OG
"Put Ya Hands Up"	2010	Dj Khaled, Rick Ross, Plies, Schife	Victory
"Fed Up"	2010	DJ Khaled, Usher, Drake, Lil Wayne	Victory
"No Competition"	2010	T.I.	Fuck a Mixtape
"Money"	2011	DJ Khaled, Ludacris	We the Best Forever
"Slangin Birds"	2011	2 Chainz, Yo Gotti, Birdman	T.R.U. REALigion
"Afghan" (Remix)	2011	Tone Trump	The New Fresh Prince
"Real Niggaz"	2011	Tone Trump, Freddie Gibbs, JW	The New Fresh Prince
"Four" (Remix)	2011	Alley Boy, Yo Gotti	I'm On One
"Kitchen"	2011	2 Chainz, Pusha T	Codeine Cowboy (A 2 Chainz Collective)
"Welcome to My Hood" (Remix)	2011	DJ Khaled, Rick Ross, Lil Wayne, T-Pain	none
"My Fuckin' House"	2011	Snoop Dogg, E-40	Doggumentary
"Pop a Bottle"	2011	Roscoe Dash	none
"Fool's Gold"	2011	Yo Gotti, DJ Khaled, Rick Ross, Soulja Boy	none
"Paramedics"	2011	Game	The R.E.D. Album
"My Jewel"	2011	Birdman, Bun B	Bigga Than Life
"Down South"	2011	Boyz N Da Hood	none
"Be the One"	2011	Lloyd, Trey Songz	King of Hearts
"Hustle Hard" (Remix)	2011	Ace Hood, Swizz Beatz	none
"Amen"	2011	Pusha T, Kanye West	Fear of God II: Let Us Pray
"Homicide" (Remix)	2011	Wiz Khalifa, Chevy Woods	none
"Rollin'" (Remix)	2011	Gunplay, Fabolous	none
"Racks" (Remix)	2011	YC, Wiz Khalifa, Wale, Waka Flocka Flame, Trae, Nelly, Cory Gunz, Cory Mo, Big Sean, B.o.B, Dose, Twista, Bun B, Yo Gotti, Ace Hood, Maino, CyHi the Prynce	none
"Fuck da City Up"	2012	T.I.	Fuck da City Up
"Up!" (Remix)	2012	LoveRance, 50 Cent, T.I.	none
"Birds Take a Bath"	2012	Future, Young Scooter	none
"Strange Clouds" (Remix)	2012	B.o.B, T.I.	none
"Whole Thang" (Remix)	2012	2Win, 2 Chainz	none
"Rack City" (Remix)	2012	Tyga, Wale, Fabolous, Meek Mill, T.I.	none
"Champion"	2012	Nicki Minaj, Nas, Drake	Pink Friday: Roman Reloaded
"Pull Up"	2012	Freddie Gibbs, T.I.	none
"Traffickin"	2012	Jadakiss, Yo Gotti	Consignment
"Choppa Talk"	2012	Trae the Truth. Yo Gotti	Tha Blackprint
"Ask Me About It"	2012	Scrilla	The Demonstration
"Jet Life" (Remix)	2012	Currensy, Big K.R.I.T., Lil Wayne	none
"Hail Mary"	2012	Trey Songz, Lil Wayne	Chapter V
"Westside, Right On Time"	2012	Kendrick Lamar	none
"Balcony"	2012	Cassie	Rock-A-Bye Baby
"Champagne For The Pain"	2012	Red Cafe	American Psycho
"Choppa Talk"	2012	Trae Tha Truth, Yo Gotti	Tha Blackprint
"Function" (Remix)	2012	E-40, Problem, Red Cafe, French Montana, Chris Brown	none
"Work Hard, Play Hard" (Remix)	2012	Wiz Khalifa, Lil Wayne	none
"Cashin' Out" (Remix)	2012	Cash Out, Akon, Fabolous, Yo Gotti	none
"Bout That Life"	2012	Verse Simmonds	Fuck Your Feelings
"My Homies Still" (Remix)	2012	Jae Millz, Gudda Gudda	Dedication 4
"Hold It Down"	2012	Kirko Bangz	Procrastination Kills 4
"Never Die"	2012	DJ Drama, Jadakiss, Cee Lo Green, Nipsey Hussle	Quality Street Music
"Go For It"	2012	Freddie Gibbs	Baby Face Killa
"Seventeen"	2012	Freddie Gibbs, Slick Pulla	Baby Face Killa
"All She Wants"	2012	Ne-Yo, RaVaughn	R.E.D.
"I Remember"	2012	Game, Future	Jesus Piece
"Understand Me"	2012	Chief Keef	Finally Rich
"Gangsta Bitch"	2012	Mike WiLL Made It	Est. In 1989 2.5
"On the Scene"	2012	Chip, T.I.	London Boy
"High and Fly"	2012	Scrilla, Cap1	none
"All Gold Everything" (Remix)	2013	Trinidad James, T.I., 2 Chainz	Don't Be S.A.F.E.
"Gang Bang"	2013	Cap1, Game	T.R.U. 2 It
"Playin'"	2013	YG, Wiz Khalifa	Just Re'd Up 2
"Traffic" (Remix)	2013	Lil Reese, Twista	none
"My Cabana" (Remix)	2013	Ty Dolla Sign	Beach House 2
"Homie"	2013	Funkmaster Flex, YG	Who You Mad At? Me or Yourself?
"Gangsta Of The Year"	2013	Funkmaster Flex, Yo Gotti, Jadakiss	Who You Mad At? Me or Yourself?
"Raised in the South"	2013	Ludacris	#IDGAF
"Kenny Lofton"	2013	J. Cole	Truly Yours 2
"We Still in This Bitch" (Remix)	2013	B.o.B., Young Dro, Yo Gotti	none
"Only n Atlanta"	2013	Shad da God, T.I.	G.D.O.D. (Get Dough or Die)
"Mob Life" (Remix)	2013	Doughboyz Cashout	#ItsThaWorld
"Woke Up"	2013	Doughboyz Cashout, Yo Gotti	#ItsThaWorld
"4 What"	2013	DJ Drama, Juicy J, Yo Gotti	Quality Street Music 2
"My Nigga"	2013	YG, Rich Homie Quan	My Krazy Life
"Act Right"	2013	Yo Gotti, YG	I Am
"Beautiful" (Remix)	2013	Mariah Carey, Miguel	none
"Pour Up" (Remix)	2013	Clyde Carson, Game	Playboy
"Commas" (Remix)	2013	L.E.P. Bogus Boys, T.I., Mase, Spenzo	Don't Feed Da Killaz Vol. 4
"Pay The Rent"	2013	Juvenile, Yo Gotti	none
"Bossin Up" (Remix)	2013	Kid Ink, YG	none
"V.S.O.P." (Remix)	2013	K. Michelle	none
"It's Time"	2013	Big Sean, Payroll	Hall of Fame
"No Regrets"	2013	Pusha T, Kevin Cossom	My Name Is My Name
"Spend That"	2013	R. Kelly	Black Panties
"Tonight"	2013	E-40, Cousin Fik	The Block Brochure: Welcome to the Soil 6
"Shit" (Megamix)	2013	Mike Will Made It, Future, Rick Ross, Drake, Meek Mill, Fat Trel, Schoolboy Q, T.I., Tracy T, Juicy J, Diddy, Pastor Troy	#MikeWillBeenTrill
"You Know"	2013	Fabolous	The S.O.U.L. Tape 3
"Plug" (Remix)	2013	Boston George, Boo Rossini	Drug War
"Jose Got Them Tacos"	2013	Kap G	Beer and Tacos
"On Me"	2014	Wiz Khalifa	Blacc Hollywood
"G' Shit"	2014	T.I., Watch The Duck	Paperwork
"Black on Black"	2014	The Game	Blood Moon: Year of the Wolf
"Dikembe"	2014	DJ Infamous, 2 Chainz	none
"All About The Money" (Remix)	2014	Troy Ave, Rick Ross	none
"About The Money" (Remix)	2014	T.I., Young Thug, Lil Wayne	none
"Pretend" (Remix)	2014	Tinashe	none
"Love Em All" (Remix)	2014	K. Michelle	none
"Try Me" (Remix)	2015	DeJ Loaf, T.I.	none
"Preach" (Remix)	2015	Young Dolph, Rick Ross	none
"Co Co Pt. 2"	2015	O.T. Genasis, Meek Mill	none
"Do Me Like That"	2015	DJ Sense, Monica, Yo Gotti	none
"Mercy On My Soul"	2015	Boosie Badazz	Touchdown 2 Cause Hell
"White Girl"	2015	Lil Wayne	Free Weezy Album
"Keep On Hustlin"	2015	Warren G, Nate Dogg, Bun B	Regulate... G Funk Era, Pt. II
"I Ride"	2015	DJ Khaled, Future, Boosie Badazz, Rick Ross	I Changed a Lot
"Critical"	2015	Jadakiss	Top 5 Dead or Alive
"Blase (Remix)"	2015	Ty Dolla Sign, Juicy J, Diddy	none
"Real Niggas"	2016	Boosie Badazz	none
"Wrist" (Remix)	2016	Chris Brown, Young Thug	Before the Trap: Nights in Tarzana
"Everytime"	2016	French Montana	MC4
"Dope Boy"	2016	DJ Mustard, O.T Genasis	Cold Summer
"Fireworks"	2017	Lil Wayne	In Tune We Trust
"Feeling Like"	2017	Kodak Black	Painting Pictures
Dead President's	2017	Rick Ross, Future, Yo Gotti	Rather You Than Me
"Stand Up" (Remix)	2017	Fabolous, Jadakiss, Future, Yo Gotti	Friday on Elm Street
"Booty" (Remix)	2018	Blac Youngsta, Chris Brown, Trey Songz	none
"February"	2018	Moneybagg Yo	none
"More & More"	2018	T.I.	Dime Trap
"Big Boy Talk"	2019	DJ Khaled, Rick Ross	Father of Asahd
"Born To Kill"	2019	Rick Ross	Port of Miami 2
"Handsome" (Remix)	2020	Dave East	Karma 3 (Deluxe)
"Dope Game"	2020	YFN Lucci, Yo Gotti, Bigga Rankin	Wish Me Well 3
"Mr Everything"	2023	Westside Gunn, DJ Swamp Izzo	And Then You Pray For Me
"ErrTime" (Remix)	2025	Cardi B	Am I the Drama?

== Music videos ==
=== As lead artist ===
List of music videos, with directors, showing year released
Title	Year	Director(s)
"And Then What" (featuring Mannie Fresh)	2005	Jessy Terrero
"Trap Star / Go Crazy"	2005	Jessy Terrero
"Soul Survivor" (featuring Akon)	2005	Benny Boom, Snowman
"Over Here"	2005	President Thomas Foabes
"My Hood"	2006	Hype Williams
"I Luv It"	2006	Jessy Terrero
"Go Getta" (featuring R. Kelly)	2007	Chris Robinson
"Dreamin'" (featuring Keyshia Cole)	2007	Chris Robinson
"Put On" (featuring Kanye West)	2008	Gil Green
"Vacation"	2008	Gil Green
"Crazy World"	2008	Marc Klasfeld
"Who Dat" (featuring Shawty Redd)	2008	Gabriel Hart
"My President" (featuring Nas)	2009	Gabriel Hart
"Lose My Mind" (featuring Plies)	2010	Taj
"All White Everything" (featuring Yo Gotti)	2010	Taj
"Ballin'" (featuring Lil Wayne)	2011	Colin Tilley
"Win"	2011	Decatur Dan
"F.A.M.E." (featuring T.I.)	2011	Lance Drake
"Nothing"	2011	G. Visuals
"SupaFreak" (featuring 2 Chainz)	2012	G. Visuals
"OJ" (featuring Fabolous and Jadakiss)	2012	Aristotle
"Leave You Alone" (featuring Ne-Yo)	2012	Taj
"Way Too Gone" (featuring Future)	2012	Taj
"We Done It Again"	2012	Steve Carr
"Get Right"	2012	Taj
"El Jefe"	2012	Motion Family
"How it Feel" (featuring Lil Lody)	2012	Motion Family
"R.I.P." (featuring 2 Chainz)	2013	Taj

== See also ==
- Boyz n da Hood discography
- U.S.D.A. discography
