= 601 to the 615 =

601 To The 615

Mixtape by Young Buck & Boo Rossini
- Released: June 22, 2010
- Genres: Southern hip hop, Rap
- Length: 47:26
- Labels: Ca$hville Records, Corporate Thugz Entertainment
- Producer: Unknown

601 To The 615 is a mixtape by rappers Young Buck & Boo Rossini hosted by DJ D.A. and Bigga Rankin. The mixtape features exclusive tracks and freestyles from Boo Rossini & Young Buck. Guest appearances include Young Jeezy, Slick Pulla, Young Breed, Yo Gotti, Lil Wayne and more.

== Track list ==
From Datpiff.

No.	Title	Performed By:	Length
1.	"601 To The 615" (Intro)	Bigga Rankin	1:09
2.	"Business Man"	Young Buck & Boo Rossini	2:48
3.	"Been Gone" (featuring Slick Pulla)	Young Buck & Boo Rossini	3:44
4.	"Get Your Shit Right" (featuring Skruddle)	Young Buck & Boo Rossini	3:44
5.	"Maybe I'm Crazy"	Young Buck	3:28
6.	"Killa" (featuring Boo Rossini & Drake)	Young Jeezy	3:22
7.	"The Realist" (featuring Boo Rossini & Young Buck)	6Tre G	4:29
8.	"Throw It"	Young Buck	2:59
9.	"Loaded"	Boo Rossini	3:26
10.	"Whip It Like A Slave" (featuring Yo Gotti & Lil Wayne)	Boo Rossini	3:37
11.	"I Been Sellin Dope"	Young Buck	2:26
12.	"D Boy" (featuring Boo Rossini)	Young Jeezy	2:28
13.	"Jump The Line"	Young Buck	2:57
14.	"Stop Playin Wit Me (Remix)" (featuring Boo Rossini & Young Buck)	Young Jeezy	2:51
15.	"This Side" (featuring Boo Rossini & Young Buck)	Young Breed	3:01
16.	"601 To The 615" (Outro)	Bigga Rankin	0:51
