= Who Dat =

Who Dat (AAVE for "who is that?") can mean:

- Who Dat?, the name of a support chant by fans of the New Orleans Saints
- "Who Dat" (J. Cole song)
- "Who Dat" (JT Money song)
- "Who Dat" (Young Jeezy song)
