= My President =

Single by Young Jeezy featuring Nas

from the album The Recession
- Released: November 15, 2008
- Recorded: June 3, 2008
- Length: 5:29 (album version); 4:25 (radio edit)
- Label: CTE; Def Jam
- Songwriters: Jay Jenkins; Nasir Jones; Justin Henderson; Christopher Whitacre
- Producer: Tha Bizness

Young Jeezy singles chronology
"Crazy World" (2008)	"My President" (2008)	"Who Dat" (2008)

Nas singles chronology
"Make The World Go Round" (2008)	"My President" (2008)	"Too Many Rappers" (2009)

Music video
- "My President" on YouTube

"My President"
Young Jeezy featuring Nas in a sample of "My President" from The Recession

"My President" is the fourth official single from rapper Young Jeezy's third studio album, The Recession. The song also features rapper Nas and is produced by Tha Bizness. This song was number 16 on Rolling Stone's list of the 100 Best Songs of 2008. Jeezy and Nas recorded the song on the day Barack Obama received the Democratic nomination for the presidency. "My President" is also notable for the unified collaboration between the two artists, who had been having a feud since the 2006 release of Nas' album Hip Hop Is Dead, which contained statements to which Young Jeezy took offense.

== Music video ==
The music video was shot on November 23, 2008, in Atlanta, Georgia, and features many supporters of Barack Obama holding placards with various names written on them including 50 Cent, T.I., Justin Timberlake, Ciara, Fort Minor, Styles of Beyond, Red1, Afu-Ra, Drake, Kanye West, Lil Wayne, Eminem, Kelly Rowland, Jay-Z, Rihanna, 2 Chainz, D4L, Chingy, Cassidy, Young Jeezy and Lil Mama. Other placards name famous world figures like Mahatma Gandhi and Che Guevara. The placards are meant to evoke those held by delegations at national political conventions; however, director Gabriel Hart elected to also include neighborhoods like Queensbridge and countries like Haiti, Israel and Iraq. The Israel placards caused offense to many Palestinians, including Governor and Muslims because of the 2008-2009 Gaza War. Young Jeezy bought his Lamborghini Murcielago for the music video in which he raps, "My president is black, my Lambo is blue".

The music video was released on January 16, 2009 in preparation for Obama's inauguration. It ranked at #44 on BET's Notarized: Top 100 Videos of 2009 countdown.

== Remixes ==
The official remix features former Def Jam labelmate Jay-Z, it was leaked on the internet on January 29, 2009. It was mentioned by Jay-Z, who performed his verse live with Jeezy on January 19, 2009 (2:15 am) at Love Nightclub in Washington, D.C. Jay-Z's verse of the remix was released on January 20, 2009, President Obama's inauguration, it was called the "DC Mix". The remix was also produced by Tha Bizness. Jeezy's new verse of the remix is a diss to Bill O'Reilly. This is the second song off the album that has a remix with Jay-Z, the first song was "Put On", the 1st single. The remix is included in the deluxe edition of Jay-Z's compilation album The Hits Collection, Volume One (2010).

== Chart positions ==
Chart (2008–2009)	Peak position
U.S. Billboard Hot 100	53
U.S. Billboard Hot R&B/Hip-Hop Songs	45
U.S. Billboard Hot Rap Tracks	13

== Certifications ==
Region	Certification	Certified units/sales
United States (RIAA)	Platinum	1,000,000^{‡}
^{‡} Sales+streaming figures based on certification alone.
