= The Recession =

Studio album by Young Jeezy
- Released: September 2, 2008
- Recorded: 2007–2008
- Genre: Hip hop
- Length: 75:44
- Labels: CTE; Def Jam
- Producers: Drumma Boy; Midnight Black; DJ Pain 1; Bangladesh; DJ Toomp; Don Cannon; Fatboi; J.U.S.T.I.C.E. League; Shawty Redd; Street Market Music; Tha Bizness; The Inkredibles; Arnaz "The Nazty One" Smith; T.A.; Crown Kingz Productions; DJ Squeeky; D. Rich

Young Jeezy chronology
The Inspiration: Thug Motivation 102 (2006)	The Recession (2008)	TM103 Hustlerz Ambition (2011)

Singles from The Recession
- 1. "Put On" Released: June 3, 2008; 2. "Vacation" Released: August 12, 2008; 3. "Crazy World" Released: October 25, 2008; 4. "My President" Released: November 15, 2008; 5. "Who Dat" Released: December 17, 2008

The Recession is the fifth studio album by American rapper Young Jeezy. It was released on September 2, 2008, by Corporate Thugz Entertainment (CTE) and Def Jam Recordings. The album was supported by five singles: "Put On" featuring Kanye West, "Vacation", "Crazy World", "My President" featuring Nas, and "Who Dat". The Recession 2, the album's sequel was released in 2020.

The albums title and lyrics make references to the 2007-2008 Great Recession in the United States.

== Singles ==
The album's lead single, "Put On", was released on June 3, 2008. The song features a guest appearance from American rapper Kanye West, while the production was handled by Drumma Boy.

The album's second single, "Vacation", was released on August 12, 2008. The song was produced by the duo The Inkredibles.

The album's third single, "Crazy World", was released on October 25, 2008. The song was produced by Midnight Black.

The album's fourth single, "My President", was released on November 15, 2008. The song features a guest appearance from American rapper Nas, while the production was handled by the duo Tha Bizness.

The album's fifth and final single, "Who Dat", was released on December 17, 2008. The song was produced by Shawty Redd, with co-production by D. Rich.

== Critical reception ==
Professional ratings
Aggregate scores
Source	Rating
Metacritic	(72/100)
Review scores
Source	Rating
AllMusic	3/5 stars
Entertainment Weekly	B+
Los Angeles Times	1.5/4 stars
Pitchfork Media	6.5/10
PopMatters	8/10
Robert Christgau	(2-star Honorable Mention)
RapReviews	8.5/10
Rolling Stone	3/5 stars
Tiny Mix Tapes	2/5 stars
USA Today	3/4 stars

The Recession has a score of 72 out of 100 from Metacritic based on "generally favorable reviews". The Phoenix gave it all four stars and said that "Elsewhere we get lots of the usual earthquake bass and keening synth arpeggios and staccato horns, and, of course, Jeezy’s hypnotically commanding flow, all of it amounting to one of the hardest mainstream rap albums in years." The Guardian gave it four stars out of five and said that "The album touches upon economic issues without dwelling on them, and it captures the spirit of the times with an unerring precision." Slant Magazine also gave it four stars out of five and said, "There's a unique pleasure in hearing a once one-dimensional rapper discover complexity, and for that Recession is nearly indispensable." Billboard gave it a favorable review and stated, "Young Jeezy balances commercial/ pop aspirations with core hip-hop sounds on The Recession, getting a lift from DJ Toomp, Drumma Boy, Midnight Black and longtime collaborator Shawty Redd on this sonically enjoyable follow-up to 2006's 'The Inspiration'." The Village Voice also gave it a favorable review and said that Jeezy's previous two albums "were well-crafted, uncompromising in their focus, and exceptionally entertaining. The Recession makes it three."

AllHipHop gave it a score of seven-and-a-half stars out of ten and said, "Overcoming shaky moments in the album's early half, Jeezy again sets himself apart from his Trap music peers. But this time he combines a serious social theme with his usual content to make that distinction. And while there's no doubt that America is currently in an economic decline, in 2008 that same claim cannot be made about Young Jeezy." The A.V. Club gave it a B and called it "silly, repetitive, and wildly unoriginal. Yet thanks to Jeezy's razor-blade rasp and goofy charisma, it's also strangely infectious." Blender gave it three-and-a-half stars out of five and said that "If Recession-era Jeezy sounds a lot like boom-time Jeezy--describing coke cooking and the cars one gets in reward—that’s because he has always fancied himself an educator, a Learning Annex lecturer, an inspirational-desktop-calendar hustler."

Other reviews are average, mixed or negative: Hartford Courant gave the album an average review and said it was "largely a faithful rehash of his first two platters, which transformed him from unrepentant hustler to unlikely inspirational figure." Paste gave it a 5.8 out of ten and said that the singles "are exceptional, but the filler suffers from a detached and dispirited sound." Prefix Magazine gave it a 4.5 out of ten and said of Jeezy, "Putting out an album called The Recession right now, and draping the American flag over your head on its cover, comes with expectations of politically conscious ruminations. Instead, we get more of the same."

== Commercial performance ==
The Recession debuted at number one on the US Billboard 200, selling 260,000 copies in its first week. This became Jeezy's second US number one debut and his third top-ten album. In its second week, the album dropped to number two on the chart, selling an additional 90,000 copies. In its third week, the album dropped to number six on the chart, selling 60,000 more copies. In its fourth week, the album dropped to number nine on the chart, selling 41,000 copies. As of October 2009, the album sold 886,000 copies in the United States. On July 2, 2020, the album was certified platinum by the Recording Industry Association of America (RIAA) for combined sales and album-equivalent units of over one million units in the United States.

== Track listing ==
No.	Title	Writer(s)	Producer(s)	Length
1.	"The Recession (Intro)"	Jay Jenkins; Aldrin Davis	DJ Toomp	4:38
2.	"Welcome Back"	Jenkins; Hayward Ivy	DJ Squeeky	4:07
3.	"By the Way"	Jenkins; Terry Allen	T.A.	4:00
4.	"Crazy World"	Jenkins; Tracey Sewell	Midnight Black	3:57
5.	"What They Want"	Jenkins; Sewell	Midnight Black	3:53
6.	"Amazin'"	Jenkins; Christopher Gholson	Drumma Boy	4:16
7.	"Hustlaz Ambition"	Jenkins; Gholson	Drumma Boy	3:40
8.	"Who Dat" (featuring Shawty Redd)	Jenkins; Demetrius Stewart; Dwayne Richardson	Shawty Redd; D. Rich (co.)	3:49
9.	"Don't You Know"	Jenkins; Sewell	Midnight Black	4:58
10.	"Circulate"	Jenkins; Donald Clark	Don Cannon	3:49
11.	"Word Play"	Jenkins; Erik Ortiz; Kenny Bartolomei; Kevin Crowe	J.U.S.T.I.C.E. League	3:15
12.	"Vacation"	Jenkins; Leigh Elliott; Maurice Carpenter	The Inkredibles	3:47
13.	"Everything" (featuring Anthony Hamilton and Lil Boosie)	Jenkins; Wolsey Thomas; Metkel Deglel; Anthony Hamilton; Torrence Hatch	Street Market Music	4:41
14.	"Takin' It There" (featuring Trey Songz)	Jenkins; LaDamon Douglas; Tremaine Neverson	Fatboi	3:28
15.	"Don't Do It"	Jenkins; Pacal Bayley	DJ Pain 1	4:06
16.	"Put On" (featuring Kanye West)	Jenkins; Gholson; Kanye West	Drumma Boy	5:21
17.	"Get Allot"	Jenkins; Howard White; Mike Davis; Nico Solis	Crown Kingz Productions	4:29
18.	"My President" (featuring Nas)	Jenkins; Chris Whitacre; Justin Henderson; Nasir Jones	Tha Bizness	5:30

iTunes bonus tracks
No.	Title	Writer(s)	Producer(s)	Length
19.	"Put On (Remix)" (featuring Jay-Z)	Jenkins; Gholson; Shawn Carter	Drumma Boy	4:18
20.	"Done It"	Jenkins; Ortiz; Bartolomei; Crowe	J.U.S.T.I.C.E. League	4:04

== Charts ==
=== Weekly charts ===
Chart (2008)	Peak position
Canadian Albums (Billboard)	6
US Billboard 200	1
US Top R&B/Hip-Hop Albums (Billboard)	1

=== Year-end charts ===
Chart (2008)	Position
US Billboard 200	62
US Top R&B/Hip-Hop Albums (Billboard)	12

Chart (2009)	Position
US Billboard 200	128
US Top R&B/Hip-Hop Albums (Billboard)	34

== Certifications ==
Region	Certification	Certified units/sales
United States (RIAA)	Platinum	1,000,000^{‡}
^{‡} Sales+streaming figures based on certification alone.
