= Crazy World (Young Jeezy song) =

Single by Young Jeezy

from the album The Recession
- Released: May 26, 2009 (Single)
- Recorded: 2008
- Genre: Hip hop; southern hip hop; gangsta rap
- Length: 3:57
- Label: Corporate Thugz, Def Jam
- Songwriters: J. Jenkins, T. Sewell
- Producer: Midnight Black

Young Jeezy singles chronology
"I'm So Paid" (2008)	"Crazy World" (2009)	"My President" (2008)

"Crazy World" is the third official single from rapper Young Jeezy's third studio album, The Recession. Young Jeezy performed this song live at the BET Hip Hop Awards 2008.

== Background ==
The song was thought to be the second single from The Recession, but was later replaced by "Vacation" and was pushed to being the third single. In the song, Young Jeezy talks about the recession America is going through and how he thinks president George W. Bush is punishing America, and this song also talks about the late 2000s recession.

== Music video ==
The music video was made and finished on October 25, 2008. The video was directed by Marc Klasfeld. Young Jeezy stated that he was going to make videos for all of his songs and this one would be the third one (it has now been replaced by My President as the third single). He also made a video for the song "Who Dat". The video premiered on Monday, November 17. The video was played repeatedly throughout the day on MTV2's Un-Leashed.

== Remix ==
- "Crazy World (Oakland Shooting Incident Remix)" (DJ Green Lantern feat. Avery Storm and Uncle Murda)

There is also a second remix that features Tony Yayo, Rock City and Ace Hood.

== Charts ==
Chart (2008)	Peak position
U.S. Billboard Hot R&B/Hip-Hop Songs	66
U.S. Billboard Mainstream R&B/Hip-Hop	37
