= I Might Forgive... But I Don't Forget =

Studio album by Jeezy
- Released: November 3, 2023
- Length: 86:29
- Label: CTE; Stem
- Producer: April 4th; ATL Jacob; B.A.M.; Bryan Jarrett; CasperDoItAgain; Cubeatz; C$D Sid; DB; DopeBoyzMuzic; Franklin Rodriguez; FRDMade; Hendrix Smoke; Joe Stanley; J.U.S.T.I.C.E. League; KXVI; Macshooter; Paola Barba; Ricky Polo; Solt Boy; TajBeats; TM88; TripiLz; Vincent Macauly

Jeezy chronology
GOATED: Jeezy (2022)	I Might Forgive... But I Don't Forget (2023)

Professional ratings
Review scores
Source	Rating
HipHopDX	3.4/5
laut.de	4/5 stars

I Might Forgive... But I Don't Forget is the thirteenth studio album by American rapper Jeezy. It was released as a double album on November 3, 2023, through CTE New World and Stem Distribution. Production was handled by various producers including ATL Jacob, Cubeatz, J.U.S.T.I.C.E. League and TM88. It is his first album without any features.

== Background ==
On October 31, 2023, Jeezy announced his departure from Def Jam Recordings after 18 years of mutual collaboration. The same day, he announced his next studio album would be a double album.

According to Jeezy himself, the album speaks noticeably about his recent depression.

== Track listing ==
I Might Forgive... track listing
No.	Title	Producer(s)	Length
1.	"I Might Forgive"	Ricky Polo	3:08
2.	"My Name"	Ricky Polo	2:36
3.	"No Complaining" (Jenkins, Pierre Bachelet, Pierre Leroyer)	ATL Jacob; TM88; J.U.S.T.I.C.E. League; Hendrix; SID88; Tony Rey^{[a]}; Franklin Rodriguez^{[a]}	3:06
4.	"They Don't Love Me"	Hendrix; ATL Jacob; Rey^{[a]}; Rodriguez^{[a]}	3:40
5.	"Trust No One"	Ricky Polo; Rey^{[a]}; Rodriguez^{[a]}	2:44
6.	"Sad"	Hendrix; ATL Jacob; Solt Boy; Rey^{[a]}; Rodriguez^{[a]}	2:41
7.	"Couldn't Lose if I Tried"	Ricky Polo	2:44
8.	"Rewrite History"	J.U.S.T.I.C.E. League; Rey^{[a]}; Rodriguez^{[a]}	2:31
9.	"Never Had a Bad Day In My Life"	Ricky Polo; Cubeatz	2:51
10.	"This Too Shall Pass"	Joe Stanley; Ricky Polo; Rey^{[a]}; Rodriguez^{[a]}	2:18
11.	"Don't Deserve Me"	Ricky Polo; Rey^{[a]}; Rodriguez^{[a]}	2:34
12.	"If I'm Being Honest"	J.U.S.T.I.C.E. League; Rey^{[a]}; Rodriguez^{[a]}	2:15
13.	"Don't Cheat" (Jenkins, Christopher Jasper, Ernie Isley, Marvin Isley, O'Kelly Isley, Ronald Isley, Rudolph Isley)	BAM; J.U.S.T.I.C.E. League; Rey^{[a]}; Rodriguez^{[a]}	3:33
14.	"Shine On Me" (Jenkins, Kenneth Gamble, Leon Huff, Bunny Sigler)	DB; Vincent Macauly; Rey^{[a]}; Rodriguez^{[a]}	2:38
15.	"Keep the Change" (Jenkins, Solomon Dykes, Dante Jackson, Ramir Vincent)	Casper; B.; TripiLz; Rey^{[a]}; Rodriguez^{[a]}	3:28

But I Don't Forget track listing
No.	Title	Producer(s)	Length
16.	"Delusional"		4:19
17.	"Nothin to Prove"		2:40
18.	"Titanic" (Jenkins, Greg Dombrowski)		2:46
19.	"Everything About Me Is True"		2:43
20.	"Expectations" (Jenkins, Carl Wolfolk)	J.U.S.T.I.C.E. League; Taj Beats; Rey^{[a]}; Rodriguez^{[a]}	2:39
21.	"Claim to Fame"		3:07
22.	"What I Gotta Do" (Jenkins, LaLa Cope)	J.U.S.T.I.C.E. League; April 4th Beats; Rey^{[a]}; Rodriguez^{[a]}	3:27
23.	"My Intentions"		3:13
24.	"Never Be a Fan" (Jenkins, Robert S. Kelly)		3:05
25.	"Sade" (Jenkins, Jimmy Calhoun, Chandra Currelley-Young)		2:54
26.	"Don't Let Up"	J.U.S.T.I.C.E. League; Dopeboyzmuzic; April 4th Beat; Rey^{[a]}; Rodriguez^{[a]}s	2:24
27.	"Since Pac Died" (Jenkins, Wolfolk)		2:42
28.	"Free Champagne"		3:14
29.	"No Choice"	J.U.S.T.I.C.E. League; Rodriguez; Kxvi; Rey^{[a]}	4:29
Total length:			86:29

All tracks written by Jay Jenkins, except where noted.

All tracks are produced by J.U.S.T.I.C.E. League with additional production from Tony Rey and Franklin Rodriguez, except where noted.

Notes

- ^{^[a]} indicates an additional producer.
- "Don't Cheat" contains excerpts from "Let Me Down Easy", written by Christopher Jasper, Ernie Isley, Marvin Isley, O'Kelly Isley, Ronald Isley, and Rudolph Isley, and performed by the Isley Brothers.
- "Shine on Me" contains excerpts from "I See the Light", written by Kenneth Gamble, Leon Huff, and Bunny Sigler, and performed by Billy Paul.
- "Keep the Change" contains excerpts from "Tap Out", written by Solomon Dykes, Dante Jackson, and Ramir Vincent, and performed by Keke Wyatt.
- "Titanic" contains excerpts from "Valor Is Dead", written and performed by Greg Dombrowski.
- "Everything About Me Is True" contains excerpts from "No Easy Way Out", written and performed by Robert Tepper.
- "Expectations" and "Since Pac Died" contain elements from "Brotherman", written by Carl Wolfolk and performed by the Final Solution.
- "What I Gotta Do" contains excerpts from "Show Me", written by LaLa Cope and performed by Glenn Jones.
- "Never Be a Fan" contains samples from "Life", written by Robert S. Kelly and performed by K-Ci & Jojo.
- "Sade" contains excerpts from "Broken Promises", written by Chandra Currelley-Young and Jimmy Calhoun, and performed by the S.O.S. Band.

== Personnel ==
- Jeezy – vocals
- Colin Leonard – mastering
- Luke Campolieta – mixing
- Tony Rey – engineering (tracks 1–12, 14–18, 20–29)
- Bill Zimmerman – engineering (tracks 13, 19

== Charts ==
Chart performance for I Might Forgive... But I Don't Forget
Chart (2023)	Peak position
US Billboard 200	21
US Independent Albums (Billboard)	5
US Top R&B/Hip-Hop Albums (Billboard)	5
