= Gabriel Hart =

American director (born 1978)

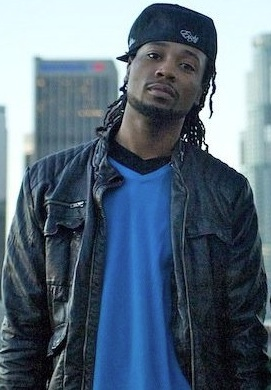
- Born: Gabriel E. Hart; February 14, 1978 (age 48)
- Occupations: Music video director, Film director

Gabriel E. Hart (born February 14, 1978) is a motion picture, music video director and commercial director.

== Career ==
After being denied entry into film school, he became a self-taught editor, screenwriter, producer and director. In 2006, he won an award for Best Music Video in the Urban Mediamakers Film Festival (UMFF) for Evander Holyfield's artist Cuttboy G Dinero's "Waiting For My Season" video. He has directed music videos for Ice Cube, Rocko, Future, B.o.B, Mr. Bangladesh, Ne-Yo and Young Jeezy. In 2011, Gabriel Hart made The Hip Hop 100 - The One Hundred Most Influential People Hiphopblog.com Nominated 2011 BEFFTA Awards, "Atlanta’s household names such as Tyler Perry, Idris Elba, Dwight Eubanks and Gabriel Hart are all BEFFTA Nominees". In 2011 Gabriel Hart went on to receive the 2011 BEFFTA USA Awards, for Best Video Director. He received national press ABC NEWS for the"My President" video he directed for Young Jeezy ft. Nas.

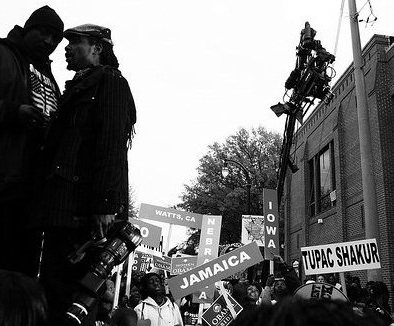
Gabriel Hart Young Jeezy and Tupac Shakur

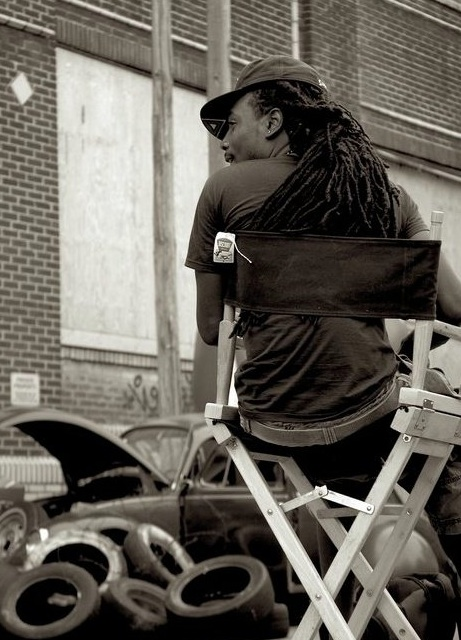
Director Gabriel Hart in a candid moment on set
