= Go Getta =

Single by Young Jeezy featuring R. Kelly

from the album The Inspiration
- Released: January 21, 2007
- Recorded: 2006
- Genre: Hip hop, R&B
- Length: 3:49
- Label: Def Jam
- Songwriters: Allan Felder, Andrew Harr, Norman Harris, Johnny Jackson, Jay Jenkins, Tonya Jones, Robert Kelly, Kevin Cossom
- Producer: The Runners

Young Jeezy singles chronology
"Top Back (Remix)" (2006)	"Go Getta" (2007)	"Dreamin'" (2007)

R. Kelly singles chronology
"That's That" (2006)	"Go Getta" (2007)	"I'm a Flirt" (2007)

"Go Getta" is the second single from Def Jam artist Young Jeezy off his second album The Inspiration, it features singer R. Kelly. The song samples "Born On Halloween" by Blue Magic. It was released in late January. This song was #76 on Rolling Stone's list of the 100 Best Songs of 2007.

The making of the video (directed by Chris Robinson) was featured on BET's Access Granted on February 7, 2007. The Runners, Young Buck, and Slick Pulla made cameos in the video.

== Remixes ==
The official remix appears on the mixtape Young Jeezy Presents USDA: Cold Summer, featuring R. Kelly, Bun B, & Jadakiss. The remix is produced by Drumma Boy.

Several freestyles were also made by Lil Wayne ("N.O. Nigga") and Chamillionaire ("Mo Scrilla").

== Charts ==
=== Weekly charts ===
Chart (2007)	Peak position
US Billboard Hot 100	18
US Hot R&B/Hip-Hop Songs (Billboard)	9
US Hot Rap Songs (Billboard)	3
US Pop 100 (Billboard)	23
US Rhythmic Airplay (Billboard)	13

=== Year-end charts ===
Chart (2007)	Position
US Billboard Hot 100	80
US Hot R&B/Hip-Hop Songs (Billboard)	53

=== Certifications ===
Territory	Certifier	Certification	Sales
United States	RIAA	Platinum	1,000,000
