= Boss Yo Life Up Gang =

Mixtape by Young Jeezy, Doughboyz Cashout and YG
- Released: August 13, 2013
- Recorded: 2013
- Genre: Hip hop
- Label: CTE
- Producers: Cam; Childish Major; C-Gutta; D. Rich; DJ Mustard; DJ Spinz; KinoBeats; Helluva; Mannie Fresh; Montay; The Olympicks; Payroll; Roc and Mayne

Singles from Boss Yo Life Up Gang
- 1. "My Nigga" Released: September 17, 2013; 2. "Mob Life" Released: September 17, 2013

Boss Yo Life Up Gang is a compilation mixtape by American rapper Young Jeezy's record label CTE World. The mixtape was released for free on August 13, 2013, by CTE World. The mixtape featured guest appearances by Nipsey Hussle and Rich Homie Quan. The mixtape was supported by two singles; "My Nigga" by YG featuring Young Jeezy and Rich Homie Quan, and "Mob Life" by Doughboyz Cashout also featuring Jeezy.

== Background ==
In early 2013 Young Jeezy signed Detroit hip hop group Doughboyz Cashout to CTE World. Also after frequently collaborating with West Coast rapper YG, he was officially signed to the label in June 2013. On August 6, 2013, Young Jeezy announced that the label would release a compilation mixtape featuring Jeezy, Doughboyz Cashout, and YG titled Boss Yo Life Up Gang. It was then set for an August 13, 2013 release date. On August 9, 2013, a "making of" video was released in promotion of the project.

The mixtape featured YG, Doughboyz Cashout and Young Jeezy prominently throughout the project, with additional guest appearances by Rich Homie Quan and Nipsey Hussle. The mixtape was also hosted by DJ Drama and Don Cannon. Following its release, Young Jeezy spoke to Revolt TV explaining the mixtape is meant to be "motivational", "Music is all built on motivation. Music was always motivation to hustle, get money [and] do whatever you do and be the best at it. When you get on that court, you want to hear something that motivates you. But when I get in the booth, that’s what I’m thinking, whether it’s for the streets, whether it’s for somebody in the corporate world, whatever it is, it’s all motivation."

== Singles ==
"My Nigga", was originally released as a track on the CTE World EP, #It'sThaWorld. It was then chosen to also appear on, their first official full length mixtape Boss Yo Life Up Gang. On September 4, 2013, YG and Young Jeezy appeared on MTV's RapFix and premiered the music video for "My Nigga", which had been shot a month prior in Atlanta, Georgia. Following the music video's release, the song was released by Def Jam as the mixtape's lead single on September 17, 2013. It has since peaked at number 5 on the Billboard Hot R&B/Hip-Hop Songs chart and at #19 on the Billboard Hot 100, making it YG and Quan's first top 40 hit and their most successful single to date. The song also achieved worldwide success, peaking at #53 in the United Kingdom and #50 in Sweden.

Also on September 17, 2013, "Mob Life" by Doughboyz Cashout featuring Jeezy was released, as the mixtape's second single by Atlantic Records.

== Critical reception ==
Boss Yo Life Up Gang was met with generally mixed reviews from music critics. Jesse Fairfax of HipHopDX gave the mixtape a mixed review saying, "The monolithic tape seems to be one long song about lavish flossing, crass promiscuity, and getting wasted—normally passable topics from emcees capable of some diversity, if not the ability to be both crude and interesting...Constantly shouting out their present miraculous affiliation in likely efforts of stirring up envy, these additions and their utter lack of complexity should only wind up pleasing the easily impressed." Luis Mercado of TheDrop.FM gave a more positive review saying, "Overall, Boss Yo Life Up Gang is a good reintroduction to not only Jeezy, but allows his artists to shine by themselves. Plus, there are solid beats. This project is a perfect way to round out a summer jammed with good music and is worth a listen for any fan of Jeezy and his CTE crew."

== Track listing ==
No.	Title	Producer(s)	Length
1.	"Intro" (Doughboyz Cashout, YG and Young Jeezy)	Childish Major	3:22
2.	"Mo Money" (Doughboyz Cashout)	DJ Spinz	3:38
3.	"Bravo" (Doughboyz Cashout and YG)	Payroll	3:32
4.	"Shame On You" (YG and Payroll featuring Nipsey Hussle)	DJ Mustard	3:44
5.	"Next Bitch" (Doughboyz Cashout, YG and Young Jeezy)	DJ Mustard	3:40
6.	"No Pressure" (Young Jeezy featuring Rich Homie Quan)	D. Rich	3:46
7.	"Goodass Night" (Doughboyz Cashout)	Payroll	4:39
8.	"The Set Up" (BYLUG)	Cassius Jay	0:57
9.	"The Set Up" (Doughboyz Cashout)	DJ Mustard	3:00
10.	"Chris Paul" (Doughboyz Cashout and Young Jeezy)	Cam	3:22
11.	"Fuck Yo Job" (BYLUG)	Roc and Mayne	1:54
12.	"Rub Shoulders" (Doughboyz Cashout featuring Doughboy Clay)	The Olympicks	3:27
13.	"Love My Life" (Doughboyz Cashout)	Helluva	4:55
14.	"Fuck You" (YG and Young Jeezy)	DJ Mustard	2:47
15.	"Talk That" (Young Jeezy)	Childish Major; KinoBeats	3:41
16.	"My Nigga" (YG and Young Jeezy featuring Rich Homie Quan)	DJ Mustard	4:18
17.	"Hope You Have a Good Day" (Young Jeezy featuring Roscoe)	C-Gutta	3:10
18.	"Living My Dream" (Doughboyz Cashout and Young Jeezy)	Montay	5:25
19.	"Outro" (Doughboyz Cashout, YG and Young Jeezy)	Mannie Fresh	3:51
