= Put On =

Single by Young Jeezy featuring Kanye West

from the album The Recession
- Released: June 3, 2008
- Recorded: 2008
- Genre: Hip hop; trap
- Length: 5:21 (album version); 4:19 (radio edit); 4:40 (video version)
- Label: Corporate Thugz; Def Jam
- Songwriters: Jay Jenkins; Christopher Gholson; Kanye West
- Producer: Christopher "Drumma Boy" Gholson

Young Jeezy singles chronology
"Louie" (2008)	"Put On" (2008)	"Out Here Grindin" (2008)

Kanye West singles chronology
"American Boy" (2008)	"Put On" (2008)	"Swagga Like Us" (2008)

Music video
- "Put On" on YouTube

"Put On" is a song by American rapper Young Jeezy featuring Kanye West, from Jeezy's third studio album The Recession. The song was released as the album's lead single on June 3, 2008. The song received a Grammy nomination for Best Rap Performance by a Duo or Group, and was featured in the video games Midnight Club: Los Angeles and Skate 3.

== Background ==
"Put On" was one of seven songs on a beat tape that Drumma Boy had sold to Jeezy. Drumma Boy didn't hear the song or know about West's feature until he heard the song on the radio.

In a 2019 interview with HipHopDX, Jeezy explained how he got West on the song, and was told by Def Jam president L.A. Reid that this would be a single;

"I called him and was like "Yo, I got this record.' And he like, 'I really ain't been in the booth. I was like, 'I get it, but we need you. He called me back in 10 minutes and was rapping the verse on the phone." Jeezy told West to send the song back to him and L.A. Reid. "So before I could call him back, L.A. Reid was calling me at the same time like, 'When are we putting this out? This the single."

== Composition ==
Drumma Boy explained the creation of the beat in a 2018 interview with Billboard;

"I think about the process of making the beat. I remember being at my crib and I was arguing with somebody and pissed off about something. Jeezy just reached out about needing some beats: "I need them yams." I was in the perfect mood. I remember being home alone and it was probably around 3 a.m. and I started making the beat. I turned off all the lights and got the feeling I did when I was a kid walking into the studio for the first time and seeing all the different lights, meters flashing, computer on desktop mode and everything was just a vibe. I rolled up a couple blunts and lit up the first one to get in the zone. The first sounds I played made me feel like I was in The Twilight Zone. When I first made the "Put On" beat, I wanted it to feel like a new anthem for the Chicago Bulls when they came out on the floor. I was thinking about the Bulls anthem with Phil Jackson and Michael Jordan in primetime. I made that beat in 30 minutes and put it into Pro Tools and sent it over to Jeezy fresh off the press."

== Live performances ==
Jeezy and West performed "Put On" at both the 2008 BET Awards and 2008 BET Hip Hop Awards. The two also performed the song during Jeezy's TM101: 10 Year anniversary Concert in 2015. West (Ye) played “Put On” as his walkout song for night 2 of his Chicago homecoming shows

== Music video ==
The music video for "Put On", directed by Gil Green as featuring Amber Rose in one of her first high-profile appearances, premiered on BET's 106 & Park on July 21, 2008. The music video is aimed at the 2008 financial crisis. In the video, silver and black U.S. flags are hung up around neighborhoods and businesses, representing change.

== Remixes and freestyles ==
An official remix featuring rapper Jay-Z was released on July 29, 2008. Jay-Z tried the auto-tune for the phrase, "I Put On" before his verse for a short time and didn't use the effect after that, saying "I don't need no T-Pain."

A freestyle over the production was recorded by Ludacris for his mixtape The Preview. Lil Wayne also recorded a freestyle for his mixtape Dedication 3, featuring Tyga and Gudda Gudda. Another remix was made by Trae tha Truth for one of his mixtapes. Other artists to freestyle over the beat include: Rick Ross, Ace Hood & Plies, Wale and The-Dream.

== Charts and certifications ==
"Put On" debuted at number 36 on the Billboard Hot 100. It eventually peaked at number 12, making it his fourth top 20 hit on the chart. It was also his second song to top the Hot Rap Tracks chart.

=== Weekly charts ===
Weekly chart performance for "Put On"
Chart (2008)	Peak position
Canada Hot 100 (Billboard)	46
US Billboard Hot 100	12
US Hot R&B/Hip-Hop Songs (Billboard)	3
US Hot Rap Songs (Billboard)	1
US Pop 100 (Billboard)	42
US Rhythmic Airplay (Billboard)	8

=== Year-end charts ===
Year-end chart performance for "Put On"
Chart (2008)	Position
US Billboard Hot 100	68
US Hot R&B/Hip-Hop Songs (Billboard)	22
US Rhythmic (Billboard)	39

=== Certifications ===
Certifications for "Put On"
Region	Certification	Certified units/sales
New Zealand (RMNZ)	Gold	15,000^{‡}
United States (RIAA)	3× Platinum	3,000,000^{‡}
United States (RIAA) Mastertone	Platinum	1,000,000^{*}
^{*} Sales figures based on certification alone.^{‡} Sales+streaming figures based on certification alone.
