= Pressure (Jeezy album) =

Studio album by Jeezy
- Released: December 15, 2017
- Recorded: 2017
- Studios: Phoenix Down Studios, (Somerville, MA); The Embassy, (Atlanta, GA); Westlake Studios, (Los Angeles, CA); Bass Recording Studios, (Atlanta, GA); Quad Studios, (New York City, NY)
- Genre: Hip hop
- Length: 44:37
- Labels: YJ; Agency 99; Def Jam
- Producers: Big White; Cardiak; Chigz; D. Rich; DJ Spinking; Djay Cas; Gotti Rock Solid; Frank Dukes; Neenyo; P.C.; Soundsmith Productions; Tone Mason; julius Preston; Vinylz

Jeezy chronology
Trap or Die 3 (2016)	Pressure (2017)	TM104: The Legend of the Snowman (2019)

Singles from Pressure
- 1. "Bottles Up" Released: October 27, 2017; 2. "Cold Summer" Released: November 3, 2017; 3. "This Is It" Released: December 15, 2017

Pressure is the tenth studio album by American rapper Jeezy. It was released on December 15, 2017, by YJ Music, Inc. and Agency 99, under exclusive license to Def Jam Recordings. The album features guest appearances from Kendrick Lamar, J. Cole, 2 Chainz, Puff Daddy and Kodak Black, among others. The album was supported by three official singles: "Bottles Up" featuring Puff Daddy, "Cold Summer" featuring Tee Grizzley and "This Is It".

== Background ==
On November 30, 2017, the album was teased with a trailer via Jeezy's Instagram. The teaser revealed the album's title and release date. The tracklist was later revealed on December 6, 2017.

== Singles ==
The album's lead single, "Bottles Up" featuring Puff Daddy was released on October 27, 2017. The album's second single, "Cold Summer" featuring Tee Grizzley was released on November 3, 2017.

The first and second promotional singles, "Spyder" and "American Dream" featuring J. Cole and Kendrick Lamar were released simultaneously on December 14, 2017.

== Critical reception ==
Professional ratings
Aggregate scores
Source	Rating
Metacritic	66/100
Review scores
Source	Rating
AllMusic	3/5 stars
HipHopDX	3.4/5
Pitchfork	6.3/10

At Metacritic, Pressure received a score of 66 out of 100 from four reviews, indicating "generally favorable reception".

Andy Kellman of AllMusic expressed a mixed response describing the album as a "routine follow up to Trap or Die 3", stating "Jeezy doesn't deviate from his standard set of themes. He's still rhyming about his rise from the bottom, the product he's shifting, and all the disposable wealth and women that have come with it, all the while castigating would-be detractors and snitches".

== Commercial performance ==
Pressure debuted at number six on the US Billboard 200 with 72,000 album-equivalent units, of which 54,000 were pure album sales. It is Jeezy's ninth consecutive US top 10 album since 2005.

== Track listing ==
Credits were adapted from the album's liner notes.

No.	Title	Writer(s)	Producer(s)	Length
1.	"Spyder"	Jay Jenkins; Dwayne Richardson	D. Rich	3:21
2.	"Cold Summer" (featuring Tee Grizzley)	Jenkins; Keith Miller; Terry Wallace; Tupac Shakur; Delmar Arnaud	P.C.	3:01
3.	"In a Major Way" (featuring Payroll Giovanni)	Jenkins; Gerran Adams; Dior Petty	Gotti Rock Solid	2:58
4.	"Floor Seats" (featuring 2 Chainz)	Jenkins; Richardson; Tauheed Epps	D. Rich	3:25
5.	"This Is It"	Jenkins; Anderson Hernandez; Andrew Gradwohl; Gibran Jairam	Vinylz; Big White^{[a]}; DJ Spinking^{[b]}	3:00
6.	"Bottles Up" (featuring Puff Daddy)	Jenkins; Sean Combs; Miller; Paul Beauregard; Ricky Dunigan; Lola Mitchell; Jordan Houston	P.C.	3:00
7.	"Valet Interlude"	Jenkins; Anthony Thompson; Shirleen Aubert; Kevin Grady	Djay Cas	1:57
8.	"Respect"	Jenkins; Adams	Gotti Rock Solid	3:22
9.	"Pressure" (featuring Kodak Black and YG)	Jenkins; Richardson; Dieuson Octave; Keenon Jackson	D. Rich	4:20
10.	"Like Them" (featuring Tory Lanez and Rick Ross)	Jenkins; Sean Seaton; Daystar Peterson; Anthony McIntyre; Adam Feeney	Neenyo; Tone Mason; Frank Dukes^{[a]}; Chigz^{[c]}	3:50
11.	"The Life" (featuring Wizkid and Trey Songz)	Jenkins; Ryan Leslie; Feeney; Carl McCormick; Ayodeji Balogun; Tremaine Neverson	Cardiak; Frank Dukes^{[a]}	4:50
12.	"American Dream" (featuring J. Cole and Kendrick Lamar)	Jenkins; Jermaine Cole; Macintosh Hundal; Bilal Oliver; Dominick Lamb; Keith Fogah; Julius Preston; Jamie McKay; Kendrick Duckworth	Soundsmith Productions	4:09
13.	"Snow Season"	Jenkins; Miller	P.C.	3:24
Total length:				44:37

Notes

- ^{^[a]} signifies a co-producer
- ^{^[b]} signifies an additional producer
- ^{^[c]} signifies an uncredited producer

Sample credits

- "Cold Summer" contains excerpts from "Street Fame", written by Tupac Shakur and Delmar Arnaud, as performed by 2Pac.
- "Bottles Up" contains interpolations from "Tear Da Club Up", written by Paul Beauregard, Ricky Dunigan, Lola Mitchell and Jordan Houston, as performed by Three 6 Mafia.
- "Valet Interlude" contains samples from "For You", written by Shirleen Aubert and Kevin Grady, as performed by Lushus Daim & the Pretty Vain.
- "Like Them" contains a sample from Frank Dukes' original composition "Amby".
- "The Life" contains a sample from Frank Dukes' original composition "Emoboy".
- "American Dream" contains samples from "Flying", written by Bilal Oliver and Dominick Lamb, as performed by Bilal.
- "Snow Season" contains excerpts from "Northern Lights", performed by Stellardrone.

== Personnel ==
Credits were adapted from the album's liner notes.

Performers

- Jeezy – primary artist
- Tee Grizzley – featured artist (track 2)
- Payroll Giovanni – featured artist (track 3)
- 2 Chainz – featured artist (track 4)
- Puff Daddy – featured artist (track 6)
- Kodak Black – featured artist (track 9)
- YG – featured artist (track 9)
- Tory Lanez – featured artist (track 10)
- Rick Ross – featured artist (track 10)
- Wizkid – featured artist (track 11)
- Trey Songz – featured artist (track 11)
- J. Cole – featured artist (track 12)
- Kendrick Lamar – featured artist (track 12)

Technical

- Mike Bozzi – mastering engineer (all tracks)
- John Scott – recording engineer (tracks 1, 2, 4–6, 8, 10, 11, 13), mixing engineer (tracks 1–10, 12, 13)
- Matt Testa – recording engineer (tracks 2, 6)
- Finis "KY" White – recording engineer (track 4)
- Thomas "Tomcat" Bennett – recording engineer (track 10)
- Karl Heilbron – recording engineer (tracks 5, 7, 8, 9, 10, 12)
- Mez – recording engineer (track 12)
- Matt Schaeffer – recording engineer (tracks 3, 12)
- Derek "MixedbyAli" Ali – recording engineer (track 12)
- Derek Garcia – recording engineer (track 9)
- Johann Chavez – recording engineer (track 10)
- Tony Rey – recording engineer (track 11)

Instruments

- Jesse Brotter – bass (track 12)
- John Scott – piano (track 1)
- William Mallard – horn (track 1, 3, 4)
- Dorsey Minns Jr. – horn (track 1, 3, 4)
- Daniel Szczepanski – horn (track 1, 3, 4)
- Ryan Leslie – piano (track 11)

Production

- D. Rich – producer (tracks 1, 4, 9)
- P.C. – producer (tracks 2, 6, 13)
- Gotti Rock Solid – producer (tracks 3, 8)
- Vinylz – producer (track 5)
- Big White – co-producer (track 5)
- DJ Spinking – additional producer (tracks 5, 7)
- Djay Cas – producer (track 7)
- Neenyo – producer (track 10)
- Tone Mason – producer (track 10)
- Frank Dukes – co-producer (tracks 10, 11)
- Cardiak – producer (track 11)
- Soundsmith Productions – producer (track 12)
- Chigz – producer (track 10)

Misc

- Piotr Lato – horn arranger (track 1, 3, 4)

Managerial

- Roland "DJ Folk" Bailey – A&R
- Tab Nkhereanye – A&R
- Leesa D. Brunson – A&R operations
- Terese Joseph – A&R administration
- Brittany Mansfield – A&R coordination
- Agency99 – management
- Rob Caiaffa – marketing
- Angel Martinez – product manager
- Chelsea Donini – digital manager
- Tai Linzie – art production
- Andy Proctor – package production
- Sedlmayr & Associates – legal counsel
- Deborah Mannis-Gardner – clearance agent
- Cindy Zaplachinski – business affairs
- Antoinette Trotman – business affairs
- Ian Allen – business affairs
- Jamie Sudhalter – business affairs
- Vol Davis III – business affairs

== Charts ==
Chart (2017)	Peak position
Canadian Albums (Billboard)	84
US Billboard 200	6
US Top R&B/Hip-Hop Albums (Billboard)	3
