= Cold Summer (U.S.D.A. album) =

Studio album by U.S.D.A.
- Released: May 22, 2007
- Recorded: 2006–2007
- Genres: Southern hip-hop; gangsta rap; hardcore hip-hop
- Label: CTE/Def Jam
- Producers: Drumma Boy, Arnaz "The Nazty One" Smith, Terry "T.A." Allen, Tony Rey, Sanchez "RockHead" Holmes, Midnight Black, The Black Mob, Alfred Gaines Jr., Cliff Brown

Singles from Cold Summer
- 1. "White Girl" Released: 2007; 2. "Corporate Thuggin'" Released: 2007

Professional ratings
Review scores
Source	Rating
AllMusic	3.5/5 stars
HipHopDX	2/5 stars
Pitchfork Media	(4.5/10)
RapReviews	(4.5/10)
Sixshot	(8/10)
DJBooth.net	3.5/5 stars

Cold Summer is the only studio album by American hip-hop trio U.S.D.A. It was released May 22, 2007, on Jeezy's CTE label, which is distributed by Def Jam. The album debuted at No. 4 on the Billboard 200 with approximately 95,000 copies sold in its first week released.

== Background ==
In an interview with MTV, Jeezy explained why he chose not to release a regular studio album to showcase his crew.

"It's crazy," Jeezy said in a statement. "I wanted to do it mix tape-style 'cause I wanted it to be something for the streets. It's like Trap or Die on steroids. I love that. It's a street album, just raw."

== Singles ==
- The lead single is "White Girl", produced by Drumma Boy.
- The second single is "Corporate Thuggin'".

== Track listing ==
#	Title	Producer(s)	Featured guest(s)	Length
1	"Focus"	Black Mob		03:42
2	"White Girl"	Drumma Boy		03:55
3	"Get It Up"	The Nazty One		04:12
4	"Check"	Terry "T.A." Allen		04:12
5	"Corporate Thuggin'"	The Nazty One		03:24
6	"Throw This Money"	Midnight Black		03:41
7	"Pam"	The Nazty One		03:45
8	"Quickie"	Drumma Boy	Allie	03:44
9	"Live My Life"	Tony Rey & Cliff Brown	Scar	03:34
10	"Ride Tonight"	AJ Platinum Tracks		03:44
11	"What It Is"	Terry "T.A." Allen		03:55
12	"I Keep Tellin' Myself"	The Nazty One		03:35
13	"Respect da Shield"	San "Chez" Holmes	Roccett & 211	04:38
14	"Go Getta" (Remix)	Drumma Boy	R. Kelly, Bun B & Jadakiss	03:52

== Charts ==
=== Weekly charts ===
Chart (2007)	Peak position
US Billboard 200	4
US Top R&B/Hip-Hop Albums (Billboard)	1
US Top Rap Albums (Billboard)	1

=== Year-end charts ===
Chart (2007)	Position
US Billboard 200	178
US Top R&B/Hip-Hop Albums (Billboard)	47
