= The Recession 2 =

Studio album by Jeezy
- Released: November 20, 2020
- Recorded: 2020
- Genre: Hip-hop
- Length: 47:46
- Labels: YJ; Agency 99; Def Jam
- Producers: DJ Montay; D Lumar; Don Cannon; Sean Momberger; Cubeatz; Big Korey; Charles Hamilton; Rance; C Gutta; Point Guard; Cassius Jay; J.U.S.T.I.C.E. League; Webb; B-Flat

Jeezy chronology
TM104: The Legend of the Snowman (2019)	The Recession 2 (2020)	Snofall (2022)

Singles from The Recession 2
- 1. "Therapy for My Soul" Released: November 18, 2020

Professional ratings
Review scores
Source	Rating
AllMusic	3.5/5 stars

The Recession 2 is the twelfth studio album by American rapper Jeezy. The album was released on November 20, 2020, by YJ Music, Inc., Agency 99, and Def Jam Recordings. It serves as a sequel to his third album The Recession (2008). The album features guest appearances from Tamika Mallory, Yo Gotti, E-40, Demi Lovato, Lil Duval, Ne-Yo and Rick Ross.

It is Jeezy's final studio album to be released under Def Jam as he fulfilled his contract with the label, parting ways in October 2023.

== Track listing ==
No.	Title	Writer(s)	Producer(s)	Length
1.	"Oh Lord" (featuring Tamika Mallory)	Jay Jenkins; Tamika Mallory; Montay Humphrey; Korey Roberson; Alan Lomax; Vera Hall; Dennis Martin	DJ Montay; D Lumar	3:03
2.	"Here We Go"	Jenkins; Donald Cannon; Sean Momberger; Simon Park	Don Cannon; Sean Momberger	3:00
3.	"Modern Day"	Jenkins; Cannon	Don Cannon	2:58
4.	"Back" (featuring Yo Gotti)	Jenkins; Mario Mims; Cannon; Kevin Gomringer; Tim Gomringer	Don Cannon; Cubeatz	3:08
5.	"Da Ghetto" (featuring E-40)	Jenkins; Earl T. Stevens; Humphrey; Roberson; Jan Branicki; Donny Hathaway; Leroy Hutson	DJ Montay; Big Korey	2:58
6.	"Niggaz"	Jenkins; Charles Hamilton; Larrance Dopson; Darwin Cordale Quinn; Roger Butler	Charles Hamilton; Rance; Lil' C; Point Guard	2:44
7.	"Death of Me"	Jenkins; Erik Ortiz; Kevin Crowe; Keenan Webb; Lou Courtney	J.U.S.T.I.C.E. League; Webb	3:51
8.	"Stimulus Check"	Jenkins; Ortiz; Crowe; Joshua Cross; Robert Dwayne Womack; Linda Womack; Darryl Carter	J.U.S.T.I.C.E. League; Cassius Jay	2:43
9.	"My Reputation" (featuring Demi Lovato and Lil Duval)	Jenkins; Roland Powell; Brian Cook; James Samuel Harris III; Terry Steven Lewis	B-Flat	3:43
10.	"The Glory" (featuring Ne-Yo)	Jenkins; Shaffer Chimere Smith; Cross; Marvin Pentz Gay Jr.; Renaldo Benson; Alfred Cleveland	Cassius Jay	3:10
11.	"Live and Die"	Jenkins; Ortiz; Crowe; Cross; Tupac Shakur; Valaria Marie Young; Quincy Jones	J.U.S.T.I.C.E. League; Cassius Jay	2:59
12.	"Praying Right"	Jenkins; Ortiz; Crowe; Tim van Berkestijn	J.U.S.T.I.C.E. League	3:05
13.	"Therapy for My Soul"	Jenkins; Ortiz; Crowe	J.U.S.T.I.C.E. League	4:17
14.	"Almighty Black Dollar" (featuring Rick Ross)	Jenkins; William Leonard Roberts II; Ortiz; Crowe; John Michael Osbourne; Tony Iommi; Terrence Butler; William Ward	J.U.S.T.I.C.E. League	2:49
15.	"The Kingdom"	Jenkins; Ortiz; Crowe; Cross	J.U.S.T.I.C.E. League; Cassius Jay	3:18
Total length:				47:46

== Charts ==
Chart performance of The Recession 2
Chart (2020)	Peak position
US Billboard 200	19
US Top R&B/Hip-Hop Albums (Billboard)	7
