= Vacation (Young Jeezy song) =

Single by Young Jeezy

from the album The Recession
- Released: August 12, 2008
- Recorded: 2008
- Genre: Hip hop
- Length: 3:46
- Label: Corporate Thugz, Def Jam
- Songwriters: J. Jenkins, Leigh Elliott, Maurice Carpenter
- Producer: The Inkredibles

Young Jeezy singles chronology
"Out Here Grindin" (2008)	"Vacation" (2008)	"I'm So Paid" (2008)

"Vacation" is the second official single from rapper Young Jeezy's album, The Recession.

== Background ==
The song was released on August 12, 2008, on USDA2DAY.com as a countdown to The Recession. Originally "Crazy World" was rumored to be the second single, but it was confirmed that "Vacation" would be the second single. He said that he chose "Vacation" as a single because "I need one, no one ever seen Jeezy have fun."

== Music video ==
The music video was shot in Miami and was directed by Gil Green. Cameos include Rick Ross and Triple C's, Blood Raw, Slick Pulla, Slim Thug, Trey Songz and more. In the video, Jeezy is shown having fun on the beach with the FBI spying on him. He is then shown driving a Ferrari F430 Spider. Later he is at a club, having fun until the FBI cuts in and arrests him. This scene is part of an actual investigation the FBI conducted pertaining to the Black Mafia that police felt Jeezy had ties to.

The video premiered on August 27, 2008, on BET.

== Charts ==
Chart (2008)	Peak position
U.S. Billboard Hot R&B/Hip-Hop Songs	56
U.S. Billboard Hot Rap Tracks	16
U.S. Billboard Mainstream R&B/Hip-Hop	30
