= TM104: The Legend of the Snowman =

Studio album by Jeezy
- Released: August 23, 2019
- Recorded: 2018–2019
- Genre: Hip-hop
- Length: 58:37
- Label: YJ; Agency 99; Def Jam
- Producer: Ashanti “The Mad Violinist” Floyd; Ayo N Keyz; Ben Billions; Bennywond3r; Big Korey; BlaqNmilD; Brick Layer; C Gutta; Chigz; Darknight; DJ Ace; DJ Montay; D Lumar; D. Rich; D-Roc; GIB DJ; Helluva Beats; J.U.S.T.I.C.E. League; Lex Luger; Midnight Black; MP808; Pelham and Junior; Rascal; Sonaro

Jeezy chronology
Pressure (2017)	TM104: The Legend of the Snowman (2019)	The Recession 2 (2020)

Singles from TM104: The Legend of the Snowman
- 1. "1 Time" Released: July 3, 2019; 2. "MLK BLVD" Released: August 13, 2019

TM104: The Legend of the Snowman is the eleventh studio album by American rapper Jeezy. It was released on August 23, 2019, by YJ Music, Inc. and Agency 99 under exclusive license to Def Jam Recordings. The album features guest appearances from Meek Mill, Ty Dolla Sign, CeeLo Green, Rick Ross, Gunna, John Legend and Queen Naija, among others.

== Background ==
Shortly after touring for his previous album Pressure, in early 2018 Jeezy announced on social media that he will retire from rap after the release of "TM104" to pursue a career in acting and to focus on his business ventures.

== Singles ==
The album's lead single, "1 Time", was released on July 3, 2019. The album's second single, "MLK BLVD" featuring Meek Mill, was released to streaming services on August 13, 2019, and was sent to US rhythmic contemporary radio on September 24, 2019.

== Critical reception ==
Professional ratings
Review scores
Source	Rating
AllMusic	3/5 stars
HipHopDX	3.5/5 stars

Fred Thomas of AllMusic expressed a mixed response saying "Approaching 20 years in the game, Jeezy's grizzly voice and boldly evocative lyrics have lost none of their power, though the 18-song album finds him spending as much time encouraging listeners to rise to their potential as he does crafting vivid scenes of rugged street hustling". Eric Diep of HipHopDx gave the album a 3.5 out of 5 stars and noted Jeezy's production selection on the album by saying "Overall, you get a bit of both worlds: Jeezy staying in his lane, but also pushing himself to rap over unlikely production". Diep then concluded in the review by saying "What fans are left with is an album that clearly shows he’s moving on from his decades-long hustle of music to focus on his many business moves."

== Track listing ==
Credits were adapted from the album's liner notes.

No.	Title	Writer(s)	Producer(s)	Length
1.	"The enTRAPreneur"	Jay Jenkins; Terrell McNeal; Darwin Quinn; Ashanti Floyd	C-Gutta; MP808^{[a]}; Ashanti "The Mad Violinist" Floyd^{[b]}	2:35
2.	"Big Shit"	Jenkins; Dwayne Richardson	D. Rich	3:13
3.	"Look Like"	Jenkins; Montay Humphrey; Korey Roberson	DJ Montay	2:51
4.	"Better Tell 'Em"	Jenkins; Humphrey; Roberson; Dennis Martin	DJ Montay; D Lumar^{[a]}; Big Korey^{[b]}	2:22
5.	"Mr. Pyrex"	Jenkins; Richardson	D. Rich	3:03
6.	"Already Rich" (featuring CeeLo Green)	Jenkins; Adam J. Pigott; Thomas DeCarlo Callaway; Priscilla Hamilton; Kevin Crowe; Erik Ortiz	BlaqNmilD; J.U.S.T.I.C.E. League^{[a]}	3:23
7.	"1 Time"	Jenkins; Christopher Cook; Nick Ingman; Arthur Dobson	Sonaro; DJ Ace^{[b]}	3:51
8.	"Oh Yea" (featuring Ball Greezy)	Jenkins; Kinta Cox; Daniel Lebrun	D-Roc; Midnight Black^{[a]}	3:33
9.	"White Keys"	Jenkins; Benjamin Diehl; Rinaldo Rudolf	Ben Billions; Brick Layer^{[a]}	2:37
10.	"MLK BLVD" (featuring Meek Mill)	Jenkins; Robert Williams; Lexus Lewis	Lex Luger	3:22
11.	"'06" (featuring Rick Ross)	Jenkins; William Roberts II; Richardson	D. Rich	3:11
12.	"Don't Make Me"	Jenkins; Diehl; Crowe; Ortiz; Lee Moses	Ben Billions; J.U.S.T.I.C.E. League^{[a]}; Pelham & Junior^{[b]}	2:59
13.	"Fake Love" (featuring Queen Naija)	Jenkins; Queen Bulls; Austin Owens; James Foye III; Isaac Hayes; Desmond Peterson	Bennywond3r; Keyz; Ayo^{[a]}	3:16
14.	"All Night" (featuring Gunna)	Jenkins; Diehl; Sergio Kitchens	Ben Billions	2:54
15.	"4Play" (with Ty Dolla Sign)	Jenkins; Tyrone Griffin Jr.; Martin McCurtis; Joseph Smith; Stephen E. Garrett; Shaffer Smith; Marcus Cooper Sr.; Corey Mathis; Spectacular Smith; Rudy Sandapa; Hurby Azor; Rachel Prager	Helluva Beats	3:47
16.	"Play It Safe" (featuring Noah Scharf)	Jenkins; Noah Scharf; Gibson Alcott	GIB DJ	3:36
17.	"Don't Forget"	Jenkins; Owens; Foye III; Corinne Bailey Rae; Tobias Breuer; Amber Strother; Paris Strother	Ayo; Keyz; Rascal^{[a]}	3:41
18.	"The Real MVP" (featuring John Legend)	Jenkins; Chirag Odedra; Kobe Honeycutt; Jared Azaziah; John Stephens	Chigz; Dark Night	4:23
Total length:				58:37

Notes

- ^{^[a]} signifies a co-producer
- ^{^[b]} signifies an additional producer

Sample credits

- "The enTRAPreneur" contains introducing and closing speech from Gary Vaynerchuk.
- "1 Time" contains a sample from "Under Pressure" by Nick Ingman.
- "Fake Love" contains a sample from "I Love You", performed by Faith Evans.
- "4Play" contains a sample from "On the Hotline", performed by Pretty Ricky.
- "The Real MVP" contains audio excerpts from Kevin Durant's 2014 MVP Award speech.

== Charts ==
Chart (2019)	Peak position
Canadian Albums (Billboard)	85
US Billboard 200	4
