= Jeezy =

American rapper (born 1977)

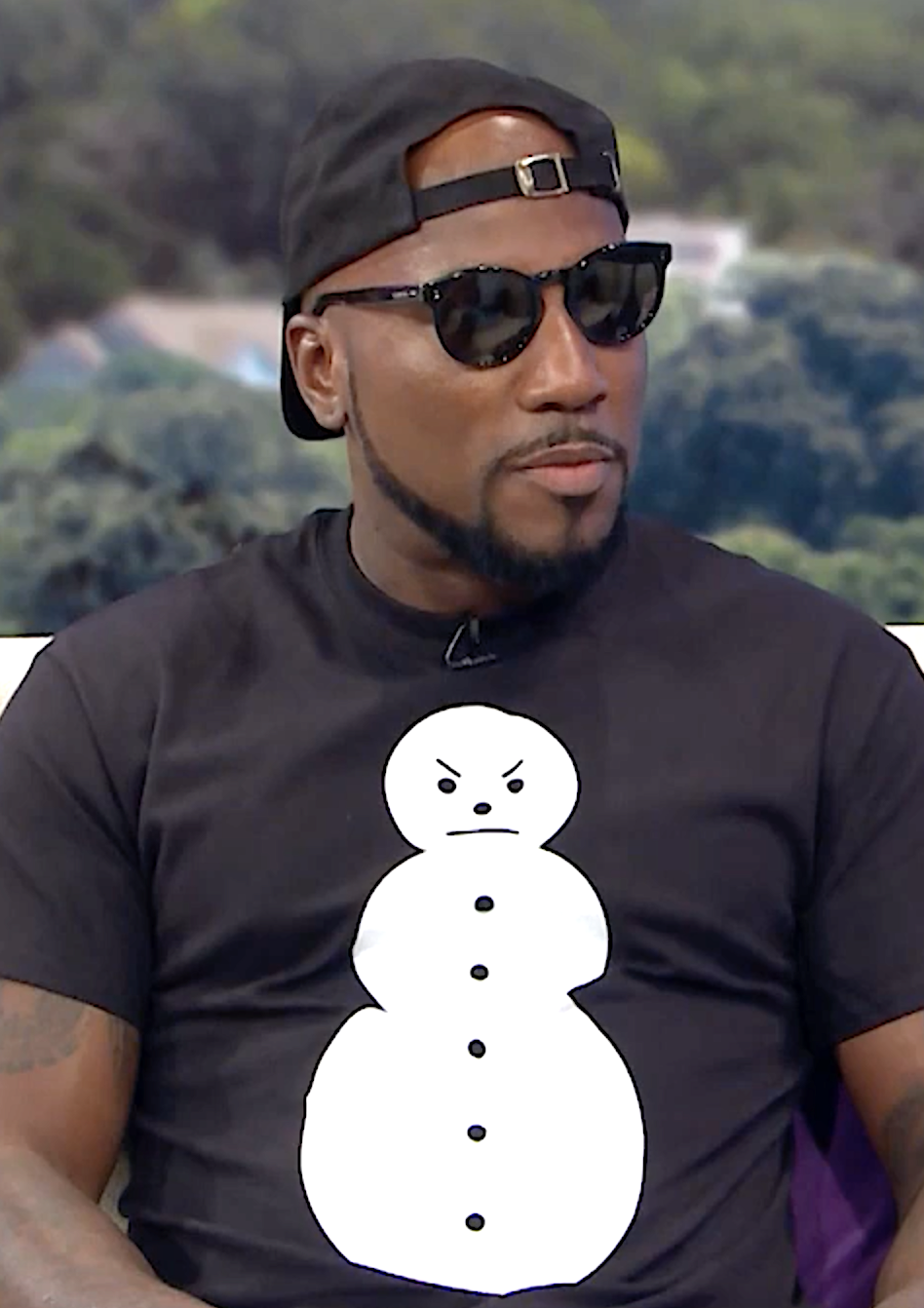
- Jeezy in 2019
- Born: Jay Wayne Jenkins; September 28, 1977 (age 49); Columbia, South Carolina, U.S.
- Other names: Lil' J; Young Jeezy; The Snowman
- Occupations: Rapper; songwriter; record executive; actor; entrepreneur
- Years active: 1997–present
- Spouse: Jeannie Mai (m. 2021; div. 2024)
- Children: 4
- Awards: Full list
- Musical career
- Origin: Atlanta, Georgia, U.S. Hawkinsville, Georgia, U.S.
- Genres: Southern hip-hop; trap; gangsta rap
- Works: Jeezy discography
- Labels: Island Def Jam; Def Jam; Corporate Thugz
- Formerly of: U.S.D.A.; Boyz n da Hood
- Website: jeezyofficial.com

Jay Wayne Jenkins (born September 28, 1977), known by his stage name Jeezy (formerly Young Jeezy), is an American rapper. He is credited, alongside fellow Georgia-based rappers T.I. and Gucci Mane, with pioneering the hip hop subgenre trap music for mainstream audiences. Jenkins began his career in 2001, releasing two independent albums until signing with Def Jam Recordings to release his major label debut, Let's Get It: Thug Motivation 101 (2005). The album peaked at number two on the Billboard 200, sold 172,000 copies in its first week, and received double platinum certification by the Recording Industry Association of America (RIAA); its lead single, "Soul Survivor" (featuring Akon), peaked at number four on the Billboard Hot 100 and remains his highest-charting song.

His second and third albums, Thug Motivation 102: The Inspiration (2006) and The Recession (2008) were met with continued success as both peaked atop the Billboard 200; the latter earned a Grammy Award nomination for its lead single, "Put On" (featuring Kanye West). After three follow-up albums, his ninth, Trap or Die 3 (2016) peaked the chart once more. His other platinum-certified singles include "I Luv It", "Go Getta" (featuring R. Kelly), "My President" (featuring Nas), "Lose My Mind" (featuring Plies), and "Leave You Alone" (featuring Ne-Yo), among others. In addition, Jenkins has guest featured on numerous R&B singles, including "Say I" by Christina Milian, "I'm So Paid" by Akon, "Hard" by Rihanna, and "Love in This Club" by Usher; the latter peaked atop the Billboard Hot 100 in 2008.

Along with his solo career, Jenkins is the de facto leader of the Southern hip hop group United Streets Dopeboyz of America (U.S.D.A.), and a former member of the Bad Boy Records group Boyz n da Hood. His record label, CTE World, was founded in 2001 and has signed artists including YG and Freddie Gibbs.

== Biography ==
=== Early life and career beginnings (1977–2004) ===
Jay Wayne Jenkins was born on September 28, 1977, in Columbia, South Carolina. When he was a toddler, Jenkins relocated to Atlanta, Georgia, where he lived with different family members, as a result of his parents separating. In an interview with XXL magazine, he described his childhood as "empty". At a point in time he lived in Hawkinsville, Georgia, at 600 N Lumpkin. He lived in Macon, Georgia, at an older age, where he befriended many Crip gang members and even affiliated himself with the Crips, and started his affiliation with Kinky B, who helped his musical career.

In 1995, Jeezy spent six months in YCP (Youth Challenge Program), a boot camp in Fort Stewart, Georgia, for narcotics possession. In 1998, Jeezy launched the label imprint CTE World, then known as Corporate Thugz Entertainment.

In 2001, under the name Lil J, Young Jeezy released his first independent album, Thuggin' Under the Influence (T.U.I.),. The album included features from artists Freddy J., Kinky B, Fidank, and Lil Jon, who also produced some of the songs. In 2003, Jeezy independently released Come Shop wit Me, a two-CD set featuring new tracks along with some songs previously released on T.U.I. In 2004, Jeezy signed with Bad Boy Records and joined the group Boyz n da Hood, whose self-titled album was released in June 2005 and peaked at No. 5 on the Billboard 200 album chart.

In May 2004, Jazze Pha's manager, Henry 'Noonie' Lee, showed Jeezy's demo to his friend Shakir Stewart, then Vice President Artist and Repertoire (VP A&R) at Def Jam. Stewart "fell in love with it [the demo] the first time [he] heard it" and took it to L.A. Reid. Reid recognized Jeezy's talent and gave Stewart the green light to sign him. Due to Jeezy's rising popularity, other record labels began pursuing him simultaneously to sign with them, most notably, Warner and Interscope. Ultimately, Jeezy decided he wanted to be in business with Stewart and Reid and signed with Def Jam Records.

=== Let's Get It: Thug Motivation 101 (2005) ===
Jeezy released his major label debut, Let's Get It: Thug Motivation 101, on July 26, 2005. The album debuted at No. 2 on the Billboard 200, selling 172,000 copies in its first week and was later certified Platinum by the RIAA. The debut single off his debut album, "And Then What" featured Mannie Fresh and reached No. 67 on the Billboard Hot 100. The second single off the album, "Soul Survivor" featuring Akon, reached No. 4 on the Billboard Hot 100 and became Jeezy's highest-charting single of his career. The third single, "My Hood", reached No. 77 on the Billboard Hot 100. In an interview with HitQuarters, A&R Shakir Stewart said that Jeezy had recorded over 60 songs for the album.

In interviews and on several records, Jeezy has affirmed his resistance to commercialism in his music. According to Jeezy, maintaining his street credibility, is of the utmost concern to him as an artist. In 2005, Jeezy was featured in several popular hip hop songs including Gucci Mane's "Icy" and Boyz n da Hood's "Dem Boyz". He later left the group after successfully establishing himself as a solo artist.

=== The Inspiration and U.S.D.A. (2006–2007) ===
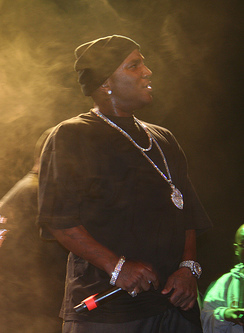
Young Jeezy, 2006

In 2006, Jeezy was featured in Christina Milian's single "Say I". On December 12, 2006, he released his second major label album, The Inspiration. It topped the Billboard 200 with first-week sales of 352,000 copies and went on to be certified Platinum by the RIAA. The album's first single, "I Luv It", peaked at No. 14 on the Billboard Hot 100 and the second single, "Go Getta" featuring R. Kelly, peaked at No. 18.

Jeezy extended himself into gaming, portraying himself in the 3D hip-hop fighting game Def Jam: Icon, released in March 2007. Also in 2007, Jeezy's group U.S.D.A, alongside Blood Raw and Slick Pulla, released their debut album, Cold Summer. The album debuted at number 4 on the Billboard 200, selling 95,000 copies in its first week.

=== The Recession (2008) ===
On September 2, 2008, Jeezy released The Recession, his third studio album and, what would be, his second consecutive number one album. It topped the Billboard 200, selling 260,000 copies in its first week and was later certified gold by the RIAA. The album's lead single, "Put On", featured Kanye West and reached No. 12 on the Billboard Hot 100. The Recession earned Jeezy a Grammy Award nomination for Best Rap performance by a duo. Other singles off the album included "Vacation", "Crazy World", "My President" featuring Nas, and "Who Dat" featuring Shawty Redd. Separately, Jeezy made appearances on Usher's "Love in This Club" and Akon's "I'm So Paid", which was also with Lil Wayne. "Love in This Club" peaked at No. 1 on the Billboard Hot 100. Later, Jeezy performed on Ciara's single "Never Ever", from her album Fantasy Ride.

In the summer of 2008, Jeezy was at the center of a controversy over his choice for president. While he had previously endorsed Barack Obama, during an interview with Vibe, Jeezy spoke about meeting and supporting John McCain. The statement caused a stir, and Jeezy quickly clarified his stance via a viral video. In the four-minute explanation, Jeezy made it clear that Obama was his main choice. "I represent the Democratic party. ... I've never been nor do I ever plan to be a John McCain supporter", the rapper said. "I support Barack Obama."

Jeezy and Jay-Z performed in a concert to celebrate the inauguration of President Obama on January 18, 2009. On The O'Reilly Factor, commentator Bill O'Reilly criticized their performance as a "rant that offended people", but Jeezy responded: "I got white friends. It's nothing like that. I'm a taxpayer, I got a right to voice my opinion at any point in time. I don't think he really understands my struggle."

=== TM:103 Hustlerz Ambition and Its Tha World (2010–2012) ===
It was announced in November 2009 that Jeezy started working on Thug Motivation 103. In March 2010, it was reported that Young Jeezy dropped "Young" from his stage name. Later, Young Jeezy denied the name change and claimed it was just a rumor: However, on the cover for his single "Lose My Mind", his name is printed as "Jeezy". "Lose My Mind" peaked at No. 35 on the Billboard Hot 100.

Nearly two years after first announcing work on Thug Motivation 103, on May 17, 2011, Jeezy released the first single off the album, "Ballin", which features Lil Wayne and peaked at No. 57 on the Billboard Hot 100. On July 22, the second intended single from the album was released, a track called "Shake Life," although it was later scrapped. In July 2011, Jeezy announced a September 20, 2011 release date for Thug Motivation 103. The album was pushed back yet again, this time to December 20, 2011. On September 29, 2011, Jeezy released the third single off Thug Motivation 103, named "F.A.M.E." (Fake Ass Motherfuckers Envy), featuring T.I. The song was T.I.'s first appearance on a song since his release from prison.

On December 20, 2011, Thug Motivation 103 was released. The album debuted at No. 3 on the Billboard 200, selling 233,000 copies in its first week, becoming certified Gold by the RIAA. "I Do" featuring André 3000 and Jay-Z was the album's fourth single. It peaked at No. 61 on the Billboard Hot 100. "Leave You Alone" featuring Ne-Yo, was the album's fifth single and reached No. 51 on the Billboard Hot 100. In 2012, Young Jeezy's "I Do" received a Grammy nomination for Best Rap Performance.

In October 2012, Jeezy released a new single called "Get Right" on iTunes and sent it to radio. Shortly after the single's release, Jeezy confirmed he had plans to release a new mixtape by the end of 2012, as well as a new album in 2013. On December 12, 2012, Jeezy released It's Tha World, the aforementioned mixtape, hosted by DJ Drama. The mixtape features 2 Chainz, Trey Songz, Lil Boosie, Birdman, YG and E-40. Production came from Jahlil Beats, The Renegades, DJ Mustard, Warren G, Mike WiLL Made It, Cardo and Black Metaphor.

=== Boss Yo Life Up Gang, Seen It All: The Autobiography and Church in These Streets (2013–2015) ===
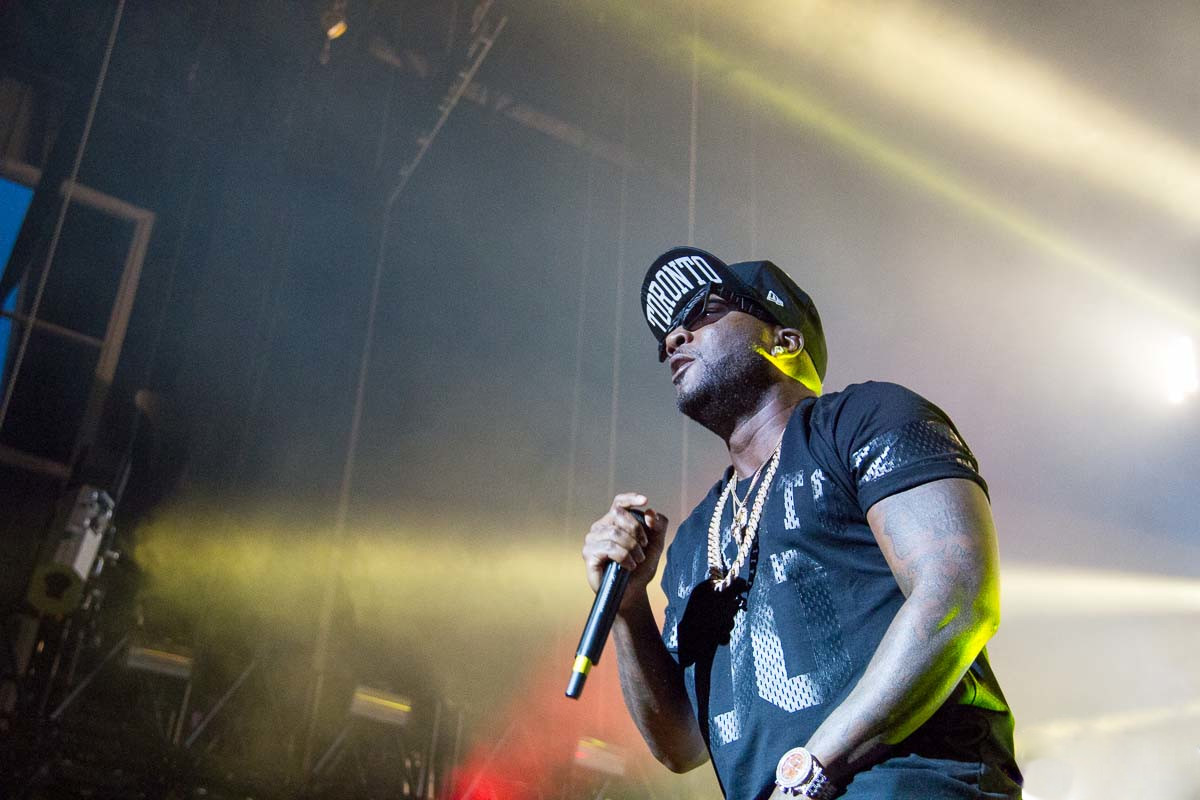
Young Jeezy Performs "Go Getta" and "Soul Survivor", 2014

On August 13, 2013, Young Jeezy released a compilation mixtape titled Boss Yo Life Up Gang with CTE World artists, Doughboyz Cashout and YG . The mixtape has two singles, "My Nigga" by YG and "Mob Life" by Doughboyz Cashout, both featuring Young Jeezy. On September 17, 2013, Jeezy premiered the first single "In My Head", produced by Childish Major, from his CTE collaboration mixtape "Its Tha World 2". The following day he announced plans to release his next album, saying it will more deeply detail his street origins. He revealed that Future, Usher, Ludacris, and Don Cannon would be involved in the album.

On May 30, 2014, Jeezy released the first single "Me Ok" from his upcoming fifth studio album Seen It All: The Autobiography. On July 1, 2014, he released the second single, "Seen It All", featuring Jay-Z. On August 31, 2015, Jeezy announced that he would release a new project entitled Church in These Streets. Four singles were released and the project as a whole came on November 13, 2015. It debuted at No. 4 on the Billboard 200.

=== Trap or Die 3, Pressure, TM104: The Legend of the Snowman and retirement (2016–2019) ===
On October 28, 2016, Jeezy released his new album Trap or Die 3, which became available for pre-order on iTunes earlier that month. It debuted at number one on the Billboard 200, becoming Jeezy's third album to top the chart.

On December 15, 2017, Jeezy released his eighth studio album Pressure, originally titled Snow Season.

On August 23, 2019, Jeezy released his ninth album, TM104: The Legend of the Snowman. It was planned to be his final album, as he wanted to venture into acting at the time.

=== The Recession 2 (2020–2022) ===
On November 20, 2020, Jeezy released his tenth studio album, The Recession 2. As with the original, The Recession, which was released 12 years prior, it is a reflection of the "current times", as Jeezy explained: "It just really inspired me to touch on some of that, but at the same time, motivate my people and give them something to help them through these times and to celebrate, because the shift is happening". The 15-track album features guest appearances from Rick Ross, Ne-Yo, Yo Gotti, E-40, and Demi Lovato, among others. The night before the album's release, Jeezy went live for a Verzuz against rival Gucci Mane. In addition to the album, he announced a limited series podcast called The (Re)Session Podcast.

=== Snofall and Def Jam departure (2022–present) ===
On September 30, 2022, Jeezy announced a mixtape to be released the following month to help fulfill his contract with Def Jam Recordings, the label that housed him for over eighteen years. On October 21, 2022, the mixtape, Snofall, hosted by Gangsta Grillz DJ Drama was released.

On Halloween 2023, Jeezy confirmed via Instagram that his contract with Def Jam has been fulfilled, while announcing a double album titled I Might Forgive, But I Don't Forget, which was released on November 3.

== Personal life ==
After Hurricane Katrina, Jenkins opened his house to victims, offering those who had been displaced from their homes a place to call home.

Jenkins married television personality Jeannie Mai in 2021. The birth of their first child and daughter was announced on January 11, 2022. On September 14, 2023, Jenkins filed for divorce, stating that "the marriage of the parties is irretrievably broken" with "no hope for reconciliation". He is seeking joint legal custody of their daughter. Jenkins has three additional children from previous relationships.

== Legal issues ==
On March 11, 2005, Jenkins was arrested after an alleged shooting with some of his friends in Miami Beach, Florida. He was charged with two counts of carrying a concealed weapon without a permit. Prosecutors dropped the charges two months later due to a lack of evidence.

On June 18, 2008, Jenkins was arrested for DUI in Atlanta.

On April 16, 2013, Brian Smith filed a copyright infringement complaint seeking an injunction, damages, and attorney fees against Jenkins and others in the United States District Court for the Northern District of Georgia, concerning the work Jizzle, which was released in July 2010.

On August 27, 2013, Leroy Hutson, former lead singer of 1970s R&B group the Impressions, filed a complaint against Jenkins and others alleging that Jenkins' song "Time" inappropriately incorporated the instrumental portion of "Getting it On", which was registered with the United States Copyright Office in 1973.

On January 4, 2014, Jenkins was arrested for battery, false imprisonment, and terrorist threats after an alleged fight with his son in September 2012.

On August 24, 2014, Jenkins was arrested before performing at the Irvine, California stop on the Under The Influence Tour in connection with the deadly shooting two days prior in the backstage area, on another stop of the tour in Mountain View, California. When the police raided Jenkins' tour bus, they found an AK-47 military-style assault rifle and guns on several members of his entourage. Six people including Jenkins were arrested, because "no one admitted to owning the assault rifle." His bail was set at one million dollars.

On August 26, 2014, Jenkins and five other men pleaded not guilty to possession of an illegal assault rifle. Two days later, Jenkins and his associates bonded out. Officers were reportedly told repeatedly that the registered owner of the AK-47 was the tour security chief, who was hospitalized at the time.

In 2015, Edaz Redden filed a copyright lawsuit against Jenkins for his single "I Ball, I Stunt", claiming that the entire song was stolen. As a result, Jenkins paid him $111,347.29 for the damages.

== Discography ==
Studio albums

- Thuggin' Under The Influence (T.U.I.) (2001)
- Come Shop Wit Me (2003)
- Let's Get It: Thug Motivation 101 (2005)
- Thug Motivation 102: The Inspiration (2006)
- The Recession (2008)
- TM103: Hustler'z Ambition (2011)
- Seen It All: The Autobiography (2014)
- Church in These Streets (2015)
- Trap or Die 3 (2016)
- Pressure (2017)
- TM104: The Legend of the Snowman (2019)
- The Recession 2 (2020)
- I Might Forgive... But I Don't Forget (2023)

== Filmography ==
- 2009: Janky Promoters
- 2019: I Got the Hook Up 2
- 2024: Trap City

== Awards ==
American Music Awards

Year	Nominee / work	Award	Result
2007	Young Jeezy	Favorite Rap/Hip-Hop Male Artist	Nominated
2007	The Inspiration	Favorite Rap/Hip-Hop Album	Nominated

BET Awards

Year	Nominee / work	Award	Result
2008	"I'm So Hood (Remix)"	Best Collaboration	Nominated
2009	Young Jeezy	Best Male Hip-Hop Artist	Nominated
2010	"Hard" (with Rihanna)	Viewer's Choice	Won

- Note: "I'm So Hood (Remix)" with DJ Khaled, Ludacris, Busta Rhymes, Big Boi, Lil Wayne, Fat Joe, Birdman, & Rick Ross

BET Hip Hop Awards

Year	Nominee / work	Award	Result
2006	Let's Get It: Thug Motivation 101	Hip-Hop CD of the Year	Nominated
2006	Young Jeezy	Hip-Hop MVP of the Year	Nominated
2008	"I'm So Hood (Remix)"	Best Hip-Hop Video	Nominated
2008	"I'm So Hood (Remix)"	Best Hip-Hop Collaboration	Won
2008	"Put On" (featuring Kanye West)	People's Champ Award	Nominated

- Note: "I'm So Hood (Remix)" with DJ Khaled, Ludacris, Busta Rhymes, Big Boi, Lil Wayne, Fat Joe, Birdman, & Rick Ross

Grammy Award

Year	Nominee / work	Award	Result
2009	"Put On" (featuring Kanye West)	Best Rap Performance by a Duo or Group	Nominated
2010	"Amazing" (with Kanye West)	Best Rap Performance by a Duo or Group	Nominated
2011	"Lose My Mind" (featuring Plies)	Best Rap Performance by a Duo or Group	Nominated
2013	"I Do" (featuring Jay-Z and André 3000)	Best Rap Performance	Nominated

Ozone Awards

Year	Nominee / work	Award	Result
2007	The Inspiration	Best Rap Album	Won
2007	"Go Getta" (featuring R. Kelly)	Best Rap/R&B Collaboration	Nominated
2007	"Grew Up a Screw Up" (with Ludacris)	Best Video	Nominated
2007	USDA	Best Group	Nominated
2008	Young Jeezy	Best Rap Artist	Nominated
2008	"Love in This Club" (with Usher)	Best Rap/R&B Collaboration	Won
