= Who Dat (Young Jeezy song) =

Single by Young Jeezy featuring Shawty Redd

from the album The Recession
- Released: December 17, 2008
- Recorded: 2008
- Genre: Trap
- Length: 3:48
- Label: Corporate Thugz, Def Jam
- Songwriter(s): J. Jenkins, D. Stewart, D. Rich
- Producer(s): Shawty Redd, D. Rich

Young Jeezy featuring Shawty Redd singles chronology
"My President" (2008)	"Who Dat" (2008)	"Never Ever" (2009)

"Who Dat" is the fifth single from Young Jeezy's third studio album The Recession. The single features and was produced by Shawty Redd.

== Music video ==
The music video is unlike a normal Young Jeezy video due to most of it being shot from a green screen. It also features a female dance crew and colorful backgrounds. Cameo appearances are made by DJ Khaled, Rick Ross, Ace Hood, Shawty Lo, Lil Scrappy, Gorilla Zoe, Busta Rhymes, Spliff Star, B.G., Yung Joc, Young Buck, Young Noble, E.D.I. Mean, Akon, Jadakiss, DJ Crazy Toones, Ice Cube, WC, Ice Cube's son Doughboy, Fabolous & Rocko.

== Charts ==
Chart (2008–2009)	Peak position
U.S. Billboard Hot R&B/Hip-Hop Songs	49
