= Church in These Streets =

Studio album by Jeezy
- Released: November 13, 2015
- Recorded: 2015
- Genre: Hip hop
- Length: 61:44
- Label: Def Jam
- Producers: Jeezy (exec.); Shakir Stewart (exec.); Steve "Steve O" Carless (co-exec.); Beezo; Blanco The Ear; C4; Cassius Jay; D. Rich; London on da Track; Nard & B; Rance; Southside; Smurf; TM88; Will-A-Fool; XL Eagle; Zaytoven

Jeezy chronology
Seen It All: The Autobiography (2014)	Church in These Streets (2015)	Trap or Die 3 (2016)

Singles from Church in These Streets
- 1. "God" Released: September 4, 2015; 2. "Church in These Streets" Released: September 23, 2015; 3. "Gold Bottles" Released: October 9, 2015; 4. "Sweet Life" Released: October 16, 2015

Church in These Streets is the eighth studio album by American rapper Jeezy. It was released on November 13, 2015, by Def Jam Recordings. The album was supported by four singles: "God", "Church in These Streets", "Gold Bottles" and "Sweet Life" featuring Janelle Monáe.

== Singles ==
On September 4, 2015, the album's first single, "God", was released. On September 23, 2015, the album's second single, "Church in These Streets", was released. On October 9, 2015, the album's third single, "Gold Bottles", was released. On October 16, 2015, the album's fourth single, "Sweet Life" featuring Janelle Monáe, was released.

== Critical reception ==
Professional ratings
Aggregate scores
Source	Rating
Metacritic	69/100
Review scores
Source	Rating
AllMusic	4/5 stars
HipHopDX	3/5 stars
Now	3/5 stars
Pitchfork Media	6.0/10

Church in These Streets received generally positive reviews from music critics. At Metacritic, which assigns a normalized rating out of 100 to reviews from mainstream critics, the album received an average score of 69 based on 5 reviews, which indicates "generally favorable reviews". David Jeffries of AllMusic said, "When taking in a full album, his monotone, bellowing delivery is an acquired taste, and with only a few guest shots, plus a long track list, newcomers might find this big LP a tough go. Regardless, the ambitious Church in These Streets stands with the man's great Thug Motivation 101 while beating that album on artistic merit and meaningful lyrics." Aaron McKrell of HipHopDX stated, "With Church in These Streets, Jeezy has succeeded in staying fresh through six albums. Church in These Streets is a batch of trap-based jams that will inspire its target audience and delight a wide array of listeners." Matthew Ramirez of Pitchfork Media said, "The best Jeezy music often exploited how far he could go with memorable ad libs and punchlines, a triumphant kind of simplicity. Here that gets muted to muddied results."

== Commercial performance ==
Church in These Streets debuted at number four on the US Billboard 200 with 107,000 equivalent album units and first week sales of 98,000 copies in the United States. As of December 2015, Church in These Streets has sold 140,000 copies in the United States.

== Track listing ==
Credits adapted from the album's liner notes.

Church In These Streets
No.	Title	Writer(s)	Producer(s)	Length
1.	"Grind State"	Jay Jenkins; Dwayne Richardson	D. Rich	3:43
2.	"Lost Souls"	Jenkins; Richardson	D. Rich	3:44
3.	"Holy Water"	Jenkins; Joshua Cross	Cassius Jay; Beezo	4:13
4.	"Gold Bottles"	Jenkins; London Holmes	London on da Track	3:12
5.	"Hell You Talkin' Bout"	Jenkins; Holmes	London on da Track	2:31
6.	"Hustlaz Holiday"	Jenkins; James Rosser, Jr.; Brandon Rackley; Willie Byrd	Nard & B; XL Eagle; Will-A-Fool	3:27
7.	"Eternal Reflection (Interlude)"	Jessica Care Moore	Cassius Jay	2:02
8.	"God"	Jenkins; Joshua Luellen; Bryan Simmons; Lionel Nealy; Latasha Williams	Southside; TM88	3:28
9.	"Church in These Streets"	Jenkins; Xavier Dotson	Zaytoven	3:08
10.	"New Clothes"	Jenkins; Rosser, Jr.; Rackley	Nard & B; XL Eagle	3:45
11.	"Sweet Life" (featuring Janelle Monáe)	Jenkins; Rodrequez Yancy; Jonathan Priester; Lorine Chia	C4; Supah Mario	3:42
12.	"Scared of the Dark"	Jenkins; Rosser, Jr.; Rackley	Nard & B	3:39
13.	"No Other Way"	Jenkins; Richardson; Michael Glover	D. Rich	3:33
14.	"Sister Good Game's Testimony"	Jenkins; Rosser, Jr.; Rackley	Nard & B	1:29
15.	"J-Bo"	Jenkins; Rosser, Jr.; Rackley	Nard & B; XL Eagle^{[a]}	3:27
16.	"I Feel Ya"	Jenkins; Rosser, Jr.; Rackley	Nard & B	3:28
17.	"Go Get It (Interlude)"	Jenkins; Cross	Cassius Jay; Blanco The Ear^{[b]}	1:29
18.	"Just Win"	Jenkins; Alden Ellis; Cross; Andrew Hale; Simon Hale	Smurf	3:51
19.	"Forgive Me" (featuring Monica)	Jenkins; Ellis; Larrance Dopson; Charles Hamilton; Christopher Brown	Smurf; Rance^{[a]}; Blanco The Ear^{[b]}	3:53
Total length:				61:44

Notes

- ^{^[a]} signifies a co-producer
- ^{^[b]} signifies a vocal producer
- "God" features additional vocals from Tasha Catour

Sample credits

- "Lost Souls" contains an audio excerpts from the motion picture entitled "Street Life".
- "No Other Way" contains an interpolation from Miami Nights 1984's original composition Astral Projection.
- "Just Win" contains audio excerpts of a motivational speech by Les Brown and a sample of "Main Theme" from L.A. Noire, written by Andrew Hale and Simon Hale.

== Personnel ==
Credits adapted from the album's liner notes.

Performers

- Jeezy – primary artist
- Janelle Monáe – featured artist (track 11)
- Monica – featured artist (track 19)
- Tasha Catour – additional vocals (track 8)

Musicians

- Julian Michael – guitar (tracks 16, 19)

Technical

- Seth Firkins – mixer (tracks 1–3, 6, 8, 9, 10, 12, 13, 15, 16, 18, 19)
- Micah Wyatt – recording engineer (tracks 1, 3, 6, 7, 9–12, 14–16, 18, 19)
- Andres "Muzzy" Solis – recording engineer (tracks 1, 2, 4, 5, 8)
- V12 – recording engineer (tracks 3, 13, 18)
- Miles Walker – mixer (tracks 4, 5)
- Ryan Jumper – assistant mixer (tracks 4, 5)
- Nick Speed – assistant recording engineer (track 7)
- Tony Rey – recording engineer (track 8)
- Leslie Brathwaite – mixer (track 11)

Production

- D. Rich – producer (tracks 1, 2, 13)
- Cassius Jay – producer (tracks 3, 7, 17)
- Beezo – producer (track 3)
- London on da Track – producer (tracks 4, 5)
- Nard & B – producer (tracks 6, 10, 12, 14, 15)
- XL Eagle – producer (track 6, 10), co-producer (track 15)
- Will-A-Fool – producer (track 6)
- Southside – producer (track 8)
- TM88 – producer (track 8)
- Zaytoven – producer (track 9)
- C4 – producer (track 11)
- Supah Mario – producer (track 11)
- Blanco The Ear – vocal producer (tracks 16, 19)
- Smurf – producer (tracks 18, 19)
- Rance – co-producer (track 19)

== Charts ==
=== Weekly charts ===
Chart (2015–16)	Peak position
Canadian Albums (Billboard)	59
US Billboard 200	4
US Top R&B/Hip-Hop Albums (Billboard)	2

=== Year-end charts ===
Chart (2016)	Position
US Billboard 200	158
US Top R&B/Hip-Hop Albums (Billboard)	14
US Rap Albums (Billboard)	9
