= U.S.D.A. (group) =

American hip hop group

- Also known as: United Street Dopeboyz of America
- Origin: Atlanta, Georgia, U.S.
- Genres: Hip hop
- Years active: 2005–2012
- Labels: CTE; Def Jam
- Past members: Jeezy; Blood Raw; Slick Pulla

U.S.D.A. (United Street Dopeboyz of America) was a hip hop group from Atlanta. Rapper Jeezy founded the group after his departure from Boyz n da Hood. The original group consisted of Jeezy, Slick Pulla and Blood Raw.

In 2007, they released their sole album, Cold Summer, under Def Jam Recordings.

After the release of their 2011 mixtape, All or Nothing, U.S.D.A. disbanded in 2012 without any follow up material.

== Discography ==
=== Studio albums ===
Year	Album details	Peak chart positions		
Year	Album details	US	US R&B	US Rap
2007	Cold Summer: First studio album; Release date: May 22, 2007; Label: CTE, Def Jam	4	1	1

=== Singles ===
Year	Song	Chart positions	Album
Year	Song	U.S. R&B	Album
2007	"White Girl"	57	Cold Summer
2007	"Corporate Thuggin'"	109	Cold Summer
