= Shawty Redd =

American record producer

- Born: Demetrius Lee Stewart; June 21, 1981 (age 45)
- Origin: Atlanta, Georgia, U.S.
- Genres: Southern hip hop; trap
- Occupations: Record producer; rapper; songwriter
- Years active: 1997–present
- Labels: Twinn; Beat Bangerz, Inc.; Universal Motown; So So Def; 1017; SHAWTYR3DD, LLC

Demetrius Lee Stewart (born June 21, 1981), better known by his stage name Shawty Redd, is an American record producer and rapper. He is cited as one of the pioneers of the production style which would become synonymous with the trap subgenre.

== Production style ==
Shawty Redd is known for his traditional trap style and ominous, horror-influenced melodies and chord progressions. A good example of this is his production on Trap House and Let's Get It: Thug Motivation 101. He can also compose melodic instrumentals similar to his work on Snoop Dogg's "Sensual Seduction".

== Murder charge ==
In 2010 Redd shot and killed long term collaborator Damon Martin at Redd's house in Atlanta. Redd was charged with murder but acquitted after the judge ruled Redd acted in self defense.

== Awards and nominations ==
Year	Nominee / work	Award	Result	Ref.
2008	"Sensual Seduction"	Grammy Award for Best Rap Song	Nominated	
