= CTE New World =

American hip hop record label

Corporate Thugz Entertainment
- Parent company: The Universal Music Group
- Founded: 2001
- Founder: Kinky B Young Jeezy
- Distributors: Island Def Jam; Def Jam
- Genre: Hip hop
- Country of origin: United States
- Location: Atlanta, Georgia, U.S.
- Official website: cteworld.com

CTE New World (acronym for Corporate Thugz Entertainment, formerly CTE World) is an American record label founded by rapper Jeezy and his former business partner Kinky B in 2001. In December 2012, the label signed a joint venture deal with Atlantic. The label has signed artists including YG, Freddie Gibbs, Blood Raw, Scrilla, and Jeezy's group, USDA. The group's member, Boo Rossini was appointed as the label's president in 2016.

== History ==
Corporate Thugz was launched in 2001 by Young Jeezy and his business partner, Kinky B. The label independently released two albums in 2001 and 2003, Young Jeezy's Thuggin' Under the Influence (T.U.I.) and Come Shop wit Me, respectively.

In May 2004, Jazze Pha's manager, Henry 'Noonie' Lee, showed Jeezy's demo to his friend Shakir Stewart, then Vice President Artist and Repertoire (VP A&R) at Def Jam. Stewart "fell in love with it [the demo] the first time [he] heard it" and took it to L.A. Reid. Reid recognized Jeezy's talent and gave Stewart the green light to sign him. Due to Young Jeezy's rising popularity, other record labels began pursuing him simultaneously to sign with them, most notably, Warner Music and Interscope. Ultimately, Jeezy decided he wanted to be in business with Stewart and Reid and signed himself and Corporate Thugz to Def Jam Recordings and The Island Def Jam Music Group. The following year, he released his 1st major label studio album Let's Get It: Thug Motivation 101. Then in 2006 he released his 2nd major label studio album The Inspiration and in 2007 formed the rap group United Streets Dopeboyz of America (USDA) and signed Slick Pulla, Blood Raw, 211, JW and Boo Rossini to Corporate Thugz and released his label's 3rd studio album and USDA's debut studio album Young Jeezy Presents USDA: Cold Summer. In 2008 Young Jeezy released The Recession.

In 2011, Young Jeezy signed Freddie Gibbs, Tone Trump, and Scrilla to Corporate Thugz. Freddie Gibbs left Corporate Thugz in late 2012, and after leaving the label Gibbs said "Anything he (Young Jeezy) tells you is fake." This laid the groundwork for Gibbs's album ESGN and the diss records directed at Jeezy. On New Year's Eve 2012 Scrilla announced that he had asked for and received his release from Corporate Thugz, and that there were no hard feelings. First action in the new imprint deal with Atlantic, Craig Kallman and Jeezy named Steven "Steve-O" Carless as A&R of Atlantic and President of Corporate Thugz. In early 2013 Young Jeezy signed Detroit hip hop group Doughboyz Cashout and later that year West Coast rapper YG was added to the record label. On August 13, 2013, the label released a compilation mixtape featuring Jeezy, Doughboyz Cashout, and YG titled Boss Yo Life Up Gang. The mixtape was supported by the singles "My Nigga" by YG and "Mob Life" by Doughboyz Cashout, both featuring Young Jeezy. On November 20, 2013 Young Jeezy and Corporate Thugz via Twitter announced he had signed the label to Roc Nation.

== Notable artists ==
- Blood Raw (2005–09)
- Freddie Gibbs (2011–2012)
- Scrilla (2011–2012)
- Tone Trump
- Doughboyz Cashout (2013–2016)
- YG (2013–2017)

== Discography ==
- Thuggin' Under the Influence (T.U.I.) (2001) by Jeezy
- Come Shop wit Me (2003) by Jeezy
- Let's Get It: Thug Motivation 101 (2005) by Jeezy
- Thug Motivation 102: The Inspiration (2006) by Jeezy
- Cold Summer (2007) by U.S.D.A.
- My Life: The True Testimony (2008) by Blood Raw
- The Recession (2008) by Jeezy
- Lord Giveth, Lord Taketh Away (2011) by Freddie Gibbs
- The After Party (2011) by U.S.D.A.
- Thug Motivation 103 (2011) by Jeezy
- Boss Yo Life Up Gang (2013) by CTE World
- My Krazy Life (2014) by YG
- Seen It All: The Autobiography (2014) by Jeezy
- Church In These Streets (2015) by Jeezy
- Still Brazy (2016) by YG
- Blow Talk (2017) by Boston George
- Baking Soda Boston: Tha Bricktape (2019) by Boston George
- TM 104 (2019) By Jeezy
- Baking Soda Boston 2 (2020) By Boston George
