= Lil Scrappy discography =

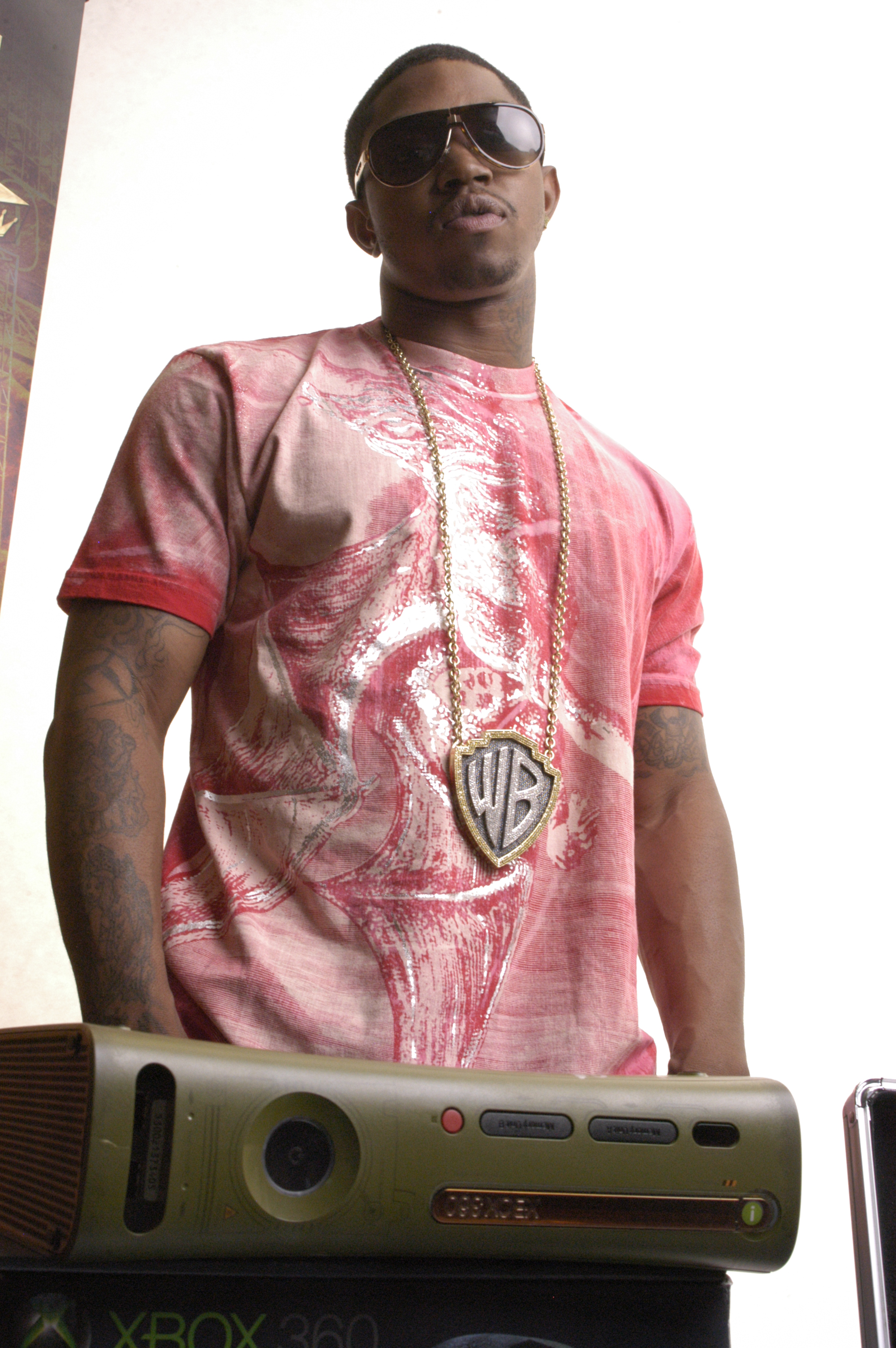
Lil Scrappy in 2007

This is the discography of American rapper Lil Scrappy.

== Albums ==
=== Studio albums ===
List of albums, with selected chart positions
Title	Album details	Peak chart positions			
Title	Album details	US	US Ind.	US R&B	US Rap
Bred 2 Die Born 2 Live	Released: December 5, 2006; Label: G-Unit, BME, Asylum, Reprise, Warner Bros.; Format: CD, digital download	24	—	5	3
Prince of the South	Released: May 3, 2008; Label: Real Talk; Format: CD, digital download	—	28	22	6
Prince of the South 2	Released: October 19, 2010; Label: Real Talk; Format: CD, digital download	—	—	—	—
Tha Gru$tle	Released: June 26, 2012; Label: G'$ Up, S-Line, Bonzi, Fontana, Format: CD, digital download	188	—	—	—
Confident	Released: June 8, 2018; Label: X-Ray Records, Cleopatra Records, Inc.; Format: CD, digital download	—	—	—	—
"—" denotes a recording that did not chart.

=== Collaborative albums ===
List of albums, with selected chart positions and certifications
Title	Album details	Peak chart positions			Certifications
Title	Album details	US	US R&B	US Rap	Certifications
Trillville & Lil Scrappy (with Trillville)	Released: February 24, 2004; Label: BME, Reprise, Warner Bros.; Format: CD, digital download	12	3	8	RIAA: Gold
Silence & Secrecy: Black Rag Gang (with G'$ Up)	Released: February 24, 2009; Label: G'$ Up; Format: CD, digital download	—	—	—	
"—" denotes a recording that did not chart.

=== Mixtapes ===
- 2005: Full Metal Jacket (Hosted by DJ Don Cannon)
- 2006: Still G'd Up (Hosted by Big Mike)
- 2006: Expect the Unexpected (Hosted by DJ Don Cannon)
- 2006: G's Up (Hosted by DJ Drama)
- 2006: Money In The Bank (G's Up Pt.2) (Hosted by DJ Smallz)
- 2007: My Piggy Bank (Hosted by DJ Ulix)
- 2007: G-Street: The Street Album (Hosted by DJ Don Cannon)
- 2008: The Grustle (With G's Up) (Hosted by DJ Holiday)
- 2009: The Shape Up! (Hosted by DJ Don Cannon and DJ Infamous)
- 2010: On Point (Hosted by DJ Dirty Money)
- 2010: Suicide (Hosted by DJ Scream)
- 2010: Dat's Her? She's Bad (Hosted by Greg Street)
- 2011: Tha Merlo Jonez EP (Hosted by DJ Smallz)
- 2012: Full Metal Jacket 2 (Hosted by DJ Scream & DJ J1)
- 2013: Grustling 101 (with Rolls Royce Rizzy)
- 2015: Merlo's Way (Hosted by DJ Smallz)
- 2017: Hopeless Romantic

== Singles ==
=== As lead artist ===
List of singles, with selected chart positions and certifications, showing year released and album name
Title	Year	Peak chart positions			Certifications	Album
Title	Year	US	US R&B	US Rap	Certifications	Album
"Head Bussa" (featuring Lil Jon)	2003	—	73	—		Trillville & Lil Scrappy
"No Problem"	2004	29	10	8		Trillville & Lil Scrappy
"Money in the Bank (Remix)" (featuring Young Buck)	2006	28	7	5	RIAA: Platinum	Bred 2 Die Born 2 Live
"Gangsta, Gangsta" (featuring Lil Jon)	2006	—	—	—		Bred 2 Die Born 2 Live
"Oh Yeah (Work)" (featuring Sean P and E-40)	2007	— (Note: "Oh Yeah (Work)" did not enter the Billboard Hot 100, but peaked at number 13 on the Bubbling Under Hot 100 chart, which acts as a 25-song extension to the Hot 100.)	60	20		Bred 2 Die Born 2 Live
"Livin' in the Projects"	2007	—	— (Note: "Livin' in the Projects" did not enter the R&B/Hip-Hop Songs chart, but peaked at number eight on the Bubbling Under R&B/Hip-Hop Songs chart, which acts as a 25-song extension to the R&B/Hip-Hop Songs chart.)	—		Bred 2 Die Born 2 Live
"Addicted to Money" (featuring Ludacris)	2009	—	96	—		Non-album singles
"Look Like This" (featuring Gucci Mane)	2009	—	—	—		Non-album singles
"Bad (That's Her)" (featuring Stuey Rock)	2010	—	46	25		Non-album singles
"Helicopter" (featuring 2 Chainz and Twista)	2011	—	—	—		Tha Grustle
"No Love" (featuring Toccara)	2012	—	— (Note: "No Love" did not enter the R&B/Hip-Hop Songs chart, but peaked at number 23 on the Bubbling Under R&B/Hip-Hop Songs chart, which acts as a 25-song extension to the R&B/Hip-Hop Songs chart.)	—		Tha Grustle
"Paws"	2013	—	—	—		Non-album single
"Worried"	2015	—	—	—		Merlo's Way
"Sucka 4 Luv" (featuring Bobby V)	2016	—	—	—		Non-album singles
"They Don't Love You"	2018	—	—	—		Non-album singles
"Scrappy"	2018	—	—	—		Non-album singles
"MJ" (featuring Stevie J)	2018	—	—	—		Non-album singles
"Pull Up" (with Spice featuring Neutron the God)	2024	—	—	—		Non-album singles
"—" denotes a recording that did not chart.

=== As featured artist ===
List of singles, with selected chart positions, showing year released and album name
Title	Year	Peak chart positions			Album
Title	Year	US	US R&B	US Rap	Album
"Neva Eva" (Trillville featuring Lil Scrappy and Lil Jon)	2003	78	28	22	Trillville & Lil Scrappy
"What U Gon' Do" (Lil Jon & The East Side Boyz featuring Lil Scrappy)	2004	22	13	8	Crunk Juice
"Knuck If You Buck" (Crime Mob featuring Lil Scrappy)	2004	78	28	23	Crime Mob
"I'm a King" (P$C featuring Lil Scrappy)	2005	67	16	14	25 to Life
"Rock Yo Hips" (Crime Mob featuring Lil Scrappy)	2007	30	8	5	Hated on Mostly
"All I Know" (GS featuring Lil Scrappy)	2012	—	—	—	Non-album single
"Embellish" (Coach Peake featuring Lil Scrappy)	2018	—	—	—	TBA

== Guest appearances ==
List of non-single guest appearances, with other performing artists, showing year released and album name
Title	Year	Other performer(s)	Album
"Go For Dat"	2004	DMX	Never Die Alone
"Bitch Niggaz"	2004	Trillville	Trillville & Lil Scrappy
"Wait (The Whisper Song)" (Remix)	2005	Ying Yang Twins, Busta Rhymes, Missy Elliott, Free, Mr. Collipark	U.S.A. (United State of Atlanta)
"Bang"	2005	Young Jeezy, T.I.	Let's Get It: Thug Motivation 101
"Black Tee"	2005	Gucci Mane, Bun B, Young Jeezy, Killer Mike, Jody Breeze	Trap House
"Southside"	2005	Game	Coach Carter (soundtrack)
"Xcuse Me Shawty"	2005	YoungBloodZ	Ev'rybody Know Me
"I'm a King (Remix)"	2005	P$C, T.I.	Hustle & Flow (soundtrack)
"Pussy Niggaz"	2005	E-40, Bohagon	Hustle & Flow (soundtrack)
"Shake"	2005	Trina	Glamorest Life
"Never Be Nothing Like Me"	2006	DJ Khaled, Homeboy	Listennn... the Album
"Don't Sleep"	2006	2Pac, Yaki Kadafi, Nuttso, Stormy	Pac's Life
"U Scared"	2006	Tyrese, David Banner	Alter Ego
"4 Corners"	2006	Bow Wow, Pimp C, Short Dawg, Lil Wayne	The Price of Fame
"Come And Catch Me"	2006	Young Buck, All Star Cashville Prince	Case Dismissed – The Introduction of G-Unit South
"Pockets Stay Fat"	2006	Ice Cube	Laugh Now, Cry Later
"Big Problems"	2006	DJ Kay Slay, Lil' Flip, Lil Jon, Lil Wyte	The Champions: North Meets South
"Go to War"	2007	Crime Mob, Pimp C	Hated on Mostly
"Grillz Gleamin'"	2007	DJ Drama, Bohagon, Diamond, Princess	Gangsta Grillz: The Album
"I'm Still a Problem"	2008	J-Bo	Atl's Finest
"Final Warning"	2008	DJ Khaled, Rock City, Bun B, Blood Raw, Ace Hood, Brisco, Bali, Shawty Lo	We Global
"Stop and Stare"	2009	Drumma Boy, Rick Ross, Pastor Troy	Welcome II My City
"Everybody Drunk"	2010	Ludacris	Battle of the Sexes
"All Day"	2012	Lotto	Dollars & Dreams
"Do the Drunk Walk"	2012	Hypnotiq, AG, Wildstyle	—N/a
"Body Bag Remix"	2012	Hypnotiq, Rolls Royce Rizzy	—N/a
"She Down"	2012	Rolls Royce Rizzy	God Got Me
"Wait Till You See Me"	2012	Jarvis	Heartache

== Music video cameos ==
- 2003: "Never Scared" (Bone Crusher feat. T.I. and Killer Mike)
- 2003: "Get Low" (Lil Jon & the East Side Boyz feat. Ying Yang Twins)
- 2004: "Let Me In" (Young Buck feat. 50 Cent)
- 2004: "1, 2 Step" (Ciara feat. Missy Elliott)
- 2004: "Toma" (Pitbull feat. Lil Jon)
- 2004: "Okay" (Nivea feat. Lil Jon and YoungBloodZ)
- 2005: "Candy Shop" (50 Cent feat. Olivia)
- 2005: "Twist It" (Olivia feat. Lloyd Banks)
- 2005: "And Then What" (Young Jeezy feat. Mannie Fresh)
- 2006: "Tell Me When To Go" (E-40 feat. Keak Da Sneak)
- 2006: "I Luv It" (Young Jeezy)
- 2006: "Rock Yo Hips" (Crime Mob)
- 2007: "Get Buck" (Young Buck)
- 2007: "Circles" (Crime Mob)
- 2009: "Born An OG" (Ace Hood feat. Ludacris)
