= Death Before Dishonor (album) =

Studio album by 2 Pistols
- Released: June 17, 2008
- Recorded: 2007–08
- Studio: Hot Beats Recording Studios (Atlanta, GA); J.U.S.T.I.C.E. League Studios (Atlanta, GA); Music Matrix Recording Studios (Tampa, FL); The Boom Boom Room (Los Angeles, CA); Untitled Music and Media (Richmond, VA)
- Genre: Hip hop
- Length: 54:54
- Label: Universal Republic Records
- Producer: Bolo Da Producer; Coni' Cone; D.A. Got That Dope; Honorable C.N.O.T.E.; J.U.S.T.I.C.E. League; Yung Chill

Singles from Death Before Dishonor
- 1. "She Got It" Released: January 8, 2008; 2. "You Know Me" Released: May 27, 2008

Death Before Dishonor is the debut studio album by American rapper 2 Pistols. It was released on June 17, 2008, through Universal Republic Records. Recording sessions took place at Hot Beats Recording Studios and J.U.S.T.I.C.E. League Studio in Atlanta, Music Matrix Recording Studios in Tampa, Florida), The Boom Boom Room in Los Angeles, and Untitled Music and Media in Richmond, Virginia. Production was handled by J.U.S.T.I.C.E. League, Honorable C.N.O.T.E., Bolo Da Producer, Coni' Cone, D.A. Got That Dope and Young Chill. It features guest appearances from Blood Raw, BMU, Ray J, Slick Pulla, Tay Dizm, T-Pain, Trey Songz and Tyra B. The album debuted at number 32 on the Billboard 200, number 10 on the Top R&B/Hip-Hop Albums and number 6 on the Top Rap Albums chart in the United States.

The album was preceded with two singles: "She Got It" and "You Know Me". Its lead single, "She Got It", peaked at No. 24 on the Billboard Hot 100 and No. 9 on the Hot R&B/Hip-Hop Songs, while "You Know Me" reached only No. 38 on the Rhythmic chart in the US. A version of "Candy Coated Diamonds" featuring Fergie (instead of Tyra B) leaked on various the Black Eyed Peas fansites.

== Critical reception ==
Professional ratings
Review scores
Source	Rating
AllMusic	3/5 stars
HipHopDX	2/5
Los Angeles Times	1/4 stars
PopMatters	3/10
RapReviews	4/10
XXL	3/5

Death Before Dishonor received mixed reviews from music critics. AllMusic editor David Jeffries was mixed towards the album, praising the J.U.S.T.I.C.E. League's production but felt there were less quality street tracks to give it enough quality, concluding with "way too little, way too late to call this a compelling debut, but just like any given Ross album, Death Before Dishonor has singles to spare and enough of that Florida flavor to keep fans happy". Pedro Hernandez of RapReviews criticized the album for having nondescript party tracks with faceless production and 2 Pistols for only having the basics of hip-hop content, concluding that "if you absolutely love this type of rap and already ran through the good stuff, 2 Pistols might be something to hold you over. For all others, Death Before Dishonor is about as enjoyable as having '2 Pistols' and no ammo".

== Track listing ==
No.	Title	Writer(s)	Producer(s)	Length
1.	"Intro"	Kevin Crowe; Erik Ortiz	J.U.S.T.I.C.E. League	0:59
2.	"Death Before Dishonor"	Jeremy Saunders; E. Moorman; Carlton Mays	Honorable C.N.O.T.E.	2:08
3.	"She Got It" (featuring T-Pain and Tay Dizm)	Saunders; Faheem Najm; Artavious Smith; Crowe; Ortiz	J.U.S.T.I.C.E. League, Bolo Da Producer	4:34
4.	"Been Throwin Money"	Saunders; Moorman; Mays	Honorable C.N.O.T.E.	3:49
5.	"Gettin Money Mane"	Saunders; Crowe; Ortiz	J.U.S.T.I.C.E. League	4:28
6.	"Let's Ride"	Saunders; Richard Preston Butler Jr.; Crowe; Ortiz	J.U.S.T.I.C.E. League	3:37
7.	"Flexx 2008"	Brian Thompson; Clifton Dillon; Ewart Brown; Lowell Dunbar; Handel Tucker; Leroy Romans	J.U.S.T.I.C.E. League	3:50
8.	"Eyes Closed"	Saunders; Crowe; Ortiz	J.U.S.T.I.C.E. League	3:49
9.	"Phone (Skit)"			0:21
10.	"You Know Me" (featuring Ray J)	Saunders; Carlyle Anderson; Crowe; Ortiz	J.U.S.T.I.C.E. League	3:36
11.	"We Run It" (featuring Slick Pulla and Blood Raw)	Saunders; Renaldo Whitman; Bruce Falson; Crowe; Ortiz	J.U.S.T.I.C.E. League	4:00
12.	"That's My Word (Intro)"			0:31
13.	"That's My Word" (featuring Trey Songz)	Saunders; Crowe; Ortiz; Anderson	J.U.S.T.I.C.E. League	3:26
14.	"Robbery"	Saunders	Coni' Cone	3:15
15.	"Lookin Down on Em" (featuring BMU)	Saunders; Moorman; Timothy Mingo	Bolo "Da" Producer	4:37
16.	"Candy Coated Diamonds" (featuring Tyra B)	Saunders; David Doman	D.A. On The Track Man	3:42
17.	"From the Bottom"	Saunders; Moorman; Crowe; Isaac Yowman	Yung Chill	4:12
Total length:				54:54

Sample credits

- Track 7 contains a sample of recording "Flex" as performed by Mad Cobra.

== Personnel ==
- Jeremy "2 Pistols" Saunders – vocals, co-executive producer
- E. "Young Chu" Moorman – additional background vocals (tracks: 2, 4, 15)
- Faheem "T-Pain" Najm – vocals (track 3)
- Artavious "Tay Dizm" Smith – vocals (track 3)
- Carlyle Anderson – additional background vocals (tracks: 3, 10, 13)
- Ja$mine Conner – additional background vocals (track 6)
- Dane'sha Bullard – additional background vocals (track 6)
- Pashoke "Shooks" Dowe – additional background vocals (track 7)
- Corey "Prime" Harrison – additional background vocals (tracks: 8, 12)
- Sarah Cadle – vocals (track 9)
- William "Ray J" Norwood Jr. – vocals (track 10)
- Renaldo "Slick Pulla" Whitman – vocals (track 11)
- Bruce "Blood Raw" Falson – vocals (track 11)
- Sarah Roman – vocals (track 12)
- Tremaine "Trey Songz" Neverson – vocals (track 13)
- Tyra Bolling – vocals (track 16)
- Ashanti Floyd – additional violins (track 1)
- Kevin "Colione" Crowe – producer (tracks: 1, 3, 5–8, 10, 11, 13), recording (tracks: 3, 5, 8, 10), mixing (tracks: 1–8, 10, 11, 14–17), arranger (track 1), executive producer
- Erik "Rook" Ortiz – producer (tracks: 1, 3, 5–8, 10, 11, 13), recording (tracks: 3, 5, 8, 10), mixing (tracks: 1–8, 10, 11, 14–17), arranger (track 1), executive producer
- Carlton "Honorable C.N.O.T.E." Mays Jr. – producer (tracks: 2, 4)
- Coni' Cone – producer (track 14)
- Timothy "Bolo" Mingo – producer (track 15)
- David "d.a. got that dope" Doman – producer (track 16)
- Isaac "Yung Chill" Yowman – producer (track 17)
- Sly "Piper" Jordan – vocal producer (track 10)
- Finis White – recording (tracks: 1, 2, 4, 7, 11, 13, 15, 17)
- Vincent Absher – recording (tracks: 6, 13–16)
- Amzi Jackson – recording (track 16)
- Leslie Brathwaite – mixing (tracks: 10, 13)
- Justin Trawick – mixing assistant (tracks: 10, 13)
- Glenn Schick – mastering
- Jonathan Mannion – photography
- Gillian Russell – A&R
- Imran Majid – A&R
- Nicole Morgan – creative coordinator
- Andre Grell – marketing coordinator
- Elise Wright – product management
- Sandra Brummels – VP of creative
- Traci Carter – stylist
- Imani "Manny" Halley – management
- Matt Couloute Jr. – legal
- James McMillan – legal
- Angela Rogers – legal
- Jerry Juste – legal
- Eric Weissman – sample clearance

== Charts ==
Chart (2008)	Peak position
US Billboard 200	32
US Top R&B/Hip-Hop Albums (Billboard)	10
US Top Rap Albums (Billboard)	6
