= Blood Raw discography =

This is the discography for American rapper Blood Raw.

== Albums ==
=== Studio albums ===
List of albums, with selected chart positions and certifications
Title	Album details	Peak chart positions		
Title	Album details	US	US R&B	US Rap
My Life: The True Testimony	Released: June 17, 2008; Label: CTE, Def Jam; Format: CD, digital download	29	5	3
Raw Redemption	Released: October 9, 2012; Label: Big Cat; Format: CD, digital download	—	40	—

== Singles ==
=== As lead artist ===
List of singles, with selected chart positions and certifications, showing year released and album name
Title	Year	Peak chart positions			Album
Title	Year	US	US R&B	US Rap	Album
"Louie" (featuring Young Jeezy)	2008	—	69	—	My Life: The True Testimony

== Guest appearances ==
- 2006: "Gangsta Shit" (DJ Khaled featuring U.S.D.A. and Bun B)
- 2006: "Keep It Gangsta" (Young Jeezy featuring Slick Pulla and Blood Raw)
- 2007: "26 Inches" (Young Buck featuring Blood Raw)
- 2008: "We Run It" (2 Pistols featuring Slick Pulla and Blood Raw)
- 2008: "Final Warning" (DJ Khaled featuring Rock City, Ace Hood, Blood Raw, Bali, Lil Scrappy, Shawty Lo, Brisco, and Bun B)
- 2008: "My Life" (Chopper City Boyz featuring Blood Raw)
- 2009: "Stupid Money" (Young Buck featuring Jimmie Hoffa and Blood Raw)
- 2009: "Something Else (Remix)" (Jadakiss featuring Young Jeezy, Snyp Life, Bully, AP, Boo Rossini & Blood Raw)
- 2009: "Everybody Do It" (Young Buck featuring Blood Raw and Sosa Tha Plug)
