= Juju on That Beat (TZ Anthem) =

2016 single by Zay Hilfigerrr & Zayion McCall

Single by Zay Hilfigerrr & Zayion McCall

from the album Why So Serious?
- Released: September 30, 2016
- Recorded: 2016
- Genre: Hip-hop; trap
- Length: 2:24
- Label: Crunk Incorporated; Atlantic
- Songwriters: Tyjuan Peoples; James McCall; Jonathan Lewis; Brittany Carpentero; Christopher Henderson; Venetia Lewis; Alphonce Smith; Jarques Usher
- Producer: Lil' Jay

Music video
- "JuJu On That Beat" on YouTube

"Juju on That Beat (TZ Anthem)" (also known simply as "Juju on That Beat", "Juju on the Beat" and "Juju on dat Beat") is a song and dance by American hip-hop duo Zay Hilfigerrr & Zayion McCall. The song was originally posted to McCall's YouTube channel on July 8, 2016, as a track from his mixtape Why So Serious?, where it received over 18,000 views. It was posted to his channel again on August 11, 2016, where it received over 45 million views. The song became a viral dance challenge and peaked at number 5 on the Billboard Hot 100.

== Background ==
Hilfigerrr (born Tyjuan Peoples) began his career on social media platforms, making videos of raps, dances, and comedic skits. His stage name is an homage to Tommy Hilfiger; "Zay" is a self-applied nickname. Hilfigerrr was approached by Timothy McCall, a local film producer, whose son, James McCall, is also a rapper. McCall, who took the alias Zayion, worked with Hilfigerrr to create the song "Juju on That Beat"; the entire song is a freestyle over the beat of the song "Knuck If You Buck" by Atlanta hip hop group Crime Mob featuring Lil' Scrappy.

== Success ==
The song went viral after members of the dancing group Fresh the Clowns began uploading videos of themselves dancing to it on social media. Atlantic Records picked up the song for official distribution in 2016, and it eventually reached #5 on the Billboard Hot 100. By February 2017, the song had been streamed on YouTube over 150 million times, by which time Hilfigerrr was 16 years old. In the version initially released by Hilfigerrr and McCall, the track was only 2:02 in length, one of the shortest songs to hit the Billboard Hot 100 in the past forty years. However, the Atlantic Records reissue was 2:23 in length.

== Aftermath ==
Hilfigerrr and McCall had appearances on Live with Kelly on October 19, 2016 (with guest host Ciara), where they performed the song and gave instructions on the dance moves and on Halloween day on October 31, 2016, on The Ellen DeGeneres Show. The song was also nominated for a Kids' Choice Award for Favorite Music Video. After the group's appearance at the Kids' Choice Awards, Hilfigerrr briefly disappeared from public view, and was reported as a runaway before resurfacing. The duo had no follow-up hit and largely disappeared from the music industry in the wake of "Juju On That Beat"'s success.

In October 2026, Hilfigerrr made a public statement alleging that his mother and Atlantic Records had mismanaged the profits from his childhood success, and that he had not received royalties from the song.

== Music video ==
On November 2, 2016, the music video for "Juju on That Beat" was uploaded to Zay and Zayion's YouTube channel, The ZayNetwork, where it received over 495 million views. The video is potentially based on the film Neighbors. In it, Zay and Zayion move into a suburban neighborhood and host a dance party in their front yard. The video won the 2017 Kids Choice Award for Favorite Music Video.

== Charts ==
Chart (2016–17)	Peak position
Australia (ARIA)	26
Austria (Ö3 Austria Top 40)	69
Belgium (Ultratip Bubbling Under Flanders)	11
Belgium (Ultratip Bubbling Under Wallonia)	22
Canada Hot 100 (Billboard)	13
Czech Republic Singles Digital (ČNS IFPI)	96
France (SNEP)	120
Germany (GfK)	53
Ireland (IRMA)	43
Netherlands (Single Top 100)	48
New Zealand (Recorded Music NZ)	24
Portugal (AFP)	43
Scottish Singles Sales (Official Charts)	41
Sweden (Sverigetopplistan)	56
Switzerland (Schweizer Hitparade)	67
UK Singles (Official Charts)	37
US Billboard Hot 100	5
US Pop Airplay (Billboard)	30
US Hot R&B/Hip-Hop Songs (Billboard)	3
US Rhythmic Airplay (Billboard)	20

=== Year-end charts ===
Chart (2016)	Position
US Hot R&B/Hip-Hop Songs (Billboard)	50
Chart (2017)	Position
US Billboard Hot 100	63
US Hot R&B/Hip-Hop Songs (Billboard)	30

== Certifications ==
Region	Certification	Certified units/sales
Australia (ARIA)	Gold	35,000^{‡}
Canada (Music Canada)	Platinum	80,000^{‡}
France (SNEP)	Gold	100,000^{‡}
New Zealand (RMNZ)	Platinum	30,000^{‡}
United Kingdom (BPI)	Silver	200,000^{‡}
United States (RIAA)	2× Platinum	2,000,000^{‡}
^{‡} Sales+streaming figures based on certification alone.
