= I Do (Young Jeezy song) =

Single by Young Jeezy featuring Jay-Z and André 3000

from the album Thug Motivation 103: Hustlerz Ambition
- Released: January 10, 2012
- Recorded: 2006–2011
- Genre: Hip hop
- Length: 5:12 (album version); 6:32 (version with Drake)
- Label: Corporate Thugz; Def Jam
- Songwriters: Jay Jenkins; Shawn Carter; André Benjamin; Joshua Banks
- Producer: M16

Young Jeezy singles chronology
"F.A.M.E." (2011)	"I Do" (2012)	"Leave You Alone" (2012)

Jay-Z singles chronology
"Gotta Have It" (2011)	"I Do" (2012)	"Glory" (2012)

André 3000 singles chronology
"Play the Guitar" (2011)	"I Do" (2012)	"DoYaThing" (2012)

"I Do" is the fourth single from Young Jeezy's fourth studio album Thug Motivation 103: Hustlerz Ambition. The single features Jay-Z and André 3000. It was produced by M16. It is built around a sample of Lenny Williams 1979 song "Let's Talk It Over". The song was nominated for the Best Rap Performance at the 55th Grammy Awards.

== Background ==
"I Do" was initially recorded by André 3000 as a song for his debut solo album. Then it was given to Young Jeezy while recording The Inspiration, but was later replaced with "I Luv It". André 3000's verse was leaked onto the Internet back in 2010 and remains on the final version of the song, which is featured on Young Jeezy's Thug Motivation 103: Hustlerz Ambition. Around mid-November 2011, "I Do" was leaked onto the Internet in its entirety, which was produced by M16 Beats. Even before its official release it appeared on several U.S. charts. On the Billboard Hot 100 it entered at number 61. On the Billboard R&B/Hip-Hop Songs chart it has climbed to number 4. It also charted on the Billboard Rap Songs chart, making it to number 9.

== Remix ==
Rappers Yelawolf and Los have recorded freestyles over I Do, and a remix featuring an additional verse by rapper Drake was released on February 10, 2012. Drake performed a part of his verse at the 2010 Juno Awards with Justin Bieber, who was performing an acoustic remix version of his song "Baby". Jeezy also said that he had been waiting on Kanye West to record a verse to it, but it was never done.

== Charts ==
Chart (2012)	Peak position
US Billboard Hot 100	61
US R&B/Hip-Hop Songs (Billboard)	4
US Rap Songs (Billboard)	9

== Release history ==
Country	Date	Format
United States	December 20, 2011	Digital download
United States	January 10, 2012	Urban radio
