= J.U.S.T.I.C.E. League =

American hip hop group

Background information
- Origin: Tampa, Florida, U.S.
- Genre: Hip hop
- Occupation: Record producers-Rappers
- Years active: 2004–present
- Members: Erik "Rook" Ortiz; Kevin "Colione" Crowe
- Website: luxurysoundsociety.com

J.U.S.T.I.C.E. (Just Undeniably Some of The Illest Composers Ever) League is an American record production team and rappers composed of producers and instrumentalists from Tampa, Florida.

The group is made up of members Erik "Rook" Ortiz and Kevin "Colione" Crowe. The group takes their name from the DC Comics superhero team the Justice League. The distinctive producer tag of a J.U.S.T.I.C.E. League production has a female voice echoing the words "Justice League" twice at the beginning of most of their songs. They have a Grammy Award for Best R&B Album for their work on Mary J. Blige's The Breakthrough (2006).

== Discography ==
=== Studio albums ===
- J.U.S.T.I.C.E for All (2016)

=== Mixtapes ===
- The Grammy Kidsss (2009)

== Production credits ==
=== 2005 ===
Blood Raw featuring T-Pain Ain't Nothing In My Way

- Young Jeezy - Let's Get It: Thug Motivation 101

13. "Don't Get Caught"

- Mary J. Blige - The Breakthrough

01. "No One Will Do"

- Juelz Santana - What the Game's Been Missing!

02. "Rumble Young Man Rumble"

=== 2006 ===
- J. R. Writer - History In The Making

09. "Riot Pump"

- Shawnna - Block Music

09. "Can't Break Me" (Featuring Buddy Guy)

- Shareefa - Point of No Return

03. "U Told Me"
07. "Butterfly"

- Young Jeezy - The Inspiration

10. "Bury Me a G"
00. "We Jook"

- Tyra B

00. "Baby"

- Plies

00. "100 Percent Real N*gga"

- Acafool

00. "I Look Joel Traudes Good"

=== 2007 ===
- Rico Love - The 5th Element

00. "It's OK"

- J. Holiday - Back of My Lac'

14. "Fallin"
18. "City Boy"
19. "Good for Each Other" (Japan Bonus Track)

- Young Buck - Buck the World

03. "Buss Yo Head"
00. "Do It Myself"

- Lil' Scrappy

00. "Addicted To Money"

=== 2008 ===
- 2 Pistols - Death Before Dishonor

01. "Intro"
03. "She Got It" (featuring T-Pain & Tay Dizm)
05. "Gettin' Money Mane"
06. "Let's Ride"
07. "Flex 2008"
08. "Eyes Closed" (featuring Young Jeezy)
10. "You Know Me" (featuring Ray J)
11. "We Run It" (featuring Slick Pulla & Blood Raw)
12. "That's My Word" (Intro)
13. "That's My Word" (featuring Trey Songz)

- 2 Pistols

00. "Blinded"
00. "The Way I Live" (featuring Sean Kingston)

- B.G. - Too Hood 2 Be Hollywood

00. "I Hustle" (featuring Young Jeezy)

- Big Kuntry King - My Turn to Eat

04. "We Iz"

- Blood Raw - My Life: The True Testimony

09. "Get Away"

- C-Ride

00. "Hustlin' Pressure" (featuring Kevin Cossom)

- Certified

00. "Turn Off The Lights" (featuring Pleasure P)

- Dave Young

00. "Drinking, Smoking" (featuring 50 Cent)

- Jackie Chain

02. "About Me"

- Rick Ross - Trilla

01. "Intro"
11. "Maybach Music" (featuring Jay-Z)
12. "Billionaire"
13. "Luxury Tax" (featuring Lil Wayne, Trick Daddy and Young Jeezy)

- Rocko - Self-Made

14. "Karma"

- Young A.C.

00. "The Flyest"

- Young Jeezy - The Mixtape Monster

14. "Rock Song"

- Young Jeezy - The Recession

11. "Word Play"
20. "Done It All" (Bonus Track)

=== 2009 ===
- Rick Ross - Deeper Than Rap

02. "Maybach Music 2" (feat. T-Pain, Lil Wayne & Kanye West)
03. "Magnificent" (feat. John Legend)
04. "Yacht Club" (feat. Magazeen)
07. "Rich Off Cocaine" (feat. Avery Storm)

- Maino - If Tomorrow Comes...

08. "Here Comes Trouble"

- Fabolous - Loso's Way

04. "Feel Like I'm Back"

- Ghostface Killah - Ghostdini: The Wizard of Poetry in Emerald City

08. "Guest House" (feat. Fabolous)

- Donnis - Diary Of An Atlanta Brave (Presented by 10.Deep)

02. "Country Cool"
06. "I Am Me" (feat. Colin Munroe)
07. "Here To Stay" (feat. Marsha Ambrosius)
08. "Sexytime"
11. "Ticket To The Moon"

- Wale - Attention: Deficit

16. "Center Of Attention" (Bonus Track)

- Gucci Mane - The State vs. Radric Davis

14. "Volume" (feat. Wooh da Kid)
00. "Atlanta Everything" (feat. Yung Joc, Lil Scrappy, Gorilla Zoe & Lil Boosie)

- B.G. - Too Hood 2 Be Hollywood

17. "I Hustle" (feat. Young Jeezy)

- Lil Scrappy - Tha Grustle

00. "Addicted To Money" (feat. Ludacris)
00. "Addicted To Money (Remix)" (feat. Young Dro, Gorilla Zoe, OJ Da Juiceman, Rick Ross, Ace Hood & Gucci Mane)

- Mary J. Blige - Stronger withEach Tear

13. "Brand New" (iTunes Pre-Order Only Bonus Track)

=== 2010 ===
- Lil Wayne - Rebirth

09. "Runnin' (feat. Shanell)"
11. "Knockout (feat. Nicki Minaj)"
00. "Girls Forever"

- Drake

00. "Zone"
00."Baby Come With Me"
00."Paris Morton Music" (Re-release 2019 in Care Package)

- K-os - The Anchorman Mixtape

03. "Faith" feat. Drake

- Carlos Ferragamo

00. "Baby, I'm Back"

- Trina -Amazin'

09. "By Myself"

- Plies - Goon Affiliated

02. "Rob Myself"
14. "All I Know"
21. "My Girl"

- Bun B - Trill O.G.

02. "Trillionaire" feat. T-Pain
13. "All a Dream" feat. LeToya Luckett
00. "Don't Go"

- Laws - 5:01 Overtime

01. "Overtime"
14. "Flashback"
21. "Runaway"

- Rick Ross - Teflon Don

01. "I'm Not a Star"
04. "Maybach Music III " feat. T.I., Jadakiss & Erykah Badu
10. "Aston Martin Music" feat. Drake & Chrisette Michele

- Big Remo - Entrapment

13. "It's Like That"

- Lloyd Banks - H.F.M. 2 (The Hunger for More)

12. "I Don't Deserve You" (featuring Jeremih)

- Keyshia Cole - Calling All Hearts

02. "Long Way Down"

- Kandi - Kandi Koated

02. "I Want You"

- T.I. - No Mercy

00. "Pledge Allegiance to the Swag" feat. Rick Ross (Bonus Track)

=== 2011 ===
- Ace Hood - Blood, Sweat & Tears

05. "Body 2 Body" (feat. Chris Brown)

- Chris Brown - Boy In Detention

08. "Leave the Club" (Feat. Joelle James)

- Tech N9ne - All 6's And 7's

09. "Strangeland"
11. "The Boogieman" (feat. First Degree The D.E. & Stokley Williams of Mint Condition)

- Jay Rock - Follow Me Home

05. "Hood Gone Love It" (feat Kendrick Lamar)
15. "Finest Hour" (feat. Rick Ross & BJ the Chicago Kid)

- Yelawolf - Radioactive

11. "Write Your Name" (feat. Mona Moua)

- Young Jeezy - Thug Motivation 103: Hustlerz Ambition

10. "Trapped" (feat. Jill Scott)
11. "F.A.M.E." (feat. T.I.)

- Freddie Gibbs - Cold Day in Hell

01. "Barely M.A.D.E it" (feat. BJ The Chicago Kid)
03. 187 Proof

- Mobb Deep - Black Cocaine

07. "Street Lights" (feat. Dion Primo)

- Keyshia Cole - Calling All Hearts

02. "Long Way Down"

=== 2012 ===
- Rick Ross - Rich Forever

08. "Triple Beam Dreams" (feat. Nas)

- MGK - Half Naked & Almost Famous

03. "See My Tears"

- Curren$y - The Stoned Immaculate

04. "Take You There" (feat. Marsha Ambrosius)
10. "That's The Thing" (feat. Estelle)

- Elle Varner - Conversational Lush

05. "Runaway"

- Nas - Life is Good

01. "No Introduction"

- Rick Ross - God Forgives, I Don't

05. "Maybach Music IV" (feat. Ne-Yo)
06. "Sixteen" (feat. André 3000)
15. "Ten Jesus Pieces" (feat. Stalley)
16. "Triple Beam Dreams" (feat. Nas) (Deluxe Edition bonus track)

- Slaughterhouse - On the House

05. "Ya Talkin"

- DJ Khaled - Kiss the Ring

07. "Hip Hop" (feat. Scarface, Nas, and DJ Premier)

- 211 - Product of the Block 2 (mixtape)

12. "Air bound" (feat. Omarion)
13. "On my way" (feat. Glasses Malone)

- Slaughterhouse - Welcome To: Our House

19. "The Other Side (Deluxe Edition bonus track)"

- Travis Porter – From Day 1

10. "That Feeling" (feat. Mike Posner)

=== 2013 ===
- Maybach Music Group

00. "Oil Money Gang" (Rick Ross feat. Jadakiss)

- Dj Khaled – Suffering from Success

05. "Blackball" (feat. Future, Plies, Ace Hood)

- Don Trip - Help Is On The Way

04. "Break"

- Nelly - M.O.

07. "All Around The World" (feat. Trey Songz)

- 2 Chainz - B.O.A.T.S. II: Me Time

11. "So We Can Live" (featuring T-Pain) (Part II)

=== 2014 ===
- Rick Ross - Mastermind

16. "Thug Cry" (featuring Lil Wayne)

- Carlos Ferragamo - Shades of Blue 2.5

00. "Sober Thoughts"

- GQ - Rated Oakland

11. "Rated Oakland" (produced with 8 Bars)

- Euro - July

01. "Paris Morton Music" (freestyle)

- Marsha Ambrosius - Friends & lovers

03. Night Time

- K. Michelle - Anybody Wanna Buy A Heart?

09. "Miss You, Goodbye"

=== 2015 ===
- Estelle – True Romance

08. "Silly Girls"

- Ludacris – Ludaversal

11. "Ocean Skies" (featuring Monica)

- MGK - General Admission

03. "Till I Die"

- PnB Rock - RnB 3

09. "Ain't Me"

- Rick Ross - Black Dollar

01. "Foreclosures"
07. "Icon" (featuring Anthony Hamilton)

=== 2016 ===
- Termanology - More Politics

03. "Looking Back" (feat. Crushboys) Co-produced by Royce Music Group

- Lloyd - Tru (EP)

01. "Tru" Co-produced by Boi-1da
05. "Tru" (feat. 2 Chainz) Co-produced by Boi-1da

=== 2017 ===
- Raekwon - The Wild

14. "Purple Brick Road" (feat. G-Eazy)

- Royce da 5'9" - The Bar Exam 4

21. "Stay Down"

- Rob Markman - Write to Dream

01. "I Don't Wanna Wait" (feat. Kirby Maurier)

- Wiz Khalifa - Laugh Now, Fly Later

04. "Plane 4 U"

- PnB Rock - Catch These Vibes

05. "Lovin'" (feat. A Boogie wit da Hoodie) Co-produced by 8 Bars, Jake One, G Koop

=== 2018 ===
- Trevor Jackson - Rough Drafts, Pt. 1

11. "How That Sound"

- Masspike Miles

00. "Sober"

=== 2019 ===
- Jeezy – TM104: The Legend of the Snowman

06. "Already Rich" (featuring Ceelo Green) (Co-Produced by Blaqnmild)
12. "Don’t Make me" (Co-produced by Ben Billions and Pelham & Junior)

- Rick Ross - Port of Miami 2

13. "Vegas Residency"
14. "Maybach Music VI"

- Drake - Care Package

16. "Paris Morton Music"

=== 2020 ===
- 4-IZE - Look Into My Ize

2. Shit On Deez Niggaz (featuring Ludacris, Mistah F.A.B., Number 2 and Headkrack)

- Bizzy Crook - Dios Mio

00. Dios Mio

=== 2021 ===
- Nate Joël - KIDS AT HEART - EP

01. "GIFT FROM GOD"
02. "CALL ME WHEN YOU NEED ME"
03. "DAY & AGE"
04. "GUILT"
05. "RIGHT DIRECTION"

=== 2022 ===
- Conway the Machine - God Don't Make Mistakes

09. "So Much More"

- Freddie Gibbs - $oul $old $eparately

09. "Rabbit Vision"

=== 2025 ===
- Conway the Machine - You Can't Kill God with Bullets

02. "The Lightning Above The Adriatic Sea"

=== Upcoming projects ===
- K-os - BLack On BLond

00. "Faith (Part 2)" feat. Drake

- Amerie - Cymatica Vol. 1

00. Untitled

- Ashley Breathe - OVERDOSE

00. "Ground Zero"

- Nipsey Hussle - "¡Hussle"

00. "New Money"

- Fabri Fibra - Guerra E Pace

17. "Centoquindici"

- STS9 - " Untitled New Album"
- Cris Streetz (J.U.S.T.I.C.E. League artist)
- Anes (J.U.S.T.I.C.E. League artist)

== Awards ==
=== 2007 ===
- Billboard - R&B hip-hop album of the year: "The Breakthrough," Mary J. Blige
- Grammy - Best R&B album "The Breakthrough," Mary J. Blige

=== 2009 ===
- ASCAP- 2 Pistols "She Got It"
