= All White Everything =

Single by Young Jeezy

from the album TM103 Hustlerz Ambition (intended)
- Released: July 6, 2010
- Recorded: 2010
- Genre: Trap
- Length: 4:17
- Label: Def Jam
- Songwriters: Jay Jenkins, Demetrius Stewart, Dwayne Richardson
- Producers: Shawty Redd, D. Rich

Young Jeezy singles chronology
"Lose My Mind" (2010)	"All White Everything" (2010)	"Jizzle" (2010)

"All White Everything" is a song by American rapper Young Jeezy.

== Music video ==
The music video for "All White Everything" was directed by TAJ Stansberry, and was released on August 2, 2010.

== Remixes ==
The official remix of "All White Everything" features Memphis rapper Yo Gotti in July 2010.

== Charts ==
=== Weekly charts ===
Chart (2010)	Peak position
US Billboard Hot 100	57
US Hot R&B/Hip-Hop Songs (Billboard)	15
US Hot Rap Songs (Billboard)	13

=== Year-end charts ===
Chart (2010)	Position
US Hot R&B/Hip-Hop Songs (Billboard)	80

== Release history ==
Country	Date	Format
United States	July 2, 2010	Digital download
