= Addicted to Money =

Single by Lil Scrappy featuring Ludacris

from the album Tha Grustle (intended)
- Released: September 8, 2009
- Genre: Hip hop
- Length: 5:00
- Label: Disturbing tha Peace, G'$ Up, Def Jam
- Songwriters: Darryl Richardson, Christopher Bridges, Erik Ortiz, Kevin Crowe
- Producer: J.U.S.T.I.C.E. League

Lil Scrappy singles chronology
"Rock Yo Hips" (2006)	"Addicted to Money" (2009)	"Look Like This" (2009)

Ludacris singles chronology
"How Do You Sleep?" (2009)	"Addicted to Money" (2009)	"Bulletproof" (2009)

"Addicted to Money" is the song by American rapper Lil Scrappy. It features fellow American rapper Ludacris. The music video was shot in Atlanta, Georgia. This song was also performed at the 2009 BET Hip Hop Awards.

== Charts ==
Chart (2009)	Peak position
US Billboard Hot 100	96
US Digital Song Sales (Billboard)	62
US Hot R&B/Hip-Hop Songs (Billboard)	17
US Hot Rap Songs (Billboard)	9
US Pop Airplay (Billboard)	102
