= You Know Me (2 Pistols song) =

Single by 2 Pistols featuring Ray J

from the album Death Before Dishonor
- Released: May 27, 2008
- Recorded: 2008
- Genre: Hip hop
- Length: 3:37
- Label: BMU/Universal Republic
- Songwriter(s): William Ray Norwood Jr., Carlyle Dean Anderson, Kevin Crowe, Erik Ortiz Jeremy Lemont Saunders
- Producer(s): J.U.S.T.I.C.E. League

2 Pistols singles chronology
"She Got It" (2008)	"You Know Me" (2008)	"Lights Low" (2009)

Ray J singles chronology
"Sexy Can I" (2007)	"You Know Me" (2008)	"Gifts" (2008)

"You Know Me" is the second single by 2 Pistols from his debut album Death Before Dishonor. The single features Ray J. Like the first single, "She Got It," this song is produced by J.U.S.T.I.C.E. League. It was released for digital download on May 27, 2008, three weeks before Death Before Dishonor.

== Music video ==
The video for the song premiered on BET's 106 & Park on June 17, 2008.

== Charts ==
Chart (2008)	Peak position
US Rhythmic (Billboard)	38

== Release history ==
Region	Date	Format(s)	Label	Ref.
United States	May 27, 2008	Digital download	Universal Republic Records	
