= Make a Toast =

2008 single by Dolla

Single by Dolla

from the album A Dolla and a Dream
- Released: November 21, 2008
- Recorded: 2008
- Length: 3:53
- Label: The Gang, Konvict, Jive, LaFace, Arista
- Songwriter: Dolla
- Producer: Julian Bunetta

Dolla singles chronology
"Who the Fuck Is That?" (2007)	"Make a Toast" (2008)

"Make a Toast" is the second and final single by American rapper Dolla's shelved debut album A Dolla and a Dream. The song was produced by Julian Bunetta and has an upbeat, triumphant feel to it. Bunetta has sung the background vocals on the chorus but was uncredited. This is also the last single Dolla released before his death on May 18, 2009.

It was officially released to radio and iTunes on November 4, 2008. However, the song had been leaked to the internet long before its official release. In the song, Lil Wayne uses the Auto-tune effect for the remix.

The song peaked at number 25 on the Billboard Bubbling Under R&B/Hip-Hop Singles chart.

== Music video ==
An official music video was released on November 20, 2008. Throughout the video, there are various people celebrating and doing activities such as dancing, drinking, gambling, and swimming. It also premiered on BET's 106 & Park on November 21, 2008.

== Charts ==
Chart (2008)	Peak position
U.S. Billboard Bubbling Under R&B/Hip-Hop Singles	25
