= F.A.M.E. (song) =

Single by Young Jeezy featuring T.I.

from the album TM:103 Hustlerz Ambition
- Released: October 11, 2011 (digital download)
- Recorded: 2011
- Genre: Hip hop
- Length: 4:07
- Label: Def Jam
- Songwriters: J. Jenkins; E. Ortiz; K. Crowe; K. Bartolomei; C. Harris; A. Beardmore; J. Grant; A. McGuinness; P. Siljamaek
- Producer: J.U.S.T.I.C.E. League

Young Jeezy singles chronology
"Ballin'" (2011)	"F.A.M.E." (2011)	"I Do" (2012)

T.I. singles chronology
"I'm Flexin'" (2011)	"F.A.M.E." (2011)	"Here Ye, Hear Ye" (2011)

Music video
- "F.A.M.E." on YouTube

"F.A.M.E." (abbreviation for Fake Ass Motherfuckers Envy) is a song by American rapper Young Jeezy, released on October 11, 2011, as the third single from his fourth studio album Thug Motivation 103: Hustlerz Ambition (2011). The song features fellow Atlanta-based rapper T.I. and was produced by production team J.U.S.T.I.C.E. League, who sampled "Air for Life" as performed by Above & Beyond with Andy Moor as well as "You and Love are the Same" as performed by The Grass Roots.

== Music video ==
On November 16, 2011, behind-the-scenes footage of the music video was released. The music video, directed by Lance Drake, was released on November 18, 2011.

== Charts ==
Chart (2011)	Peak position
US Bubbling Under Hot 100 Singles (Billboard)	19
US Billboard Hot R&B/Hip-Hop Songs	67

== Release history ==
Country	Date	Format	Label	Ref
United States	October 11, 2011	Digital download	Def Jam	
United States	October 25, 2011	Radio airplay	Def Jam	
