= She Got It =

2008 single by 2 Pistols featuring T-Pain and Tay Dizm

Single by 2 Pistols featuring T-Pain and Tay Dizm

from the album Death Before Dishonor
- Released: January 8, 2008
- Recorded: 2007
- Label: BMU/Universal Republic
- Songwriters: A. Crowe; Artavious Smith; Erik Ortiz; Jeremy Saunders; Kevin Crowe; Faheem Najm
- Producers: J.U.S.T.I.C.E. League

2 Pistols singles chronology
"She Got It" (2008)	"You Know Me" (2008)

T-Pain singles chronology
"The Boss" (2008)	"She Got It" (2008)	"I Can't Wait" (2008)

Tay Dizm singles chronology
"Who the Fuck Is That?" (2007)	"She Got It" (2008)	"Beam Me Up" (2008)

"She Got It" is the debut single by American rapper 2 Pistols from his debut album Death Before Dishonor. The song features T-Pain and Tay Dizm and was produced by J.U.S.T.I.C.E. League. There is also an original version produced by long-time friend Bolo da Producer. "She Got It" reached number 24 on the Billboard Hot 100, number 9 on Hot R&B/Hip-Hop Songs, and number 2 on the Hot Rap Tracks chart.

== Music video ==
The song's music video features an appearance by Jay Lyriq and Sophia Fresh, who makes a cameo during Tay Dizm's verse.

== Remix ==
The official remix, "She Got It (J.U.S.T.I.C.E. League Remix)", features T-Pain, Twista, and Lil' Kim. Lil Flip also recorded a freestyle version of the song called "We Got It" which can be heard on his MySpace profile.

== Charts ==
=== Weekly charts ===
Chart (2008)	Peak position
US Billboard Hot 100	24
US Hot R&B/Hip-Hop Songs (Billboard)	9
US Hot Rap Songs (Billboard)	2
US Mainstream Top 40 (Billboard)	28
US Rhythmic (Billboard)	7

=== Year-end charts ===
Chart (2008)	Position
US Billboard Hot 100	100
US Hot R&B/Hip-Hop Songs (Billboard)	49
US Rhythmic (Billboard)	27

== Release history ==
Region	Date	Format(s)	Label	Ref.
United States	January 8, 2008	Digital download; rhythmic radio	Universal Republic Records	
United States	April 29, 2008	Contemporary hit radio	Universal Republic Records	
