= Louie (song) =

Single by Blood Raw featuring Young Jeezy

from the album My Life: The True Testimony
- Released: March 18, 2008
- Recorded: 2008
- Genre: Hip hop
- Length: 3:31
- Label: Corporate Thugz/Def Jam
- Songwriters: Bruce Falson Jr., Tracey Sewell and Jay Jenkins
- Producer: Midnight Black

Young Jeezy singles chronology
"Love in This Club" (2008)	"Louie" (2008)	"Put On" (2008)

"Louie" is the first single from Blood Raw's debut album My Life: The True Testimony, and features labelmate Young Jeezy. The song peaked at number 69 on the Billboard Hot R&B/Hip-Hop Songs chart. In the single, he talks about the French brand, Louis Vuitton.

== Charts ==
Chart (2008)	Peak Position
U.S. Billboard Hot R&B/Hip-Hop Songs	69
