= TM103 Hustlerz Ambition =

TM:103 Hustlerz Ambition

Studio album by Young Jeezy
- Released: December 20, 2011
- Recorded: 2009–2011
- Genre: Hip-hop
- Length: 61:47
- Labels: 8732; CTE; Def Jam
- Producers: D. Rich; Drumma Boy; J.U.S.T.I.C.E. League; Lil' Lody; Lil' C; M16; Mike Dupree; Mike Will Made It; Midnight Black; Warren G

Young Jeezy chronology
The Recession (2008)	TM:103 Hustlerz Ambition (2011)	Seen It All: The Autobiography (2014)

Singles from TM 103: Hustlerz Ambition
- 1. "Lose My Mind" Released: March 30, 2010; 2. "Ballin'" Released: May 17, 2011; 3. "F.A.M.E." Released: October 11, 2011; 4. "I Do" Released: January 10, 2012; 5. "Leave You Alone" Released: February 21, 2012

TM:103 Hustlerz Ambition (sometimes referred to as Thug Motivation 103) is the sixth studio album by American rapper Young Jeezy. It was released on December 20, 2011, by CTE World and Def Jam Recordings.

The album had been delayed for nearly two years, missing several purported release dates which have all been denied by representatives from Def Jam Recordings. The album marks the third album in his Thug Motivation series, along with Let's Get It: Thug Motivation 101 (2005), and The Inspiration (2006).

== Background ==
After initially being announced in 2009, the album was delayed for nearly two years and missed several release dates attached to it, including June 2010, August 2010, December 2010, and July 26, 2011,—exactly six years to the release date of his debut studio album, Let's Get It: Thug Motivation 101. Def Jam Recordings representatives declared these rumors false, however, Young Jeezy announced through the social networking site Twitter that the album was definitely completed, although at the time a release date—genuine or not—was not attached to the album. The date given was, in fact, the day after Young Jeezy was due to perform the whole of his aforementioned debut album at New York City's Highline Ballroom, on the sixth anniversary of the release of the album. During the show on July 25, 2011, he announced that TM 103 would be released on September 20, 2011. However, Young Jeezy later revealed that the album's release date would be December 20, 2011.

== Guests ==
On November 7, 2011, Young Jeezy confirmed that Ne-Yo, Snoop Dogg, Plies, Eminem, Drake, Bun B, Jadakiss, Jill Scott, Fabolous, T.I., André 3000, Jay-Z, 2 Chainz and Wiz Khalifa would be featured on the album. Eminem, Drake, Bun B, Plies and Wiz Khalifa do not appear on the final track listing, however a leftover featuring Eminem leaked called "Talk To Me" and the original version of "I Do" was released as the remix and features Drake. Other guest features that are on the album include Lil Wayne, Trick Daddy, Freddie Gibbs, Mitchelle'l and Future.

== Singles ==
"Lose My Mind" featuring fellow American rapper Plies, was released as the album's first single on March 30, 2010. The song has peaked at number 35 on the US Billboard Hot 100. On April 25, 2010, the music video for the song was released. The song was nominated for Best Rap Performance By Duo or Group at the 53rd Grammy Awards.

"Ballin'" featuring fellow American rapper Lil Wayne, was released as the album's second single on May 17, 2011. The song peaked at number 57 on the Billboard Hot 100. The music video for "Ballin'" was directed by Colin Tilley and was released on July 10, 2011.

"F.A.M.E." featuring fellow American rapper T.I., was released as the album's third single on October 11, 2011, and peaked at number 67 on the US Hot R&B/Hip-Hop Songs. On November 18, 2011, the music video for the song was released. "I Do" which features André 3000 and Jay-Z, was released as the album's fourth single, it had peaked at number 61 on the Billboard Hot 100 and number four on the Hot R&B/Hip-Hop Songs.

The album's final single, "Leave You Alone" featuring American singer Ne-Yo, was released on February 21, 2012. It peaked at number 51 on the Billboard Hot 100 and number three on the Hot R&B/Hip-Hop Songs. On March 9, 2012, the music video for the song was released.

=== Other songs ===
Jeezy released two promotional singles, "All White Everything" featuring fellow American rapper Yo Gotti, was released on July 2, 2010, and "Jizzle" featuring fellow American rapper Lil Jon, was released on August 3, 2010. The songs peaked at number 82 and number 69 on the Hot R&B/Hip-Hop Songs, respectively. However, neither of the songs appeared on the final track listing. On August 2, 2010, the music video was released for "All White Everything". On December 15, 2011, the music video was released for "Nothing". On January 15, 2012, the music video was released for "Supafreak" featuring 2 Chainz. On February 1, 2012, the music video was released for "OJ" featuring Jadakiss and Fabolous. On May 15, 2012, the music video was released for "Way Too Gone" featuring Future.

== Critical reception ==
Professional ratings
Aggregate scores
Source	Rating
AnyDecentMusic?	6.1/10
Metacritic	70/100
Review scores
Source	Rating
AllMusic	3.5/5 stars
The A.V. Club	C
Consequence	D−
Los Angeles Times	3/4 stars
Pitchfork	6.7/10
PopMatters	8/10
Rolling Stone	3.5/5 stars
Slant Magazine	2.5/5 stars
Spin	7/10
USA Today	3/4 stars

TM:103 Hustlerz Ambition was met with generally positive reviews. At Metacritic, which assigns a normalized rating out of 100 to reviews from mainstream publications, the album received an average score of 70, based on 16 reviews. Aggregator AnyDecentMusic? gave it 6.1 out of 10, based on their assessment of the critical consensus.

David Jeffries of AllMusic said, "Here he's driven by the hunger to put things back where they were and live up to TM:103's official subtitle, Hustlerz Ambition, along with its unofficial one, Trap or Die Tryin'." Chris Coplan of Consequence said, "Despite its success, this album gives us some idea as to why Jeezy has caught on and also why he isn't any bigger than he is now. Maybe he'll finally learn his lesson in TM:104?" King Eljay of AllHipHop said, "It's painful to say, but this is nothing more than a good album. Unfortunately for most Jeezy fans, we needed a great one, and this isn't it. Don't get it twisted; this is still a solid album, but it falters to reach the standards he set for himself out of the gate." William E. Ketchum III of HipHopDX said that Jeezy "gives a worthy addition to the series and continues his reign as one of rap's best."

Jayson Greene of Pitchfork said, "Thug Motivation somehow feels both airless and over-inflated, the sound of an artist trying to revisit something gone." Jonah Weiner of Rolling Stone said, "Jeezy stays stubbornly true to form on TM:103, rapping with minimal embellishment about getting rich (and high), treating beautiful cars poorly and beautiful women worse." Steve "Flash" Juon of RapReviews said, "Thanks in large part to the beats and the guest appearances, and in small part to Jeezy's frank delivery and raspy voice, it leans more toward the former [enjoyable] than the latter [obnoxious], leading me to give this album a cautious thumbs up." Jon Caramanica of The New York Times gave it an average review and called it "a step forward for Young Jeezy, even if everyone around him is walking much faster." Wilson McBee of Prefix Magazine said it "certainly has its moments, but on the whole it's bogged down by too much middling material." Ralph Bristout of XXL said, "Despite the abundance of features (twelve), Snow's fourth studio album is indeed a win. It's not glutted with a blizzard of coke boasts like his previous projects in the TM series, and offers a little more variety than just street cuts. But rest assured, the album is filled with anthems that'll have you riding around your hood all day with your gun shit."

== Commercial performance ==
TM:103 Hustlerz Ambition debuted at number three on the US Billboard 200, selling 233,000 copies in the first-week. On July 2, 2020, the album was certified platinum by the Recording Industry Association of America (RIAA) for shipping over a million copies in the United States.

== Track listing ==
TM:103 Hustlerz Ambition track listing
No.	Title	Writer(s)	Producer(s)	Length
1.	"Waiting"	Jay Jenkins; Antoine Kearney	Lil' Lody	3:29
2.	"What I Do (Just Like That)"	Jenkins; Christopher Gholson	Drumma Boy	4:17
3.	"OJ" (featuring Fabolous and Jadakiss)	Jenkins; Kearney; John Jackson; Jason Phillips; Masaaki Hirao; Kazuo Koike; Kouji Ryuzaki	Lil' Lody	4:04
4.	"Nothing"	Jenkins; Kearney	Lil' Lody	4:03
5.	"Way Too Gone" (featuring Future)	Jenkins; Mike Williams; Marquel Middlebrooks; Nayvadius Wilburn	Mike Will Made It; Marz^{[a]}	4:48
6.	"SupaFreak" (featuring 2 Chainz)	Jenkins; Dwayne Richardson; Tauheed Epps; James A. Johnson; Alonzo Miller	D. Rich	4:26
7.	"All We Do"	Jenkins; Tracey Sewell	Midnight Black	5:04
8.	"Leave You Alone" (featuring Ne-Yo)	Jenkins; Shaffer Chimere Smith; Warren Griffin III	Warren G	5:29
9.	"Everythang"	Jenkins; Kearney	Lil' Lody	3:38
10.	"Trapped" (featuring Jill Scott)	Jenkins; Erik Ortiz; Kevin Crowe; Kenny Bartolomei; Jill Scott	J.U.S.T.I.C.E. League	3:58
11.	"F.A.M.E." (featuring T.I.)	Jenkins; Ortiz; Crowe; Bartolomei; Clifford Harris; Andrew Beardmore; Jonathan Grant; Anthony McGuiness; Paavo Siljamäki	J.U.S.T.I.C.E. League	4:08
12.	"I Do" (featuring Jay-Z and André 3000)	Jenkins; Joshua Banks; Shawn Carter; André Benjamin; Leonard C. Williams; Michael Bennett	M16	5:12
13.	"Higher Learning" (featuring Snoop Dogg, Devin the Dude and Mitchelle'l)	Jenkins; Cordale Quinn; Michael Dupree; Calvin Broadus; Devin C. Copeland	Mike Dupree; Lil' C^{[a]}	3:44
14.	"This One's for You" (featuring Trick Daddy)	Jenkins; Kearney; Maurice Young	Lil' Lody	5:26

Deluxe edition (bonus tracks)
No.	Title	Writer(s)	Producer(s)	Length
15.	".38" (featuring Freddie Gibbs)	Jenkins; Kearney; Fredrick Tipton	Lil' Lody	5:05
16.	"Ballin'" (featuring Lil Wayne)	Jenkins; Kearney; Demetrius Ellerbee; Dwayne Carter	Lil' Lody	4:44
17.	"Lose My Mind" (featuring Plies)	Jenkins; Algernod Washington; Gholson	Drumma Boy	4:02
18.	"Never Be the Same"	Jenkins; Kearney	Lil' Lody	4:01

Notes

- ^{^[a]} signifies a co-producer
- On the edited album version of "Way Too Gone", Future's verse was unknowingly omitted.

Sample credits

- "OJ" contains a sample from "Banka", performed by Meiko Kaji from Golden Star Twin Deluxe (1974).
- "SupaFreak" contains a sample from "Super Freak", performed by Rick James from Street Songs (1981).
- "Leave You Alone" contains a sample from "Garden of Peace", performed by Lonnie Liston Smith from Dreams of Tomorrow (1970).
- "F.A.M.E." contains samples from "Air for Life", performed by Above & Beyond with Andy Moor from Tri-State (2006); and "You and Love Are the Same", performed by The Grass Roots from Feelings (1968).
- "I Do" contains a sample from "Lets Talk It Over", performed by Lenny Williams from Spark of Love (1978).

== Charts ==
=== Weekly charts ===
Chart performance for TM:103 Hustlerz Ambition
Chart (2012)	Peak position
Canadian Albums (Billboard)	45
US Billboard 200	3
US Top R&B/Hip-Hop Albums (Billboard)	1

=== Year-end charts ===
2012 year-end chart performance for TM:103 Hustlerz Ambition
Chart (2012)	Position
US Billboard 200	31
US Top R&B/Hip-Hop Albums (Billboard)	4

2013 year-end chart performance for TM:103 Hustlerz Ambition
Chart (2013)	Position
US Top R&B/Hip-Hop Albums (Billboard)	96

== Certifications ==
Certifications for TM:103 Hustlerz Ambition
Region	Certification	Certified units/sales
United States (RIAA)	Platinum	1,000,000^{‡}
^{‡} Sales+streaming figures based on certification alone.
