= Givin' Me a Rush =

Single by Tyra B
- Released: October 16, 2007
- Genre: R&B
- Length: 3:50 (album version), 3:59 (video version)
- Label: Warner Bros.
- Songwriters: Tyra Bolling, Michael Jackson, Steve Porcaro
- Producers: Prettyboy & Bradd

Tyra B singles chronology
"Get No Ooh Wee" (2006)	"Givin' Me a Rush" (2007)	"Get It Poppin'" (2008)

"Givin' Me a Rush", also called "Give Me a Rush", is a song recorded by Tyra B. for her project Past Due, which was never released as an album. The song peaked at number 36 on Billboard magazine's Hot R&B/Hip-Hop Songs. It contains vocal interpolations of Michael Jackson's "Human Nature", and Paula Abdul's "Rush Rush".

The music video for the single premiered on December 5, 2007. As of November 2026, the music video on YouTube has over 7.9 Million views.

== Charts ==
Chart	Peak position
U.S. Billboard Hot 100	122
U.S. Billboard Hot R&B/Hip Hop Song	36
