= Leave You Alone =

Song by Young Jeezy

Single by Young Jeezy featuring Ne-Yo

from the album Thug Motivation 103: Hustlerz Ambition
- Released: February 21, 2012
- Recorded: 2011
- Studio: The G Spot in Irvine, California
- Genre: Pop rap; G-funk
- Length: 5:29
- Label: Corporate Thugz; Def Jam
- Songwriters: Jay Wayne Jenkins; Shaffer Chimere Smith, Jr.; Warren Griffin III
- Producer: Warren G

Young Jeezy singles chronology
"I Do" (2012)	"Leave You Alone" (2012)	"We in This Bitch" (2012)

Ne-Yo singles chronology
"Turn All the Lights On" (2012)	"Leave You Alone" (2012)	"Let's Go" (2012)

Music video
- "Leave You Alone" on YouTube

"Leave You Alone" is a song by American rapper Young Jeezy featuring American singer-songwriter Ne-Yo. Produced by Warren G, the song was released on February 21, 2012 as the fifth single from Young Jeezy's fourth studio album Thug Motivation 103: Hustlerz Ambition (2011).

== Remix ==
Rapper/producer Warren G remixed the song for his mixtape, "No One Could Do It Better".

== Chart performance ==
Leave You Alone first charted on the US Billboard Hot R&B/Hip-Hop Songs at number 66 on the week of February 27, 2012. The single eventually reached it peak at number three on the chart. On the week of March 31, 2012, the song debuted at number 95 on the US Billboard Hot 100 chart. The song eventually reached it peak at number 51. On October 6, 2020, the single was certified platinum by the Recording Industry Association of America (RIAA) for combined sales and streaming equivalent units of over a million units in the United States.

== Charts ==
=== Weekly charts ===
Chart (2012)	Peak position
US Billboard Hot 100	51
US Hot R&B/Hip-Hop Songs (Billboard)	3
US Hot Rap Songs (Billboard)	2
US Rhythmic Airplay (Billboard)	2

=== Year-end charts ===
Chart (2012)	Position
US Hot R&B/Hip-Hop Songs (Billboard)	21
US Hot Rap Songs (Billboard)	10
US Rhythmic (Billboard)	16

== Certifications ==
Region	Certification	Certified units/sales
New Zealand (RMNZ)	Gold	15,000^{‡}
United States (RIAA)	Platinum	1,000,000^{‡}
^{‡} Sales+streaming figures based on certification alone.
