= Lights Down Low (2 Pistols song) =

Single by 2 Pistols featuring C-Ride and Young Joe

from the album Arrogant
- Released: March 24, 2009
- Recorded: 2008
- Genre: Hip hop, R&B
- Length: 4:04
- Label: Blood Money Union, Cash Money, Universal Motown
- Songwriter: 2 Pistols
- Producer: Cool & Dre

2 Pistols singles chronology
"You Know Me" (2008)	"Lights Down Low" (2009)	"Private Dancer" (2011)

"Lights Down Low" is a song by American rapper 2 Pistols, released by Cash Money Records and Universal Motown Records in March 24, 2009 as a non-album single. It was intended as the lead single for his second album Arrogant, which was never released. It features singer Young Joe, as well as rapper C-Ride; the latter was a signee of Epidemic Records, a label founded by the song's producers, Cool & Dre.

"Lights Down Low" reached number 63 on Hot R&B/Hip-Hop Songs, and number 13 on the Hot Rap Tracks chart. It was also released on MTV, Music Choice and various other major broadcasting networks.

== Charts ==
Chart (2009)	Peak position
US Hot R&B/Hip-Hop Songs (Billboard)	93
US Hot Rap Songs (Billboard)	13
