= Who the Fuck Is That? =

Single by Dolla featuring T-Pain and Tay Dizm

from the album A Dolla and a Dream
- Released: December 18, 2007 (single/radio); February 26, 2008 (digital download)
- Recorded: 2007
- Genre: Southern hip-hop; crunk
- Length: 4:13
- Label: The Gang/Konvict/Jive/LaFace/Arista
- Songwriter(s): Dolla, Akon, T-Pain, Tay Dizm, Klepto
- Producer(s): DJ Montay; Akon

Dolla singles chronology
"Who the Fuck Is That?" (2007)	"I'm Fucked Up" (2008)

T-Pain singles chronology
"Low" (2007)	"Who the Fuck Is That?" (2007)	"Shawty Get Loose" (2008)

Tay Dizm singles chronology
"Who the Fuck Is That?" (2007)	"She Got It" (2008)

"Who the Fuck Is That?" also known in the edited version as "Who the Heck Is That?" is by rapper Dolla. It was the first single from Dolla's shelved debut album A Dolla and a Dream. The song features T-Pain and Tay Dizm. It reached number 65 on Billboard's Hot Digital Songs chart in March 2008. The official remix of the song features labelmates T-Pain, Akon and Klepto.

== Music video ==
The song's music video leaked in November 2007. It premiered on BET's 106 & Park on January 14, 2008.

== Charts ==
Weekly chart performance for "Who the Fuck Is That?"
Chart (2008)	Peak position
New Zealand (Recorded Music NZ)	13
US Billboard Hot 100	82
US Hot R&B/Hip-Hop Songs (Billboard)	42
US Hot Rap Songs (Billboard)	21
US Pop 100 (Billboard)	66

== Release history ==
Region	Date	Format(s)	Label	Ref.
United States	November 13, 2007	Rhythmic contemporary radio	Zomba	
United States	February 26, 2008	Digital download	Zomba	
