= Ballin' (Jeezy song) =

Single by Young Jeezy featuring Lil Wayne

from the album Thug Motivation 103: Hustlerz Ambition
- Released: May 17, 2011
- Recorded: 2011
- Genre: Trap
- Length: 4:43
- Label: Def Jam
- Songwriters: Jay Jenkins, Antoine Kearney, D. Ellerbee, Dwayne Carter
- Producer: Lil Lody

Young Jeezy singles chronology
"Lose My Mind" (2010)	"Ballin'" (2011)	"F.A.M.E." (2011)

Lil Wayne singles chronology
"9 Piece" (2011)	"Ballin'" (2011)	"I'm on One" (2011)

"Ballin'" is a song by American rapper Young Jeezy from the deluxe edition of his fourth studio album, Thug Motivation 103: Hustlerz Ambition. It features rapper Lil Wayne and peaked at number 57 on the Billboard Hot 100 and number 15 on the Hot R&B/Hip-Hop Songs chart.

== Music video ==
The music video for "Ballin'" was directed by Colin Tilley, and was released on July 10, 2011.

== Remixes ==
An unofficial remix of "Ballin'" features Houston rapper Trae tha Truth in May 2011.

== Charts ==
=== Weekly charts ===
Chart (2011)	Peak position
US Billboard Hot 100	57
US Hot R&B/Hip-Hop Songs (Billboard)	15
US Hot Rap Songs (Billboard)	13

=== Year-end charts ===
Chart (2011)	Position
US Hot R&B/Hip-Hop Songs (Billboard)	80

== Release history ==
Country	Date	Format
United States	May 17, 2011	Digital download
