= My Life: The True Testimony =

Studio album by Blood Raw
- Released: June 17, 2008
- Studio: Dirty South Studios (Atlanta, Georgia); Thug Mansion Studios (Atlanta, Georgia); PatchWerk Recording Studios (Atlanta, Georgia); 360 Studios
- Genre: Southern hip hop; gangsta rap
- Label: CTE; Def Jam
- Producer: Arnaz "The Nazty One" Smith; Cliff Brown; Drumma Boy; J.U.S.T.I.C.E. League; Mannie Fresh; Megaman; Midnight Black; P-No The Matrikks; Terry "T.A." Allen; The Runners; Tony Rey

Singles from My Life: The True Testimony
- 1. "Louie" Released: March 18, 2008

Professional ratings
Review scores
Source	Rating
RapReviews	7/10

My Life: The True Testimony is the debut solo studio album by American rapper Blood Raw. It was released on June 17, 2008, via Corporate Thugz Entertainment/Def Jam Recordings. Recording sessions took place at Dirty South Studios, Thug Mansion Studios and PatchWerk Recording Studios in Atlanta, and at 360 Studios in Tallahassee. Production was handled by Arnaz 'The Nazty One' Smith, Midnight Black, Cliff Brown, Drumma Boy, J.U.S.T.I.C.E. League, Mannie Fresh, Megaman, PnO, Terry "T.A." Allen, The Runners, Tony Rey, with Demetrius "Kinky B" Ellerbee and Young Jeezy serving as executive producers. It features guest appearances from Big Rube, Lyfe Jennings, Mannie Fresh, Torica, Trina, and fellow U.S.D.A. groupmates Slick Pulla and Young Jeezy. The album was preceded by its lead single "Louie".

The album debuted at number 29 on the US Billboard 200, selling 17,377 copies in its first week.

== Track listing ==
No.	Title	Writer(s)	Producer(s)	Length
1.	"I'm the Truth" (featuring Big Rube)	Bruce Falson	pNo The Matrikks	5:04
2.	"It Feels Good"	Falson; Christopher Gholson	Drumma Boy	4:17
3.	"Louie" (featuring Young Jeezy)	Falson; Jay Jenkins; Tracey Sewell	Midnight Black	3:26
4.	"Almost There" (featuring Mannie Fresh)	Falson; Byron Thomas	Mannie Fresh	3:53
5.	"What's Happening" (featuring Trina)	Falson; Peter Arnaz Smith	Arnaz 'The Nazty One' Smith	4:12
6.	"Fuck You" (featuring Slick Pulla)	Falson; Renaldo Whitman; Antonio Rey; Clifford Brown	Tony Rey; Cliff Brown	4:04
7.	"Tryin' to Get Home" (featuring Lyfe Jennings)	Falson; Chester Jennings; Terry Allen	Terry "T.A." Allen	3:56
8.	"I'm Fly"	Falson; Smith	Arnaz 'The Nazty One' Smith	4:02
9.	"Get Away"	Falson; Erik Ortiz; Kevin Crowe	J.U.S.T.I.C.E. League	4:38
10.	"News Reporter" (performed by Torica)			0:07
11.	"Go Ahead"	Falson; Sewell	Midnight Black	3:45
12.	"Still a D Boy"	Falson	MegaMan	4:13
13.	"I Miss You"	Falson; Andrew Harr; Jermaine Jackson	The Runners	4:31

== Personnel ==
- Bruce "Blood Raw" Falson – main artist
- Ruben "Big Rube" Bailey – featured artist (track 1)
- Jay "Young Jeezy" Jenkins – featured artist (track 3), executive producer
- Byron "Mannie Fresh" Thomas – featured artist & producer (track 4)
- Katrina "Trina" Taylor – featured artist (track 5)
- Renaldo "Slick Pulla" Whitman – featured artist (track 6)
- Chester "Lyfe" Jennings – featured artist (track 7)
- Porsha – additional vocals (track 9)
- Torica Cornelius – voice (track 10)
- Delarmon "P-No" Harold – producer (track 1)
- Christopher "Drumma Boy" Gholson – producer (track 2)
- Tracey "Midnight Black" Sewell – producer (tracks: 3, 11)
- Peter Arnaz 'The Nazty One' Smith – producer (tracks: 5, 8)
- Cliff Brown – producer (track 6)
- Tony Rey – producer (track 6), recording (tracks: 1, 3–8, 11–13), mixing (tracks: 1–9, 11–12)
- Terry "T.A." Allen – producer (track 7)
- Erik "Rook" Ortiz – producer (track 9)
- Kevin "Colione" Crowe – producer (track 9)
- Orville "Mega Man" McWhinney – producer (track 12)
- Andrew "Dru Brett" Harr – producer (track 13)
- Jermaine "Mayne Zayne" Jackson – producer (track 13)
- Larry Pardillo – recording (tracks: 2, 13), mixing (track 13)
- G-Fat – recording (track 9)
- Chris Athens – mastering
- Demetrius "Kinky B" Ellerbee – executive producer, A&R
- Scott Danskin – art direction, design
- Tavon Sampson – art direction, design
- Clay Patrick McBride – photography
- Kristen Yiengst – art & photography coordinator
- Erica Bowen – A&R
- Lindsay Rodman – A&R
- Leesa D. Brunson – A&R
- Shakir Stewart – A&R

== Chart history ==
Chart (2008)	Peak position
US Billboard 200	29
