= Crime Mob (album) =

Studio album by Crime Mob
- Released: August 10, 2004
- Recorded: 2003–2004
- Studio: PatchWerk Recording Studios (Atlanta)
- Genres: Crunk; gangsta rap; hardcore hip-hop
- Length: 47:15
- Labels: BME; Crunk; Reprise; Warner Bros.

Crime Mob chronology
Crime Mob (2004)	Hated on Mostly (2007)

Singles from Crime Mob
- 1. "Knuck If You Buck" Released: June 29, 2004

Crime Mob is the self-titled debut album by Atlanta rap group Crime Mob. It produced three singles, "Knuck If You Buck", "Stilettos (Pumps)", and "I'll Beat Yo Azz", with music videos shot for all of them. "Knuck If You Buck" was certified Platinum by the RIAA in June 2006. The album peaked at #90 on the Billboard 200.

== Critical reception ==
Professional ratings
Review scores
Source	Rating
AllMusic	3/5 stars
Robert Christgau	(dud)
RapReviews	3.5/10

David Jeffries of AllMusic rated the album three out of five stars: "Crime Mob wouldn't know a new idea if it flew into their cough syrup, but they're as on point as crunk comes." Steve Juon of RapReviews rated it 3.5 points out of 10, panning the lyrical style as: "Say something really violent, rhyme it with something else, repeat ad nauseum." [sic] Robert Christgau rated the album as a "dud", whose symbol indicates "a bad record whose details rarely merit further thought."

== Track listing ==
No.	Title	Writer(s)	Producer(s)	Length
1.	"Crunk Inc."	Jonathan Lewis; Venetia Lewis; Alphonce Smith	Lil Jay	3:29
2.	"Knuck If You Buck" (featuring Lil Scrappy)	Jarques Usher; Chris Henderson; J. Lewis; V. Lewis; Brittany Carpentero	Lil Jay	3:25
3.	"If You Got Ana"	Usher; J. Lewis; Smith	Lil Jay	3:43
4.	"I'll Beat Yo Azz"	Usher; Henderson; J. Lewis; V. Lewis; Smith	Lil Jay	3:25
5.	"Fuck Niggas"	Usher; Henderson; J. Lewis; V. Lewis; Carpentero	Jock Mygraine	3:46
6.	"Stilettos (Pumps)" (featuring Miss Aisha)	Aisha Wright; V. Lewis; Carpentero	Lil Jay	3:20
7.	"Ain't No Joke"	Joe Bing; Usher; Henderson; J. Lewis; V. Lewis; Smith	Joe Bingo	4:01
8.	"If You Gonna Try Me"	Usher; J. Lewis; V. Lewis; Smith	Lil Jay	4:30
9.	"Ellenwood Area"	Usher; Henderson; J. Lewis; V. Lewis; Smith	Lil Jay	4:27
10.	"Put Yo Hands Up"	Usher; V. Lewis; Carpentero; Smith; J. Lewis; Henderson	DJ Jelly; DJ Montay	4:50
11.	"Diggin Me"	Usher; Henderson; J. Lewis; V. Lewis; Carpentero	Lil Jay	4:23
12.	"Black Market" (Bonus)	Joe Bing; Usher; Henderson; J. Lewis; V. Lewis; Carpentero	Joe Bingo	3:50
