= Lose My Mind (Jeezy song) =

Single by Jeezy featuring Plies

from the album Thug Motivation 103: Hustlerz Ambition
- Released: March 30, 2010
- Genre: Hip-hop
- Length: 4:02
- Label: Corporate Thugz; Def Jam
- Songwriters: Jay Jenkins; Algernod Washington; Christopher Gholson
- Producer: Drumma Boy

Jeezy singles chronology
"(Ha Ha) Slow Down" (2010)	"Lose My Mind" (2010)	"Ballin'" (2011)

Plies singles chronology
"She Got It Made" (2010)	"Lose My Mind" (2010)	"Phone #" (2010)

"Lose My Mind" is the first single released from Jeezy's album, Thug Motivation 103: Hustlerz Ambition. The song features rapper Plies. It was nominated for Best Rap Performance by a Duo or Group at the 2011 Grammys. It serves as a bonus track on the deluxe edition of the album. The song was also included on Jeezy's mixtape Trap or Die II.

== Music video ==
The music video for the song was released on April 25, 2010.

== Covers and remixes ==
The official remix features Drake and was performed at the 2010 BET Awards. This version features a verse by Drake replacing Plies verse. The second remix features Trae. Rapper B.G. and R&B singer Teairra Marí have freestyled over the instrumental of this song. R&B singer Ciara covered the single for her Basic Instinct mixtape.

== Charts ==
Chart (2010)	Peak position
US Billboard Hot 100	35
US Hot R&B/Hip-Hop Songs (Billboard)	5
US Hot Rap Songs (Billboard)	3
US Rhythmic Airplay (Billboard)	24

== Certifications ==
Region	Certification	Certified units/sales
United States (RIAA)	Platinum	1,000,000^{‡}
^{‡} Sales+streaming figures based on certification alone.
