= Tyra Bolling =

American singer (born 1985)

Tyra B
- Born: Tyra Shardell Bolling; June 27, 1985 (age 41); Petersburg, Virginia, U.S.
- Occupations: Singer; songwriter; dancer
- Years active: 2004–present
- Musical career
- Genres: R&B
- Instrument: Vocals
- Labels: GG&L; Warner Bros.; Sphinx; Walnut Hill; EMPIRE
- Website: Official Website

Tyra Shardell Bolling (born June 27, 1985), known professionally as Tyra B, is an American singer, songwriter, and dancer. She is best known for her top 40 R&B singles "Country Boy", "Still in Love" and "Givin' Me a Rush" which is her biggest single to date.

== Career ==
Bolling grew up singing with a local group by the name of Kraz'e with her sister and friend. While the other two singers went to college, Bolling decided to pursue a career as a singer.

In 2005, her singles "Country Boy" and "Still in Love" became Top 40 hits on the Billboard Hot R&B/Hip Hop chart without any support by major record companies. She worked with Chingy on the remix of "Country Boy", produced by PrettyBoy and Bradd Young. Another single "Get No Ooh Wee" was released also that year. Her debut album Introducing Tyra B was scheduled for 2006, but was never released.

In 2007, she began work on her second studio album Past Due which was preceded by the single "Givin' Me a Rush" which became her biggest hit to date. It peaked at #2 on BET's 106 & Park in addition to #36 on Billboard's Hot R&B/Hip Hop Singles and #22 on the Bubbling Under Singles chart. A follow-up single "Get It Poppin'" featuring Soulja Boy was released in January 2008. The album Past Due was pushed back several times and was set to feature appearances by Ludacris, Trey Songz and Soulja Boy before being shelved. She collaborated with 2 Pistols on the track "Candy Coated Diamonds" which was released in 2008.

In April 2013, Bolling released her The Morning After mixtape on her official site. which featured the single "Sex" which was released in 2012.

Currently, she is at work on her debut EP, Tysexual which was set to be released independently in 2016. The album's first single "Tease" premiered on March 31, 2015.

== Personal life ==
Bolling has publicly stated her song "Still in Love" was about an ex-girlfriend in high school.

== Discography ==
=== Albums ===
- Introducing Tyra B (2006) (Shelved)
- Past Due (2008) (Shelved)
- Tysexual (2016)

=== Mixtapes ===
- The Morning After (2013)

=== Singles ===
Year	Title	Chart positions			Album
Year	Title	U.S.	U.S. R&B	Note	Album
2005	"Country Boy"	—	35	Produced by Danja Mowf	Introducing Tyra
2005	"Still in Love"	—	62	Produced by PrettyBoy & Bradd Young	Introducing Tyra
2006	"Get No Ooh Wee" (feat. Penelope Jones)	—	40	Produced by Flip Matrix and Duane Darock Ramos	Introducing Tyra
2007	"Givin' Me a Rush"	122	36	Produced by PrettyBoy & Bradd Young	Past Due
2008	"Get It Poppin'" (feat. Soulja Boy)	—	—	Produced by PrettyBoy & Bradd Young	Past Due
2012	"Sex"	—	—	Written by Tyra B & D. Bryant	The Morning After
2014	"It Ain't Christmas (Without You Here)"	—	—	Written by Tyra B	—N/a
2015	"Tease"	—	—		Tysexual
2016	"Hardly Ever"	—	—		Tysexual
2017	"I'm Yours"	—	—		Tysexual
2017	"Dream"	—	—		TBA
2021	"Middle of Nowhere"	—	—		TBA

== Tours ==
- Destiny Fulfilled... and Lovin' It
