= Thug Motivation 102: The Inspiration =

The Inspiration: Thug Motivation 102

Studio album by Young Jeezy
- Released: December 12, 2006
- Recorded: 2005–2006
- Genre: Hip-hop
- Length: 77:14
- Labels: CTE; Def Jam
- Producers: Jeezy (also exec.); Demetrius "Kinky B" Ellerbee (exec.); Antonio "L.A." Reid (exec.); Kevin "Coach K" Lee (co-exec.); Shakir Stewart (co-exec.); J.U.S.T.I.C.E. League; DJ Toomp; Cool & Dre; Timbaland; Don Cannon; The Runners; Mr. Collipark; Juicy J; DJ Speedy; DJ Paul; Shawty Redd; Anthony Dent; Drumma Boy; Midnight Black; Key Pushas

Young Jeezy chronology
Let's Get It: Thug Motivation 101 (2005)	The Inspiration: Thug Motivation 102 (2006)	The Recession (2008)

Singles from The Inspiration: Thug Motivation 102
- 1. "I Luv It" Released: October 24, 2006; 2. "Go Getta" Released: December 11, 2006; 3. "Dreamin'" Released: February 28, 2007

The Inspiration (sometimes referred to as Thug Motivation 102) is the fourth studio album by American rapper Young Jeezy. It was released on December 12, 2006, by Corporate Thugz Entertainment (CTE) and Def Jam Recordings. Production was handled by Shawty Redd, Timbaland, J.U.S.T.I.C.E. League, The Runners, Cool & Dre, Mr. Collipark, Drumma Boy, Don Cannon and Midnight Black, among others. It features guest appearances from R. Kelly, Timbaland, Keyshia Cole, Blood Raw, Slick Pulla, T.I., Project Pat and Three 6 Mafia. The Inspiration was supported by three singles: "I Luv It", "Go Getta" featuring R. Kelly, and "Dreamin'" featuring Keyshia Cole.

== Singles ==
The album's lead single, "I Luv It", was released on October 24, 2006. The song was produced by DJ Toomp.

The album's second single, "Go Getta", was released on December 11, 2006. The song features a guest appearance from American R&B singer R. Kelly, while the production was handled by the duo The Runners.

The album's third single, "Dreamin'", was released on February 28, 2007. The song features a guest appearance from American R&B singer Keyshia Cole, while the production was also handled by The Runners.

== Critical reception ==
Professional ratings
Aggregate scores
Source	Rating
Metacritic	(70/100)
Review scores
Source	Rating
AllMusic	4/5 stars
Entertainment Weekly	B+
HipHopDX	3/5 stars
Los Angeles Times	3.5/4 stars
Pitchfork	8.1/10
PopMatters	6/10
RapReviews	7/10
Rolling Stone	3.5/5 stars
USA Today	3/4 stars
XXL	3/5 stars

The album has a score of 70 out of 100 on Metacritic, based on "generally favorable reviews". Vibe gave the album four stars out of five and stated that, "Despite its frustratingly uniform theme--coke--and Jeezy's inflexible, one-speed rasp, his sophomore effort, The Inspiration, suggests that last year's victories were no fluke." The A.V. Club gave it a B and stated that Young Jeezy "spits snowman raps with rough-hewn charisma and unseemly enthusiasm." The Chicago Tribune gave it three stars out of four and said that Jeezy "continues to improve, crafting songs that are distinctive and memorable, even if he sticks to the well-worn topics of rims, clothes and clubbing." Blender gave it three-and-a-half stars and said that "the smallest suggestions of personality make a charismatic impact." Spin gave the album seven out of ten and stated that "This time around, it's as if the script has been reshot by Michael Bay--glossy and viscerally stimulating--and we're watching a coming attraction for a film that never starts." Billboard gave it a positive review and said that Jeezy's lyrics "have matured past coke-slinging to the drug's effect on his life." The Phoenix gave it two-and-a-half stars out of four and said that "Fortunately, getting the money isn't all this follow-up to last year's breakthrough Let's Get It cares about, and the singles here are fire."

Other reviews are average or mixed: Okayplayer gave it an average review and stated, "The Inspiration, an even darker work than the debut, finds the Snowman weaving paranoid street tales with eerie trunk-rattling beats. The album's main downside is the repetitive nature of many of the tracks." Prefix Magazine gave it a score of six out of ten and called it "Spottily effective gangster posturing." However, Stylus Magazine gave it a C− and said, "The strange thing about The Inspiration is how it's posited as an alternative to the much-bullied "conscious rap", and yet, it's among the least fun albums released this year." The New York Times gave it a mixed review and said, "Young Jeezy's appeal was never his writing, but now words sometimes fail him." Hartford Courant also gave it a mixed review and said that "Almost every dramatic synth swell, exploding snare and multi-tracked "Yeaaahhhh" has been done better elsewhere."

== Commercial performance ==
Thug Motivation 102: The Inspiration debuted at number one on the US Billboard 200, selling 352,000 copies in the first week. This marked Jeezy's first US number-one debut and his second US top-ten album. In its second week, the album dropped to number 18 on the chart. In its third week, the album returned to the top-ten at number five on the chart, selling an additional 92,000 copies. In its fourth week, the album dropped to number seven on the chart, selling 45,000 more copies. On January 23, 2007, the album was certified platinum by the Recording Industry Association of America (RIAA) for sales of over one million copies. As of October 2009, the album has sold 1,229,000 copies in the United States.

== Track listing ==
No.	Title	Writer(s)	Producer(s)	Length
1.	"Hypnotize (Intro)"	Jay Jenkins; Demetrius Stewart	Shawty Redd	3:41
2.	"Still on It"	Jenkins; Tracey Sewell	Midnight Black	3:46
3.	"U Know What It Is"	Jenkins; Stewart	Shawty Redd	3:44
4.	"J.E.E.Z.Y."	Jenkins; Stewart	Shawty Redd	3:49
5.	"I Luv It"	Jenkins; Aldrin Davis	DJ Toomp	4:00
6.	"Go Getta" (featuring R. Kelly)	Jenkins; Andrew Harr; Jermaine Jackson; Robert Kelly	The Runners	3:49
7.	"3 A.M." (featuring Timbaland)	Jenkins; Timothy Mosley	Timbaland	3:56
8.	"The Realest"	Jenkins; Christopher Gholson	Drumma Boy	4:09
9.	"Streets on Lock"	Jenkins; Andre Lyon; Marcello Valenzano	Cool & Dre	3:34
10.	"Bury Me a G"	Jenkins; Erik Ortiz; Kenny Bartolomei; Kevin Crowe	J.U.S.T.I.C.E. League	4:43
11.	"Dreamin'" (featuring Keyshia Cole)	Jenkins; Harr; Jackson; Keyshia Cole	The Runners	4:49
12.	"What You Talkin' Bout"	Jenkins; Michael Crooms	Mr. Collipark	3:48
13.	"Keep It Gangsta" (featuring Slick Pulla and Blood Raw)	Jenkins; Renaldo Whitman; Bruce Falson	Key Pushas	4:36
14.	"Mr. 17.5"	Jenkins; Donald Clark	Don Cannon	3:30
15.	"I Got Money" (featuring T.I.)	Jenkins; Davis; Clifford Harris, Jr.	DJ Toomp	3:59
16.	"The Inspiration (Follow Me)"	Jenkins; Anthony Dent	Dent	4:25

Deluxe edition (bonus tracks)
No.	Title	Writer(s)	Producer(s)	Length
17.	"I Do This"	Jenkins; Harvey Miller	DJ Speedy	4:13
18.	"Hood Rat" (featuring Three 6 Mafia and Project Pat)	Jenkins; Paul Beauregard; Jordan Houston; Patrick Houston	DJ Paul; Juicy J	4:27

iTunes bonus track
No.	Title	Writer(s)	Producer(s)	Length
19.	"National Anthem"	Jenkins; Scott Jung	CHOPS	4:04

Sample credits

- "I Luv It" contains a sample of "I Believe to My Soul" performed by Donny Hathaway.
- "Go Getta" contains a sample of "Born on Halloween" performed by Blue Magic, and samples "Gone Away" performed by Roberta Flack.
- "Streets on Lock" contains an interpolation of "Out of Touch" performed by Hall & Oates.
- "Bury Me a G" contains a sample of "Child of God" performed by Millie Jackson.
- "Dreamin'" contains a sample of "Dreaming" performed by Bill Summers.
- "What You Talkin' Bout" contains a sample of "Close the Door" performed by Teddy Pendergrass.
- "Mr. 17.5" contains a sample of "Give Me Just Another Day" performed by The Miracles.
- "I Got Money" contains a sample of "Phantom of the Opera" performed by Andrew Lloyd Webber.
- "The Inspiration (Follow Me)" contains a sample of "Muscles" performed by Diana Ross.

== Charts ==
=== Weekly charts ===
Chart (2006)	Peak position
US Billboard 200	1
US Top R&B/Hip-Hop Albums (Billboard)	1

=== Year-end charts ===
Chart (2007)	Position
US Billboard 200	35
US Top R&B/Hip-Hop Albums (Billboard)	5

== Certifications ==
Region	Certification	Certified units/sales
United States (RIAA)	Platinum	1,000,000^{^}
^{^} Shipments figures based on certification alone.
