= Rock Yo Hips =

Single by Crime Mob featuring Lil Scrappy

from the album Hated on Mostly
- Released: August 29, 2006
- Recorded: 2006
- Studio: PatchWerk Recording Studios (Atlanta, GA)
- Genre: Crunk
- Length: 3:48
- Label: Crunk Incorporated Reprise, Warner Bros.
- Songwriters: Jonathan Lewis; Brittany Carpentero; Venetia Lewis; Jarques Usher; Chris Henderson; Alphonce Smith
- Producer: Lil' Jay

Crime Mob singles chronology
"Knuck If You Buck" (2004)	"Rock Yo Hips" (2006)	"2nd Look" (2007)

Music video
- "Rock Yo Hips" on YouTube

"Rock Yo Hips" is a song by American Southern hip hop sextet Crime Mob featuring Lil Scrappy. It was recorded at PatchWerk Recording Studios in Atlanta and released on August 29, 2006 via BME Recordings/Reprise Records as the lead single from the group's second studio album Hated on Mostly. Production was handled by Crime Mob member Lil' Jay. The single peaked at number 30 on the US Billboard Hot 100.

The music video directed by Dr. Teeth premiered on BET.com on November 7, 2006. The style of the video is inspired by Historically black colleges and universities, such as Morehouse College and Spelman College, and featured African-American fraternities such as Phi Beta Sigma, Omega Psi Phi, Alpha Phi Alpha and Kappa Alpha Psi.

The official remix features fellow rappers Young Dro and Rasheeda and new verses from the group.

== Track listing ==
No.	Title	Writer(s)	Producer(s)	Length
1.	"Rock Yo Hips [Radio Edit]" (featuring Lil Scrappy)	Brittany Carpentero; Venetia Lewis; Jarques Usher; Alphonce Smith; Chris Henderson; Jonathan Lewis	Lil Jay on the Track	3:48
2.	"Rock Yo Hips [Main]" (featuring Lil Scrappy)	Carpentero; V. Lewis; Usher; Smith; Henderson; J. Lewis	Lil Jay on the Track	3:49
Total length:				7:36

Rock Yo Hips (Enhanced CD single)
No.	Title	Writer(s)	Producer(s)	Length
1.	"Rock Yo Hips (Album Version)" (featuring Lil Scrappy)	Brittany Carpentero; Venetia Lewis; Jarques Usher; Alphonce Smith; Chris Henderson; Jonathan Lewis	Lil Jay on the Track	3:48
2.	"Circles" (Album Version)	Carpentero; V. Lewis; Usher; Detral Treadwell; Anita Poree; Jerry Peters	Detral "Doc Jam" Treadwell	6:37
3.	"Rock Yo Hips (Video)" (featuring Lil Scrappy)		Lil Jay on the Track
Total length:				10:25

Rock Yo Hips (12" vinyl)
No.	Title	Writer(s)	Producer(s)	Length
1.	"Rock Yo Hips (Album Version)" (featuring Lil Scrappy)	Brittany Carpentero; Venetia Lewis; Jarques Usher; Alphonce Smith; Chris Henderson; Jonathan Lewis	Lil Jay on the Track
2.	"Rock Yo Hips (Radio Edit)" (featuring Lil Scrappy)	Carpentero; V. Lewis; Usher; Smith; Henderson; J. Lewis	Lil Jay on the Track
3.	"Rock Yo Hips" (Instrumental)	Carpentero; V. Lewis; Usher; Smith; Henderson; J. Lewis	Lil Jay on the Track

== Personnel ==
- Jonathan "Lil' Jay" Lewis – main artist, songwriter, producer, mixing
- Brittany "Diamond" Carpentero – main artist, songwriter
- Venetia "Princess" Lewis – main artist, songwriter
- Jarques "M.I.G." Usher – main artist, songwriter
- Chris "Killa C" Henderson – main artist, songwriter
- Alphonce "Cyco Black" Smith – main artist, songwriter
- Darryl "Lil Scrappy" Richardson – featured artist
- Mike Wilson – mixing, recording
- Jamie Newman – assistant mixing

== Charts ==
=== Weekly charts ===
Chart (2007)	Peak position
US Billboard Hot 100	30
US Pop Airplay (Billboard)	39
US Hot R&B/Hip-Hop Songs (Billboard)	8
US Hot Rap Songs (Billboard)	5
US Rhythmic Airplay (Billboard)	9
US Radio Songs (Billboard)	24

=== Year-end charts ===
Chart (2007)	Position
US Billboard Hot 100	95
US Hot R&B/Hip-Hop Songs (Billboard)	31

== Release history ==
Region	Date	Format(s)	Label	Ref.
United States	May 8, 2007	Contemporary hit radio	Reprise	
