= Hated on Mostly =

Studio album by Crime Mob
- Released: March 20, 2007
- Recorded: 2006–07
- Genres: Southern hip hop; crunk; snap
- Length: 52:07
- Labels: BME; G'$ Up; Crunk Inc.; Reprise; Warner Bros.
- Producers: Lil' Jay; DJ Montay; Doc Jam; M.I.G.; Cyco Black; Lil Jon

Crime Mob chronology
Crime Mob (2004)	Hated on Mostly (2007)

Singles from Hated on Mostly
- 1. "Rock Yo Hips" Released: August 29, 2006; 2. "2nd Look" Released: March 6, 2007; 3. "Circles" Released: March 13, 2007

Hated on Mostly is the second studio album by American Southern hip hop sextet Crime Mob from Atlanta. It was released March 20, 2007 via BME Recordings, G'$ Up Entertainment, Crunk Incorporated, Reprise Records and Warner Bros. Records. Production was handled by Detral "Doc Jam" Treadwell, DJ Montay, Lil Jon, and group members Lil' Jay, Cyco Blac and M.I.G., with Lil Scrappy serving as executive producer. It features guest appearances from Lil Scrappy, Pimp C, Bohagon and Mike Jones. The album debuted at number 31 on the U.S. Billboard 200. Its lead single, "Rock Yo Hips", reached number 30 on the Billboard Hot 100 chart.

== Critical reception ==
Professional ratings
Review scores
Source	Rating
AllMusic	3.5/5 stars
RapReviews	4.5/10

AllMusic's Jason Birchmeier wrote: "Beyond the potent productions, handful of standout songs, and pair of female rappers, Hated on Mostly frankly isn't all that interesting. It's a more mature and commercial album than the group's self-titled 2004 debut, certainly, but it still leaves plenty of room for growth." Steve 'Flash' Juon of RapReviews commended the album's production but was critical of the group's lyrical content, concluding that: "Mostly I don't want to hate on Crime Mob but the lack of depth to anything they have to say leaves me very little choice, so buyers beware and know what you're getting into before you end up mostly hating throwing your money down the drain."

== Track listing ==
No.	Title	Writer(s)	Producer(s)	Length
1.	"Represent"	Brittany Carpentero; Chris Henderson; Jarques Usher; Jonathan Lewis; Venetia Lewis	Jonathan "Lil' Jay" Lewis	4:06
2.	"Hated on Mostly"	Alphonce Smith; Carpentero; Henderson; Usher; J. Lewis; V. Lewis	Jonathan "Lil' Jay" Lewis	4:05
3.	"On the Rise"	A. Smith; Henderson; J. Lewis; Detral Treadwell; Basil Poledouris	Detral "Doc Jam" Treadwell	2:50
4.	"2nd Look"	A. Smith; Carpentero; Henderson; Usher; V. Lewis; Montay Humphrey	Montay "DJ Montay" Humphrey	3:46
5.	"Rock Yo Hips" (featuring Lil Scrappy)	A. Smith; Carpentero; Henderson; Usher; J. Lewis; V. Lewis	Jonathan "Lil' Jay" Lewis	3:47
6.	"Shine Cause I Grind" (featuring Mike Jones)	A. Smith; Carpentero; Henderson; Usher; J. Lewis; V. Lewis; Mike Jones; Treadwell	Detral "Doc Jam" Treadwell	4:31
7.	"Sign in the Air"	A. Smith; Carpentero; Henderson; Usher; J. Lewis; V. Lewis	Jonathan "Lil' Jay" Lewis	4:07
8.	"Go to War" (featuring Lil Scrappy and Pimp C)	A. Smith; Carpentero; Henderson; Usher; J. Lewis; V. Lewis; Darryl Richardson; Chad Butler	Alphonce "Cyco Blac" Smith	4:05
9.	"Circles"	Carpentero; Usher; V. Lewis; Treadwell; Anita Poree; Jerry Peters	Detral "Doc Jam" Treadwell	4:05
10.	"We Some Playaz"	A. Smith; Carpentero; J. Lewis; V. Lewis	Jonathan "Lil' Jay" Lewis	4:23
11.	"Big Boy Pimpin'"	A. Smith; Carpentero; Henderson; Usher; J. Lewis; V. Lewis	Jacques "MIG" Usher	4:18
12.	"All Madden"	A. Smith; Carpentero; Henderson; Usher; V. Lewis	Alphonce "Cyco Blac" Smith	3:27
13.	"Wuz Up" (featuring Bo Hagon)	Carpentero; V. Lewis; Cedric Leonard; Jonathan Smith	Jonathan "Lil Jon" Smith	4:47
Total length:				52:07

== Personnel ==
- Jonathan "Lil' Jay" Lewis – main artist, songwriter (tracks: 1–3, 5–8, 10–11), producer (tracks: 1, 2, 5, 7, 10), mixing (tracks: 1, 2, 5)
- Alphonce "Cyco Blac" Smith – main artist, songwriter (tracks: 2–8, 10–12), producer (tracks: 8, 12)
- Jacques "M.I.G." Usher – main artist, songwriter (tracks: 1–2, 4–9, 11–12), producer (track 11)
- Brittany "Diamond" Carpentero – main artist, songwriter (tracks: 1–2, 4–13)
- Venetia "Princess" Lewis – main artist, songwriter – main artist, songwriter (tracks: 1–2, 4–13)
- Chris "Killa C" Henderson – main artist, songwriter (tracks: 1–8, 11–12)
- Darryl "Lil Scrappy" Richardson – featured artist (tracks: 5, 8), songwriter (track 8),
- Chad "Pimp C" Butler – featured artist & songwriter (track 8)
- Cedric "Bohagon" Leonard – featured artist & songwriter (track 13)
- Mike Jones – additional vocals & songwriter (track 6)
- Detral "Doc Jam" Treadwell – producer & songwriter (tracks: 3, 6, 9)
- Montay "DJ Montay" Humphrey – producer & songwriter (track 4)
- Jonathan "Lil Jon" Smith – producer & mixing (track 13),
- Mike Wilson – mixing (tracks: 1, 2, 4, 5, 7), recording (tracks: 1–5, 7, 9, 11)
- Chris Carmouche – mixing (tracks: 3, 6, 8–12), recording (track 13)
- John Frye – mixing (track 13)
- Mike Guidotti – recording (tracks: 6, 12)
- Brandon "Tec Beatz" Sewell – recording (tracks: 8, 10)
- Jason Fleming – recording (track 8)
- Julien Pineda – recording (track 8)
- Jamie Newman – assistant mixing (tracks: 1, 2, 4, 5)
- Warren Bletcher – assistant mixing (tracks: 3, 6–12)
- Aaron Holton – assistant engineering (tracks: 6, 12)
- Danny Zook – sample clearance
- A. Wright Williams – creative & visual direction
- Clay Patrick McBridge – photography
- Liza Joseph – A&R

== Charts ==
Chart (2007)	Peak position
US Billboard 200	31
US Top R&B/Hip-Hop Albums (Billboard)	10
US Top Rap Albums (Billboard)	4
