= No Problem (Lil Scrappy song) =

2004 single by Lil Scrappy

Single by Lil Scrappy

from the album The King of Crunk & BME Recordings Present: Trillville & Lil Scrappy
- Released: January 17, 2004
- Recorded: 2003
- Genre: Crunk
- Length: 3:34
- Label: BME; Reprise; Warner
- Songwriters: Darryl Richardson; Jonathan Smith
- Producer: Lil Jon

Lil Scrappy singles chronology
"Neva Eva" (2003)	"No Problem" (2004)	"Knuck If You Buck" (2004)

"No Problem" is a song by American rapper Lil Scrappy. It is his second single and the fourth single overall from the album The King of Crunk & BME Recordings Present: Trillville & Lil Scrappy (2004). The song was produced by Lil Jon.

== Music Video ==
A music video was filmed for the song in Los Angeles, California and was inspired by the film Training Day. In the video, Lil Scrappy portrays a rookie police officer on his first day of patrol, while Lil Jon portrays his veteran detective partner. After receiving a call from Lil Jon early in the morning, Lil Scrappy joins him for a patrol through the streets of Los Angeles.

During their shift, the pair encounter Blue (played by Snoop Dogg, reprising his role from the movie), who appears as a wheelchair-bound drug dealer. After attempting to flee, Snoop Dogg is apprehended by Lil Scrappy, while Lil Jon confiscates a duffel bag containing cash and a flask. Later, Lil Jon pressures Lil Scrappy into drinking from the flask, causing him to become disoriented.

That night, Lil Jon and Lil Scrappy visit a house in East Los Angeles, where Lil Jon introduces Scrappy to three gang members before leaving him alone with them to play cards. Suspecting that he has been set up, Lil Scrappy attacks the men and escapes the house. He then confronts Lil Jon, accusing him of betraying him, before stealing his vehicle and driving away. As Lil Scrappy departs, the residents on the house's street turn against Lil Jon and pursue him. In addition to Lil Jon and Snoop Dogg, The Game, Big Fase 100, Los Angeles tattoo artist Michael "Trigz" Pebley, WC and Archbishop Don Magic Juan all make cameo appearances.

== Charts ==
Chart (2004)	Peak position
US Billboard Hot 100	29
US Hot R&B/Hip-Hop Songs (Billboard)	10
US Hot Rap Songs (Billboard)	8
US Rhythmic Airplay (Billboard)	29

=== Certifications ===
Region	Certification	Certified units/sales
United States (RIAA)	Gold	500,000^{^}
^{^} Shipments figures based on certification alone.

== Release history ==
Region	Date	Format(s)	Label(s)	Ref.
United States	May 17, 2004	Rhythmic contemporary · urban contemporary radio	BME, Reprise	
