= Knuck If You Buck =

Single by Crime Mob featuring Lil Scrappy

from the album Crime Mob
- B-side: "Stilettos (Pumps)"
- Released: June 29, 2004
- Studio: PatchWerk Recording Studios (Atlanta, GA)
- Genre: Crunk; hardcore hip-hop
- Length: 3:28
- Label: Crunk Incorporated; Reprise; Warner Bros.
- Songwriters: Jarques Usher; Chris Henderson; Jonathan Lewis; Venetia Lewis; Brittany Carpentero
- Producer: Lil' Jay

Crime Mob singles chronology
"Knuck If You Buck" (2004)	"Stilettos (Pumps)" (2005)

Lil Scrappy singles chronology
"No Problem" (2004)	"Knuck If You Buck" (2004)	"What U Gon' Do" (2004)

Music video
- "Knuck If You Buck" on YouTube

"Knuck If You Buck" is the debut single by American Southern hip-hop group Crime Mob. It was recorded at PatchWerk Recording Studios in Atlanta and released on June 29, 2004, via Reprise Records as the first single from their eponymous debut studio album (2004). Written by members Jarques "M.I.G." Usher, Chris "Killa C" Henderson, Jonathan "Lil' Jay" Lewis, Venetia "Princess" Lewis and Brittany "Diamond" Carpentero, it was produced by Lil' Jay, and features fellow rapper Lil Scrappy.

The single peaked at number 76 on the US Billboard Hot 100 and was certified Platinum by the Recording Industry Association of America.

== Lyrics and composition ==
The song's lyrics have been described as a "celebration of elbow-throwing and fist-fighting". With the group given a $1,000 advance, an unmixed version of the song became a local hit in Atlanta.

== Music video ==
Directed by Bernard Gourley, the music video was released in August 2004. The official Warner Records upload on YouTube is dated October 26, 2009, but that's simply when it was uploaded to YouTube

== Critical reception ==
Mosi Reeves of Creative Loafing Atlanta described the song as "a raucous fire-starter" and "one of the hardest songs of the era". David Jeffries of AllMusic labeled it a "pumping party jam" and among the best tracks on the Crime Mob album.

== Impact ==
"Knuck If You Buck" has remained a nightclub staple. In 2006, during a late-night party at a Howard Johnson hotel ballroom near Fredericksburg, Virginia, a fight on the dance floor began after the DJ played the song, during which 16-year-old Baron "Deuce" Braswell II, who played on the football team at Courtland High School in nearby Spotsylvania, was stabbed to death. The suspect in the stabbing was convicted of second-degree murder and was sentenced to 30 years in prison in January 2007. Also in 2007, a fight broke out at an after-party hosted by the Harvard University Society of Black Scientists and Engineers. Police arrested two people who were not affiliated with Harvard for disorderly conduct.

In 2009, Pitchfork Media named "Knuck If You Buck" at no. 381 in its list of best songs of the 2000s. Complex ranked "Knuck If You Buck" no. 16 in its 50-deep list "The Best Atlanta Rap Songs" in 2015. Two years earlier, Complex ranked the song no. 7 in its list "25 Rap Songs That Make Us Want To Punch Someone In the Face".

In The Rap Year Book, Meaghan Garvey considered "Knuck If You Buck" to be the most important song of 2004: "...its super-essentialized beat and evergreen 'I wish a bitch would' threats never go out of season".

== Remixes, samples, and other uses ==
The official remix was released on Lil Scrappy's G's Up mixtape. It features verses by Daz Dillinger and Lil Scrappy and new verses by the group.

In 2015, the beat of this song was used for DLow's "Bet You Can't Do It Like Me" which reached No. 45 on the Billboard Hot 100.

The song received renewed attention throughout 2016. Before a rally for the Donald Trump presidential campaign at the University of Illinois at Chicago that eventually was cancelled on March 11, 2016, protesters were heard chanting "Fuck Donald Trump!" to the tune of the "Knuck If You Buck" chorus.

"The Club", a first-season episode of the TV series Atlanta, used the song as background music during a scene at a nightclub. The Wrap reported that viewers criticized the subdued nature of clubgoers depicted when the song played.

"Juju on that Beat (TZ Anthem)", a single by Zay Hilfigerrr & Zayion McCall that peaked at No. 5 on the Billboard Hot 100 in December 2016, sampled the beat of "Knuck If You Buck".

The single "Grandson for President", released on April 29, 2020, by rapper King Von, samples the beat to "Knuck If You Buck"

In 2024, the song was used in the trailer for the TV series Knuckles.

Cardi B makes a reference to the song in the chorus of her 2024 single "Enough (Miami)".

The song "I'll Take Care of You" by Tyler, The Creator released on July 21, 2025, sampled the verses from Killa C & Princess.

== Charts ==
=== Weekly charts ===
Chart (2004)	Peak position
US Billboard Hot 100	76
US Hot R&B/Hip-Hop Songs (Billboard)	25
US Hot Rap Songs (Billboard)	23

=== Year-end charts ===
Chart (2004)	Position
US Hot R&B/Hip-Hop Songs (Billboard)	94

== Certifications ==
Region	Certification	Certified units/sales
United States (RIAA) Mastertone	Platinum	1,000,000^{^}
^{^} Shipments figures based on certification alone.

== Release history ==
Region	Date	Format(s)	Label(s)	Ref.
United States	June 21, 2004	Urban contemporary radio	BME, Warner, Reprise	
