= I Luv It (Young Jeezy song) =

Single by Young Jeezy

from the album The Inspiration
- Released: November 2, 2006
- Recorded: 2006
- Genre: Gangsta rap; Southern hip hop; hardcore hip hop
- Length: 4:04
- Label: Def Jam
- Songwriters: Aldrin Davis, Jay Jenkins
- Producer: DJ Toomp

Young Jeezy singles chronology
"Grew Up a Screw Up" (2006)	"I Luv It" (2006)	"Top Back (Remix)" (2006)

Music video
- "I Luv It" on YouTube

"I Luv It" is the first single from Young Jeezy's second album The Inspiration.

== Music video ==
The music video for "I Luv It", directed by Jessy Terrero, premiered via MTV Jams on February 13, 2007.

== Charts ==
=== Weekly charts ===
Chart (2006)	Peak position
US Billboard Hot 100	14
US Hot R&B/Hip-Hop Songs (Billboard)	13
US Hot Rap Songs (Billboard)	7
US Pop 100 (Billboard)	59
US Rhythmic Airplay (Billboard)	17

=== Year-end charts ===
Chart (2007)	Position
US Hot R&B/Hip-Hop Songs (Billboard)	67

== Radio and release history ==
Country	Date	Format	Label
United States	November 28, 2006	Digital download	Def Jam Recordings, The Island Def Jam Music Group
United States	November 30, 2006	Rhythmic contemporary radio	Def Jam Recordings, The Island Def Jam Music Group
United States	November 30, 2006	Urban contemporary radio	Def Jam Recordings, The Island Def Jam Music Group
