= Diamond (rapper) =

American rapper

- Born: Brittany Nicole Carpentero; May 20, 1988 (age 38); Atlanta, Georgia, U.S.
- Genre: Hip hop
- Occupations: Rapper; singer; songwriter
- Instrument: Vocals
- Years active: 2004–present
- Labels: Warner Bros. (2004-2007); RCA (2011-2016); Polo Grounds (2010-2016); J (2010-2011); Universal Motown (2008-2010); Reprise (2004-2007); BME (2004-2007); Dime Piece Collection (2006-)
- Member of: Crime Mob
- Website: Official Instagram

Brittany Nicole Carpentero (born May 20, 1988), better known by her stage name Diamond, is an American rapper from Atlanta, Georgia.

== Early life ==
Brittany Nicole Carpentero was born May 20, 1988, in Atlanta, Georgia, to an African-American mother and a Puerto Rican father.

== Career ==
=== Crime Mob, 2004–2007 ===
At the age of fifteen, Diamond joined the group Crime Mob in 2004. Crime Mob first garnered national attention in 2004 with their single "Knuck If You Buck," which was eventually certified platinum. They released their debut album Crime Mob later that summer. Their next charting single, "Rock Yo Hips," was released in August 2006 and was followed by a second album, Hated on Mostly, in March 2007.

=== Solo career & various mixtapes, 2008–present ===
In November 2007, Diamond left Crime Mob to pursue a solo career and signed a management deal with Polo Grounds Music. In 2010, she appeared on the remix version of the Ludacris single "My Chick Bad", along with Trina and Eve. Her debut single "Lotta Money" was released in the summer of 2010; the video for the single included Gucci Mane. In 2011, Diamond released a song featuring Waka Flocka called "Hit That Hoe" a video was released in August 2011. Also in November 2011, Diamond released her single "Buy It All" on BET's 106 & Park. Diamond was nominated for Best Female Hip Hop Artist at the BET Awards of 2011. Diamond released her new single "Loose Screws" in 2012. She was nominated the second time for Best Female Hip-Hop Artist at the BET Awards 2012.

Diamond released her album The Young Life on August 28, 2012, with the singles "American Woman" featuring Verse Simmonds and "Love Like Mine" featuring Nikkiya. Diamond appeared as a cast-member for the Oxygen docu-series Sisterhood of Hip Hop. “I now have an all-girl group called Girl Code,” she says. “It’s a mixture of rock and rap. As I mature, my musical taste has grown as well — but I can never leave my fans behind and forget my musical roots.”

== Discography ==
=== Mixtapes ===
- 2007: Bitch Musik
- 2008: Bitch Musik Vol. 2: Ms. Boojhetto
- 2009: P.M.S. (Pardon My Swag)
- 2010: Bitch Musik: Part Three
- 2010: Cocaine Waitress
- 2011: Bitch Musik 4: Poor Little Rich Gurl
- 2012: The Young Life
- 2016: SHE (Shelved / Unreleased)
- 2017: P.M.S. (PARDON MY SLAYAGE)
- 2019: Vagina Power EP (feat. Princess)

=== As featured performer ===
List of singles as featured performer, with selected chart positions, showing year released and album name
Title	Year	Peak chart positions			Album
Title	Year	US	US R&B	US Rap	Album
"Sicknan"	2009	—	—	—	P.M.S. (Pardon My Swag)
"Lotta Money"	2010	—	—	—	Non-album single
"Buy It All"	2011	—	—	—	Bitch Musik 4: Poor Lil Rich Gurl
"Loose Screws"	2012	—	—	—	Bitch Musik 4: Poor Lil Rich Gurl
"Love Like Mine" (featuring Nikkiya)	2012	—	—	—	The Young Life
"American Woman" (featuring Verse Simmonds)	2012	—	—	—	The Young Life

=== Promotional singles ===
List of promotional singles, with selected chart positions, showing year released and album name
Title	Year	Peak chart positions	Album
Title	Year	US R&B	Album
"Superbad" (featuring Cee-Lo Green)	2009	—	Non-album singles
"Hit That Hoe" (featuring Waka Flocka Flame)	2011	—	Cocaine Waitress

==== As featured artist ====
Song	Year	Peak chart positions			Album
Song	Year	US	US R&B	US Rap	Album
"Shawty Wus Up" (Dondria featuring Johntá Austin and Diamond)	2010	—	66	—	Dondria vs. Phatfffat
"Fly Girl" (Dukwon featuring Diamond)	2012	—	—	—	
"Main Chick" (Dominique Reighard featuring Diamond)	2012	—	—	—	

== Guest appearances ==
List of non-single guest appearances, with other performing artists, showing year released and album name
Title	Year	Other artist(s)	Album
"Bitches Ain't Shit"	2009	Attitude	
"My Chick Bad" (Remix)	2010	Ludacris, Trina, Eve, Nicki Minaj	
"BedRock" (Remix)	2010	Rasheeda, Toya, Kandi Burruss, LoLa Monroe	
"Born To Win"	2010	Rocko	Wild Life
"Get Big" (Remix)	2010	Dorrough, Diddy, Yo Gotti, Shawty Lo, Maino, DJ Drama	—N/a
"Lick The Cat"	2010	Yelawolf	Trunk Muzik
"Flash The Cash"	2011	Driicky Graham	
"Bossed Up"	2011	Soulja Boy	—N/a
"Papercuts"	2011	Rocko	Rocko Dinero
"That Right"	2011	Soulja Boy	Juice
"Big & Fat" (Remix)	2012	Shawnna	—N/a
"Ice Cream"	2012	Freeway	Freedom Of Speech
"Diamond Lane"	2012	Millionaires	Your Girl Does Party
"Remix"	2013	Soulja Boy	Foreign 2
"Birthday Party"	2015	PricelessDaROC	

== Personal life ==
Diamond has a son from her previous relationship with Mr. Payro. On July 16, 2024, Diamond reveals that she is pregnant with her second child after getting engaged to pro athlete Deven Reese Paulsen. On December 6, 2024, she gave birth to another boy.
