= 2 Pistols =

American rapper (born 1983)

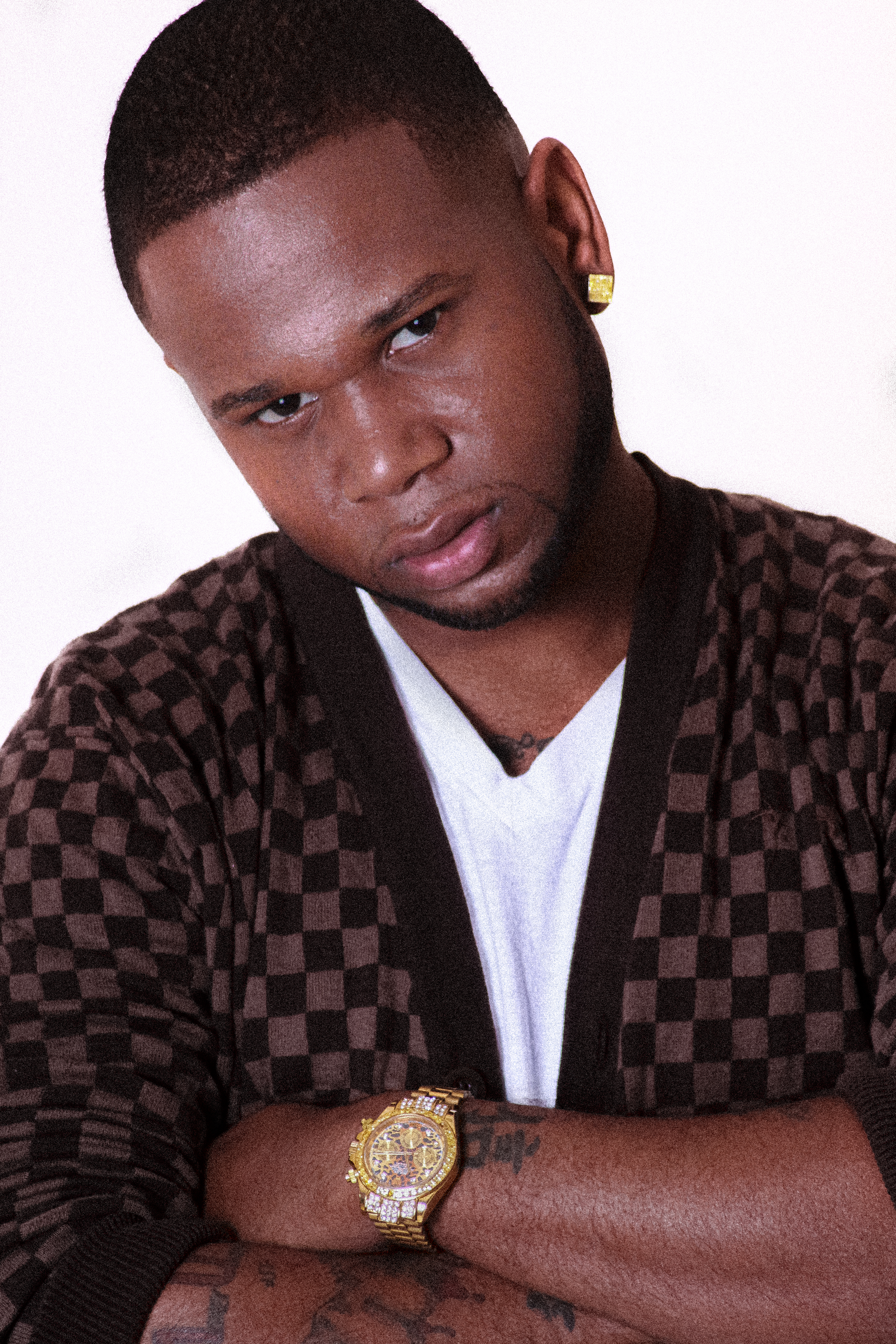
- Saunders in 2008

Background information
- Also known as: 2P
- Born: Jeremy Lemont Saunders; June 11, 1983 (age 43); Tarpon Springs, Florida, U.S.
- Genre: Hip hop
- Occupations: Rapper; songwriter
- Years active: 2006–present
- Labels: Stage One; Blood Money; SRC; Republic; Universal Republic; Universal Motown

Jeremy Lemont Saunders (born June 11, 1983), better known by his stage name 2 Pistols (censored as 2P), is an American rapper. After the local success of his independent single "Dirty Foot", he signed a record deal with Universal Republic Records in 2007. In January 2008, he released his debut single, "She Got It" (featuring T-Pain and Tay Dizm), which peaked at number 24 on the Billboard Hot 100. The song preceded his debut studio album, Death Before Dishonor (2008), which saw moderate critical and commercial reception and no further mainstream recognition with its follow–ups.

== Biography ==
Saunders grew up in a broken home, with his extended family looking after him. In his teens, Saunders became involved in local crime, and in 2005, he was incarcerated for eight months. After this, he became involved in music promotion and formed a group called Blood Money Union, which consisted of other DJs, producers, and rappers.

Saunders' first success in rapping came with a self-released record called "Dirty Foot", which he wrote while still in high school and distributed in the Tarpon Springs area at the urging of his cousin. After hearing it played in a local dance club and then witnessing another rapper's performance, 2 Pistols had his first chance to perform on stage. After taking the stage and performing his own single ("Dirty Foot"), 2 Pistols' confidence in his abilities grew to the point that he began to take his chances at making a career of music seriously.

On June 17, 2008, he released his debut album, Death Before Dishonor, which featured production from the Grammy-winning J.U.S.T.I.C.E. League, Da Honorable C.N.O.T.E., Bolo Da Producer, and others. Tracks from the album included "You Know Me" featuring Ray J and "Thats My Word" featuring Trey Songz, in addition to "She Got It". The album reached number 32 on the Billboard 200 chart and climbed to number 10 on the Billboard Top R&B/Hip-Hop Albums chart. 2 Pistols resides in Tampa, Florida, and currently releases his music under his own label, Blood Money Union. In February 2014, the album Comin Back Hard appeared through Stage One Music.

== Discography ==
=== Studio albums ===
List of albums
Title	Album details
Death Before Dishonor	Released: June 17, 2008; Label: Universal Republic; Format: CD, digital download
Comin Back Hard	Released: February 4, 2014; Label: Stage One Music; Format: CD, digital download

=== Mixtapes ===
- The Jimmy Jump Introduction (hosted by DJ Smallz) (2007)
- Live From the Kitchen (hosted by DJ Kid Hustle and DJ Hot Rod) (2009)
- 10-20-Life (with Bigga Rankin) (2010)
- Hollow Tip Music (with DJ Dammit) (2010)
- Back 4 The 1st Time (hosted by DJ Hitz and DJ Woogie) (2010)
- The Rapture (hosted by DJ Spiniatik) (2011)
- Mr. P (hosted by DJ Dammit) (2011)
- Arrogant (Street Album) (hosted by DJ Scream) (2012)

=== Singles ===
List of singles, with selected chart positions and certifications, showing year released and album name
Title	Year	Peak chart positions			Certifications	Album
Title	Year	US	US R&B	US Rap	Certifications	Album
"She Got It" (featuring T-Pain & Tay Dizm)	2008	24	9	2	US: Platinum	Death Before Dishonor
"You Know Me" (featuring Ray J)	2008	-	-	-		Death Before Dishonor
"Lights Low" (featuring C-Ride & Young Joe)	2009	-	93	13		—N/a
"Know That" (featuring French Montana)	2013	-	-	-		Comin Back Hard
"—" denotes items that did not chart or were not released.
