= Crime Mob =

American hip hop group

- Origin: Atlanta, Georgia, U.S.
- Genres: Hip hop; crunk; southern hip hop
- Occupation: Rappers
- Instrument: Vocals
- Years active: 2002–2008; 2016–present
- Labels: Crunk Incorporated; Warner Bros.; Reprise
- Members: M.I.G. Cyco Blac aka Money Blac; Lil' Jay; Princess; Diamond
- Past members: Killa C

Crime Mob is an American hip hop group hailing from Atlanta consisting of six members: M.I.G., Cyco Blac, Princess, Lil' Jay, Diamond, and Killa C. The group is best known for their songs "Knuck If You Buck" and "Rock Yo Hips". After an arrest in 2003, member Killa C left the group. Crime Mob reunited and performed at Atlanta's Hot 107.9's Birthday Bash in 2012; Princess was the only absent member. In 2018, all members of Crime Mob were reunited by Atlanta-based producer Mike Will Made It on a song called "We Can Hit" featuring Slim Jxmmi of Rae Sremmurd. The song is featured on the Creed II movie soundtrack.

== Discography ==
=== Albums ===
- Crime Mob
  - Released: August 10, 2004
  - U.S. Billboard 200: #90
  - Top R&B/Hip-Hop Albums: #11
  - U.S. Sales: 270,000+
  - RIAA Certification: N/A
- Hated on Mostly
  - Released: March 20, 2007
  - U.S. Billboard 200: #31
  - Top Rap Albums: #4
  - Top R&B/Hip-Hop Albums: #10
  - U.S. Sales: 67,000+
  - RIAA Certification: N/A

=== Singles ===
List of singles, with selected chart positions, showing year released and album name
Title	Year	Peak chart positions			Album
Title	Year	US	US R&B	US Rap	Album
"Knuck If You Buck" (featuring Lil Scrappy)	2004	75	28	23	Crime Mob
"Stilettos (Pumps)"	2005	—	125	—	Crime Mob
"I'll Beat Yo Azz"	2005	—	—	—	Crime Mob
"Rock Yo Hips" (featuring Lil Scrappy)	2006	30	8	5	Hated on Mostly
"Circles"	2007	—	119	—	Hated on Mostly
"We Can Hit (Round 1)" (with Mike Will Made-It featuring Slim Jxmmi)	2018	—	—	—	Creed II: The Album
"—" denotes a recording that did not chart.
