= Tay Dizm =

American rapper from Florida

- Born: Artavious Courtez Smith; May 3, 1980 (age 46)
- Origin: Miami, Florida, U.S.
- Genres: Hip hop; pop rap
- Occupations: Rapper; songwriter; hype man
- Years active: 2004–present
- Labels: Nappy Boy; Warner Bros.
- Website: www.taydizm.com

Artavious Courtez Smith (born May 3, 1980), known professionally as Tay Dizm, is an American rapper and hype man best known for being signed to T-Pain's Nappy Boy Entertainment record label.

== Biography ==
Smith spent his entire childhood raised in foster homes before finding his biological family in Miami, Florida. His two brothers taught him how to rap and recorded mixtapes with him. He moved to Tallahassee, Florida, where he met singer T-Pain, for whom Smith would become a hypeman. Under stage name Tay Dizm, Smith did guest performances on tracks from T-Pain's first three albums.

Dizm is the first artist to release an album under T-Pain's Nappy Boy Digital label. He has appeared on the singles "Who the Fuck is That?" by Dolla and "She Got It" by 2 Pistols, which charted on the Billboard Year-End Hot 100 singles of 2008. On August 19, 2008, Dizm released his debut single, "Beam Me Up," featuring T-Pain and Rick Ross, which was released online via Nappy Boy Digital. It quickly sold 4,000 downloads, according to Nielsen SoundScan, without significant promotion. He is featured in all three of T-Pain's solo albums.

The second single, "Dream Girl", features Akon and charted on the Billboard Bubbling Under Hot 100 chart in February 2009. It was featured on Dizm's album, Welcome to the New World. The album's third single, "Nothing But The Truth", original version featured Atlanta rapper Dolla and Desloc Piccalo from Miami. The album version features Desloc Piccalo and Young Cash. Single "Club Pack" was released on MTV on February 20, 2013.

== Discography ==
=== Albums ===
- TBA: Welcome to the New World

=== Extended plays ===
- TBA: The Temptations

=== Mixtapes ===
- 2007: Tha Hottest Hotboy
- 2009: Dreamgirl
- 2010: Point 'Em Out
- 2011: Thank You For Being A Friend
- 2012: ART

=== Singles ===
- 2007: "Like Me" (Feat. Lil Wayne)
- 2008: "Beam Me Up" (Feat. T-Pain & Rick Ross)
- 2009: "Dreamgirl" (Feat. Akon)
- 2009: "Nothing But the Truth" (Feat. Young Cash & Piccalo)
- 2012: "Getting to the Money" (Feat. T-Pain & J-Bo)
- 2013: "Club Pack" (Feat. Young Cash)
- 2014: "Pop It" (Feat. Young Cash)
- 2016: "Good Lil Bit" (Feat. T-Pain & Krayzie Bone)

== Guest appearances ==
List of non-single guest appearances, with other performing artists, showing year released and album name
Title	Year	Other artist(s)	Album
"Dance Floor"	2005	T-Pain	Rappa Ternt Sanga
"Yo Stomach"	2007	T-Pain	Epiphany
"Digital"	2008	T-Pain	Three Ringz
"Depressing"	2011	T-Pain	Prevolver
"Bring It Back"	2011	T-Pain	Prevolver
"Never Leave Her"	2011	T-Pain	Revolver
"The Champ"	2012	T-Pain	Stoic
"I'll Never Be"	2012	T-Pain, Travie McCoy	Stoic
"Exclusive"	2012	T-Pain, Young Cash	Stoic
"I'm Fucking Done"	2015	T-Pain	Stoicville: The Phoenix

=== Notes ===
- "Never Leave Her" is a promotional single to Revolver.
