= Blood Raw =

American rapper (born 1975)

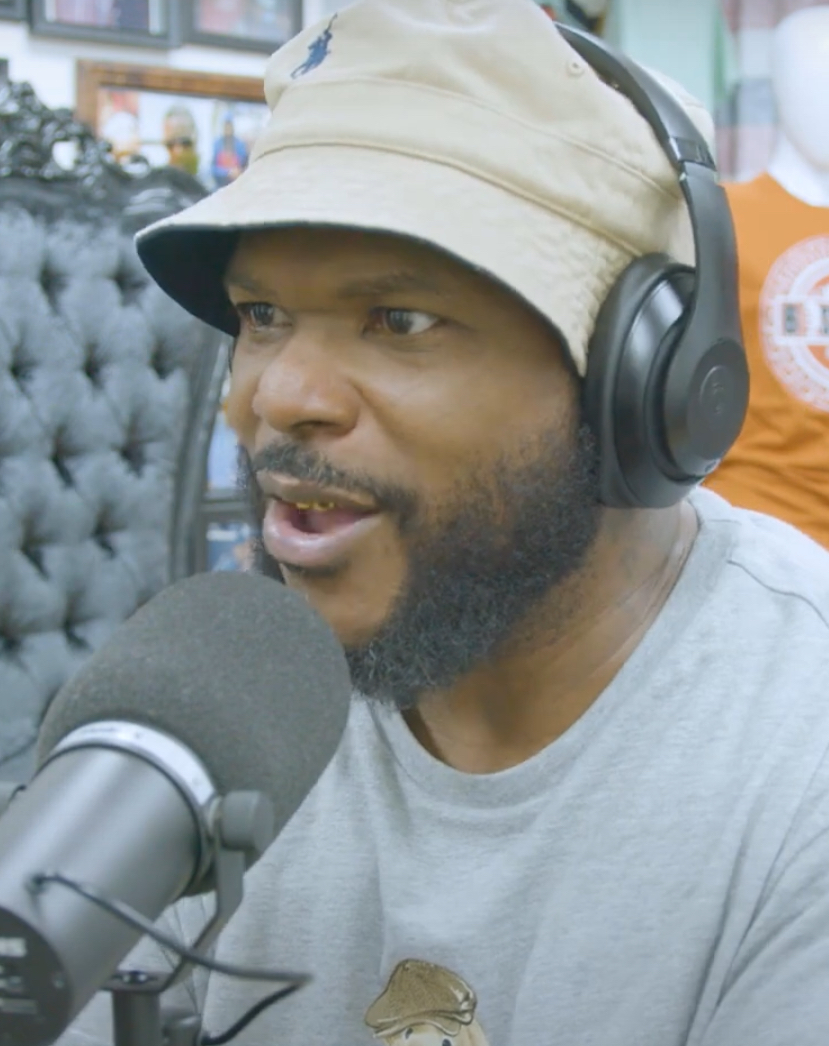
- Blood Raw in 2023

Background information
- Born: Bruce Stan Falson; April 17, 1975 (age 51); Panama City, Florida, U.S.
- Genres: Hip hop
- Occupation: Rapper
- Years active: 2000–present
- Labels: CTE; Def Jam

Bruce Stan Falson (born April 17, 1975), better known by his stage name Blood Raw, is an American rapper. He was part of the Atlanta-based rap-group U.S.D.A. until 2010.

His debut album, My Life: The True Testimony, peaked at number 5 on the Billboard Top R&B/Hip-Hop Albums chart and reached number 29 on the Billboard 200.

== Discography ==
Studio albums

- My Life: The True Testimony (2008)
- Raw Redemption (2012)

Collaborative albums

- Cold Summer (with U.S.D.A.) (2007)
