= Yo Gotti discography =

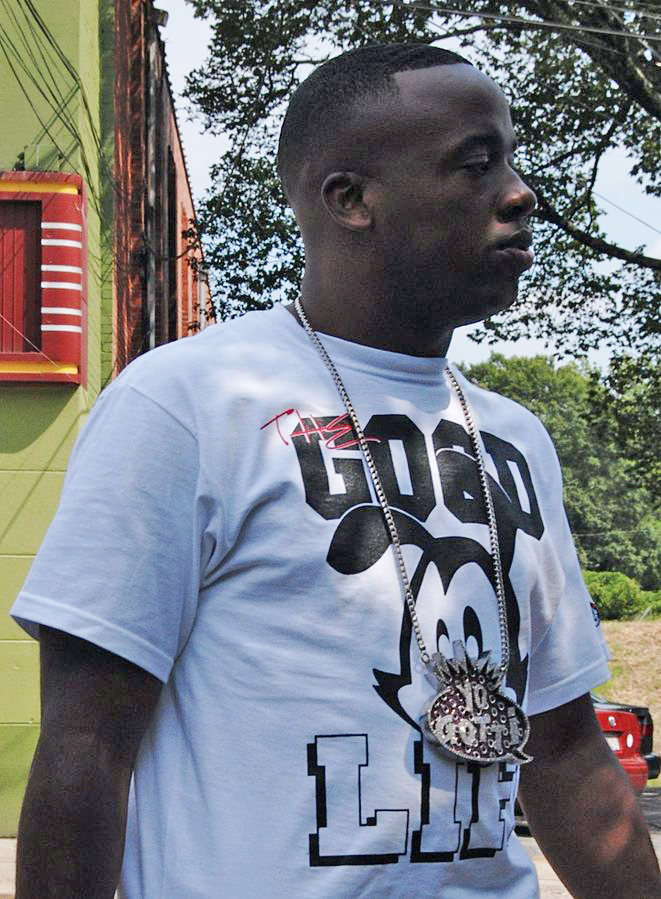
- Yo Gotti in 2009
- Studio albums: 11
- Compilation albums: 2
- Singles: 59
- Mixtapes: 25
- Featured artist: 24

American rapper Yo Gotti has released 11 studio albums, 25 mixtapes and 59 singles (plus 24 as featured artist), and 5 promotional singles. After several guest appearances, mixtapes and independent releases, he released his major-label debut album Life, in 2003.

== Albums ==
=== Studio albums ===
List of albums, with selected chart positions
Title	Album details	Peak chart positions				Certifications
Title	Album details	US	US R&B/HH	US Rap	CAN	Certifications
Youngsta's on a Come Up (as Lil Yo)	Released: 1996; Label: Crime Lordz, Gimi Sum; Format: Cassette	—	—	—	—	
From da Dope Game 2 da Rap Game	Released: October 17, 2000; Label: Inevitable; Format: CD, cassette, digital download	—	—	—	—	
Self-Explanatory	Released: May 22, 2001; Label: Inevitable; Format: CD, cassette, digital download	—	—	—	—	
Life	Released: May 13, 2003; Label: TVT; Format: CD, digital download	—	59	—	—	
Back 2 da Basics	Released: May 23, 2006; Label: TVT; Format: CD, LP, digital download	84	6	3	—	
Live from the Kitchen	Released: January 10, 2012; Label: Polo Grounds, J, RCA; Format: CD, digital download	12	4	4	—	
I Am	Released: November 19, 2013; Label: CMG, Epic; Format: CD, digital download	7	2	2	—	RIAA: Gold
The Art of Hustle	Released: February 19, 2016; Label: CMG, Epic; Format: CD, digital download	4	1	1	82	RIAA: Gold
I Still Am	Released: October 27, 2017; Label: CMG, Roc Nation, Epic; Format: CD, digital download	6	4	3	74	RIAA: Gold
Untrapped	Released: January 31, 2020; Label: CMG, Roc Nation, Epic; Format: digital download, streaming	10	6	6	—	RIAA: Gold
CM10: Free Game	Released: February 4, 2022; Label: CMG, Inevitable II; Format: CD, digital download, streaming	3	2	2	—	
"—" denotes a recording that did not chart or was not released in that territory.

=== Compilation albums ===
Title	Details	Peak chart positions		
Title	Details	US	US R&B /HH	US Rap
Gangsta Art (with CMG the Label)	Released: July 15, 2022; Label: CMG, Interscope; Format: Digital download, streaming	11	6	3
Gangsta Art 2 (with CMG the Label)	Released: September 29, 2023; Label: CMG, Interscope; Format: Digital download, streaming	78	31	25
"—" denotes a recording that did not chart.

=== Mixtapes ===
List of mixtapes, with selected chart positions
Title	Album details	Peak chart positions			
Title	Album details	US	US R&B/HH	US Rap	US Ind.
Gettin' Money Like A Mutha F**ka	Released: 2004; Label: Inevitable Entertainment, Cash Money Records; Format: CD, Compilation, Stereo	—	—	—	—
Full Time Hustlin'	Released: March 30, 2006; Label: BCD; Format: CD, digital download	—	—	—	—
I Told U So (with DJ Drama)	Released: November 28, 2006; Label: 101 Distribution; Format: CD, digital download	—	—	—	—
Cocaine Muzik	Released: February 19, 2008; Label: Inevitable; Format: CD, digital download	—	86	—	—
Definition of a G (with Gucci Mane)	Released: August 19, 2008; Label: So Icey; Format: CD, digital download	—	—	—	—
Cocaine Muzik 2	Released: April 7, 2009; Label: Inevitable, TVT; Format: CD, digital download	200	29	11	24
Cocaine Muzik 3	Released: September 24, 2009; Label: Inevitable; Format: CD, digital download	—	—	—	—
Cocaine Muzik 4 (with Zedzilla)	Released: January 19, 2010; Label: Inevitable; Format: CD, digital download	—	—	—	—
Cocaine Muzik 4.5: Da Documentary	Released: July 27, 2010; Label: Self-released; Format: Digital download	—	—	—	—
Cocaine Muzik 5: White Friday	Released: December 10, 2010; Label: Self-released; Format: Digital download	—	—	—	—
Cocaine Muzik 6: Gangster of the Year	Released: July 26, 2011; Label: Self-released; Format: Digital download	—	—	—	—
January 10th: The Mixtape	Released: December 30, 2011; Label: Self-released; Format: Digital download	—	—	—	—
Cocaine Muzik 7: The World Is Yours	Released: October 17, 2012; Label: Self-released; Format: Digital download	—	—	—	—
Nov 19th: The Mixtape	Released: September 2, 2013; Label: Self-released; Format: Digital download	—	—	—	—
Chapter One (with CMG)	Released: May 22, 2014; Label: Collective Music Group; Format: Digital download	—	—	—	—
Concealed	Released: January 19, 2015; Label: Collective Music Group; Format: Digital download	—	—	—	—
The Return of Cocaine Muzik	Released: August 6, 2015; Label: Collective Music Group; Format: Digital download	—	—	—	—
The Return of Cocaine Muzik Pt. 2	Released: August 14, 2015; Label: Collective Music Group; Format: Digital download	—	—	—	—
The Return	Released: September 11, 2015; Label: Collective Music Group; Format: Digital download	—	—	—	—
Cocaine Muzik 8: Any Hood America	Released: November 27, 2015; Label: Collective Music Group; Format: Digital download	—	—	—	—
2 Federal (with Moneybagg Yo)	Released: October 31, 2016; Label: N-Less Entertainment, Collective Music Group; Format: Digital download	97	48	—	3
White Friday (CM9)	Released: December 23, 2016; Label: Collective Music Group, Roc Nation, Epic; Format: Digital download	16	4	3	—
Gotti Made-It (with Mike Will Made It)	Released: June 1, 2017; Label: Self-released; Formats: Streaming, digital download	85	40	—	7
I Showed U So (with DJ Drama)	Released: August 4, 2023; Label: Inevitable, Interscope; Formats: Streaming	28	7	6	—
"—" denotes a recording that did not chart or was not released in that territory.

== Singles ==
=== As lead artist ===
List of singles, with selected chart positions, showing year released and album name
Title	Year	Peak chart positions							Certifications	Album
Title	Year	US	US R&B/HH	US Rap	US Main. R&B/HH	US Rhy.	AUS	CAN	Certifications	Album
"Full Time"	2005	—	—	—	—	—	—	—		Back 2 da Basics
"Gangsta Party" (featuring Bun B and 8Ball)	2005	—	80	—	—	—	—	—		Back 2 da Basics
"I Got Them" (featuring Lil Wayne and Birdman)	2006	—	—	—	—	—	—	—		Back 2 da Basics
"Let's Vibe" (featuring Pretty Ricky)	2007	—	70	—	35	—	—	—		Non-album single
"Sold Out"	2009	—	66	—	—	—	—	—		CM2
"5 Star"	2009	79	19	11	11	—	—	—	RIAA: Gold	Non-album singles
"Women Lie, Men Lie" (featuring Lil Wayne)	2009	81	22	12	16	38	—	—	RIAA: Gold	Non-album singles
"We Can Get It On"	2011	—	31	22	18	—	—	—		Live from the Kitchen
"Single"	2011	—	75	—	—	—	—	—		Live from the Kitchen
"I Got That Sack"	2012	—	46	—	24	—	—	—		January 10th: The Mixtape
"Act Right" (featuring Jeezy and YG)	2013	100	33	24	12	36	—	—	RIAA: Platinum	I Am
"King Shit" (featuring T.I.)	2013	—	55	—	26	—	—	—	RIAA: Gold	I Am
"Cold Blood" (featuring J. Cole and Canei Finch)	2013	—	50	—	18	—	—	—		I Am
"I Know" (featuring Rich Homie Quan)	2013	— (Note: "I Know" did not enter the Billboard Hot 100, but peaked at number one on the Bubbling Under Hot 100 chart.)	31	19	11	—	—	—	RIAA: 2× Platinum	I Am
"Errrbody"	2014	98	31	21	17	—	—	—	RIAA: Gold	Non-album singles
"Rihanna" (featuring Young Thug)	2015	—	—	—	36	—	—	—		Non-album singles
"Down in the DM" (solo or remix featuring Nicki Minaj)	2015	13	3	2	1	4	—	59	RIAA: 4× Platinum; RMNZ: Gold	The Return and The Art of Hustle
"Law" (featuring E-40)	2016	79	29	20	5	—	—	—	RIAA: Platinum	The Art of Hustle
"Champions" (with Kanye West, Gucci Mane, Big Sean, 2 Chainz, Travis Scott, Quavo and Desiigner)	2016	71	22	15	—	—	—	73	RIAA: Platinum	Non-album singles
"Wait for It" (featuring Blac Youngsta)	2016	—	—	—	—	—	—	—		Non-album singles
"Castro" (featuring Kanye West, Quavo, Big Sean, and 2 Chainz)	2016	— (Note: "Castro" did not enter the Billboard Hot 100, but peaked at number 16 on the Bubbling Under Hot 100 Singles chart.)	— (Note: "Castro" did not enter the Hot R&B/Hip-Hop Songs chart, but peaked at number six on the Bubbling Under R&B/Hip-Hop Singles chart.)	—	—	—	—	—		White Friday (CM9)
"Weatherman" (featuring Kodak Black)	2016	—	—	—	—	—	—	—		White Friday (CM9)
"Blah Blah Blah"	2017	—	—	—	—	—	—	—		White Friday (CM9)
"Rake It Up" (with Mike Will Made It featuring Nicki Minaj)	2017	8	5	3	2	1	124	49	RIAA: 5× Platinum; MC: 2× Platinum; RMNZ: Platinum	Gotti Made-It and I Still Am
"Juice"	2017	90	35	—	13	34	—	—	RIAA: Gold	I Still Am
"Put a Date on It" (featuring Lil Baby)	2019	46	21	20	13	—	—	—	RIAA: 2× Platinum	Untrapped
"Pose" (featuring Lil Uzi Vert or also Megan Thee Stallion)	2019	— (Note: "Pose" did not enter the Billboard Hot 100, but peaked at number eight on the Bubbling Under Hot 100 chart.)	—	—	28	—	—	—	RIAA: Platinum	Untrapped
"H.O.E. (Heaven On Earth)"	2020	— (Note: "H.O.E. (Heaven On Earth)" did not enter the Billboard Hot 100, but peaked at number 16 on the Bubbling Under Hot 100 chart.)	—	—	22	—	—	—		Untrapped
"Recession Proof"	2020	—	—	—	—	—	—	—		Non-album singles
"Stay Ur Distance"	2020	— (Note: "Stay Ur Distance" did not enter the Billboard Hot 100, but peaked at number 19 on the Bubbling Under Hot 100 chart.)	—	—	—	—	—	—		Non-album singles
"Wish List"	2020	—	—	—	—	—	—	—		Non-album singles
"Drop" (featuring DaBaby)	2021	—	—	—	36	—	—	—		Non-album singles
"For the Record"	2021	—	—	—	—	—	—	—		CM10: Free Game
"Cold Gangsta" (featuring 42 Dugg and EST Gee)	2022	— (Note: "Cold Gangsta" did not enter the Billboard Hot 100, but peaked at number two on the Bubbling Under Hot 100 chart.)	35	—	—	—	—	—		CM10: Free Game
"Steppers" (with Moneybagg Yo and 42 Dugg featuring EST Gee, Mozzy and Blac Youngsta)	2022	— (Note: "Steppers" did not enter the Billboard Hot 100, but peaked at number four on the Bubbling Under Hot 100 chart.)	26	—	—	—	—	—		Gangsta Art
"—" denotes a recording that did not chart.

=== As featured artist ===
List of singles, with selected chart positions, showing year released and album name
Title	Year	Peak chart positions						Certifications	Album
Title	Year	US	US R&B/HH	US Rap	CAN	FRA	UK	Certifications	Album
"Ridiculous" (DJ Drama featuring Gucci Mane, Yo Gotti, Lonnie Mac and OJ da Juiceman)	2009	—	104	—	—	—	—		Gangsta Grillz: The Album (Vol. 2)
"Blockstars" (DJ Kayslay featuring Ray J, Yo Gotti, Jim Jones and Busta Rhymes)	2009	—	—	—	—	—	—		More Than Just a DJ
"Hood Bitch Fetish" (Dorrough featuring Yo Gotti)	2010	—	92	—	—	—	—		Get Big
"All White Everything" (Young Jeezy featuring Yo Gotti)	2010	—	103	—	—	—	—		Non-album single
"Countin' Money" (Bun B featuring Yo Gotti and Gucci Mane)	2010	—	—	—	—	—	—		Trill OG
"I Know What She Like" (Yung Joc featuring Yo Gotti)	2011	—	91	—	—	—	—		Mr. Robinson's Neighborhood
"Hood Rich Anthem" (DJ Scream featuring 2 Chainz, Future, Waka Flocka Flame, Yo Gotti and Gucci Mane)	2012	—	96	—	—	—	—		Long Live the Hustle
"4 What" (DJ Drama featuring Young Jeezy, Yo Gotti and Juicy J)	2013	—	—	—	—	—	—		Non-album single
"Numb" (August Alsina featuring B.o.B and Yo Gotti)	2013	— (Note: "Numb" did not enter the Billboard Hot 100, but peaked at number 22 on the Bubbling Under Hot 100 chart.)	38	—	—	—	—	RIAA: Gold	Testimony
"Hoe" (Kirko Bangz featuring YG and Yo Gotti)	2014	—	60	—	—	—	—		Bigger Than Me
"Don't Worry 'Bout It" (50 Cent featuring Yo Gotti)	2014	—	42	—	—	—	165		Animal Ambition
"Yayo" (Snootie Wild featuring Yo Gotti)	2014	— (Note: "Yayo" did not enter the Billboard Hot 100, but peaked at number seven on the Bubbling Under Hot 100 chart.)	30	23	—	—	—		Go Mode
"Turn Up For a Check" (K Camp featuring Yo Gotti)	2014	—	34	—	—	—	—		In Due Time
"Maybe" (Teyana Taylor featuring Yo Gotti and Pusha T)	2014	— (Note: "Maybe" did not enter the Billboard Hot 100, but peaked at number 10 on the Bubbling Under Hot 100 chart.)	32	—	—	—	—	RIAA: Gold	VII
"Somethin' Right" (DJ Infamous featuring Big K.R.I.T. and Yo Gotti)	2014	—	—	—	—	—	—		Non-album singles
"Don't Shoot" (The Game featuring Rick Ross, 2 Chainz, Diddy, Fabolous, Wale, DJ Khaled, Swizz Beatz, Yo Gotti, Currensy, Problem, King Pharoah and TGT)	2014	—	53	—	—	—	—		Non-album singles
"Run the Check Up" (DJ Infamous featuring Jeezy, Ludacris and Yo Gotti)	2016	—	—	—	—	—	—		Talk 2 Me
"Better" (Meghan Trainor featuring Yo Gotti)	2016	—	—	—	—	—	—		Thank You
"Pills & Automobiles" (Chris Brown featuring A Boogie Wit da Hoodie, Kodak Black and Yo Gotti)	2017	46	24	13	67	136	—	RIAA: 2× Platinum; RMNZ: Platinum	Heartbreak On a Full Moon
"1942" (G-Eazy featuring Yo Gotti and YBN Nahmir)	2018	70	29	22	90	—	—	RIAA: Platinum; MC: Platinum; RMNZ: Gold	Uncle Drew
"Wraith" (T.I. featuring Yo Gotti)	2018	—	—	—	—	—	—		Dime Trap
"How Dat Sound" (Trey Songz featuring Yo Gotti and 2 Chainz)	2018	—	—	—	—	—	—		28
"Back" (Jeezy featuring Yo Gotti)	2020	— (Note: "Back" did not enter the Billboard Hot 100, but peaked at number 16 on the Bubbling Under Hot 100 chart.)	—	—	—	—	—		The Recession 2
"Blessed" (GloRilla featuring Yo Gotti)	2022	— (Note: "Blessed" did not enter the Billboard Hot 100, but peaked at number eight on the Bubbling Under Hot 100 chart.)	37	—	—	—	—	RIAA: Gold	Anyways, Life's Great
"—" denotes a recording that did not chart.

=== Promotional singles ===
List of singles, with selected chart positions, showing year released and album name
Title	Year	Peak chart positions	Album
Title	Year	US R&B/HH	Album
"5 Star" (Remix) (featuring Gucci Mane, Trina and Nicki Minaj)	2009	—	Live from the Kitchen
"Look In the Mirror"	2010	97	Non-album singles
"For the Hood" (featuring Gucci Mane)	2010	86	Non-album singles
"General" (featuring Future)	2016	—	The Art of Hustle
"More Ready Than Ever"	2020	—	Untrapped
"—" denotes a recording that did not chart.

== Other charted and certified songs ==
List of songs, with selected chart positions, showing year released and album name
Title	Year	Peak chart positions			Certifications	Album
Title	Year	US Bub.	US R&B/HH	US Main. R&B/HH	Certifications	Album
"Boo" (2 Chainz featuring Yo Gotti)	2010	—	76	—		Trap-A-Velli 2 (The Residue)
"Meet Me In the Tunnel" (Mo-Pain featuring Yo Gotti and Chubbie)	2011	—	95	—		Street Runnaz 61
"Harder" (featuring Rick Ross)	2012	—	106	—		Live from the Kitchen
"Check"	2012	—	—	25		CM7: The World Is Yours
"F-U" (featuring Meek Mill)	2013	—	60	—	RIAA: Gold	I Am
"Ghetto (Remix)" (August Alsina featuring Yo Gotti)	2014	15	37	—		Testimony
"Doin 2 Much" (with Moneybagg Yo)	2016	—	—	23	RIAA: Gold	2 Federal
"They Like" (feat. YFN Lucci)	2016	—	—	—	RIAA: Gold	White Friday (CM9)
"Dead Presidents" (Rick Ross featuring Future, Jeezy and Yo Gotti)	2017	22	—	—		Rather You Than Me
"Connect the Dots" (Meek Mill featuring Rick Ross and Yo Gotti)	2017	25	—	—		Wins & Losses
"Gangsta Art" (with Moneybagg Yo featuring Mozzy, EST Gee, 42 Dugg, Blac Youngsta and Lehla Samia)	2022	17	41	—		Gangsta Art
"—" denotes a recording that did not chart.

== Guest appearances ==
List of non-single guest appearances, with other performing artists, showing year released and album name
Title	Year	Other artist(s)	Album
"Cocked and Ready"	2002	Gangsta Blac, Kingpin Skinny Pimp, Mista Ian, Mo Money, Rap Hustlaz	The Mayor and the Pimp
"TV's (24's & Wang)"	2003	Kingpin Skinny Pimp, 8Ball, The Raphustlaz	Pimpin and Hustlin and Still Pimpin and Hustlin
"Stomp"	2003	Criminal Manne, Kingpin Skinny Pimp, Mista Ian	Play Time's Over
"What They Doin' (They Dikin')"	2003	Al Kapone	Goin' All Out
"Tennessee Titans"	2003	Tela, Haystak, Gangsta Boo, Project Playaz	Double Dose
"The Truth"	2004	The Blackout Squad	The Blackout Squad
"Street Know"	2004	The Blackout Squad	The Blackout Squad
"It's Tyme To Ride on 'Em"	2005	Daz Dillinger	Gangsta Crunk
"Real Hustlers"	2005	All Star Cashville Prince	Prince Of The Ville
"Looking at My Dog"	2005	Royce da 5'9", Ingrid Smalls	Independent's Day
"Work Hard, Play Hard"	2005	Block Burnaz	The Blackout Squad Volume 2
"Don't Play That"	2005	V Slash	The Blackout Squad Volume 2
"Drop It Off"	2006	La Chat, All Star	Bad Influence
"Baby Momma Drama"	2006	La Chat	Bad Influence
"Get Right"	2006	Lil Scrappy, Lil' Chris	Bred 2 Die Born 2 Live
"Work Wit It"	2006	Young Buck, All Star Cashville Prince	Welcome To The Traphouse
"Throw It Up"	2007	Twisted Black, Chyna Whyte	Street Fame
"My Posse"	2007	Prophet Posse, Pastor Troy, Scarfo, M.C. Mack	The Return, Part 1
"Cop It, Cook It"	2007	Prophet Posse, Kelo, 7:30	The Return, Part 1
"Money Ova"	2007	Huey, Diamond	Notebook Paper
"Keep It Gangsta"	2007	DJ Drama, Webbie, Lil Boosie	Gangsta Grillz: The Album
"We Gangsta"	2007	Birdman, All Star Cashville Prince	5 * Stunna
"Yeah She A Freak"	2008	Bohagon, M.I.G.	Crunk In HD
"Grind Hard For The Money"	2008	Young Buck	Starbucks
"Shoppin' Spree"	2008	Soulja Boy, Gucci Mane	iSouljaBoyTellem
"Street Boy"	2009	J-Money, Tremble	My Life Check Me Out
"Yams, Pt. 2"	2009	Triple C's	Custom Cars & Cycles
"Showing Out"	2009	Clipse	Til the Casket Drops
"Grind Head"	2009	All Star Cashville Prince, Young Buck	Cashville Takeover
"Bag It Up"	2009	Young Buck, All Star Cashville	Back On My Buck Shit
"Money Maker"	2009	Young Buck, All Star Cashville	Only God Can Judge Me
"Bricks"	2009	Gucci Mane, Yung Ralph	The State vs. Radric Davis
"Gangsta Shit"	2010	DJ Kay Slay, OJ da Juiceman, Papoose	More Than Just a DJ
"Do This Shit Again"	2010	Gucci Mane, Schife, Rick Ross	Burrrprint (2) HD
"Coca Coca"	2010	Gucci Mane, Rocko, OJ da Juiceman, Waka Flocka Flame, Shawty Lo, Nicki Minaj	Burrrprint (2) HD
"Slow the Car Down"	2010	Messy Marv, Gucci Mane	City Life
"This That"	2010	Keke Wyatt	Who Knew .(unreleased track)
"Whip It Like A Slave"	2010	Boo Rossini, Lil Wayne	601 To The 615
"My City"	2010	Paul Wall, Dallas Blocker	Heart of a Champion
"Summer Love"	2010	Sean Garrett, Bun B	The Inkwell
"Do It Again"	2010	Young Jeezy, Slick Pulla	The Last Laugh
"All White"	2010	Young Jeezy	The Last Laugh
"Boo"	2010	2 Chainz	Trap-A-Velli 2: (The Residue)
"Cocaine"	2010	Twista	The Perfect Storm
"Us"	2010	Rocko, Future	Rocko Dinero
"Broke"	2010	Nelly, Sophie Greene	5.0
Neighborhood Super Stars"	2010	Slim Thug, Nipsey Hussle	Tha Thug Show
"Nasty"	2011	Gorilla Zoe	King Kong
"Flexin'"	2011	Young Jeezy, Fabolous	The Real Is Back
"I'm Fly"	2011	Trae tha Truth	Street King
"ErrryThang"	2011	Ace Hood	Blood, Sweat & Tears
"Grizzly"	2011	Young Jeezy	The Real Is Back 2
"Bussin (Remix)"	2011	Trouble, Trae tha Truth, Waka Flocka Flame	—N/a
"Don't Panic"	2011	Meek Mill, Rick Ross	Dreamchasers
"A Southern Girl"	2011	Z-Ro	Meth
"Self Made"	2011	DJ Drama, Red Café	Third Power
"Translation"	2011	Gucci Mane, Cartel	Writing's on the Wall 2
"Slangin Birds"	2011	2 Chainz, Young Jeezy, Birdman	T.R.U. REALigion
"That Lowend" (Remix)	2012	Dorrough, Ace Hood, Nipsey Hussle "Highlights"	
"The Life" (Remix)	2012	Don Trip, Juicy J, Young Dolph	
"Blessing"	2012	Gucci Mane, Jadakiss	Trap Back
"In Love with a White Girl"	2012	Gucci Mane	Trap Back
"Traffickin'"	2012	Jadakiss, Young Jeezy	Consignment
"So Fly"	2012	Fly Society, Masspike Miles	International Passport
"Choppa Talk"	2012	Trae Tha Truth, Young Jeezy	The Blackprint
"What's Beef"	2012	Big Chief	—N/a
"It Ain't Funny"	2012	Gucci Mane	I'm Up
"Money Pile"	2012	Waka Flocka Flame, Gucci Mane, D Dash	Salute Me or Shoot Me 4 (Banned from America)
"She Bad"	2012	Caddy Da Don, Money	Cut The Check
"George Jetson"	2012	Alley Boy	The Gift Of Discernment
"Do It" (Remix)	2012	Mykko Montana, Nelly, Gucci Mane, Travis Porter, Jeremih, Nitti Beatz	—N/a
"Designer" (Remix)	2012	Chief Keef	—N/a
"Goin' Down"	2012	DJ Drama, Fabolous, T-Pain	Quality Street Music
"Mobbin" (Remix)	2012	Maino, Busta Rhymes, Jim Jones, Gucci Mane, Trae Tha Truth	The Mafia
"All White"	2012	Lil Durk	Life Aint No Joke
"Prolly"	2012	Don Trip	Help Is On The Way
"Hold Me Back" (Remix)	2012	Rick Ross, Gunplay, French Montana, Lil Wayne	—N/a
"Tryna Come Up" (Remix)	2012	Nino Brown, French Montana, Ace Hood	—N/a
"Definition Of A Plug"	2012	Gunplay	Cops N Robbers
"Going Down"	2012	Dondria	—N/a
"Grind Hard 4 The $$"	2012	Starlito, Young Buck, Robin Raynelle	Produced by Coop: The Starlito Tape
"Shake It"	2013	Rifah, Game	—N/a
"Clickin'"	2013	Juelz Santana	God Will'n
"Chasin Franklins"	2013	G Code	Straight Out Da Trap
"How Could I Forget"	2013	Eldorado Red	White Power
"Concrete Jungle"	2013	Eldorado Red	White Power
"Disrespect"	2013	Kirko Bangz	—N/a
"Lost Count"	2013	Lil Lody	Foolish 2
"Real Niggaz"	2013	Gillie Da Kid, Meek Mill	King of Philly 2
"Who U Wit"	2013	Verse Simmonds, Young Scooter, Trouble	—N/a
"Pussy and Fame"	2013	Chinx Drugz	Cocaine Riot 3
"Gangsta Of The Year"	2013	Funkmaster Flex, Young Jeezy, Jadakiss	Who You Mad At? Me Or Yourself?
"Dope"	2013	Los, Pusha T	Becoming King
"Tryna Do My thing"	2013	SBOE, Rocko	All We Got Is Us
"We Still In This Bitch" (Remix)	2013	B.o.B., Young Dro, Young Jeezy	—N/a
"Once Upon a Time"	2013	Jim Jones	Vampire Life
"Woke Up"	2013	Doughboyz Cashout, Young Jeezy	#It'sThaWorld
"4 What"	2013	DJ Drama, Young Jeezy, Juicy J	#It'sThaWorld
"Sellin Dope"	2013	Lil Snupe	R.N.I.C.
"Money Dance" (Remix)	2013	King Louie, French Montana	—N/a
"No Love"	2013	Alley Boy	War Cry
"Bricks"	2013	Wale, Lyfe Jennings	The Gifted
"Dreams Come True"	2013	Ace Hood, Mack Maine, Birdman	Rich Gang
"Pay The Rent"	2013	Juvenile, Young Jeezy	—N/a
"Heard You"	2013	Vado	Slime Flu 4
"Hold That"	2013	Sean Kingston	Back 2 Life
"Gallardo"	2013	Gunplay, Rick Ross, Trina	Self Made Vol. 3
"Kilo"	2013	Meek Mill, Louie V Gutta, French Montana	Self Made Vol. 3
"Drug Dealer Dream"	2013	Hardo	Pistolvania George
"Ciroc & Simply Lemonade"	2013	Nelly	M.O.
"What Would U Do"	2013	Cash Out	Ya Feel Me?
"Got It On My Own"	2013	Zed Zilla, Shy Glizzy	Time 2 Eat
"J's"	2013	Zed Zilla	Time 2 Eat
"Memphis Shit"	2013	Zed Zilla	Time 2 Eat
"Ain't Me"	2013	Meek Mill, Omelly	Dreamchasers 3
"Jungle"	2013	Cam'ron, T.I.	Ghetto Heaven, Vol. 1
"1st n 15th (I'm Addicted Skit)"	2013	Slim Thug	Boss Life
"Hallelujah"	2013	Trae Tha Truth, Jay'Ton	I Am King
"Stadium Music"	2014	Lil' Kim	Hard Core 2k14
"Kno No Better"	2014	Meek Mill	—N/a
"Um Hmm"	2014	T.I., Spodee	G.D.O.D. II
"Hot Nigga" (Remix)	2014	Bobby Shmurda, Fabolous, Chris Brown, Jadakiss, Busta Rhymes, Rowdy Rebel	—N/a
"Water Wet"	2015	Plane Jaymes	Concealed
"Bass Ackwards"	2015	Tech N9ne, Big Scoob, Lil Wayne	Special Effects
"Who Am I"	2015	K Camp	Only Way Is Up
"I Swear I Never Tell Another Soul"	2015	DJ Khaled, Future, Trick Daddy	I Changed a Lot
"Cross Me"	2015	Lil Wayne, Future	No Ceilings 2
"Order More" (Remix)	2016	G-Eazy, Lil Wayne	—N/a
"Rich"	2016	K. Michelle, Trina	More Issues Than Vogue
"Better"	2016	Meghan Trainor	Thank You
"Money Walk"	2016	Lil Durk	Lil Durk 2X
"Fuck Up the Club	2016	DJ Khaled, Future, Rick Ross, YG	Major Key
"Where It At"	2016	Jeezy	Trap or Die 3
"Club Again"	2017	Damar Jackson	Unfaithful
"I Don't Know You"	2017	Smokepurpp, Chief Keef	Deadstar
"That Range Rover Came With Steps"	2017	DJ Khaled, Future	Grateful
"Dead Presidents"	2017	Rick Ross, Future, Jeezy	Rather You Than Me
"SummerSeventeen"	2017	Rick Ross	Rather You Than Me
"Dark Into Light"	2017	Youngboy Never Broke Again	A.I Youngboy
"Connect The Dots"	2017	Meek Mill, Rick Ross	Wins & Losses
"Simple"	2017	Ty Dolla $ign	Beach House 3
"Stand Up" (Remix)	2017	Fabolous, Jadakiss, Future, Jeezy	Friday on Elm Street
"Still Don't Kno"	2018	Moneybagg Yo	2 Heartless
"Bands"	2018	Blac Youngsta, LunchMoney Lewis	223
"Full Time Trappa"	2018	King Los, O.T. Genasis	The 410 Survival Kit
"No Fakes"	2018	Red Cafe	Less Talk More Hustle
"Numbers"	2018	Belly	Immigrant
"Famous"	2018	Mozzy, Iamsu!, Dej Loaf	Gangland Landlord
"How Dat Sound"	2018	Trey Songz, 2 Chainz	28
"Talk" (Remix)	2019	Khalid, Megan Thee Stallion	—N/a
"Not A Rapper"	2020	42 Dugg, Lil Baby	Young and Turnt
"Broke Niggas"	2020	City Girls	City on Lock
"New Chain"	2020	Blac Youngsta, Moneybagg Yo	Code Red
"Excuse Me"	2020	BlocBoy JB	FatBoy
"Streets"	2020	Blac Youngsta, 42 Dugg	Fuck Everybody 3
"For Me"	2020	Rylo Rodriguez	G.I.H.F.
"Dope Game"	2020	YFN Lucci, Jeezy, Bigga Rankin	Wish Me Well 3
