= The Real Is Back 2 =

Mixtape by Jeezy
- Released: September 3, 2011
- Recorded: 2011
- Genre: Hip hop
- Length: 44:17
- Label: Corporate Thugz
- Producer: Lil Lody, Mike WiLL Made It, Beatz R Us, Krazyfigz

Jeezy chronology
The Real Is Back (2011)	The Real Is Back 2 (2011)	It's tha World (2012)

The Real Is Back 2 is the eleventh mixtape by American rapper Jeezy, it was released on September 3, 2011. The Mixtape features guest appearances from Birdman, Freddie Gibbs, JW, Slick Pulla, 211, Scrilla, and Yo Gotti.

== Reception ==
Professional ratings
Review scores
Source	Rating
XXL	(XL)

Ralph Bristout of XXL said "Served as an appetizer to TM103, The Real Is Back 2 is full of that uncut raw from the famous Trapstar, supplying plenty big beats and signature birdplay. The real has returned."

Phillip Mlynar at HipHopDX said "Beyond "Granted verse time on a quartet of tracks, the blend of Gibbs and Jeezy works stylistically, with the Gary gangsta's fleeter flow often flipping into double time and embellishing Jeezy's economic and guttural voice to smart effect. But too often Gibbs still sounds like a rapper yet to find the voice he's comfortable with. As singular in subject matter as Jeezy's trap raps can be, he always sounds like he believes what he's spitting, even when he's one-upping Kanye by claiming to use "Louis Vuitton toilet paper.""

== Track listing ==
No.	Title	Producer(s)	Length
1.	"Real Is Back 2 (Intro)"	Lil Lody	4:55
2.	"Trump" (featuring Birdman)	Izze The Producer	4:46
3.	"Chickens No Flour"	Lil Lody	3:16
4.	"Gotta See This" (featuring Freddie Gibbs and JW)	Lil Lody	4:33
5.	"Rough" (featuring Freddie Gibbs)	Lil Lody	3:07
6.	"All The Time" (featuring Slick Pulla)	Lil Lody	3:58
7.	"Bandana" (featuring 211)	Lil Lody	3:03
8.	"Nicks 2 Bricks" (featuring Freddie Gibbs)	Mike WiLL Made It	3:04
9.	"Grizzly" (featuring Yo Gotti)	Beatz R Us	4:08
10.	"Sittin low" (featuring Scrilla and Freddie Gibbs)	Mike WiLL Made It	4:42
11.	"Real Nigga Anthem"	Krazyfigz	4:45
