= The Real Is Back =

Mixtape by Young Jeezy
- Released: May 28, 2011
- Recorded: 2011
- Genre: Hip hop
- Length: 60:12
- Label: Corporate Thugz
- Producer: Lil Lody, Shawty Redd, D. Rich, Lex Luger, Drumma Boy, Midnight Black, DJ Squeeky, Metro Boomin, Supa Ced
- Compiler: DJ Drama

Young Jeezy chronology
The Last Laugh (2010)	The Real Is Back (2011)	The Real Is Back 2 (2011)

The Real Is Back is the tenth mixtape by American rapper Young Jeezy, It was released on May 28, 2011. The Mixtape features guest appearances from 211, Slick Pulla, Scrilla, Fabolous, Yo Gotti, Lil Wayne, 2 Chainz, Boo, Freddie Gibbs, and Alley Boy. "Ballin'" featuring Lil Wayne debuted and peaked at #57 on the Billboard Hot 100 and would eventually be included as a track on the deluxe edition of Jeezy's fourth studio album Thug Motivation 103: Hustlerz Ambition. Since the mixtape's release, it has been downloaded over 100k times on DatPiff, certifying the mixtape gold.

== Reception ==
Professional ratings
Review scores
Source	Rating
XXL	(XL)

Ralph Bristout of XXL reviewed the mixtape positively, praising the rapping, duo chemistry, and production of the record. Bristout criticized some of the production as occasionally repetitive, with the bass and drum lines sounding similar between some tracks.

== Track listing ==
No.	Title	Producer(s)	Length
1.	"The Real Is Back"	Lil Lody	4:37
2.	"How U Want It"	Lil Lody	4:36
3.	"Drama and Jeezy Speaks"		0:46
4.	"Win"	Shawty Redd, D. Rich	3:37
5.	"All the Money" (featuring 211)	Lex Luger	3:17
6.	"Snow Go" (featuring Slick Pulla)	Lil Lody	3:04
7.	"Broads" (featuring Scrilla and Slick Pulla)	Lil Lody	4:06
8.	"Flexin" (featuring Fabolous and Yo Gotti)	Drumma Boy	4:52
9.	"Ballin'" (featuring Lil Wayne)	Lil Lody	4:56
10.	"Rollin'" (featuring Fabolous)	Lil Lody	3:09
11.	"Slow Grind"	Midnight Black	2:43
12.	"Hoodstar" (featuring Slick Pulla)	DJ Squeeky	3:12
13.	"Count It Up" (featuring 2 Chainz)	Midnight Black	4:20
14.	"Talk About It" (featuring Boo and Scrilla)	Lil Lody	4:20
15.	"Run DMC" (featuring Freddie Gibbs)	Lil Lody	3:59
16.	"Count It on the Floor" (featuring Scrilla and Slick Pulla)	Lil Lody	4:12
17.	"Four" (featuring Alley Boy)	Metro Boomin	3:15
18.	"I Ball I Stunt" (featuring Scrilla)	SuperCed	4:40
19.	"Drama and Jeezy Speaks 2"		0:34
20.	"Do It for You" (featuring Freddie Gibbs)	Lil Lody	4:50
