= Rake It Up =

2017 single by Yo Gotti and Nicki Minaj

Single by Yo Gotti featuring Nicki Minaj

from the album Gotti Made-It and I Still Am
- Released: June 1, 2017
- Recorded: 2017
- Genre: Trap; crunk
- Length: 4:36
- Label: Epic; EMPIRE
- Songwriters: Mario Mims; Michael Williams II; Onika Maraj; Todd Shaw
- Producers: Mike WiLL Made-It; 30 Roc (co.)

Yo Gotti singles chronology
"Blah Blah Blah" (2017)	"Rake It Up" (2017)	"Pills & Automobiles" (2017)

Mike Will Made It singles chronology
"Perfect Pint" (2017)	"Rake It Up" (2017)	"Bring It Back" (2018)

Nicki Minaj singles chronology
"Swish Swish" (2017)	"Rake It Up" (2017)	"You da Baddest" (2017)

Music video
- Music video on YouTube

"Rake It Up" is a song recorded by American rapper Yo Gotti from his collaborative mixtape with record producer Mike WiLL Made-It titled Gotti Made-It (2017), featuring vocals by Nicki Minaj. The song also serves as the lead single from Gotti's ninth studio album, I Still Am. Produced by Mike WiLL Made-It and 30 Roc, the song was released on June 1, 2017. The song's music video premiered August 21 on Tidal, and was subsequently released on YouTube on August 26. The song peaked at number eight on the US Billboard Hot 100, making it Yo Gotti's first top 10 entry and most successful single to date. The song interpolates Too Short's "Freaky Tales".

== Background and release ==
After collaborating on "5 Star" (Remix), "Coca Coca" and "Down in the DM" (Remix); "Rake It Up" marks the fourth time Yo Gotti and Nicki Minaj have worked together on a recording. To promote the song, Gotti, on May 30, 2017, teased the song on his Snapchat during a private boat party. Minaj also played a snippet of the song on May 31, 2017, via her Instagram account, confirming that the track would be released the following day at midnight (EST). Soon after the song was announced, critics wrote how Minaj was probably trying to "steal a little of her ex-boyfriend's (Meek Mill) thunder", since he was very recently featured on another Yo Gotti song called "Top Lookin Down". On June 1, 2017, the song premiered online and was released worldwide as a download.

== Music video ==
The music video for the song premiered August 21, 2017, on Tidal, but was subsequently released on YouTube on August 26. It was shot in Miami, and features a guest appearance from Blac Chyna.

== Remixes ==
On July 17, 2017, DJ Funky released his remix of the song featuring new verses from American rappers Too $hort & T.I. Another remix titled "Rake It Up (MidWest Remix)" was uploaded to DJ Funky's official YouTube channel on August 8, 2017, and features new verses from American rappers Rich The Factor and The Popper. American rapper Plies released his remix of the song on YouTube. Colombian reggaeton artist Farina released her Spanish remix of the song on her official SoundCloud account on November 11, 2017.

== Live performances ==
On September 14, 2017, Gotti and Minaj performed the song on The Tonight Show Starring Jimmy Fallon. Minaj also performed the song during her Rolling Loud Festival performance on May 13, 2018, in Miami, preceded by "Chun-Li" and "MotorSport".

== Track listing ==
- Digital download
1. "Rake It Up" (featuring Nicki Minaj) – 4:36
- Digital download – Diplo & Party Favor Remix
1. "Rake It Up" (Diplo & Party Favor Remix) (featuring Nicki Minaj) – 2:52
- Digital download – Y2K Remix
1. "Rake It Up" (Y2K Remix) (featuring Nicki Minaj) – 4:08

== Charts ==
=== Weekly charts ===
Chart (2017)	Peak position
Australia (ARIA)	124
Canada (Canadian Hot 100)	49
Netherlands (Global Top 40)	28
US Billboard Hot 100	8
US Hot R&B/Hip-Hop Songs (Billboard)	5
US Pop Airplay (Billboard)	39
US Rhythmic Airplay (Billboard)	1

=== Year-end charts ===
Chart (2017)	Position
US Billboard Hot 100	53
US Hot R&B/Hip-Hop Songs (Billboard)	24
US Rhythmic (Billboard)	32

== Certifications ==
Region	Certification	Certified units/sales
Canada (Music Canada)	2× Platinum	160,000^{‡}
New Zealand (RMNZ)	Platinum	30,000^{‡}
United States (RIAA)	5× Platinum	5,000,000^{‡}
^{‡} Sales+streaming figures based on certification alone.

== Release history ==
Region	Date	Format	Version	Label	Ref.
Various	June 1, 2017	Digital download	Original	Self-released	
United States	October 10, 2017	Contemporary hit radio	Original	Epic	
Various	October 26, 2017	Digital download	Diplo & Party Favor Remix	Epic; Sony	
Various	October 26, 2017	Digital download	Y2K Remix	Epic; Sony	

== See also ==
- List of Billboard Rhythmic number-one songs of the 2010s
