= Blood Moon: Year of the Wolf =

Compilation album by the Game
- Released: October 14, 2014
- Recorded: 2013–14
- Genre: Hip hop
- Length: 60:05
- Label: Blood Money; eOne
- Producer: The Game; Cash Jones; Stat Quo; Boi-1da; Cozmo; Duke Dinero; Cool & Dre; Isabella Summers; Jereme Jay; Jordan Mosley; Dupri; Matthew Burnett; The Mekanics; Nottz; OZ; Ocean & Nova; Rey Reel; Sap; SRKN; Yung Ladd

The Game chronology
Jesus Piece (2012)	Blood Moon: Year of the Wolf (2014)	The Documentary 2 (2015)

Singles from Blood Moon: Year of the Wolf
- 1. "Bigger Than Me" Released: June 16, 2014; 2. "Or Nah" Released: July 1, 2014

Blood Moon: Year of the Wolf is the second compilation album by American rapper the Game. It was released on October 14, 2014, by Blood Money Entertainment and eOne Music. The album was supported by two singles: "Bigger Than Me" and "Or Nah". Upon its release, Blood Moon: Year of the Wolf received generally mixed reviews from music critics. The album debuted at number 7 on the Billboard 200, selling 33,000 copies in its first week of release.

== Background ==
In December 2012, the Game founded a new record label, Rolex Records, along with a fellow American rapper Stat Quo. Following its founding, he bought his entire team at the record label Rolex watches. After a six-month legal battle with Rolex, he was forced to change the name and logo of the record label. He officially would then change the name of the label to The Firm, which then became Blood Money Entertainment. The label signed West Coast rappers Skeme and Dubb as its first two artists.

== Promotion ==
On June 16, 2014, the Game released the album's first single "Bigger than Me". The song heavily samples rock group Poliça's 2013 single "Warrior Lord". The second single off of Year of the Wolf, titled "Or Nah" was released on July 1, 2014 The album was originally scheduled to be released on September 16, 2014 but was pushed back a month for last minute touches and changes. The Game held a contest in which the fans could design the album cover. He found it so difficult to pick a cover that he pushed back the winners announcement twice. Finally, on September 4, 2014 he announced that Instagram user "xoramos661" had made the cover he would use for the album.

== Critical response ==
Professional ratings
Review scores
Source	Rating
AllMusic	3/5 stars
HipHopDX	3/5 stars
XXL	4/5 (XL)

Blood Moon: Year of the Wolf received mixed reviews from music critics. David Jeffries of AllMusic said, "More a misrepresentation than a failure, Blood Moon is a loose label comp that would do fine living in the forgiving lands of stopgap and second tier. Labeled as a Game album proper, it's a serious dip." Kellan Miller of XXL stated, "With a heavy heart and head against the backdrop of soulful, funereal sounding instrumentals, The Game puts together two of the deepest, enduring cuts in his entire catalog." However, he characterizes much of the album as "filler". Dean Mayorga of HipHopDX said, "The album ultimately fails in establishing a balance and plunges into unfocused aggression."

== Commercial performance ==
The album debuted at number seven on the Billboard 200, with sales of 33,000 copies in the United States. In its second week, the album dropped to number 31 on the chart, selling 9,000 copies. The album has sold 80,000 copies as of October 2015.

== Track listing ==
No.	Title	Producer(s)	Length
1.	"Bigger Than Me"	Jordan Mosley	5:31
2.	"F.U.N."	Matthew Burnett	3:05
3.	"Really" (featuring Yo Gotti, 2 Chainz, Soulja Boy, and T.I.)	The Mekanics; OZ	5:27
4.	"Fuck Yo Feelings" (featuring Lil Wayne and Chris Brown)	Ocean & Nova	3:36
5.	"On One" (featuring King Marie and Ty Dolla Sign)	Isabella Summers	3:14
6.	"Married to the Game" (featuring French Montana, Dubb, and Sam Hook)	Boi-1da	4:40
7.	"The Purge" (featuring Stacy Barthe)	Cozmo	5:14
8.	"Trouble On My Mind" (performed by Dubb and Jake&Papa)	Cash Jones; Stat Quo; SRKN	2:58
9.	"Cellphone" (featuring Dubb)	The Mekanics	3:59
10.	"Best Head Ever" (featuring Tyga and Eric Bellinger)	Dupri	3:39
11.	"Or Nah" (featuring Too Short, Problem, AV, and Eric Bellinger)	Dre	4:14
12.	"Take That" (performed by Tyga and Pharaoh Prophet)	Jereme Jay	3:04
13.	"Food For My Stomach" (performed by Dubb and Skeme)	Duke Dinero	4:16
14.	"Hit Em Hard" (featuring Bobby Shmurda, Freddie Gibbs, and Skeme)	Amadeus	4:41
15.	"Black on Black" (featuring Young Jeezy and Kevin Gates)	The MeKanics; Yung Ladd	5:11

Deluxe edition (bonus tracks)
No.	Title	Producer(s)	Length
16.	"Mad Flows" (performed by Skeme)	Rey Reel	3:28
17.	"Bloody Moon" (featuring Shateish)	Nottz	3:08

iTunes Store deluxe edition bonus track
No.	Title	Producer(s)	Length
18.	"I Just Wanna Be" (featuring Stat Quo, Sap, and King Marie)	Sap	4:24

Best Buy deluxe edition bonus track
No.	Title	Producer(s)	Length
17.	"Be Nobody Else" (featuring AV, Stacy Barthe, and Uiie)	Sap	5:08

== Charts ==
=== Weekly charts ===
Chart (2014)	Peak position
Australian Albums (ARIA)	27
Austrian Albums (Ö3 Austria)	36
Canadian Albums (Billboard)	8
German Albums (Offizielle Top 100)	47
Scottish Albums (OCC)	57
Swiss Albums (Schweizer Hitparade)	36
UK Albums (OCC)	60
UK Album Downloads (OCC)	24
UK Independent Albums (OCC)	10
UK R&B Albums (OCC)	5
US Billboard 200	7
US Independent Albums (Billboard)	2
US Top R&B/Hip-Hop Albums (Billboard)	1

=== Year-end charts ===
Chart (2014)	Position
US Top R&B/Hip-Hop Albums (Billboard)	59
