= Or Nah =

Or Nah may refer to:

- "Or Nah" (Ty Dolla Sign song), 2014
- "Or Nah" (The Game song), 2014
