= We Can Get It On (song) =

2011 song by Yo Gotti

Single by Yo Gotti featuring Kayla Shelton or Ciara

from the album Live from the Kitchen
- Released: May 10, 2011
- Genre: Hip hop, R&B
- Length: 3:50
- Label: Polo Grounds Music; J Records
- Songwriters: Mario Mims; Curtis Gholson
- Producer: Drumma Boy

Yo Gotti singles chronology
| "For the Hood" (2010) | "We Can Get It On" (2011) | "Act Right" (2013) |

"We Can Get It On" is the first single from Yo Gotti's fifth album, Live from the Kitchen. It was released on iTunes on May 10, 2011, for digital download.

== Background ==
The song originally leaked in 2010 featuring R&B singer Ciara. But on the single's release date of May 10, 2011, Ciara's vocals were replaced by female singer Kayla Shelton & the bridge by Ciara was removed.

== Music video ==
The music video was released on June 22, 2011. It was directed by Gabriel Hart. The video shows Yo Gotti sitting on the side of a pool performing to the camera and holding his girlfriend. There is also a scene where Yo Gotti is standing against a car. Ciara was not featured in the music video.

== Chart performance ==
As of the week of July 9, 2011, "We Can Get It On" had charted at number 23 on US Billboard Hot Rap Songs. The song debuted on the US Hot R&B/Hip-Hop Songs chart 16 weeks before it debuted on the rap chart. The week of July 23, 2011, it had peaked at number 31 on the Hot R&B/Hip-Hop chart.

== Charts ==
| Chart (2011) | Peak position |
|---|---|
| US Hot R&B/Hip-Hop Songs (Billboard) | 31 |
| US Hot Rap Songs (Billboard) | 22 |
