= Juice (Yo Gotti song) =

Single by Yo Gotti

Single by Yo Gotti

from the album I Still Am
- Released: October 10, 2017
- Genre: Hip hop
- Length: 2:29
- Label: Epic
- Songwriters: Mario Mims; Benjamin Diehl; Khaled Khaled
- Producer: Ben Billions

Yo Gotti singles chronology
"Either Way (Remix)" (2017)	"Juice" (2017)	"What You Like" (2017)

Music video
- "Juice" on YouTube

"Juice" is a song by American rapper Yo Gotti, released on October 10, 2017, as the second single from his ninth studio album I Still Am (2017). Produced by Ben Billions and co-written by DJ Khaled, it peaked at number 90 on the Billboard Hot 100 chart.

== Background ==
In an interview with Billboard, Yo Gotti said:

Me and my producer Ben Billions were trying to create a song that when it comes on, people immediately feel good, feel like partying, which we call a vibe. I like to make music from a personal standpoint, and the music that feels good to me, and when the music becomes big, it's even better because it's an even more organic feeling than when you, like, tried to make the hit record. When the record turns out to be as big as ["Juice"], that's a great feeling.

== Composition ==
In the song, Yo Gotti makes references to jewelry, as well as to a line in Cardi B's "Bodak Yellow". Rose Lilah of HotNewHipHop described the song as having a "simple rhyme scheme" with drums and hi-hats in its "minimal production".

== Music video ==
A music video for the song was released on November 30, 2017. It sees Yo Gotti in a fur coat draped with diamonds, showing his jewelry and a "flashy vehicle" while surrounded by "gorgeous women".

== Charts ==
Chart (2018)	Peak position
US Billboard Hot 100	90
US Hot R&B/Hip-Hop Songs (Billboard)	35
US Rhythmic Airplay (Billboard)	34

== Certifications ==
Region	Certification	Certified units/sales
United States (RIAA)	Gold	500,000^{‡}
^{‡} Sales+streaming figures based on certification alone.
