= I Still Am =

Studio album by Yo Gotti
- Released: October 27, 2017
- Genre: Hip-hop
- Length: 44:48
- Label: Epic; Roc Nation; CMG
- Producer: 30 Roc; Ayo; Ben Billions; Drumma Boy; Keyz; Hitmaka; Mike Will Made It; Murda Beatz; London on da Track; Rasool Diaz; Southside; Zaytoven

Yo Gotti chronology
Gotti Made-It (2017)	I Still Am (2017)	Untrapped (2020)

Singles from I Still Am
- 1. "Rake It Up" Released: June 1, 2017; 2. "Juice" Released: October 10, 2017

I Still Am is the ninth studio album by American rapper Yo Gotti. It was released on October 27, 2017, by Epic Records, Roc Nation and Collective Music Group. The album features guest appearances from Nicki Minaj, Chris Brown, YFN Lucci and Meek Mill, French Montana and 21 Savage. I Still Am serves as the titular follow-up sequel to Gotti's seventh album I Am (2013). It was supported by two singles – "Rake It Up" and "Juice". The album debuted at number six on the US Billboard 200 chart, selling 38,000 album-equivalent units in its first week.

== Background ==
On October 10, 2017, Yo Gotti revealed the album's title, release date, tracklist and pre-order. Yo Gotti, in partnership with Tidal will release a documentary in preparation of the album.

== Singles ==
"Rake It Up" featuring Nicki Minaj, was released previously on Yo Gotti's collaborative mixtape Gotti Made-It and serves as the album's lead single. "Juice" was released on October 10, 2017, as a promotional single then sent to radio October 17, 2017, as the second single.

== Critical reception ==
Professional ratings
Review scores
Source	Rating
AllMusic	3/5 stars
Pitchfork	6.1/10

Andy Kellman of AllMusic gave the album three out of five stars, saying " There's nothing particularly novel on this, but it's an adequate addition to the survivor's discography." Sheldon Pearce of Pitchfork said that the album "has more to say about the city he represents than who he actually is", defining the songs "Rake It Up" and "Save It for Me" as standout moments of the album.

== Commercial performance ==
I Still Am debuted at number six on the US Billboard 200 chart, earning 38,000 album-equivalent units (including 19,000 in traditional album sales) in its first week of release. It became Yo Gotti's third consecutive top ten debut on the chart. The album ended up spending a total of 13 weeks. On February 12, 2020, the album was certified gold by the Recording Industry Association of America (RIAA) for combined sales and album-equivalent units of over 500,000 units in the United States.

== Track listing ==
I Still Am
No.	Title	Writer(s)	Producer(s)	Length
1.	"Betrayal"	Mario Mims; Joshua Luellen; London Holmes	Southside; London on da Track	4:25
2.	"Back Gate"	Mims; Benjamin Diehl; Khaled Khaled	Ben Billions	3:12
3.	"Brown Bag"	Mims; Xavier Dotson	Zaytoven	2:48
4.	"Rake It Up" (featuring Nicki Minaj)	Mims; Michael Williams; Onika Maraj; Todd Shaw	Mike Will Made It; 30 Roc^{[a]}	4:36
5.	"Juice"	Mims; Diehl; Khaled	Ben Billions	2:29
6.	"Different"	Mims; Dotson	Zaytoven	3:23
7.	"Save It for Me" (featuring Chris Brown)	Mims; Christopher Brown; Diehl; Khaled; Kevin Cossom; Gamal Lewis	Ben Billions	3:57
8.	"2908"	Mims; Diehl; Khaled; Norman Keith	Ben Billions	3:42
9.	"One on One" (featuring YFN Lucci and Meek Mill)	Mims; Shane Lindstrom; Rayshawn Bennett; Robert Williams	Murda Beatz	3:50
10.	"Oh Yeah" (featuring French Montana)	Mims; Karim Kharbouch; Christian Ward; Austin Owens; James Foye III; Darwin Turner; Terius Gray; Byron Thomas	Ayo; Keyz; Hitmaka	3:11
11.	"Yellow Tape" (featuring 21 Savage)	Mims; Shayaa Abraham-Joseph; Lindstrom; Rasool Diaz	Murda Beatz; Rasool Diaz	3:24
12.	"Don't Wanna Go Back"	Mims; Christopher Gholson	Drumma Boy	3:28
13.	"Around the World"	Mims; Diehl; Khaled	Ben Billions	2:23
Total length:				44:48

Notes

- ^{^[a]} signifies an co-producer
- "One on One" features background vocals from Desiigner

Sample credits

- "Rake It Up" contains a sample of "Freaky Tales", written and as performed by Too Short.
- "2908" contains a sample of "How Can I Pretend" as performed by The Continental IV, written by Norman Keith.
- "Oh Yeah" contains a sample of "Choppa Style", as performed by Choppa.

== Charts ==
Chart (2017)	Peak position
Canadian Albums (Billboard)	74
US Billboard 200	6
US Top R&B/Hip-Hop Albums (Billboard)	4

== Certifications ==
Region	Certification	Certified units/sales
United States (RIAA)	Gold	500,000^{‡}
^{‡} Sales+streaming figures based on certification alone.
