= Pose (Yo Gotti song) =

Single by Yo Gotti featuring Lil Uzi Vert

from the album Untrapped
- Released: August 23, 2019
- Genre: Hip hop
- Length: 2:50
- Label: Epic
- Songwriters: Benjamin Diehl; Jason Silber; Julian Bohorquez; Mario Mims; Salomon Naar; Symere Woods
- Producers: Ben Billions; Julian Beatz; SoundsbyBreezy

Yo Gotti singles chronology
"Put a Date on It" (2019)	"Pose" (2019)	"H.O.E (Heaven On Earth)" (2020)

Lil Uzi Vert singles chronology
"Pull Up" (2019)	"Pose" (2019)	"Reply" (2019)

Music video
- "Pose" on YouTube

"Pose" is a song by American rapper Yo Gotti featuring fellow American rapper Lil Uzi Vert. It was released through Epic Records on August 23, 2019.

== Background and composition ==
The release of "Pose" was confirmed in an Epic Records press release. Yo Gotti announced the song via Instagram hours before its release, along with a snippet and artwork.

"Pose" has heavy bass, with Gotti rapping about first-world problems which he faces because of his success and wealth. The song makes use of the sound of a camera shutter. Gotti describes a love-hate relationship through the lyrics, making use of metaphors about posing for pictures.

== Remix ==
The song's remix was released on October 18, 2019, with an additional feature from Megan Thee Stallion. This was included as a track on Gotti's Untrapped (2020) with the original being featured as a bonus track. The music video for the remix premiered January 2020 on his Vevo account.

== Critical reception ==
David Renshaw of The Fader described "Pose" as a "snap-happy" track, adding that Vert was in a "more confident place" than Gotti. HipHopDX's Chris Patrick called the song a "high caliber single", and stated that it "proves Gotti isn't playing around this year and could be the closest we get to hearing Uzi's Eternal Atake for a while.

== Charts ==
Chart (2020)	Peak position
US Bubbling Under Hot 100 (Billboard)	8
US R&B/Hip-Hop Airplay (Billboard)	40

== Certifications ==
Region	Certification	Certified units/sales
United States (RIAA)	Platinum	1,000,000^{‡}
^{‡} Sales+streaming figures based on certification alone.

== Release history ==
Region	Date	Format	Label	Ref.
Various	August 23, 2019	Digital download; streaming	Epic	
United States	September 10, 2019	Rhythmic contemporary	Epic	
