= Don't Shoot (The Game song) =

2014 single by the Game

Single by the Game featuring Rick Ross, 2 Chainz, Diddy, Fabolous, Wale, DJ Khaled, Swizz Beatz, Yo Gotti, Currensy, Problem, King Pharaoh and TGT
- Released: August 27, 2014
- Recorded: 2014
- Length: 6:08
- Songwriters: Jayceon Taylor; William Roberts; Tauheed Epps; Sean Combs; John Jackson; Olubowale Akintimehin; Khaled Khaled; Kasseem Dean; Mario Mims; Shante Franklin; Jason Martin; King Pharaoh; Tyrese Gibson; Elgin Lumpkin; Durrell Babbs
- Producers: Luney Tunez; Isabella Summers

The Game singles chronology
"Or Nah" (2014)	"Don't Shoot" (2014)	"Ryda" (2015)

Rick Ross singles chronology
"New Flame" (2014)	"Don't Shoot" (2014)	"Vamonos" (2015)

2 Chainz singles chronology
"Drop Girl" (2014)	"Don't Shoot" (2014)	"Burnin' Up" (2014)

Diddy singles chronology
"I Want the Love" (2014)	"Don't Shoot" (2014)	"Finna Get Loose" (2015)

Fabolous singles chronology
"Know You Better" (2014)	"Don't Shoot" (2014)	"Lituation" (2014)

Wale singles chronology
"You Don't Know What to Do" (2014)	"Don't Shoot" (2014)	"The Body" (2014)

DJ Khaled singles chronology
"Hold You Down" (2014)	"Don't Shoot" (2014)	"How Many Times" (2015)

Swizz Beatz singles chronology
"Hands Up" (2013)	"Don't Shoot" (2014)	"Jason" (2015)

Yo Gotti singles chronology
"Errrbody" (2014)	"Don't Shoot" (2014)	"Rihanna" (2014)

Currensy singles chronology
"Jet Life" (2012)	"Don't Shoot" (2014)	"Bottom of the Bottle" (2015)

Problem singles chronology
"Or Nah" (2014)	"Don't Shoot" (2014)	"My Cutie Pie" (2015)

TGT singles chronology
"Next Time Around" (2014)	"Don't Shoot" (2014)

"Don't Shoot" is a single by American rapper the Game featuring Rick Ross, 2 Chainz, Diddy, Fabolous, Wale, DJ Khaled, Swizz Beatz, Yo Gotti, Currensy, Problem, King Pharoah and recording group TGT performing the chorus. The Game's daughter also joins in at the end but is uncredited. The song is a tribute to Michael Brown.

== Background ==
The song was released in the United States on August 27, 2014. A number of other songs came out soon after the furor over the shooting of Michael Brown and perceived similar incidents, such as "Be Free" by J. Cole and "Black Rage" by Lauryn Hill. "Don't Shoot" mentions other black men killed under notorious circumstances, such as Emmett Till, Ezell Ford, Trayvon Martin, and Sean Bell.

== Charts ==
Chart (2014)	Peak position
US Bubbling Under R&B/Hip-Hop Songs (Billboard)	3
