= Put a Date on It =

2019 song by Yo Gotti and Lil Baby

Single by Yo Gotti featuring Lil Baby

from the album Untrapped
- Released: January 25, 2019
- Genre: Hip hop
- Length: 3:15
- Label: Epic; CMG
- Songwriters: Dominique A. Jones; June James; Mario S. G. Mims; DeMario D. White; Ramiro A. Morales
- Producer: James

Yo Gotti singles chronology
"How Dat Sound" (2018)	"Put a Date on It" (2019)	"Pose" (2019)

Music video
- "Put a Date on It" on YouTube

"Put a Date on It" is a song by American rapper Yo Gotti featuring American rapper Lil Baby. It was released on January 25, 2019, and served as the lead single from his Gotti's tenth studio album Untrapped. The song features a songwriting credit from fellow rapper Moneybagg Yo.

== Composition ==
The song is composed in E major. Its instrumental features a brass instrument.

== Music video ==
The music video was released on January 28, 2019.

== Charts ==
=== Weekly charts ===
Chart (2019)	Peak position
US Billboard Hot 100	46
US Hot R&B/Hip-Hop Songs (Billboard)	21
US Rhythmic Airplay (Billboard)	28

=== Year-end charts ===
Chart (2019)	Position
US Hot R&B/Hip-Hop Songs (Billboard)	53

== Certifications ==
Region	Certification	Certified units/sales
United States (RIAA)	2× Platinum	2,000,000^{‡}
^{‡} Sales+streaming figures based on certification alone.
