= Errrbody =

2014 single by Yo Gotti

Single by Yo Gotti
- Released: July 10, 2014
- Genre: Hip hop
- Length: 4:21
- Label: Epic
- Songwriter: Mario Mims
- Producer: Nonstop Da Hitman

Yo Gotti singles chronology
"Main Chick (Remix)" (2014)	"Errrbody" (2014)	"Don't Shoot" (2014)

Music video
- "Errrbody" on YouTube

"Errrbody" is a single by American rapper Yo Gotti, released on July 10, 2014, by Epic Records. The song is about Gotti talking about mainstream rappers being similar to one another, and pretending to be who they aren't despite their status. "Errrbody" peaked at numbers 29 and 98 on the Billboard Hot R&B/Hip-Hop Songs and Hot 100 charts respectively. It was certified Gold by the Recording Industry Association of America (RIAA), denoting sales of over 500,000 units in the United States. An accompanying music video for the single, directed by Benny Boom, follows a group of suburban kids getting involved with street life and finding it not for them the hard way. An official remix of the song was released in October 2014 and featured Lil Wayne and Ludacris.

== Composition ==
The song was produced by Nonstop Da Hitman, featuring "icy synth and tightrope tense hi-hats". It sees Yo Gotti rapping about how rappers in the music industry are acting similarly and pretending to be what they are not, whether it be being rich, "from the hood", or a drug dealer.

== Music video ==
A music video for the song was released on August 12, 2014. Directed by Benny Boom, it follows a group of suburban kids becoming involved in "thug life", and finding out the hard way that it is not for them.

== Remix ==
The official remix of the song was released on October 6, 2014, featuring rappers Lil Wayne and Ludacris. Wayne's verse has been considered reminiscent to that of his "mixtape days", and was praised by Yo Gotti, who called it a "classic Lil Wayne verse".

== Charts ==
Chart (2014)	Peak position
US Billboard Hot 100	98
US Hot R&B/Hip-Hop Songs (Billboard)	29

== Certifications ==
Region	Certification	Certified units/sales
United States (RIAA)	Gold	500,000^{‡}
^{‡} Sales+streaming figures based on certification alone.
