= Life (Yo Gotti album) =

Studio album by Yo Gotti
- Released: May 13, 2003
- Recorded: 2002–03
- Genre: Southern hip-hop; gangsta rap
- Length: 1:19:40
- Label: TVT
- Producer: DJ Slice Tee; Drumma Boy; Kia Shine; Paragon; Swizzo; The Rap Hustlaz; Yo Gotti

Yo Gotti chronology
Self-Explanatory (2001)	Life (2003)	Back 2 da Basics (2006)

Life is the fourth studio album by American rapper Yo Gotti. It was released on May 13, 2003, via TVT Records, serving the rapper's major-label debut and first studio release with the label. Production was handled by the Rap Hustlaz, Paragon, DJ Slice T, Drumma Boy, Swizzo, and Yo Gotti himself, with co-producers DJ Squeeky and Lil' Jon. It features guest appearances from Kia Shine, Ericka Kane, Lil' Jon & the East Side Boyz, Rich Bum, T-Stit, Da Block Burnaz, D'Nero, Jack Frost, Lil' Flip, Shane and V-Slash. In the United States, the album peaked at number 59 on the Top R&B/Hip-Hop Albums and number 38 on the Independent Albums charts.

== Critical reception ==
Professional ratings
Review scores
Source	Rating
AllMusic	3/5 stars

AllMusic's writer Jason Birchmeier awarded the album three out of five stars and described it as "typical of the genre". Matt Gonzales of PopMatters also gave the album a lukewarm review, viewing Yo Gotti as "lyrically indistinguishable from a sea of bitter, street-hustling rappers exactly like himself". Geoff Harkness, writing for The Pitch saw merit in Gotti's lyrics, but opined that "the played-out beats, the hoary "Dirty South" shout-outs and Gotti's perfunctory delivery ... hinder the album beyond repair". The Memphis Flyer commented on the "vintage Def Jam-style production" and "facility with R&B hooks", and viewed the album as revealing "a wider range of musical and emotional options than is usually heard on Memphis rap records". Kelefa Sanneh of The New York Times, reviewing his next album, described Life as "an uncelebrated gem". Several reviewers commented on the cover art, with Gonzales stating that from the cover the album could be mistaken "for a Wayans Brothers project skewering the worn-out conventions of hardcore rap". Harkness described the cover showing Yo Gotti "surrounded by snazzy cars, diamond-encrusted hubcaps and a flurry of $100 bills -- not exactly indicators that songs about the current political climate or uplifting one's spiritual self will be found inside."

== Track listing ==
No.	Title	Writer(s)	Producer(s)	Length
1.	"Intro"	Mario Mims; Randy Banks; Nakia Coleman; Andre Stephens	Swizzo; Yo Gotti	3:56
2.	"All I Ever Wanted to Do" (featuring Kia Shine)	Mims; Coleman; Stephens	The Rap Hustlaz; DJ Squeeky (co.); Yo Gotti (co.)	4:03
3.	"Sell My Dope" (featuring Kia Shine & Ericka Kane)	Mims; Coleman; Stephens; Sheldon Arrington	The Rap Hustlaz; Slice T	4:24
4.	"Dirty South Soldiers" (featuring Lil' Jon & the East Side Boyz)	Mims; Jonathan Smith; Coleman; Stephens	The Rap Hustlaz; Yo Gotti; Lil' Jon (co.)	4:57
5.	"Reppin' North Memphis"	Mims; Coleman; Stephen Carroll; Stephens	Kia Shine; Paragon; Yo Gotti	3:06
6.	"Str8 from da North" (featuring Ericka Kane)	Mims; Coleman; Carroll; Stephens	Kia Shine; Paragon; Yo Gotti	4:35
7.	"Get Down" (featuring Lil' Flip)	Mims; Wesley Weston; Coleman; Carroll; Stephens	Kia Shine; Paragon; Yo Gotti	4:12
8.	"After I Fuck Ya Bitch" (Remix)	Mims; Coleman; Stephens	Yo Gotti; Slice T (co.); The Rap Hustlaz (co.)	4:37
9.	"Entering the Game"	Mims; Coleman; Stephens; Chris Gallinger	The Rap Hustlaz; Yo Gotti; Drumma Boy	3:52
10.	"Life" (featuring Ericka Kane)	Mims; Coleman; Stephens; Gallinger	The Rap Hustlaz; Yo Gotti; Drumma Boy	4:07
11.	"9 to 5"	Mims; Carroll; Stephens	Kia Shine; Paragon	3:17
12.	"Breakaman"	Mims; Coleman; Stephens	The Rap Hustlaz; DJ Squeeky (co.); Yo Gotti (co.)	4:22
13.	"Shake It" (featuring Rich Bum)	Mims; Coleman; Stephens; Gallinger	The Rap Hustlaz; Yo Gotti; Drumma Boy	2:56
14.	"Look at Old Girl" (featuring Da Block Burnaz, D'Nero, Shane & T-Stit)	Mims; Coleman; Stephens; Arrington	The Rap Hustlaz; Slice T; Yo Gotti	4:50
15.	"On da Grind"	Mims; Coleman; Gallinger	The Rap Hustlaz; Yo Gotti; Drumma Boy	3:22
16.	"U Understand" (featuring T-Stit)	Mims; Thomas Stitman; Coleman; Stephens; Gallinger	The Rap Hustlaz; Yo Gotti; Drumma Boy	4:53
17.	"Mr. Tell It"	Mims; Coleman; Stephens	The Rap Hustlaz; Yo Gotti	4:49
18.	"Dirty South Soldiers (Rap Hustlaz Remix)" (featuring Jack Frost, Kia Shine, V Slash, Lil' Jon & the East Side Boyz)	Mims; Smith; Coleman; Stephens	The Rap Hustlaz; Yo Gotti; Lil' Jon (co.)	5:38
19.	"Pop Kone" (featuring Kia Shine & Rich Bum)	Mims; Coleman; Marshall Johns; Stephens; Arrington	The Rap Hustlaz; Slice T; Yo Gotti	3:44
Total length:				1:19:40

== Charts ==
Chart (2003)	Peak position
US Top R&B/Hip-Hop Albums (Billboard)	59
US Independent Albums (Billboard)	38
