= Or Nah (The Game song) =

2014 single by The Game

Single by The Game featuring Too Short, Problem, AV, King Marie and Eric Bellinger

from the album Blood Moon: Year of the Wolf
- Released: July 1, 2014
- Recorded: 2014
- Genre: West Coast hip hop
- Length: 4:14
- Label: Blood Money; Fifth Amendment; eOne
- Songwriters: Jayceon Taylor; Todd Shaw; Jason Martin
- Producer: Dre

The Game singles chronology
"All That (Lady)" (2014)	"Or Nah" (2014)	"Don't Shoot" (2014)

Too Short singles chronology
"Loyal" (2013)	"Or Nah" (2014)

Problem singles chronology
"Walk Thru" (2014)	"Or Nah" (2014)	"Don't Shoot" (2014)

Eric Bellinger singles chronology
"Or Nah" (2014)

"Or Nah" is a song by American rapper The Game, released as the second single from his 2014 compilation Blood Moon: Year of the Wolf. The song features additional vocals from fellow rappers Too Short, Problem, AV, King Marie and American R&B singer Eric Bellinger. The track samples Too Short's 1989 song "Don't Fight the Feelin'"

== Music video ==
The video of Or Nah was released on September 8, 2014, on YouTube.

== Chart performance ==
Chart (2014)	Peak position
US Bubbling Under R&B/Hip-Hop Singles (Billboard)	9
US Rhythmic Airplay (Billboard)	29

== Release history ==
Region	Date	Format(s)	Label(s)	Ref.
United States	July 29, 2014	Urban contemporary radio	EOne	
