= Act Right =

Single by Yo Gotti featuring Jeezy and YG

from the album I Am
- Released: June 7, 2013
- Recorded: 2013
- Genre: Hip hop
- Length: 4:10
- Label: CMG; Epic
- Songwriters: Mario Mims; Jay Jenkins; Keenon Jackson; Osten Harvey Jr.; Paulo Ytienza Rodriguez; Roger Troutman; Christopher Wallace
- Producer: P-Lo

Yo Gotti singles chronology
"We Can Get It On" (2011)	"Act Right" (2013)	"King Shit" (2013)

Young Jeezy singles chronology
"Pour It Up (Remix)" (2013)	"Act Right" (2013)	"My Nigga" (2013)

YG singles chronology
"You Broke" (2013)	"Act Right" (2013)	"My Nigga" (2013)

"Act Right" is a song by American rapper Yo Gotti. The song was released on June 7, 2013, as the first single from his sixth studio album I Am. The song produced by HBK Gang member P-Lo, features American rappers Jeezy and YG. The song peaked at number 100 on the 2013 US Billboard Hot 100.

== Remix ==
In tandem with the instrumental provided by Bay Area producer and The HBK Gang member P-Lo, the official remix of the song features a verse from the group's lead member, rapper Iamsu!.

== Music video ==
On July 24, 2013, the music video for the track was released. It was directed by Alex Nazari and was filmed in Oakland, California.

== Charts ==
Chart (2013)	Peak position
US Billboard Hot 100	100
US Hot R&B/Hip-Hop Songs (Billboard)	33

== Certifications ==
Region	Certification	Certified units/sales
United States (RIAA)	Platinum	1,000,000^{‡}
^{‡} Sales+streaming figures based on certification alone.

== Release history ==
Country	Date	Format	Label
United States	June 7, 2013	Digital download	CMG, Epic
