= Untrapped =

Studio album by Yo Gotti
- Released: January 31, 2020
- Label: Epic; Roc Nation; CMG
- Producer: Ben Billion$; Streetrunner; Tarik Azzouz; 1500 or Nothin'; 30 Roc; Blaqnmild; Cubeatz; Denaro Love; IV Beats; Julian Beatz; June James; Lamont Porter; Mark Davon; Rock Boy Beats; Schife; SoundsByBreezy; Southside; Tay Keith; Yung Ladd

Yo Gotti chronology
I Still Am (2017)	Untrapped (2020)	CM10: Free Game (2022)

Singles from Untrapped
- 1. "Put a Date on It" Released: January 25, 2019; 2. "Pose" Released: August 23, 2019; 3. "H.O.E. (Heaven on Earth)" Released: January 23, 2020; 4. "More Ready Than Ever" Released: January 30, 2020

Professional ratings
Review scores
Source	Rating
RapReviews	7.5/10

Untrapped is the tenth studio album by American rapper Yo Gotti. It was released through Epic Records, Roc Nation and Collective Music Group on January 31, 2020, marking Gotti's fourth and final album under his initial Epic Records contract. It features guest appearances from Lil Uzi Vert, A Boogie wit da Hoodie, Blac Youngsta, Estelle, Lil Baby, Megan Thee Stallion, Moneybagg Yo, Rick Ross and Ty Dolla Sign.

== Commercial performance ==
Untrapped debuted at number ten on the US Billboard 200 chart, earning 35,000 album-equivalent units (including 7,000 in pure album sales) in its first week. This became Yo Gotti's fourth consecutive top-ten debut on the chart.

== Track listing ==
Untrapped track listing
No.	Title	Writer(s)	Producer(s)	Length
1.	"Trapped"	Mario Mims; Bishop Charles Lyles; Fred Washington; Nicholas Warwar; Tarik Azzouz	Streetrunner; Tarik Azzouz	2:24
2.	"Know Yo Worth"	Mims	Ben Billions	3:40
3.	"H.O.E. (Heaven on Earth)"	Mims; Lamont Porter; Mark Davon	EZ Elpee; Mark Davon	3:12
4.	"More Ready Than Ever"	Mims; Warwar; Azzouz	StreetRunner; Azzouz; 8X8 BOCCI; Street Symphony	3:56
5.	"Like That" (featuring A Boogie Wit Da Hoodie and Ty Dolla Sign)	Mims; Artist Dubose; Tyrone Griffin, Jr.; Brian D. Pickens; Damian Aubrey; Gamal Lewis; Mark Hudson	Rock Boy Beats; Yung Ladd	3:27
6.	"Put a Date on It" (featuring Lil Baby)	Mims; Dominique Jones; June James; Ramiro Morales	James; Ramy On The Beat	3:15
7.	"They Ain't Want Me to Know"	Mims	Ben Billions; Schife Karbeen	2:55
8.	"Pose" (featuring Lil Uzi Vert and Megan Thee Stallion)	Mims; Symere Woods; Megan Pete; Benjamin Diehl; Jason Silber; Julian Bohorquez; Salomon Naar	Ben Billions; Julian Beatz; SoundsByBreezy; TheonlyDiet	3:46
9.	"Weekend" (featuring Moneybagg Yo)	Mims; Demario White, Jr.; Diehl	Ben Billions; SoundsByBreezy	3:08
10.	"Dopechella" (featuring Rick Ross)	Mims; William Roberts II; Joshua Luellen; Kevin Gomringer; Tim Gomringer	Southside; Cubeatz	4:26
11.	"Battle" (featuring Blac Youngsta)	Mims; Sammie Benson; Adarius Moragne; Aubrey; Samuel Gloade	30 Roc; Datboisqueeze	3:00
12.	"Bounce That"	Mims; Adam Pigott; Brytavious Chambers; Aubrey; Denaro Love; IV Beats	Blaqnmild; Denaro Love; IV Beats; Tay Keith	3:24
13.	"Big Homie Rules"	Mims; Aubrey; Darryl Pearson; Khirye Tyler; Larrance Dopson	1500 or Nothin'	4:54
14.	"Untrapped" (featuring Estelle)	Mims; Warwar; Azzouz	StreetRunner; Azzouz	4:04
15.	"Pose" (featuring Lil Uzi Vert) (bonus track)	Mims; Woods; Diehl; Silber; Bohorquez; Naar	Ben Billions; Julian Beatz; SoundsByBreezy; TheonlyDiet	2:50
Total length:				52:35

== Charts ==
Chart performance for Untrapped
Chart (2020)	Peak position
US Billboard 200	10
US Top R&B/Hip-Hop Albums (Billboard)	6

== Certifications ==
Certifications for Untrapped
Region	Certification	Certified units/sales
United States (RIAA)	Gold	500,000^{‡}
^{‡} Sales+streaming figures based on certification alone.
