= Live from the Kitchen =

Studio album by Yo Gotti
- Released: January 10, 2012
- Recorded: 2009–11
- Genre: Hip hop
- Length: 49:45
- Label: Polo Grounds; RCA
- Producer: Yo Gotti (exec.); Bryan Leach (exec.); Mark Williams (exec.); Drumma Boy; Lil' Lody; Lex Luger; Mike WiLL Made It; Big K.R.I.T.; Shawty Redd; DJ Montay; Drumma Drama; Hot Rod

Yo Gotti chronology
Back 2 da Basics (2006)	Live from the Kitchen (2012)	I Am (2013)

Alternative cover
- Alternate cover

Singles from Live from the Kitchen
- 1. "We Can Get It On" Released: May 9, 2011; 2. "Single" Released: August 5, 2011

Live from the Kitchen is the sixth studio album by American rapper Yo Gotti. It was released on January 10, 2012, by Polo Grounds Music; distributed by RCA Records. The album was supported by two singles: "We Can Get It On" and "Single".

RCA Records officially released this album, despite Yo Gotti's former record label J Records being shut down by Sony Music Entertainment, alongside these other labels; including Arista Records and Jive Records. The album has been marked as his first official release with Polo Grounds Music alongside the distribution by RCA Records.

== Singles ==
The album's lead single, "We Can Get It On" was released for digital download on May 9, 2011. The song peaked at numbers 22 and 31 on the Hot Rap Songs and Hot R&B/Hip-Hop Songs charts respectively.

The album's second single, "Single" was released for digital download on August 5, 2011. The song peaked at number 75 on the Hot R&B/Hip-Hop Songs chart.

=== Promotional singles ===
The album's promotional single, "5 Star" was available for digital download on June 11, 2009. The song became Gotti's most successful single on the chart, as it peaked at number 79 on the US Billboard Hot 100. The remix to "5 Star", which features guest vocals from fellow rappers Gucci Mane, Trina, and Nicki Minaj, was released for digital download on November 9, 2009.

The album's second promotional single, "Women Lie, Men Lie" featuring Lil Wayne, was released for digital download on December 11, 2009. The song peaking at number 81 on the Billboard Hot 100.

=== Other songs ===
Upon the album's release, "Harder" featuring Rick Ross, debuted at number 6 on the US Bubbling Under R&B/Hip-Hop Songs chart.

== Reception ==
=== Critical reception ===
Professional ratings
Aggregate scores
Source	Rating
Metacritic	59/100
Review scores
Source	Rating
AllMusic	3.5/5 stars
HipHopDX	2.5/5 stars
Pitchfork	5.6/10
Slant Magazine	2/5 stars
XXL	(L)

Live from the Kitchen garnered mixed reviews from music critics. At Metacritic, which assigns a normalized rating out of 100 to reviews from mainstream critics, the album received an average score of 59, based on 5 reviews.

AllMusic's David Jeffries called it "a cocaine-talking, fishscale-dreaming beast of an album with no likeable characters and a bit of a schizophrenia problem. The latter issue is easily overlooked and excused thanks to Gotti's love of being reckless, while the former problem will be embraced by fans of T.I., Young Jeezy, and other lawless snowmen." He concluded that: "but the thrill of watching this hood star threaten to supernova is a real high, one that comes with no life-ruining side effects or any chance of Sosa's men storming your mansion." Mark Lelinwalla of XXL wrote that: "Although Gotti gets lost on the shuffle on "Go Girl," which has him on one crowded track with Big K.R.I.T., Big Sean, Wale and Wiz Khalifa, overall, the album has a good balance of solo tracks and features, with the female-friendly "We Can Get It On" serving as a nice change-up to the hard hustling tone of the album. Now, get in the kitchen and listen. Gotti!" Phillip Mlynar of HipHopDX called it "the most predictable rap album you could ever listen to." He concludes by writing that: "On the plus side? Mercifully, at least Live From The Kitchen is only 11 tracks long, and there are enough cameos and singles to fuel your party bus. That’s something, right?" Matthew Cole of Slant Magazine felt that Gotti was a supporting player on his own album with a track listing that overuses the "Women Lie, Men Lie" formula to "showcase an expensive sound system, not a talented rapper." He concluded that: "As with so many of the tracks on Live from the Kitchen, the material isn't good, and Yo Gotti doesn't strain himself trying to save it."

=== Commercial performance ===
Live from the Kitchen debuted at number 12 on the Billboard 200, with 16,000 copies in its first week of sales in the United States. By February 2012, the album sold 36,000 copies in the United States.

== Track listing ==
No.	Title	Writer(s)	Producer(s)	Length
1.	"Testimony"	Mario Mims; Montay Humphrey	DJ Montay	5:16
2.	"Harder" (featuring Rick Ross)	Mims; William Roberts II; Antonie "Lil' Lody" Kearney	Lil' Lody	4:13
3.	"Killa"	Mims; Demetrius Stewart	Shawty Redd	6:07
4.	"Red, White & Blue" (featuring Jadakiss)	Mims; Jason Phillips; Mike "Drumma Drama" Smith	Drumma Drama	4:41
5.	"Single"	Mims; Kearney	Lil' Lody	3:30
6.	"Second Chance"	Mims; Lexus Lewis	Lex Luger	4:08
7.	"Cases" (featuring 2 Chainz)	Mims; Tauheed Epps; Michael L. Williams II	Mike WiLL Made It	4:24
8.	"Letter"	Mims; Kearney	Lil' Lody	5:50
9.	"Go Girl" (featuring Big K.R.I.T., Big Sean, Wale and Wiz Khalifa)	Mims; Cameron Thomaz; Sean Anderson; Justin Scott; Olubowale Akintimehin	Big K.R.I.T.	3:45
10.	"We Can Get It On" (featuring Kayla Shelton)	Mims; Curtis Gholson	Drumma Boy	3:47
11.	"5 Star (Remix)" (featuring Gucci Mane, Trina and Nicki Minaj)	Mims; Onika Maraj; Radric Davis; Katrina Taylor; Rodney "Hot Rod" Tate	Hot Rod	4:04

Notes

- "Single" features additional vocals from Stuey Rock.
- "Go Girl" credits a guest appearance and songwriting contribution from American rapper Wale, despite him not appearing on any known versions.

== Charts ==
=== Weekly charts ===
Chart (2012)	Peak position
US Billboard 200	12
US Top R&B/Hip-Hop Albums (Billboard)	4

=== Year-end charts ===
Chart (2012)	Position
US Top R&B/Hip-Hop Albums (Billboard)	87
