= Women Lie, Men Lie =

Single by Yo Gotti featuring Lil Wayne

from the album Live from the Kitchen (Intended)
- Released: December 15, 2009; 16 years ago
- Recorded: 2009; 17 years ago
- Genre: Hip hop
- Length: 4:01
- Label: Inevitable Entertainment, Polo Grounds Music, J Records
- Songwriters: Ray Bradford, Dwayne Carter, Seneca Cayson, Mario Sentell Giden
- Producers: Bradd Young, Seneca Cayson

Yo Gotti singles chronology
"5 Star" (2009)	"Women Lie, Men Lie" (2009)	"Look In the Mirror" (2010)

"Women Lie, Men Lie" is a single by American rapper Yo Gotti. It features rapper Lil Wayne. It was released on iTunes on December 15, 2009, for digital download. The track samples the Jay-Z song "Reminder" released earlier that year.

== Background ==
Following his signing to J Records in 2009, Yo Gotti began to record material for his debut studio album, titled Live from the Kitchen. "5 Star", the first single released from the album, became Gotti's first song to appear on the US Billboard Hot 100, peaking at number 79. In an interview with HipHopDX, Gotti revealed that he had recorded a song with Lil Wayne for the album, although the title was not announced at the time. Following its leak online, "Women Lie, Men Lie" was released for digital download on December 14, 2009, originally as the second single from Live from the Kitchen. However, Live from the Kitchen experienced several delays to its release date which meant it was not released until January 10, 2012, and "5 Star" (although it is present in a remixed form featuring fellow rappers Gucci Mane, Trina and Nicki Minaj) and "Women Lie, Men Lie" were removed from the album's track listing. "We Can Get It On", a collaboration with singer Ciara, was later released as the new first single from the album on May 19, 2011.

== Composition ==
"Women Lie, Men Lie" is backed by a propulsive, "swaggering" electronica-based production. It is of three minutes and 36 seconds in length, and the song's concept and title were inspired by lyrics from fellow rapper Jay-Z's song "Reminder", from his album The Blueprint 3 (2009).

== Music video ==
The music video debuted on BET. It features a story about a girl. Lil Wayne filmed this video before his jail sentence.

== Charts ==
=== Weekly charts ===
Chart (2010)	Peak position
US Billboard Hot 100	81
US Hot R&B/Hip-Hop Songs (Billboard)	22
US Hot Rap Songs (Billboard)	12

=== Year-end charts ===
Chart (2010)	Peak position
US Hot R&B/Hip-Hop Songs (Billboard)	75
US Hot Rap Songs (Billboard)	47

== Certifications ==
Region	Certification	Certified units/sales
United States (RIAA)	Gold	500,000^{‡}
^{‡} Sales+streaming figures based on certification alone.
