= Gotti Made-It =

Mixtape by Yo Gotti and Mike Will Made It
- Released: June 1, 2017
- Recorded: 2017
- Genre: Hip-hop
- Length: 28:08
- Label: Gotti Made-It; EMPIRE
- Producer: Mike WiLL Made-It; Pluss; Scooly; 30 Roc; TL On The Beat; Resource; Blue Cheeze

Yo Gotti chronology
White Friday (CM9) (2016)	Gotti Made-It (2017)	I Still Am (2017)

Mike Will Made It chronology
Ransom 2 (2017)	Gotti Made-It (2017)	Edgewood (2018)

Singles from Gotti Made-It
- 1. "Rake It Up" Released: June 1, 2017

Gotti Made-It is a collaborative commercial mixtape by American rapper Yo Gotti and record producer Mike WiLL Made-It. It was released on June 1, 2017.

== Track listing ==
Gotti Made-It
No.	Title	Writer(s)	Producer(s)	Length
1.	"Legacy"	Mario Mims; Michael Williams II; Asheton Hogan	Mike WiLL Made-It; Pluss	2:29
2.	"Trap Go Hard"	Mims; Williams; Hogan; Marcus Bell	Mike WiLL Made-It; Pluss; Scooly	3:07
3.	"Dogg"	Mims; Williams	Mike WiLL Made-It	3:06
4.	"Look At Me Na"	Mims; Samuel Gloade; Williams	30 Roc; Mike WiLL Made-It	2:11
5.	"Rake It Up" (featuring Nicki Minaj)		Mike WiLL Made-It; 30 Roc	4:35
6.	"Change"		Mike WiLL Made-It; Scooly; TL On The Beat	2:47
7.	"Letter 2 the Trap"		Mike WiLL Made-It; Resource	3:32
8.	"Off da Pole"		Mike WiLL Made-It; Resource	2:42
9.	"Thinking About You"		Mike WiLL Made-It; Blue Cheeze	3:39
Total length:				28:08

== Personnel ==
- Yo Gotti – primary artist
- Make WiLL Made-It – primary artist, producer
- Nicki Minaj – featured artist
- Pluss – producer
- Scooly – producer
- 30 Roc – producer
- TL On The Beat – producer
- Resource – producer
- Blue Cheeze – producer
- Leo Goff – mixer
- Steve "The Sauce" Hybicki – mixer

== Charts ==
Chart (2017)	Peak position
US Billboard 200	85
US Independent Albums (Billboard)	7
US Top R&B/Hip-Hop Albums (Billboard)	40
