= Back 2 da Basics =

Studio album by Yo Gotti
- Released: May 23, 2006
- Genre: Southern hip-hop
- Length: 1:13:54
- Label: TVT
- Producer: DJ Slice Tee; Drumma Boy; Fate Eastwood; J$Mil; Kellen; Scott Storch; Six July; Swizzo

Yo Gotti chronology
Life (2003)	Back 2 da Basics (2006)	Live from the Kitchen (2012)

Singles from Back 2 da Basics
- 1. "Full Time" Released: August 2, 2005; 2. "Gangsta Party" Released: November 22, 2005; 3. "I Got Them/That's What They Made It Foe" Released: May 16, 2006

Professional ratings
Review scores
Source	Rating
AllHipHop	3.5/5 stars
AllMusic	3.5/5 stars
HipHopDX	3/5
RapReviews	7.5/10
XXL	L (3/5)

Back 2 Da Basics is the fifth studio album by American rapper Yo Gotti. It was released on May 23, 2006, through TVT Records, marking his second and final studio album for the label. Production was handled by Carlos "6 July" Broady, Swizzo, Fate Eastwood, DJ Slice T, Drumma Boy, J$Mil, Kellen and Scott Storch. It features guest appearances from D'Nero, 8Ball, Birdman, Bun B, Jazze Pha, La Chat, Lil' Wayne and Starlito. The album peaked at number 86 on the Billboard 200, number 6 on both the Top R&B/Hip-Hop Albums and the Tastemakers, number 3 on the Top Rap Albums and number 2 on the Independent Albums charts in the United States.

== Track listing ==
No.	Title	Producer(s)	Length
1.	"That's What's Up (Intro)"		4:14
2.	"I Got Them" (featuring Lil' Wayne and Baby)	Fate Eastwood	4:53
3.	"Full Time"	Swizzo	4:41
4.	"Where I'm At"	Slice T	3:51
5.	"U a Gangsta Rite?"	J$Mil	4:07
6.	"Spend It Cuz U Got It" (featuring All Star Cashville Prince)	Six July	4:37
7.	"Cold Game"	Swizzo	4:34
8.	"Gangsta Party" (featuring Bun B and 8Ball)	Six July	4:56
9.	"That's What They Made It Foe" (featuring Pooh Bear)	Scott Storch	4:20
10.	"25 to Life"	Six July	3:51
11.	"That's Not Yo Bitch"	Swizzo	4:15
12.	"Shawty Violating (Wup That Hoe)" (featuring La Chat)	Kellen	4:48
13.	"I'm a Thug" (featuring D'Nero)	Fate Eastwood	4:30
14.	"We Gonna Be Alright"	Six July	4:57
15.	"A Part of Thugs" (featuring Jazze Pha)	Six July	3:30
16.	"Warrior"	Drumma Boy	3:51
17.	"Shawty" (featuring D'Nero)	Swizzo	3:59
Total length:			1:13:54

Sample credits

- Track 2 contains elements of "Big Tymers" performed by Big Tymers and "Fireman" performed by Lil' Wayne.
- Track 8 contains a sample of "Far Cry" performed by Marvin Gaye.
- Track 10 contains elements of "My Other Love" performed by Bunny Sigler.
- Track 14 contains elements of "Misunderstood" performed by The Undisputed Truth.
- Track 15 contains elements of "What Am I Waiting For" performed by The O'Jays.

== Charts ==
Chart (2006)	Peak position
US Billboard 200	84
US Top R&B/Hip-Hop Albums (Billboard)	6
US Top Rap Albums (Billboard)	3
US Independent Albums (Billboard)	2
