= The Art of Hustle =

Studio album by Yo Gotti
- Released: February 19, 2016
- Recorded: 2014–15
- Genre: Hip hop
- Length: 44:04
- Label: Epic; CMG
- Producer: Yo Gotti (exec.); Ink; Ben Billions; Schife; Big Fruit; Kane Beatz; TODAY; Luca Polizzi; Timbaland; Milli Beatz; Remo the Hitmaker; Bangladesh; Street Symphony; Infamous; Drumma Boy; Richie Souf; Honorable C.N.O.T.E.; Neenyo; Gnyus

Yo Gotti chronology
I Am (2013)	The Art of Hustle (2016)	2 Federal (2016)

Deluxe edition cover

Singles from The Art of Hustle
- 1. "Down in the DM" Released: October 27, 2015; 2. "Law" Released: March 28, 2016

Professional ratings
Review scores
Source	Rating
AllMusic	4/5 stars

The Art of Hustle is the eighth studio album by American rapper Yo Gotti. It was released on February 19, 2016, by Epic Records and Yo Gotti's CMG record label. The album was supported by two singles: "Down in the DM", and "Law" featuring E-40.

The album debuted at number four on the US Billboard 200 chart, 61,000 album-equivalent units in its first week.

== Singles ==
"Down in the DM" was released as the album's first single on October 27, 2015. The song was produced by Ben Billions and Schife. The music video for the single premiered on February 4, 2016 via Gotti's VEVO channel. The song has peaked at number 13 on the US Billboard Hot 100 chart.

"Law" featuring E-40, was sent to rhythmic crossover radio March 28, 2016, as the album's second official single. The song was produced by Big Fruit. The music video of the song was released on April 7, 2016. The song has peaked at number 79 on the US Billboard Hot 100.

== Commercial performance ==
The Art of Hustle debuted at number four on the US Billboard 200 chart, 61,000 album-equivalent units, (including 45,000 copies sold) in its first week. The album ended up spending a total of 24 weeks. On December 7, 2018, the album was certified gold by the Recording Industry Association of America (RIAA) for combined sales and album-equivalent units of over 500,000 units in the United States.

== Track listing ==
The Art of Hustle – Standard version
No.	Title	Writer(s)	Producer(s)	Length
1.	"My City" (featuring K. Michelle)	Mario Mims; Kimberly Pate; Atia "Ink" Boggs	Neenyo; Ink	3:49
2.	"Bible" (featuring Lil Wayne)	Mims; Dwayne Carter, Jr.; Benjamin Diehl	Ben Billions	4:14
3.	"Down in the DM"	Mims; Diehl; Ian Lewis; Khaled Khaled	Ben Billions; Schife	3:02
4.	"Law" (featuring E-40)	Mims; Earl Stevens; Leland Clopton	Big Fruit	4:17
5.	"The Art of Hustle"	Mims; Nickolas Ashford; Valerie Simpson; Daniel Johnson; Vinay Vyas; Justin Davey; Luca Polizzi	Kane Beatz; TODAY; Polizzi	3:25
6.	"Smile" (featuring Timbaland)	Mims; Chris Godbey; Timothy Mosley; Jetmir Salii	Timbaland; Milli Beatz	3:52
7.	"Come Up"	Mims; Remo Green	Remo the Hitmaker	2:56
8.	"Pay the Price"	Mims; Shondrae Crawford	Bangladesh	3:13
9.	"Momma"	Mims; Marsha Ambrosius; Vidal Davis; Andre Harris; Torrance Esmond	Street Symphony	4:37
10.	"General" (featuring Future)	Mims; Diehl; Marco Rodriguez-Diaz; Nayvadius Wilburn	Ben Billions; Infamous	3:34
11.	"Imagine Dat"	Mims; Christopher Gholson	Drumma Boy	3:48
12.	"Bank Teller"	Mims; Tony Son	Richie Souf	3:17
Total length:				44:04

The Art of Hustle – Deluxe version
No.	Title	Writer(s)	Producer(s)	Length
13.	"Hunnid" (featuring Pusha T)	Mims; Terrence Thornton; Carlton Mays, Jr.	Honorable C.N.O.T.E.	3:52
14.	"Luv Deez Hoes" (featuring 2 Chainz)	Mims; Tauheed Epps; Mays, Jr.	Honorable C.N.O.T.E.	3:47
15.	"Down in the DM (Remix)" (featuring Nicki Minaj)	Mims; Diehl; Lewis; Khaled; Onika Maraj	Ben Billions; Schife	4:18
Total length:				56:01

The Art of Hustle – Best Buy deluxe edition
No.	Title	Writer(s)	Producer(s)	Length
15.	"Get Out Your Feelings"	Mims; Sean Seaton	Neenyo	3:32
16.	"One Day"	Mims; Gian Bravo	Gnyus	3:35
Total length:				58:50

== Charts ==
=== Weekly charts ===
Chart (2016)	Peak position
US Billboard 200	4
US Top R&B/Hip-Hop Albums (Billboard)	1

=== Year-end charts ===
Chart (2016)	Position
US Billboard 200	130
US Top R&B/Hip-Hop Albums (Billboard)	28

== Certifications ==
Region	Certification	Certified units/sales
United States (RIAA)	Gold	500,000^{‡}
^{‡} Sales+streaming figures based on certification alone.

== Release history ==
List of release dates, showing region, formats, label, editions and reference
Region	Date	Format(s)	Label	Edition(s)	Ref.
United States	February 19, 2016	CD; digital download	Epic; CMG	Standard; deluxe; Best Buy	
