= Law (song) =

Single by Yo Gotti featuring E-40

from the album The Art of Hustle
- Released: March 28, 2016
- Genre: Hip hop
- Length: 4:17
- Label: Epic; CMG
- Songwriters: Mario Mims; Earl Stevens; Leland Clopton
- Producer: Big Fruit

Yo Gotti singles chronology
"Order More" (2016)	"Law" (2016)	"Champions" (2016)

E-40 singles chronology
"Saved" (2015)	"Law" (2016)	"All the Way Up (Westside remix)" (2016)

"Law" is a single by American rapper Yo Gotti from his eighth studio album, The Art of Hustle (2016), and features American rapper E-40. It was released on March 28, 2016, as the second single from the album. The song was produced by Big Fruit.

== Music video ==
The music video for the single premiered on April 7, 2016, via Yo Gotti's VEVO channel. Stand-up comedian Lil Duval appears in the video.

== In popular culture ==
In September 2016, the song was played in the second episode of comedy-drama television series Atlanta's first season.

== Charts ==
=== Weekly charts ===
Chart (2016)	Peak position
US Billboard Hot 100	79
US Hot R&B/Hip-Hop Songs (Billboard)	29

=== Year-end charts ===
Chart (2016)	Position
US Hot R&B/Hip-Hop Songs (Billboard)	90

== Certifications ==
Region	Certification	Certified units/sales
United States (RIAA)	Platinum	1,000,000^{‡}
^{‡} Sales+streaming figures based on certification alone.
