= CM10: Free Game =

Studio album by Yo Gotti
- Released: February 4, 2022
- Genre: Hip hop
- Label: CMG; Inevitable

Yo Gotti chronology
Untrapped (2020)	CM10: Free Game (2022)

Professional ratings
Review scores
Source	Rating
AllMusic	3.5/5 stars
HipHopDX	3.8/5
Pitchfork	6.8/10

CM10: Free Game is the eleventh studio album by American rapper Yo Gotti. It was released on February 4, 2022, via Collective Music Group/Inevitable Entertainment. It features guest appearances from 42 Dugg, Blac Youngsta, EST Gee, Kodak Black, Moneybagg Yo, Shenseea and DaBaby. The album debuted at number three on the US Billboard 200 albums chart with the first-week consumption sales of 46,000 copies.

== Track listing ==
Side A
No.	Title	Length
1.	"Collect Calls (Ring Ring)"	2:40
2.	"Giving Back"	2:11
3.	"Cold Gangsta" (featuring 42 Dugg and EST Gee)	3:31
4.	"Bad Behavior"	2:39
5.	"Ya Bih" (featuring Moneybagg Yo)	2:37
6.	"Rap Check"	2:54
7.	"Dolla Fo' Dolla"	3:05
8.	"Ima Show You" (featuring Kodak Black)	2:29
9.	"Family Tree"	3:57
10.	"Shoot Off, Pt. 4"	2:18
11.	"No Competition" (featuring Blac Youngsta)	3:48

Side B
No.	Title	Length
12.	"Thinking Hours"	2:35
13.	"If I Ever Thought"	2:24
14.	"No Matter What"	3:07
15.	"Strapped in Calabasas"	2:37
16.	"Palm Trees in Memphis"	2:58
17.	"Just Left the Hamptons"	2:57
18.	"Forever Ballin'" (featuring Shenseea)	3:37
19.	"Crypto"	2:50
20.	"For the Record"	3:09
21.	"Last Run"	3:12
22.	"Free Game"	3:02

Bonus tracks
No.	Title	Length
23.	"Drop" (featuring DaBaby)	2:51
24.	"Recession Proof"	3:31
25.	"Stay Ur Distance"	2:47

== Charts ==
=== Weekly charts ===
Chart (2022)	Peak position
US Billboard 200	3
US Top R&B/Hip-Hop Albums (Billboard)	2

=== Year-end charts ===
Chart (2022)	Position
US Top R&B/Hip-Hop Albums (Billboard)	98
