= Scrilla =

American rapper (born 1983)

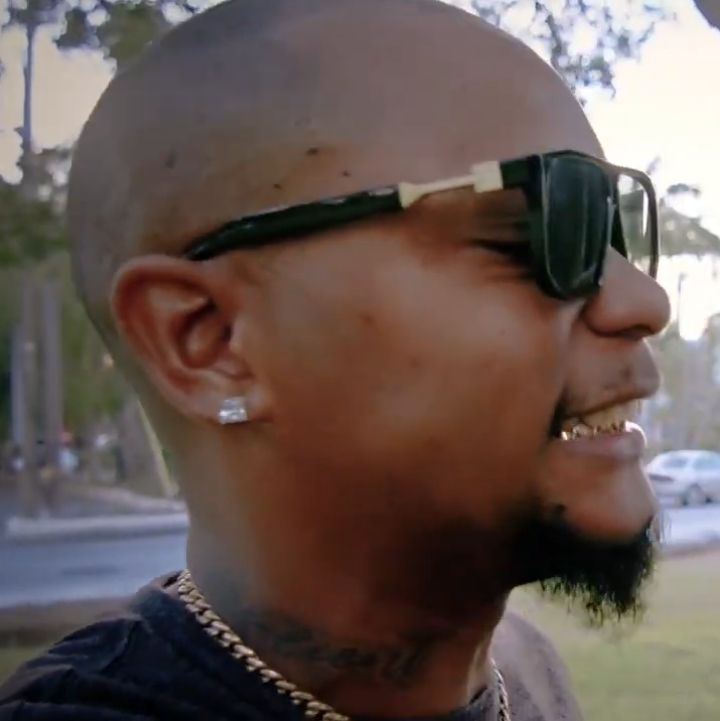
- Scrilla in 2023
- Born: André Scott; June 17, 1983 (age 43); Atlanta, Georgia, U.S.
- Other names: Young ACE Scrilla; Young Scrilla (Note: Sometimes stylized as "Young $crilla".); Scrillz
- Children: 1 (dead) (Note: It's unknown whether his son was adopted or not.)
- Musical career
- Genres: Hip-hop; freestyle rap; soca
- Occupations: Rapper; businessman
- Instrument: Vocals
- Years active: 2006–present
- Labels: Maybach Music Group; CTE World
- Website: scrillaworld.com — Archived

André "Scrilla" Scott (born June 17, 1983), (Note: Quoted in one source as having turned 21 ten times over throughout the last 10 years in 2017.) known professionally as Scrilla, is an American rapper, raised in Atlanta, Georgia. Scott has been active as a freestyle rapper since 2006, and was a member of the Atlanta-based entertainment group No Line Gang. He also was a member of Young Jeezy's label CTE World for most of 2012.

== Early life ==
André "Scrilla" Scott was born on June 17, 1983 and raised in Atlanta, Georgia. He grew up on Campbellton Road in Atlanta's zone 4. Scott started rapping at the age of 11, and in 2007, he won the BMI Unsigned Urban showcase. He went to prison from college and was set free on an unknown date. (Note: It's unknown what he got arrested for.) He moved to Liberia, a neighborhood of Miami, Hollywood, Florida, in about 2012 or 2013.

== Career ==
=== Early career ===
He started rapping in 9th grade, and started to take his rap career seriously in 2012.

=== Benhill Beast ===
In 2008, Scrilla released his debut mixtape Benhill Beast on the internet for free with direction from Franklin Family Entertainment, Don Music Group, and Nitti.

=== Smoke & Mirrors ===
On April 20, 2011, Scrilla released Smoke & Mirrors (hosted by Black Bill Gates) on the internet for free, which included the remix to I Ball, I Stunt, featuring CTE World founder Young Jeezy. Afterwards, Scrilla signed to CTE World on June 8, 2011.

=== The Demonstration ===
On June 19, 2012, Scrilla had his first and only full-length release with CTE World: The Demonstration (hosted by Bigga Rankin), which had production and feature collaborations with Southside, Killer Mike, Young Jeezy, Super Ced, Freddie Gibbs, and others. On December 31, 2012, Scrilla announced via Twitter that he was leaving CTE World in good terms: "... No hard feelings but It's time for me to do me."

=== God's Will ===
On 2013, Scrilla met Rick Ross through his manager Safe, and on April 24, 2017, Scrilla released his studio-made extended play (EP) with Maybach Music Group (MMG) titled God's will. He later signed to Rick Ross's Maybach Music Group label in about 2016 or 2017. (Note: Some sources suggest he signed to Tru Story Entertainment, while others suggest he signed to Maybach Music Group. It is unknown whether he is still signed to Tru Story Entertainment or left.) In addition, he created a single under the same name on the same release date as his album. The single's lyrics suggest he forgave his shooter due to his religious beliefs.

== Personal life ==
He grew up listening to 2Pac, Rick Ross, BG, Trick Daddy, Biggie, and Hov. In 2013, Scott was involved in shooting scenes for a rap music video. (Note: One source additionally adds that he performed at the King Of Diamonds strip club for Rick Ross's album God Forgives, I Don't.) As he was idling in a 750 BMW, there was a car behind him and opened fire. He was shot in the right leg by two AK-47 assault rifles and a handgun in a driveby at Overtown and was sent to the Jackson Memorial Hospital. LT, a co-founder of Tru Story Entertainment, picked him off the ground and saved his life during the shooting. He grieved the deaths of his father, brother, and son in 2017. (Note: Chronologically, his son died on April 24, 2017, and his brother died in the same month as his son. Additionally, his father's cause of death was flatlining in a hospital. It's unknown when his father died.)

== Discography ==
=== Studio albums ===
List of studio albums, with release date and label shown
| Title | Details |
|---|---|
| Hustlemania | Released: 2017; Label: Shawn Curry Sr.; Format: Digital download, streaming |
| Hustlemania, Vol. 2 | Released: 2018; Label: Self-released; Format: Digital download, streaming |
| Get Off My Dick | Released: 2019; Labels: Same Gang, IC Music; Format: Digital download, streaming |
| Outcast Riddim | Released: 2024; Label: Uprising Studios; Format: Digital download, streaming |
| Line Up Riddim | Released: 2025; Label: DJ Ky; Format: Digital download, streaming |

=== Mixtapes ===
List of mixtapes, with release date and label shown
| Title | Details |
|---|---|
| Scrilla World | Released: 2006; Label: Franklin Family Entertainment; Format: Digital download, streaming |
| Straight Based Ent., Vol. 1 | Released: 2009; Label: BMI; Format: Digital download, streaming |
| Benhill Beast | Released: 2008; Label: Don music group; Format: Digital download, streaming |
| Straight Based Ent., Vol. 1 | Released: 2009; Label: BMI; Format: Digital download, streaming |
| Smoke & Mirrors | Released: 2011; Labels: CTE World, Black Bill Gates; Format: Digital download, streaming |
| The Demonstration | Released: 2012; Labels: CTE World, Bigga Rankin; Format: Digital download, streaming |
| I Got The Juice (The Refill) | Released: June 16, 2013; Label: DJ Plugg; Format: Digital download, streaming |
| FM2U (From Me 2 U) (Note: Also written as "FAM2U".) | Released: November 28, 2017; Labels: Maybach Music Group, Nico Music LLC; Format: Digital download, streaming |
| Against Da Grain | Released: 2021; Labels: Suavehouse Shareholders Ink., Bigga Rankin; Format: Digital download, streaming |

=== EPs ===
List of extended plays, with release date and label shown
| Title | Details |
|---|---|
| God's Will | Released: April 24, 2017; Label: Same Gang; Format: Digital download, streaming |

=== Singles ===
==== As lead artist ====
List of singles as lead artist, showing year released and album title
| Title | Year | Album |
|---|---|---|
| "Ric Flair" | 2016 | Non-album singles |
| "Fork in the Pot" | 2016 | Non-album singles |
| "Gyal Drop" | 2016 | Non-album singles |
| "God's Will" (featuring Rick Ross) | 2017 | God's Will |
| "God's Playground" | 2017 | God's Will |
| "Weakness" | 2020 | Non-album singles |
| "Take Your Time" | 2020 | Non-album singles |
| "You" (with DJ Spider) | 2023 | Non-album singles |
| "Drink Out de Fete" | 2023 | Non-album singles |
| "Back ah You" | 2024 | Non-album singles |
| "Tha Wa Ya Like (Dunce Riddim)" (with Dutty Tallics) | 2025 | Non-album singles |
| "Bubble Up" (with Nelieux) | 2026 | Non-album singles |
| "Come" (with DJ Spider) | 2026 | Non-album singles |

==== As featured artist ====
List of singles as featured artist, showing year released and album title
| Title | Year | Album |
|---|---|---|
| "Child of the Ghetto" (Monster featuring Juan Gotti and Scrilla) | 2000 | The Purity Album |
| "I Ball, I Stunt" (Young Jeezy featuring Scrilla) | 2011 | The Real Is Back |
| "Sittin' Low" (Young Jeezy featuring Freddie Gibbs and Scrilla) | 2011 | Gangsta Grillz: The Real Is Back 2 |
| "Drop de Bumpa" | 2015 | Soca Eruption |
| "Somebody Sexy" | 2016 | Soca Eruption |
| "Supa Cindy" (Supa Cindy with Rick Ross, Sam Sneak, and Scrilla) | 2016 | Non-album single |
| "Triple Platinum" (Rick Ross featuring Scrilla) | 2017 | Rather You Than Me |
| "Wood" (DJ Spider featuring Scrilla) | 2017 | Whistle & Drum Riddim |
| "Skys da Limit" (Man O.G. with Scrilla) | 2017 | Non-album single |
| "I Want" (Kash Doll featuring Scrilla) | 2018 | Brat Mail |
| "Bumpa Control" | 2018 | Dubai Riddim |
| "Intoxication" | 2019 | Velocity Riddim |
| "Ahora mismo" (Rook Director featuring Scrilla) | 2020 | Non-album single |
| "Tings" (Shockwave Productions featuring Scrilla) | 2023 | Duck Pond Riddim |

== Awards and nominations ==
=== Disney Music Awards ===
| Year | Category | Nominated work | Result | Ref. |
|---|---|---|---|---|
| 2023 | Disney Music Awards | Song placements (for Moon Girl and Devil Dinosaur) | Nominated | |
