= 5 Star (song) =

2009 single by Yo Gotti

Single by Yo Gotti

from the album Cocaine Muzik 3
- Released: May 20, 2009
- Recorded: 2009
- Genre: Hip hop
- Length: 3:44
- Label: Polo Grounds Music; Inevitable Entertainment; J Records
- Songwriters: Mario Mims; Rodney Tate
- Producer: Hot Rod

Yo Gotti singles chronology
"Ridiculous" (2009)	"5 Star" (2009)	"Women Lie, Men Lie" (2009)

"5 Star" is a song by Yo Gotti. Hot Rod produced the single, which was released on May 20, 2009. The music video, released in August 2009, includes a cameo appearance by Rick Ross.

== Promotion ==
The song benefitted from heavy promotion on MTV, MTV2 and BET and a lot of airplay. It entered the Billboard Hot 100 the week of November 17 at number 79.

== Music video ==
The music video was shot in Los Angeles and premiered on 106 & Park two months prior to the remix video. The remix video premiered on 106 & Park on October 9, 2009, later peaking at number one and ranking at number 25 on BET's Notarized Top 100 Videos of 2009 countdown.

"5 Star Remix"

Promotional single by Yo Gotti featuring Gucci Mane, Trina and Nicki Minaj

from the album Live from the Kitchen
- Released: November 9, 2009
- Recorded: 2009
- Genre: Hip hop
- Length: 4:07
- Label: Polo Grounds Music; Inevitable Entertainment; J Records
- Songwriters: Mario Mims; Rodney Tate
- Producer: Hot Rod

== Remixes ==
The official remix has two versions, both versions have a new verse by Yo Gotti and verses by rappers Gucci Mane & Trina. The original remix, has a verse by Lil Boosie but Because of Lil' Boosie's impending four-year prison sentence, he was unable to attend the video shoot, so a second version was needed for the video. That version, now the main official remix, has a verse by Young Money artist Nicki Minaj replacing Boosie's verse. The explicit version of the remix with Nicki Minaj was released as a digital single on November 9, 2009.

The third remix featuring Gucci Mane, Diamond, Trina, and Nicki Minaj.

== Charts ==
=== Weekly charts ===
Chart (2009)	Peak position
US Billboard Hot 100	79
US Hot R&B/Hip-Hop Songs (Billboard)	19
US Hot Rap Songs (Billboard)	11

=== Year-end charts ===
Chart (2009)	Position
US Hot R&B/Hip-Hop Songs (Billboard)	75
US Rap Songs (Billboard)	37

== Certifications ==
Region	Certification	Certified units/sales
United States (RIAA)	Gold	500,000^{‡}
^{‡} Sales+streaming figures based on certification alone.
