= Down in the DM =

Single by Yo Gotti featuring Nicki Minaj

from the album The Art of Hustle
- Released: October 27, 2015
- Recorded: 2015
- Genre: Trap
- Length: 3:01
- Label: Epic; CMG
- Songwriters: Mario Mims; Khaled Khaled; Onika Maraj (Remix only); Benjamin Diehl; Ian Lewis
- Producers: Ben Billions; Schife

Yo Gotti singles chronology
| "Rihanna" (2015) | "Down in the DM" (2015) | "Order More" (2016) |

Nicki Minaj singles chronology
| "Back Together" (2015) | "Down in the DM" (2015) | "No Broken Hearts" (2016) |

"Down in the DM" is a song by American rapper Yo Gotti. Released on October 27, 2015, as the lead single from his fifth studio album, The Art of Hustle (2016), it was produced by Ben Billions and Schife. The song was officially credited as featuring Nicki Minaj on US charts due to her remix version. The song peaked at number 13 on the US Billboard Hot 100, making it Yo Gotti's first top 40 entry.

== Critical reception ==
Rolling Stone named the remix of "Down in the DM" one of the 30 best songs of the first half of 2016: "On paper, a 34-year-old Southern rap lifer talking about his social media game should be embarrassing, but Yo Gotti has the right amount of bounce, humor and R-rated come-ons. Meanwhile, Nicki Minaj shows up to point out who's really in charge."

== Chart performance ==
Down in the DM debuted at number 87 on the US Billboard Hot 100 for the chart dated December 19, 2015. Following the release of the Nicki Minaj-assisted remix, the song climbed from number 31 to a new peak at number 18 on the chart, eventually topping out at number 13 in March 2016. The Hot 100 lift came largely thanks to a 154% increase in weekly sales. The song shifted 51,349 paid US downloads during the February 5–11 tracking period and ranked as that week’s number 12 digital song. The arrival of the remix additionally soared streams for the song by 59% to 7.2 million, with Spotify leading with 38% of overall plays across streaming providers. On May 29, 2020, the single was certified triple platinum by the Recording Industry Association of America (RIAA) for combined sales and streaming units of over three million units in the United States.

== Music video ==
The song's accompanying music video premiered on February 4, 2016, via Yo Gotti's Vevo channel. The video features cameo appearances by CeeLo Green, Machine Gun Kelly, YG, Rae Sremmurd and DJ Khaled. Rap-Up ranked it at number 20 on their list of 20 Best Music Videos of 2016.

== Remixes ==
On February 4, 2016, the official remix of the song, featuring vocals from American rapper Nicki Minaj, was released. "Down in the DM" has been also unofficially remixed several times by various artists, including Rick Ross, K. Michelle and Chrisette Michele.

== Charts ==
=== Weekly charts ===
| Chart (2015–16) | Peak position |
|---|---|
| Canada Hot 100 (Billboard) | 59 |
| US Billboard Hot 100 | 13 |
| US Hot R&B/Hip-Hop Songs (Billboard) | 3 |
| US Rhythmic Airplay (Billboard) | 4 |

=== Year-end charts ===
| Chart (2016) | Position |
|---|---|
| US Billboard Hot 100 | 69 |
| US Hot R&B/Hip-Hop Songs (Billboard) | 21 |
| US Rhythmic (Billboard) | 39 |

== Certifications ==
| Region | Certification | Certified units/sales |
|---|---|---|
| New Zealand (RMNZ) | Platinum | 30,000^{‡} |
| United States (RIAA) | 4× Platinum | 4,000,000^{‡} |
^{‡} Sales+streaming figures based on certification alone.
