= I Am (Yo Gotti album) =

Studio album by Yo Gotti
- Released: November 19, 2013
- Recorded: 2012–13
- Genre: Hip hop
- Length: 49:28
- Labels: CMG; Epic
- Producers: Benny Pough (exec.); Sha Money XL (exec.); Yo Gotti (exec.); Arthur McArthur; Cool & Dre; Drumma Boy; David Versis; Honorable C.N.O.T.E.; Canei Finch; Greedy Money; Infamous; Jesse Wilson; Metro Boomin; Phatboiz; P-Lo; Lee On The Beats; Mike Will Made It; Sonny Digital; Trauma Tone; The Youngstars

Yo Gotti chronology
Live from the Kitchen (2012)	I Am (2013)	The Art of Hustle (2016)

Singles from I Am
- 1. "Act Right" Released: July 23, 2013; 2. "King Shit" Released: October 7, 2013; 3. "Cold Blood" Released: October 31, 2013; 4. "I Know" Released: November 15, 2013

I Am is the seventh studio album by American hip hop recording artist Yo Gotti. The album was released on November 19, 2013, by Epic and CMG. The album features guest appearances from T.I., Ne-Yo, Wale, Rich Homie Quan, J. Cole, Jeezy, Meek Mill, and YG, among others. The album was supported by the singles "Act Right" featuring YG and Jeezy, "King Shit" featuring T.I., "Cold Blood" featuring J. Cole and Canei Finch and "I Know" featuring Rich Homie Quan. The first and fourth singles were later certified gold by the RIAA.

== Background ==
On May 28, 2013, Yo Gotti announced that his sixth studio album would be titled I Am. In July 2013, it was announced that the album would be released on November 19, 2013. On August 22, 2013, he announced the I Am Tour Dates, a tour in promotion of I Am which ran from September 14, 2013, until November 19, 2013, with supporting acts including YG, Zed Zilla, Shy Glizzy and Cash Out. On September 2, 2013, Yo Gotti released the mixtape Nov 19th: The Mixtape in promotion for the album.

In a December 2013, interview with Mikey T The Movie Star, Yo Gotti spoke about how the album was received, saying: "We gettin' nothin' but good, positive feedback from the album. The numbers going fairly well. Most important to me, the fans loved it. Fans fuck wit' it. ...Just givin' the people what they want. I've seen a lot of growth with this album. We doing different platforms, TV shows, we doing shows in different markets. Just being on different blog sites. I'm seeing a lot of different things coming. I guess it's because of the growth of the material that I put out on this album."

== Singles ==
On July 23, 2013, the album's first single "Act Right" featuring Jeezy and YG was released. On July 24, 2013, the music video for "Act Right" featuring Jeezy and YG was released. "Act Right" has since peaked at number 100 on the US Billboard Hot 100. On October 7, 2013, the album's second official single "King Shit" featuring T.I. was released to mainstream urban radio in the United States. On October 15, 2013, the music video for "King Shit" featuring T.I. was released. "King Shit" has since peaked at five on the US Billboard Bubbling Under R&B/Hip-Hop Singles chart.

On October 27, 2013, Yo Gotti premiered the album's third single, "Cold Blood" featuring rapper J. Cole and Canei Finch. Four days later on October 31, "Cold Blood" was serviced to mainstream urban radio in the United States. Then on November 19, 2013, "Cold Blood" was serviced to rhythmic contemporary radio in the United States. On February 5, 2014, the music video was released for "Cold Blood" featuring J. Cole and Canei Finch.

On November 20, 2013, the music video was released for "LeBron James". On December 10, 2013, the music video was released for "Don't Come Around" featuring Kendall Morgan. On November 15, 2013, "I Know" featuring Rich Homie Quan was released as the album's fourth single. In January 2014, it was serviced to urban contemporary radio in the United States. On May 1, 2014, the music video was released for "I Know" featuring Rich Homie Quan.

== Critical reception ==
Professional ratings
Aggregate scores
Source	Rating
Metacritic	64/100
Review scores
Source	Rating
AllMusic	4/5 stars
The Daily Cougar	3/5 stars
HipHopDX	2.5/5 stars
Memphis Flyer	(positive)
RapReviews	4.5/10
Vibe	(positive)
USA Today	2/4 stars
XXL	3/5 (L)

I Am was met with generally positive reviews from music critics. At Metacritic, which assigns a normalized rating out of 100 to reviews from mainstream critics, the album received an average score of 64, based on 5 reviews. David Jeffries of AllMusic gave the album four out of five stars, saying "Good news for fans who stuck it out this long is that I Am is the moment when the skies clear, as the album comes on strong with a hard-hitting set of openers, and then, the high quality is maintained with a set of easy-flowing supportive songs that broaden the LP spectrum, all without leaving Gotti's comfort zone." Ronald Grant of HipHopDX gave the album two and a half stars out of five, saying "At the end of the day, I Am’s overall passable production and flashes of potency and strength keep it afloat for a time. And Gotti deserves commendation for his talent at bringing an explicit rawness, reality and affection to his autobiographical bars. But even those considerations aren’t enough to make this album worth more than a few listens, sadly relying on a continuous set of monotonous hooks and overly used trap beats that saturate a strong majority of current popular Rap music." Reed Jackson of XXL gave the album an L, saying "On the majority of I Am, he stays rooted in the ideas and melodies that he’s been refining since he first dropped From Da Dope Game 2 Da Rap Game over 10 year ago. The self-proclaimed “King Of Memphis” has lived up to his title again, and perhaps this album will help him continue his reign for another 10 years."

Paul Cantor of Vibe gave the album a positive review, saying "If there’s one glaring downside to I Am, it’s that a handful of songs sound, well, a lot like other songs. [...] One on the one hand you applaud Gotti for implementing a hit-making formula so effectively, and after all, songs sounding like other songs is not an uncommon thing. But on the other hand, why couldn't Gotti couldn't come up with his own blueprint for smash records? Maybe after all these years he didn't want to leave too much up to chance. Not sure we can be mad at that." Grant Jones of RapReviews gave the album a 4.5 out of 10, saying "If you can get past the ignorance, this is enjoyable for what it is - an album to be played loudly in your car, with the windows down and a middle finger up to anybody who looks at you disapprovingly." Louis Goggans of the Memphis Flyer gave the album a positive review, saying "Gotti’s transition from dominating the underground rap circuit to enjoying mainstream success with hits like “5 Star” and “Men Lie, Women Lie” convey that hard work pays off. And he continues to utilize the very same work ethic that's brought him to this point in his career on his latest project. Although Gotti doesn't sway too far from his usual topics on the album, he doesn't display any signs of decline creatively either. After more than 10 years in the game, Gotti still has the ability to provide listeners with quality music and this is evident with I Am."

=== Awards and nominations ===
Year	Ceremony	Category	Result
2014	2014 BET Hip Hop Awards	Album of the Year	Nominated

== Commercial performance ==
I Am debuted at number seven on the US Billboard 200 chart, selling 48,000 copies in its first week, becoming Yo Gotti's first US top ten debut. In its second week, the album dropped to number 45 on the chart, selling an additional 19,000 copies. In its third week, the album dropped to number 56, selling 11,000 more copies. In its fourth week, the album dropped to number 76 on chart, selling 10,000 more copies. As of August 2015, the album has sold 212,000 copies in the United States. On December 7, 2018, the album was certified gold by the Recording Industry Association of America (RIAA) for combined sales and album-equivalent units of over 500,000 units in the United States.

== Track listing ==
No.	Title	Writer(s)	Producer(s)	Length
1.	"I Am"	Mario Mims; Philipp Hurtt; Fancy; Walter Sigler; Kazumi Tabarak	Cool & Dre	3:04
2.	"Don't Come Around" (featuring Kendall Morgan)	Mims; Kendall Morgan; Alexander Izquierdo	Infamous; Alexander Izquierdo	3:10
3.	"I Know" (featuring Rich Homie Quan)	Mims; Denzel Foster; Jay King; Dequantes Lamar; Thomas McElroy	Trauma Tone; Rich Homie Quan	4:19
4.	"Sorry"	Mims; La'Troy Garrett	Greedy Money	3:16
5.	"F-U" (featuring Meek Mill)	Mims; Robert Williams; Millie Jackson; Randy Klein	Infamous	3:05
6.	"Pride To the Side"	Mims; Robert Daniels; Matt Brox; Everett Orr	The Youngstars	4:21
7.	"Cold Blood" (featuring J. Cole & Canei Finch)	Mims; Jermaine Cole; Dale Warren; Canei Finch	Canei Finch	5:11
8.	"LeBron James"	Mims; Anthony Norris	Lee On The Beats	3:13
9.	"Die a Real Nigga"	Mims; Carlton Mays Jr.	Honorable C.N.O.T.E.	4:29
10.	"King Shit" (featuring T.I.)	Mims; Clifford Harris; Asha Bhosle; Mahenra Kakpoor	David Versis; Arthur McArthur	3:31
11.	"Respect That You Earn" (featuring Ne-Yo & Wale)	Mims; Olubowale Akintimehin; Shaffer Smith	Jesse "Corparal" Wilson; Phatboiz; Kenton Dunson	4:22
12.	"ION Want It"	Mims; Leland Wayne	Metro Boomin	3:17
13.	"Act Right" (featuring Jeezy & YG)	Mims; Keenon Jackson; Jay Jenkins; Paulo Ytienza Rodriguez; Osten Harvey Jr.; Roger Troutman; Christopher Wallace; Sudan Williams	P-Lo	4:10

== Charts ==
=== Weekly charts ===
Chart (2013–14)	Peak position
US Billboard 200	7
US Top R&B/Hip-Hop Albums (Billboard)	2

=== Year-end charts ===
Chart (2014)	Position
US Billboard 200	116
US Top R&B/Hip-Hop Albums (Billboard)	22

== Certifications ==
Region	Certification	Certified units/sales
United States (RIAA)	Gold	500,000^{‡}
^{‡} Sales+streaming figures based on certification alone.
