= Yo Gotti =

American rapper (born 1981)

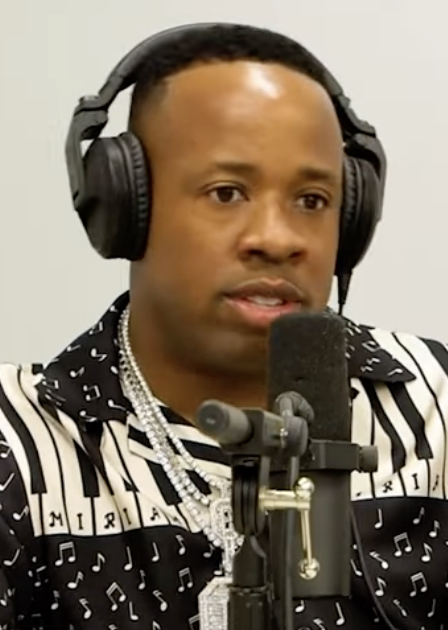
- Yo Gotti in 2022

Background information
- Also known as: Lil Yo; Big Gotti
- Born: Mario Mims; May 19, 1981 (age 45); Memphis, Tennessee, U.S.
- Genre: Southern hip-hop
- Occupations: Rapper; songwriter; record executive; record producer
- Works: Yo Gotti discography
- Years active: 1996–present
- Labels: Interscope; Collective; Inevitable II; Roc Nation; Epic; RCA; Polo Grounds; J; TVT; Inevitable
- Website: officialyogotti.com

Logo

Mario Mims (born May 19, 1981), known professionally as Yo Gotti, is an American rapper, record executive, and record producer. Rooted in Memphis rap, he released five independent albums—Youngsta's on a Come Up (1996), From da Dope Game 2 da Rap Game (2000), Self-Explanatory (2001), Life (2003), and Back 2 da Basics (2006)—before signing with J Records in 2009. Two of his singles that year, "5 Star" and "Women Lie, Men Lie" (featuring Lil Wayne), received gold certifications by the Recording Industry Association of America (RIAA) and entered the Billboard Hot 100. Both songs were omitted from his sixth album and major label debut, Live from the Kitchen (2012), which, despite mixed critical reception, peaked at number 12 on the Billboard 200.

He transferred to Epic Records for the release his sixth and seventh albums, I Am (2013) and The Art of Hustle (2016); both peaked within the Billboard 200's top ten, and spawned the platinum-certified singles "Act Right" (featuring Jeezy and YG), "I Know" (featuring Rich Homie Quan), "Down in the DM" and "Law" (featuring E-40). His 2017 single, "Rake It Up" (with Mike Will Made-It featuring Nicki Minaj), peaked at number eight on the Billboard Hot 100 and remains his highest entry on the chart; it preceded his eighth album, I Still Am (2017). His ninth and tenth albums, Untrapped (2020), and CM10: Free Game (2022), peaked at numbers ten and three on the Billboard 200, respectively; the former served as his final release with Epic.

Gotti founded the record label Collective Music Group (CMG) in 2012, which has gone on to sign successful acts including Moneybagg Yo, 42 Dugg, Blac Youngsta, GloRilla, EST Gee, and Mozzy.

== Career ==
=== 2000–2006: Career beginnings ===
Gotti grew up in Ridgecrest Apartments in the Frayser neighborhood of Memphis, Tennessee. He began his music career around the age of 14, rapping as Lil Yo, affiliated with DJ Sound and his crew. Between 2000 and 2006, Yo Gotti released a string of independent albums: From da Dope Game 2 da Rap Game (2000), Self-Explanatory (2001), Life (2003), and Back 2 da Basics (2006).

=== 2009–2012: Live from the Kitchen ===
Yo Gotti released his major label debut studio album Live from the Kitchen in January 2012, after several delays. "5 Star", the album's original first single, was released in May 2009. The single peaked at 79 on the Hot 100, 19 on U.S R&B and 11 on U.S Rap. "Women Lie, Men Lie" featuring Lil Wayne, the album's second single, was released in December 2009. The song peaked at 81 on 100, 22 on the U.S R&B and 12 on the U.S Rap.

"Look In the Mirror" was the third single released seven months after the second single in July 2010. The song peaked at 97 on the U.S R&B chart. Live from the Kitchen debuted at number 12 on the US Billboard 200, with 16,000 copies sold in its first week of sales in the United States. After three weeks on the chart, the album had sold 36,000 copies in the United States. In 2012, due to Gotti's views following the low sales of his debut album, he left RCA Records and Polo Grounds Music. He released the 7th version of his well-known mixtape series Cocaine Muzik, titled Cocaine Muzik 7: The World Is Yours, in October 2012.

=== 2013–present: I Am, The Art of Hustle, Untrapped and CM10: Free Game ===
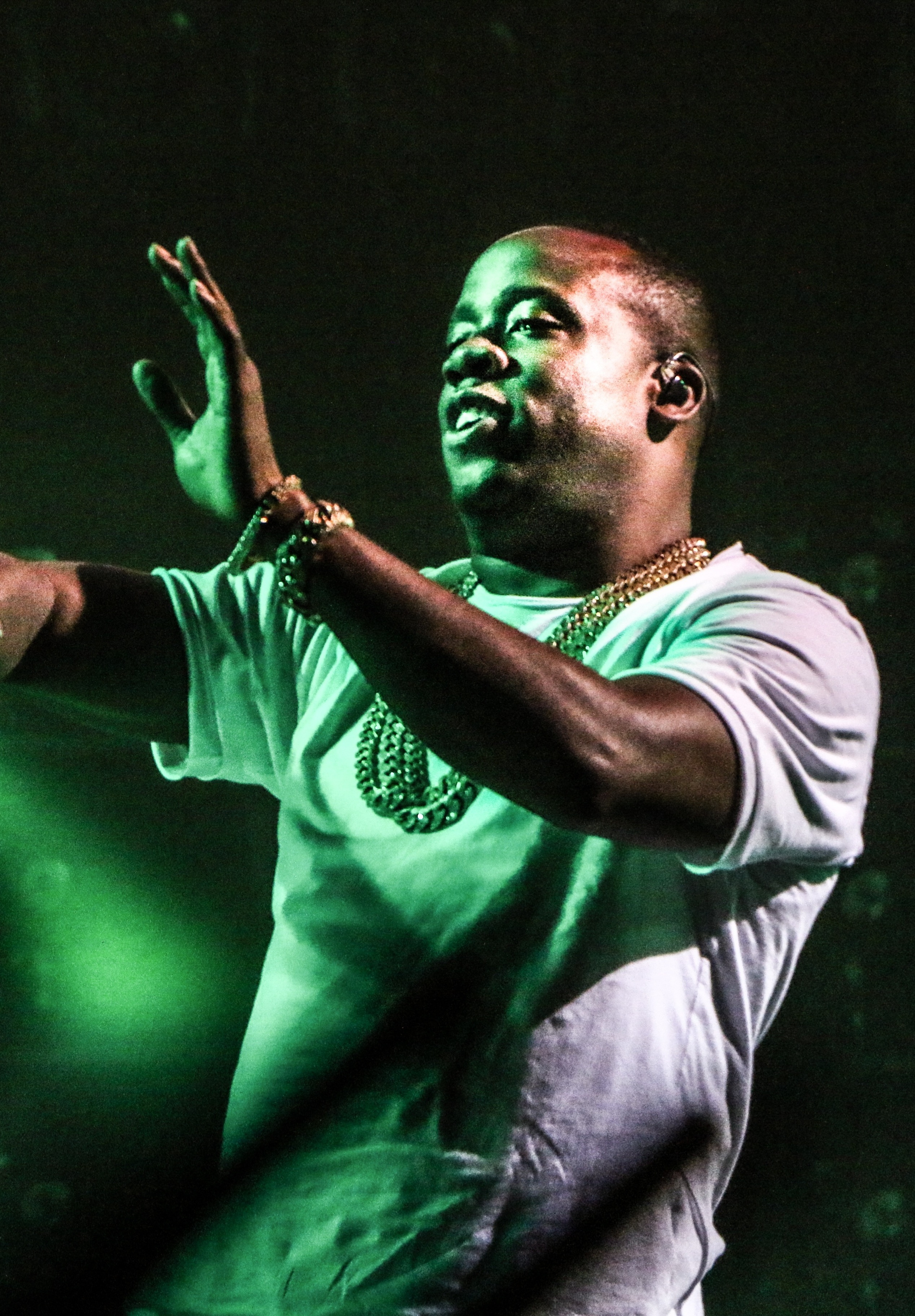
Yo Gotti performing in 2013

In early 2013, Gotti announced that he and his label CMG had been signed to a distribution deal with Epic Records from longtime business partner L.A. Reid. In May 2013, Yo Gotti announced that his sixth studio album would be titled I Am. The first single from his sixth studio album I Am is titled "Act Right" and features Young Jeezy and YG. The song debuted at #5 on the Bubbling Under Hot 100 Singles chart and at #39 on the Hot R&B/Hip-Hop Songs chart. As of September 21, it has peaked at #100 on the Hot 100, making it Gotti and YG's third Hot 100 entry, #33 on Hot R&B/Hip-Hop Songs chart and at #24 on the Rap Songs chart.

In July 2013, it was announced that the album would be released on November 19, 2013. In August 2013, he announced the I Am Tour Dates, a tour in promotion of I Am which ran from September 14 until November 19, 2013, with supporting acts including YG, Zed Zilla, Shy Glizzy and Cash Out. In September 2013, Yo Gotti released the mixtape Nov 19: The Mixtape in promotion for the album.

On October 7, 2013, the album's second official single "King Shit" featuring T.I. was sent to mainstream urban radio in the United States. On October 15, the music video for "King Shit" featuring T.I. was released. "King Shit" peaked at five on the US Billboard Bubbling Under R&B/Hip-Hop Singles chart. On October 27, 2013, Yo Gotti premiered the album's third single, "Cold Blood" featuring rapper J. Cole and Canei Finch.

In February 2016, Yo Gotti released the official cover art for both the standard and deluxe versions of The Art of Hustle, and the release date of the album. Released on February 19, 2016, the album peaked at number 4 on the Billboard 200. The album's lead single "Down in the DM", featuring Nicki Minaj on the remix, peaked at number 13 on the Billboard Hot 100. In August 2016, singer Meghan Trainor released "Better" featuring Gotti, as the third single from her second major-label album, Thank You. Gotti closed out 2016 with the announcement of a deal with Jay-Z and his Roc Nation label, in partnership with his own CMG (Collective Music Group) imprint.

In June 2017, Gotti released a collaborative mixtape with record producer Mike Will Made It, titled Gotti Made-It. The mixtape's lead single, "Rake It Up" featuring Nicki Minaj, peaked at number 8 on the Billboard Hot 100 and became his highest charting single in the country. "Rake It Up" was later included on his ninth album I Still Am (2017). Gotti's tenth album, Untrapped, was released in January 2020 and became his fourth consecutive top-ten debut on the Billboard 200. The album features Megan Thee Stallion, Lil Uzi Vert, Rick Ross, Ty Dolla Sign, and Moneybagg Yo, among others. It was Gotti's fourth and final album under the initial Epic Records contract.

In July 2020, he released the single, "Recession Proof", on his label CMG, with Epic, under a new contract. Sophie Caraan of Hypebeast said on the song, "He celebrates his longevity in the music industry, his growth as a businessman and rise as a music exec, boasting his label's lineup that includes the likes of 42 Dugg, Blac Youngsta and Lil Migo, and his management work with Moneybagg Yo and Blocboy JB". In September 2021, Yo Gotti announced that he had become co-owner of the Major League Soccer franchise D.C. United. He explained that he saw its growth over the years after being introduced to the game by his son.

Gotti's eleventh studio album, CM10: Free Game, was set for release in November 2021, until the album was delayed for unknown reasons. It was eventually released in February 2022. It is a double-disc album, consisting of the discs: "Free" and "Game".

== Personal life ==
=== Shooting incidents ===
Gotti was widely accused of having ordered a hit on rapper Adolph Robert "Young Dolph" Thornton Jr., following a feud over Thornton's proclamation of himself as the "King of Memphis" in 2016. Thornton was murdered in November 2021, with several of Gotti's associates arrested and charged in relation with the incident, including his brother Anthony "Big Jook" Mims. Though he was never charged for Thornton's murder prior to his death, Big Jook was suspected of ordering the fatal hit on Thornton.

On March 29, 2023, a shooting in Memphis, Tennessee occurred at Gotti's Privé Restaurant. On January 13, 2024, Big Jook was fatally shot in Memphis.

== Discography ==
Studio albums

- Youngsta's on a Come Up (as Lil Yo, 1996)
- From da Dope Game 2 da Rap Game (2000)
- Self-Explanatory (2001)
- Life (2003)
- Back 2 da Basics (2006)
- Live from the Kitchen (2012)
- I Am (2013)
- The Art of Hustle (2016)
- I Still Am (2017)
- Untrapped (2020)
- CM10: Free Game (2022)

EP

- The Return of Cocaine Muzik EP
- The Return of Cocaine Muzik Pt. 2 EP

== Awards and nominations ==
=== BET Hip Hop Awards ===
Year	Category	Nominated work	Result
2014	Album of the Year	I Am	Nominated
2017	Best Collabo, Duo or Group	"Rake It Up" (with Nicki Minaj)	Nominated
2017	Best Mixtape	Gotti Made-It (with Mike Will Made It)	Nominated

=== Soul Train Music Awards ===
Year	Category	Nominated work	Result
2017	Rhythm & Bars Award	"Rake It Up" (with Nicki Minaj)	Nominated
