= Lyfe Jennings discography =

This article contains the discography of American R&B and soul singer Lyfe Jennings.

== Albums ==
=== Studio albums ===
| Year | Title | Chart positions | | Certifications |
| Year | Title | U.S. 200 | U.S. R&B | Certifications |
|---|---|---|---|---|
| 2004 | Lyfe 268-192: Released: August 17, 2004; Label: Sony Urban Music/Columbia | 39 | 7 | |
| 2006 | The Phoenix: Released: August 15, 2006; Label: Sony Urban Music/Columbia | 2 | 1 | RIAA: Gold |
| 2008 | Lyfe Change: Released: April 29, 2008; Label: Sony Urban Music/Columbia | 4 | 1 | |
| 2010 | I Still Believe: Released: August 31, 2010; Label: Jesus Swings/Asylum/Warner Bros. | 6 | 3 | |
| 2013 | Lucid: Released: October 8, 2013; Label: Mass Appeal Entertainment | 32 | 8 | |
| 2015 | Tree of Lyfe: Released: June 22, 2015; Label: Mass Appeal Entertainment | 117 | 9 | |
| 2019 | 777: Released: August 23, 2019; Label: LJ Music/RBC Records | — | — | |

=== Compilation albums ===
| Year | Title | Chart positions |
| Year | Title | U.S. R&B |
|---|---|---|
| 2009 | Playlist: The Very Best of Lyfe Jennings: Released: September 15, 2009; Label: Sony Urban Music/Columbia/Legacy | 85 |

== Singles ==
=== Solo singles ===
| Year | Song | U.S. Hot 100 | U.S. R&B | U.S. Hot Adult Cont. | Album |
|---|---|---|---|---|---|
| 2004 | "Stick Up Kid" | — | — | — | Lyfe 268-192 |
| 2004 | "Must Be Nice" | 40 | 5 | 6 | Lyfe 268-192 |
| 2005 | "Hypothetically" (featuring Fantasia) | — | 38 | 18 | Lyfe 268-192 |
| 2006 | "S.E.X." (featuring LaLa Brown) | 37 | 3 | 1 | The Phoenix |
| 2006 | "Let's Stay Together" | — | 32 | 27 | The Phoenix |
| 2007 | "Cops Up" | — | 68 | — | Lyfe Change |
| 2008 | "Never Never Land" | 102 | 18 | 6 | Lyfe Change |
| 2008 | "Will I Ever" | — | 55 | — | Lyfe Change |
| 2009 | "Haters" | — | 71 | — | non-album single |
| 2010 | "Busy" | — | 39 | — | I Still Believe |
| 2010 | "Statistics" | — | 19 | — | I Still Believe |
| 2010 | "It Coulda Been Worse" | — | 100 | — | I Still Believe |
| 2015 | "Pretty Is" | — | — | — | Tree of Lyfe |
| 2015 | "I Love You" | — | — | — | Tree of Lyfe |
| 2019 | "Accusing Me" | — | — | — | 777 |
| 2019 | "New Chick" (featuring Bobby V & Boosie) | — | — | — | 777 |

=== Featured singles ===
| Year | Song | U.S. Hot 100 | U.S. R&B | Album |
|---|---|---|---|---|
| 2006 | "Freeze" (LL Cool J featuring Lyfe Jennings) | — | 65 | Todd Smith |
| 2007 | "Ghetto Mindstate (Can't Get Away)" (Lil Flip featuring Lyfe Jennings) | — | 77 | I Need Mine |

== Guest appearances ==
| Year | Title | Chart positions | | | Album |
| Year | Title | U.S. Hot 100 | U.S. R&B | U.S. Rap | Album |
|---|---|---|---|---|---|
| 2005 | "Cold Outside" (Jin featuring Lyfe) | - | - | - | The Rest Is History |
| 2005 | "Freeze" (LL Cool J featuring Lyfe) | - | #65 | - | Todd Smith |
| 2006 | "It's My Time" (Rick Ross featuring Lyfe) | - | - | - | Port of Miami |
| 2007 | "Buck The World" (Young Buck featuring Lyfe) | - | - | - | Buck the World |
| 2008 | "Tryin' to Get Home" (Blood Raw featuring Lyfe Jennings) | - | - | - | My Life: The True Testimony |
