= Bussy =

Bussy may refer to:

== People ==
- Bussy (surname), a surname (including a list of people with the name)
- Bussy Mansell (1623–1699), Welsh politician
- Bussy Mansel, 4th Baron Mansel (died 1750), Welsh peer
- Charles Joseph Patissier, Marquis de Bussy-Castelnau (1718–1785), French colonial governor
- N. Anand, Indian politician commonly known as Bussy Anand

== Places ==
=== France ===
- Bussy, Cher, a commune in the Cher département
- Bussy, Oise, a commune in the Oise département
- Bussy-Albieux, a commune in the Loire département
- Bussy-en-Othe, a commune in the Yonne département
- Bussy-la-Pesle, Côte-d'Or, a commune in the Côte-d'Or département
- Bussy-la-Pesle, Nièvre, a commune in the Nièvre département
- Bussy-le-Château, a commune in the Marne département
- Bussy-le-Grand, a commune in the Côte-d'Or département
- Bussy-le-Repos, Marne, a commune in the Marne département
- Bussy-le-Repos, Yonne, a commune in the Yonne département
- Bussy-lès-Daours, a commune in the Somme département
- Bussy-lès-Poix, a commune in the Somme département
- Bussy-Lettrée, a commune in the Marne département
- Bussy-Saint-Martin, a commune in the Seine-et-Marne département
- Gigny-Bussy, a commune in the Marne département
- Saint-Remy-sur-Bussy, a commune in the Marne département
- Bussy-Saint-Georges, a commune in the Seine-et-Marne département

=== Switzerland ===
- Bussy, Fribourg, a commune in the canton of Fribourg
- Bussy-Chardonney, a commune in the canton of Vaud
- Bussy-sur-Morges, a village and former municipality in the canton of Vaud
- Bussy-sur-Moudon, a commune in the canton of Vaud

== Other ==
- Bussy D'Ambois, a Jacobean play by George Chapman, opened in London in 1603
- Bussy (word), a portmanteau of "boy" and "-ussy" used to denote the male anus

== See also ==
- Busy (disambiguation)
