= Bussy-le-Repos =

Bussy-le-Repos is the name of the following communes in France:

- Bussy-le-Repos, Marne, in the Marne department
- Bussy-le-Repos, Yonne, in the Yonne department

== See also ==
- Bussy (disambiguation)
