= Busy =

Busy may refer to:

== Places ==
- Busy, Doubs, a commune in France
- Busy, Kentucky

== People ==
- Everett M. "Busy" Arnold (1899–1974), American comic books entrepreneur
- Busy Bee Starski (born 1962), American rapper
- Busy P, the stage name of the French DJ Pedro Winter
- Busy Philipps (born 1979), American film actress

== Arts, entertainment, and media ==
=== Fictional characters ===
- Little Miss Busy, a Little Miss character
- Mr. Busy, a character in the Mr. Men series and the titular character of the book Mr. Busy

=== Music ===
- "Busy" (Lyfe Jennings song), 2010
- "Busy" (Olly Murs song), 2011
- "Busy", a 1998 song by Grinspoon
- "Busy", a song by Jawbreaker
- "Busy", a 2000 song by K's Choice

== See also ==
- Business
- Busy signal (disambiguation)
- Bussy (disambiguation)
