= Let's Stay Together (Lyfe Jennings song) =

Single by Lyfe Jennings

from the album The Phoenix
- Released: 2006
- Genre: R&B
- Length: 4:35
- Label: Sony Urban Music/Columbia
- Songwriter: Jennings
- Producer: Lyfe Jennings

Lyfe Jennings singles chronology
"S.E.X." (2006)	"Let's Stay Together" (2006)	"Cops Up" (2007)

"Let's Stay Together" was the second single released from American singer Lyfe Jennings' second album The Phoenix. It peaked at #32 on the Billboard Hot R&B/Hip-Hop Songs chart in February 2007. Jennings has performed both his own "Let’s Stay Together" and Al Green's classic of the same name together in concert.

== Charts ==
Chart (2007)	Peak position
U.S. Billboard Hot R&B/Hip-Hop Songs	32
