= STATS =

STATS may refer to:

- Statistical Assessment Service
- STATS LLC, a former name of Stats Perform, most notable for compiling one of the main ranking systems in NCAA Division I FCS football

== See also ==
- Stats
