= Bussy-le-Château =

- Commune
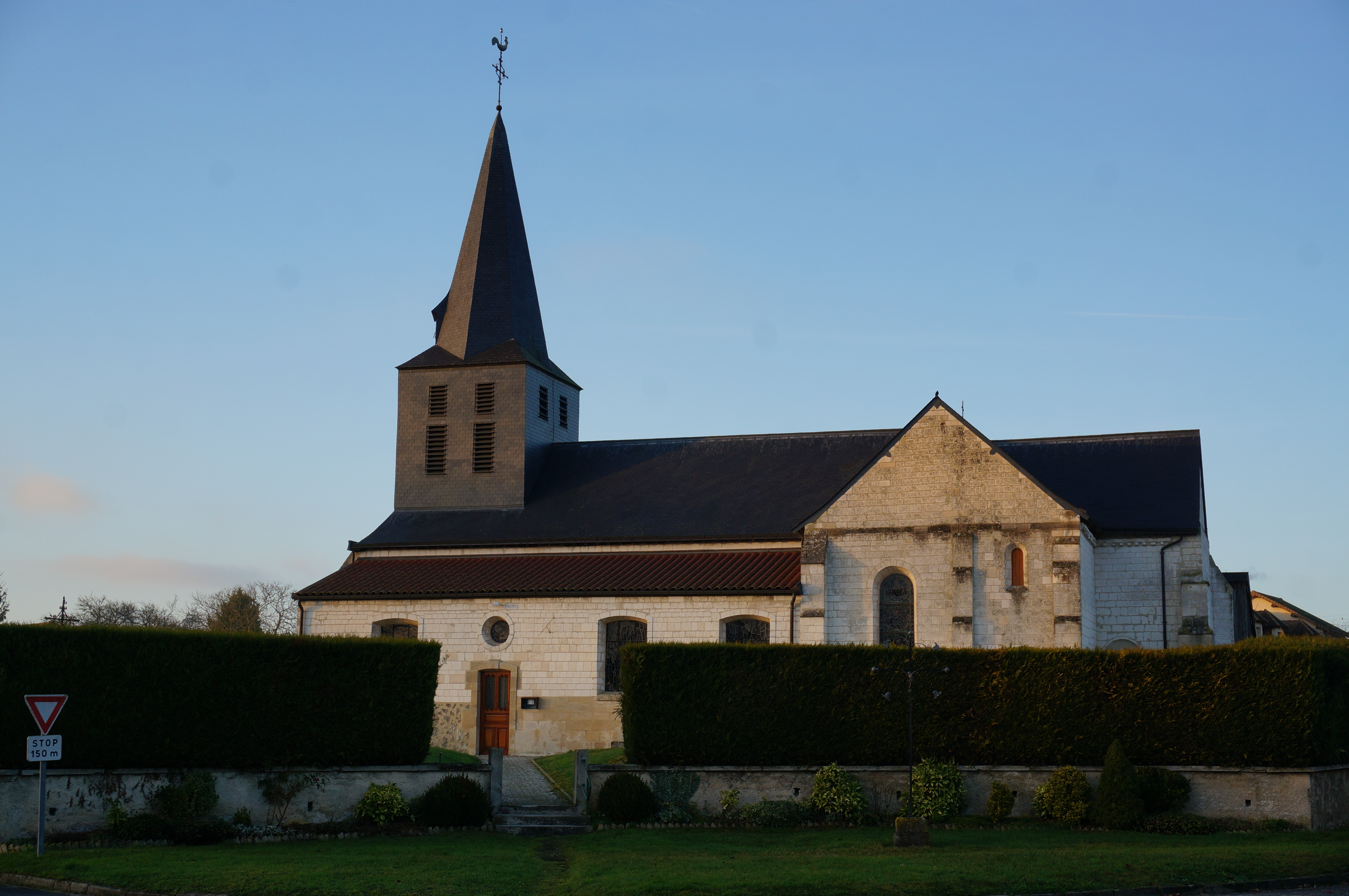
- Église Saint-Hilaire in Bussy-le-Château
- Location of Bussy-le-Château
- Location within France Location within Grand Est
- Coordinates: 49°03′51″N 4°32′32″E
- Country: France
- Region: Grand Est
- Department: Marne
- Arrondissement: Châlons-en-Champagne
- Canton: Argonne Suippe et Vesle
- Intercommunality: Région de Suippes

Government
  - Mayor (2020–2026): Jean-Luc Galichet
- Area^{1}: 23.93 km^{2} (9.24 sq mi)
- Elevation: 170 m (560 ft)
- Population (2023): 176
  - Density: 7.35/km^{2} (19.0/sq mi)
- Time zone: UTC+01:00 (CET)
  - Summer (DST): UTC+02:00 (CEST)
- INSEE/Postal code: 51097 /51600
- ^{1} French Land Register data, which excludes lakes, ponds, glaciers > 1 km^{2} (0.386 sq mi or 247 acres) and river estuaries.

Bussy-le-Château (French pronunciation: [bysi l(ə) ʃɑto]) is a commune in the Marne department in the Grand Est region of Northeastern France.

== Geography ==
Bussy-le-Château is located some 15 km (9.3 mi) northeast of Châlons-en-Champagne and 40 km (24.8 mi) southeast of Reims. Access to the commune is by road D79 from Suippes in the north which passes through the commune and the village and continues south to Courtisols. The D66 road comes from Somme-Tourbe in the northeast passing through the village and continuing west to La Cheppe. The D994 forms the southwestern border of the commune as it goes from La Cheppe to Nettancourt. The European route E50 passes through the south of the commune from west to east but has no exit in the commune. There is also a railway line (LGV Est) parallel to the E50 but no station in the commune. The commune consists almost entirely of farmland.

== Toponymy ==
The name Bussy comes from bu (wood) and yd (populated place). It has been known by many names over the course of time:

- Around 850 : Buxidum
- Around 1066: Buxitum Castelleum Municipium Buxiti Castri
- Around 1092: Bussiacum
- 1124-1130: Buxeium
- 1133-1142: Busseium
- 1161-1172: Buissi
- 1164: Villa Buseti
- 1170: Buisseyum ou Buiseium
- 1170: Buxi
- 1172: Bussey
- 1186: Buxi
- 1248: Bussi Castrum
- Around 1274: Boissi-Le-Chatel
- 1299: Bauscis
- 1314: Bussy-Le-Chastel
- 1352: Buissy (ou?) Buyssi
- 1392: Buxi-Le-Chastel en champagne
- 1396: Buissy-Le-Chastel
- 1405: Buissiacum Castrum
- 1546: Bussy-En-Champagne
- 1794: Bussy-Les-Mottes

== History ==
The Deanery of Bussy-le-Château and those of Châlons, Coole, and Vitry-en-Perthois were the four ecclesiastical districts which formed the large Archdeaconry of Chalons.

The deanery of Bussy contained the Parishes of La Cheppe, Coulmier (attached to Mutigny to form La Chaussée-sur-Marne), Coupéville, Courtisols, La Croix-en-Champagne, Dampierre-au-Temple, L'Epine, Le Fresne, Isle-sur-Marne, Juvigny, Marson, Pogny, Recy, Saint-Étienne-au-Temple, Saint-Remy-sur-Bussy, Sarry, Somme-Vesle, Tilloy-et-Bellay, Vésigneul-sur-Marne, and La Veuve.

In the 12th century Bussy-le-Château was in the County of Champagne, one of the 26 castellanies-prévôtés held in fief from the Emperor, the King of France, the Duke of Burgundy, the Abbey of Saint-Denis, the Archbishops of Reims and Sens, and the bishops of Châlons and Langres.

In the 16th and 17th centuries the lordship of Bussy-le-Château as well as the lordships of Reynel, Choiseul, Lafauche, Vavray-le-Grand, Blaise, Vignory, and Sexfontaines were part of the prerogative of the House of Amboise.

The Lordship of Bussy-le-Château was elevated to the rank of a Marquisate by letter in the month of January 1699. It was then under the control of the Arnolet de la Rochefontaine family. The title was confirmed in 1703.

In 1770, Bussy-le-Château was held by the Cappy family.

Bussy-le-Château takes its name from an ancient fort which appears to have been of considerable size.

During the French Revolution, following the decree of the National Convention of 16 October 1793 (25 vendémiaire Year II), which invited communes with names that recalled the memories of the monarchy, feudalism, or superstition, to replace them with other names, the commune changed its name to Bussy-les-Mottes due to five large mounds in the middle of the village which were arranged in a row along the river.

There was a war hospital outside the village during the First World War between the roads leading to Saint-Remy-sur-Bussy and Courtisols. There was also a railway for transport of troops.

== Administration ==
List of successive mayors

| From | To | Name |
|---|---|---|
| 1835 | 1839 | Jacquet-Létaudin |
| 1890 | | Augustin Prosper Bablot |
| 1891 | 1899 | Louis Félix Oudard |
| | 1906 | Cyrille Sophrone Laloua |
| 1907 | 1912 | Ernest René Gautier |
| | | Collard |
| | | Georges Notret |
| | 1965 | Albert Musset |
| 1965 | 1987 | Daniel Godard |
| 1987 | 2003 | Hubert Laloua |
| 2003 | 2014 | Jean-Marie Godart |
| 2014 | 2020 | Gilles Gossart |
| 2020 | 2026 | Jean-Luc Galichet |

== Demographics ==
The inhabitants of the commune are known as Bussinais (masculine) and Bussinaises (feminine) in French.

Historical population

| Year | Pop. | ±% p.a. |
|---|---|---|
| 1793 | 376 | — |
| 1821 | 400 | +0.22% |
| 1846 | 423 | +0.22% |
| 1872 | 343 | −0.80% |
| 1901 | 287 | −0.61% |
| 1926 | 273 | −0.20% |
| 1946 | 200 | −1.54% |
| 1962 | 227 | +0.79% |
| 1968 | 266 | +2.68% |

| Year | Pop. | ±% p.a. |
|---|---|---|
| 1975 | 223 | −2.49% |
| 1982 | 216 | −0.45% |
| 1990 | 195 | −1.27% |
| 1999 | 178 | −1.01% |
| 2007 | 163 | −1.09% |
| 2012 | 167 | +0.49% |
| 2017 | 171 | +0.47% |
| 2023 | 176 | +0.48% |

Source: EHESS and INSEE

== Economy ==
Most of the inhabitants of the village derive their income from intensive agriculture (wheat, barley, canola, peas, alfalfa, beets, potatoes, carrots, and, in the past, tobacco, corn, sunflower, lentils...). There are also some cattle. A local vegetable called the Boulette de Bussy (Bussy dumpling), is a variety of turnip known for its finesse and cooked notably at the starred restaurant "Les Crayères" in Reims.

It is possible to stay in Bussy-le-Château in a guesthouse.

There are no shops.

== Local culture and heritage ==
=== Cultural events and festivals ===
The Village Festival takes place the weekend after Saint-Luc on 18 October. There are traditionally some fairground rides and the Suippes band interprets a variety of works from classical to contemporary.

A cyclo-cross race "bike and run" has taken place every year since 2009 in May organized by La Pédale Suippase. It has been increasingly successful over time. Its course passes through the village along some tumuli and crosses the river: it may be performed in its entirety almost all year round.

=== Sites and monuments ===
The commune has five Tumuli on its territory including three which are relatively intact in a line along the river. Two of the Tumuli are registered as historical monuments.

Their names are:

1. Lebel: east of the Chateau Tholengo
2. La Grosse Tour: A larger tumulus built by the Romans, it was purchased on 5 December 1863 on behalf of the department as a historical monument commemorating the battle of Mauriac (at La Cheppe) where Attila was defeated by the allied Roman army in 451.
3. La Petite Tour: Built by the Visigoths who were seconded by the Alani and who had contributed most to the deliverance of the country
4. La Voisaiterie: Partly destroyed and lacking history
5. Le Châtel: A larger tumulus built by the Burgundians. A windmill was built in the middle of its flattened cone (with, it is said, stones from the castle of which no trace remains) and is still visible despite the vegetation that has invaded. It was on this mound that a ritual was held on Easter day by men of the village and youth in general who came out of Mass and drank an entire bottle of red wine in Roman style (i.e. without the neck touching the lips) in one go then tried to break the bottle by throwing it down the hill, on the soft earth of the lane. The game is very simple and could be tried several times, ascending and descending the hill, more for the alcohol rather than success in the game. The game was ended after the Ponts-et-Chaussées had the excuse of a deterioration of the roadway to have it banned.

To the east of the tumuli are the remains of an ancient castle.

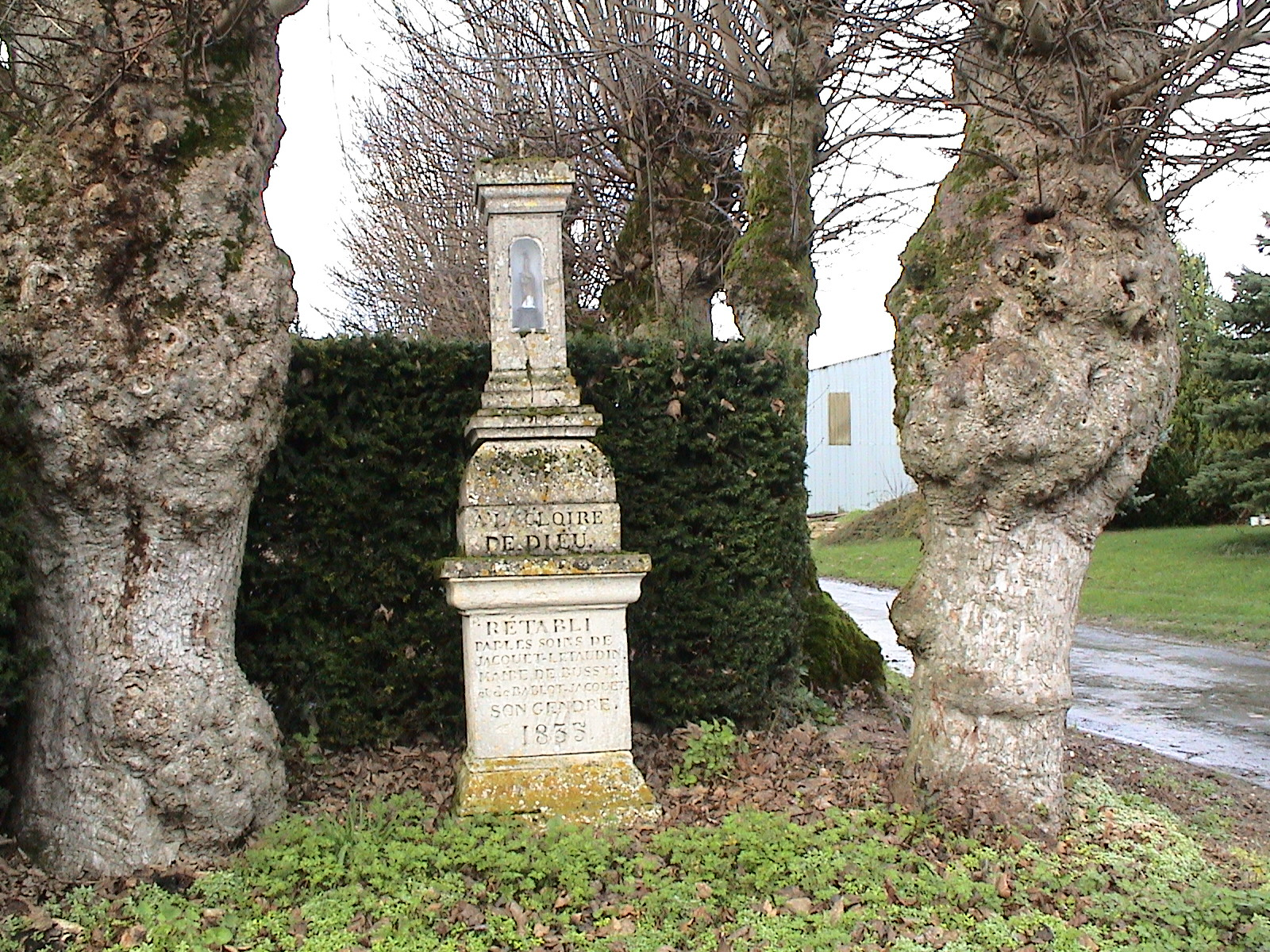
The Oratory of Saint-Nicolas

The oldest oratory identified in the Marne is in Bussy-le-Château on the western outskirts of the village. Dedicated to Saint Nicolas, an inscription reads: "to the glory of God restored through the efforts of Jacquet-Létaudin Mayor of Bussy and Bablot-Jacquet his son in 1835".

There was a military cemetery after the First World War with of hundreds of soldiers' graves in the street now called now "Rue du Rouillon". The graves were transferred to Sommepy-Tahure in the 1950s.

The 294th Infantry Regiment made a passage through Bussy-le-Château.

The commune has no shops although in the past there were a butcher shop, a bakery and several cafes. The elementary school, which was located in Bussy-le-Château Town Hall, has been closed since 2005: children go to school in the communal group school in Saint-Remy-sur-Bussy. The football field is now a cultivated field. There were Masses once a week in the church in the 19th century but there have been none since the death of the last parish priest, Father Jean Colmart.

=== Historical aerial views of Bussy-le-Château ===
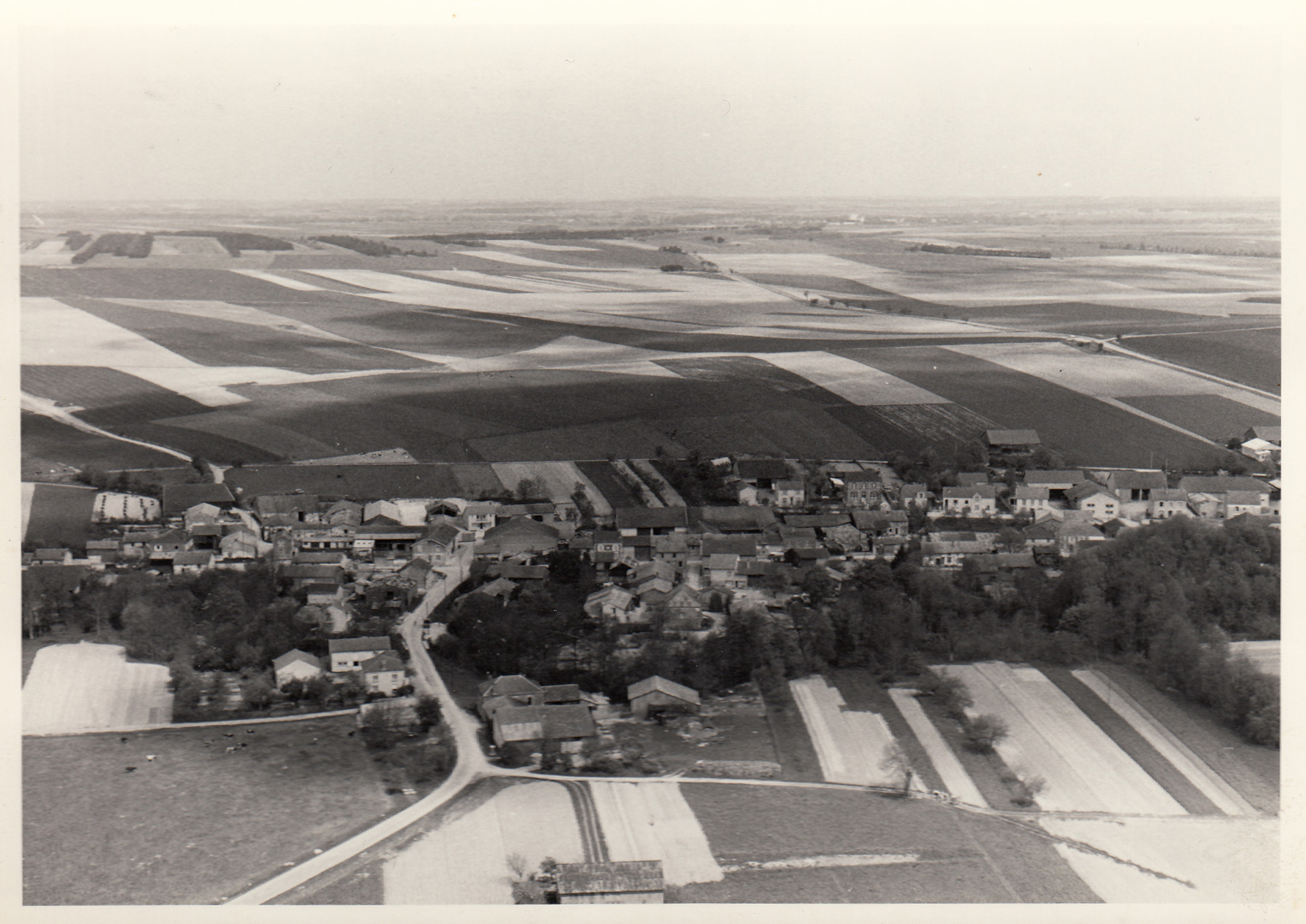
General view

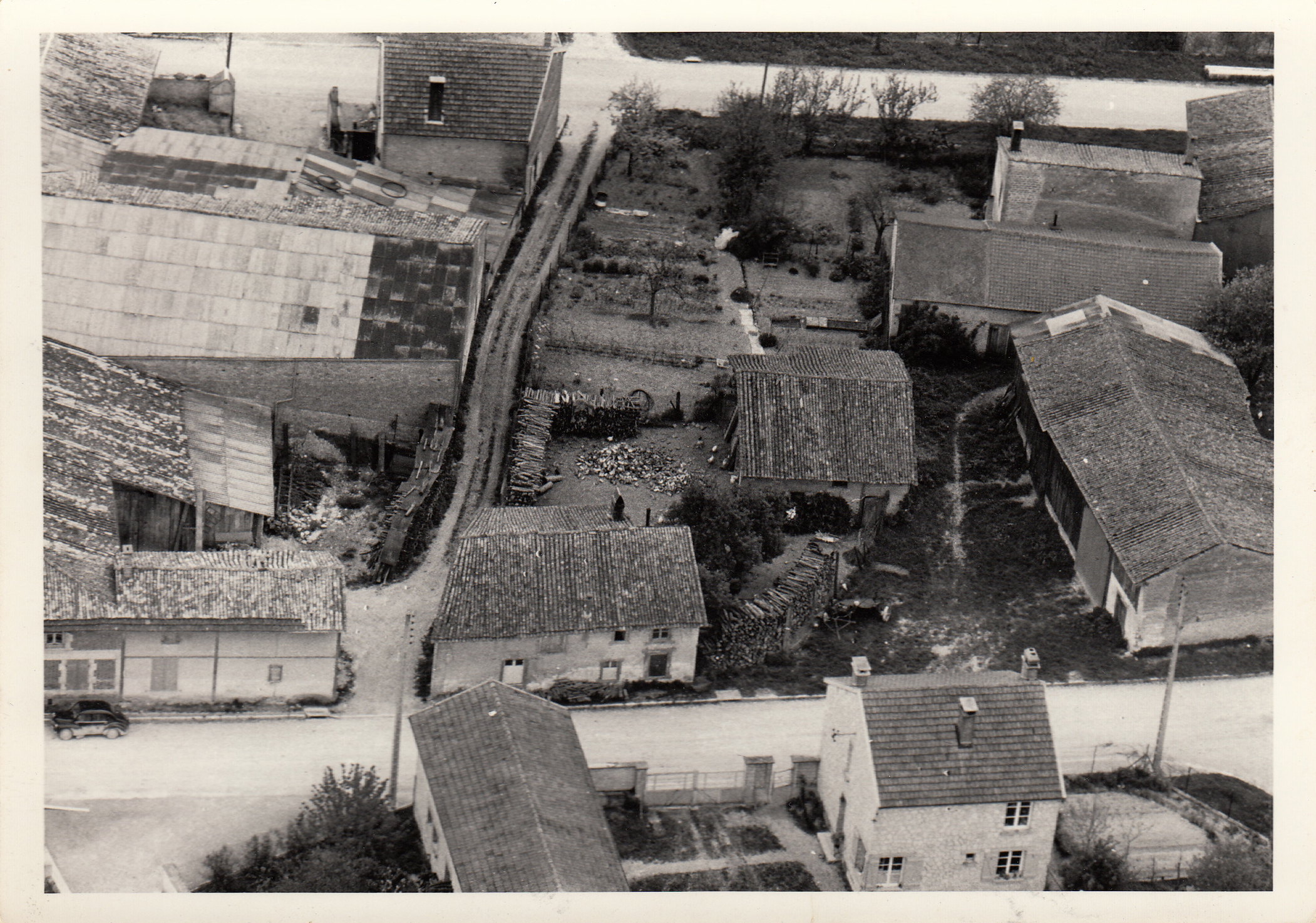
Detail

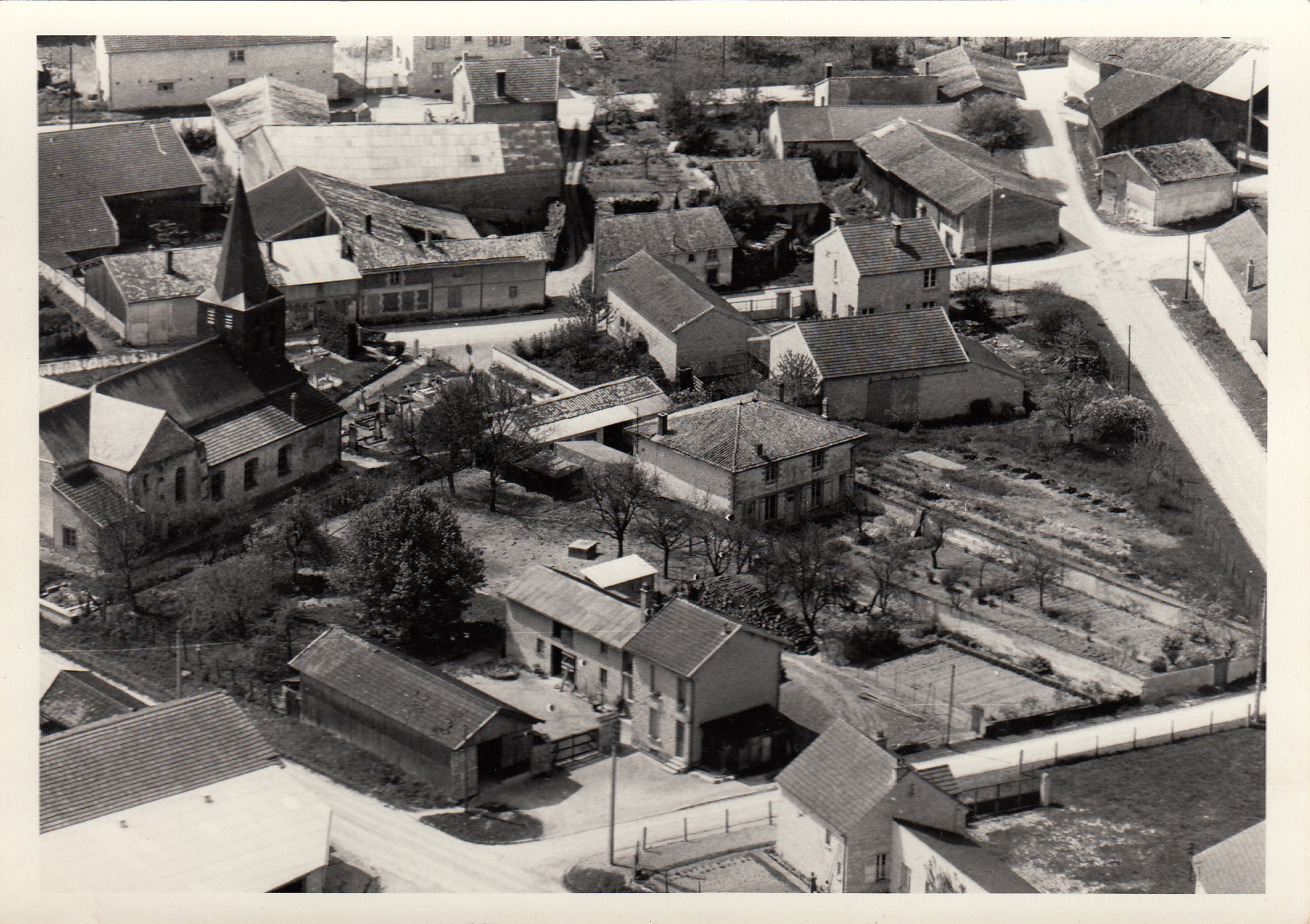
Church and village centre

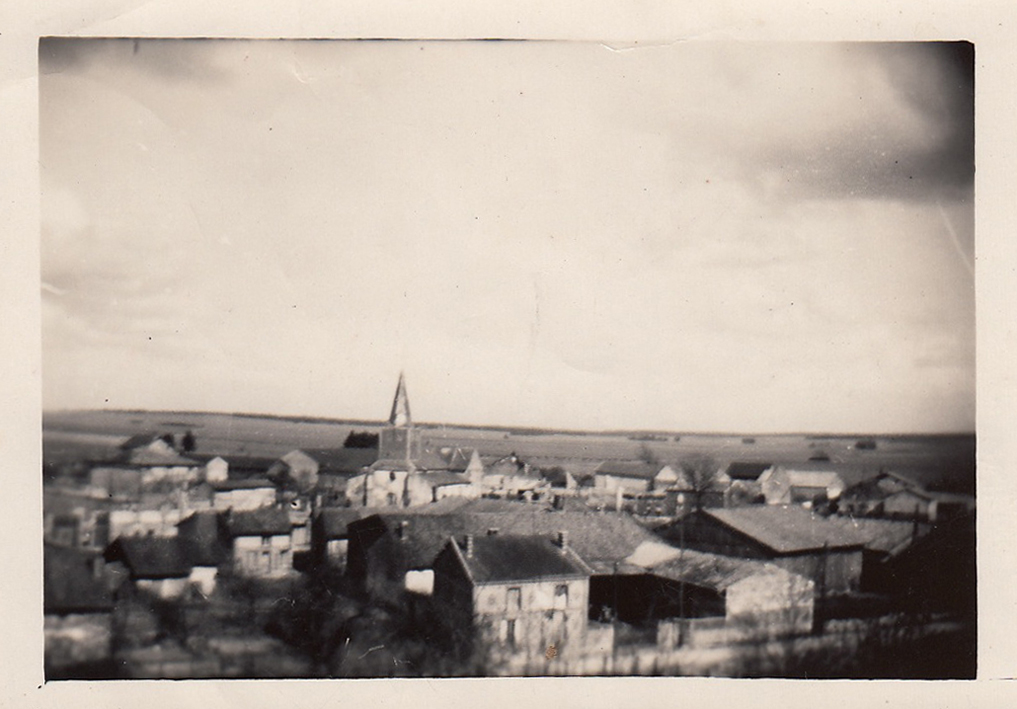
View of the hill

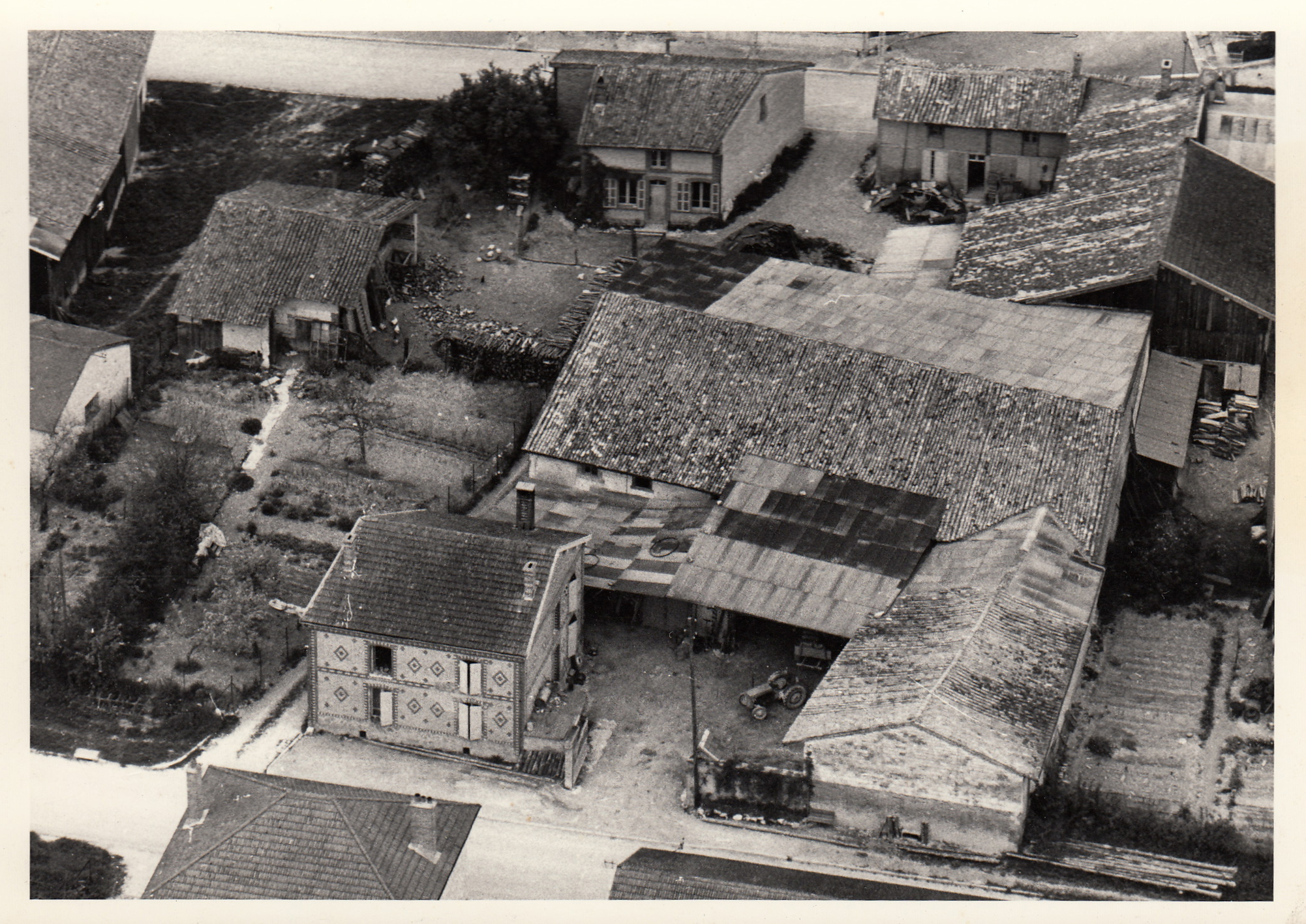
A farm in Bussy-le-Château

== Notable people linked to the commune ==
- Guermond (or Germond) de Châtillon, Lord of Bussy-le-Château, died around 1142, husband of Clémence de Roucy (born around 1125, died before 1170)
- Guermond (or Germond) II de Châtillon, Châtelain of Bussy, married Sibylle in 1172
- Jean de Saulx, Lord of Bussy-le-Château (born around 1330, died after 1380), also Lord of Cernon and Captain of Sainte-Menehould
- Alice de Chalon, Lady of Bussy, circa 1400–1457
- Jean IV d'Amboise, born around 1440, died on 18 April 1516, the origin of the family branch of Bussy d'Amboise.
- Jacques d'Amboise, Lord of Bussy, son of Jean IV d'Amboise. Died at the beginning of the 16th century in the Italian wars.
- Jean d'Amboise, Lord of Bussy, father of Renée d'Amboise and Jacques d'Amboise
- Louis d'Amboise, Lord of Bussy (1549–1579), great-grandson of Jean IV d'Amboise
- Jacques d'Amboise, Lord of Bussy
- Renée d'Amboise, Lady of Bussy, mother of Jacques de Clermont-d'Amboise
- Jacques de Clermont-d'Amboise, born around 1525, died in 1587.

The Bussy-d'Amboise family branch died out on 12 May 1626.

- Charles d'Amboise, son of Georges d'Amboise and Lucrèce Castel san Nazarre, youngest son of Jacques d'Amboise and Catherine Beaunau. He married Jeanne de Montluc, his cousin and had a son, Henry, Baron of Bussy le Château, who was killed in a duel in the Royal Palace in 1637.
- Antoine-François de Lameth, Marquis of Bussy
- Louis Claude-François de Châtillon, Squire, Lord of the bans of Souaitre and Bussy, Canon of Reims
- François Cappy, Lord of Athys, great and small Écury, Champagne, Bussy-le-Château, La Cheppe, and Cuperly The Cappy family were lords of Athys, Oiry, Foinville, great and small Écury, Champagne, Bussy-le-Château, Bussy-L'Estrée, L'Estrée, La Cheppe, Recy, and Cuperly
- Gilles-Jean-François-Denis de Cappy, Lord of Athis, Bussy, La Cheppe, and Cuperly, former Captain of the Royal-Champagne regiment, Knight of Saint-Louis
- Pierre Brisson, agronomist, principal of the College of Châlons, etc. born at Soudron (Marne) on 4 February 1758, died at Châlons on 10 February 1838. After having resigned as Principal of the college in 1822, he immediately received the title of Dean of Bussy-le-Château
- Léon Mangean (born 4 March 1880 in Paris. Soldier 2nd class in the 233rd Infantry regiment. Died for France on 27 October 1915 at Bussy-le-Château (Marne) from war wounds
- Jules Cleret (Jules-Emile-François Cleret). Born on 12 October 1884 at Méricourt. Sergeant in the 233rd Infantry Regiment. ID No. 1418, recruited in Arras. Died for France on 9 October 1915 at Bussy-le-Château from war wounds.
- Paul Henri Charles Cardon, born on 20 March 1897 at Albert (80). ID No. 36486/78 - Class of 1914. Corporal 1st class. Died from war wounds in the ambulance on 19 October 1918 at Bussy le Château.
- Father Jean Colmart (born on 27 June 1920 at Suippes, died on 3 November 2003). He succeeded Father Laire at Bussy-le-Château and lived there for his entire ministry. He was municipal councillor for Bussy-le-Château.

The 8 members of the crew of a Stirling III of No. 622 Squadron RAF (code GI-Q), a bomber of the Commonwealth forces, were shot down over the commune on 18 November 1943 while flying to Mannheim (Germany) for a bombing mission. Their bodies have been buried in the cemetery on the north side of the church since 20 November 1943.

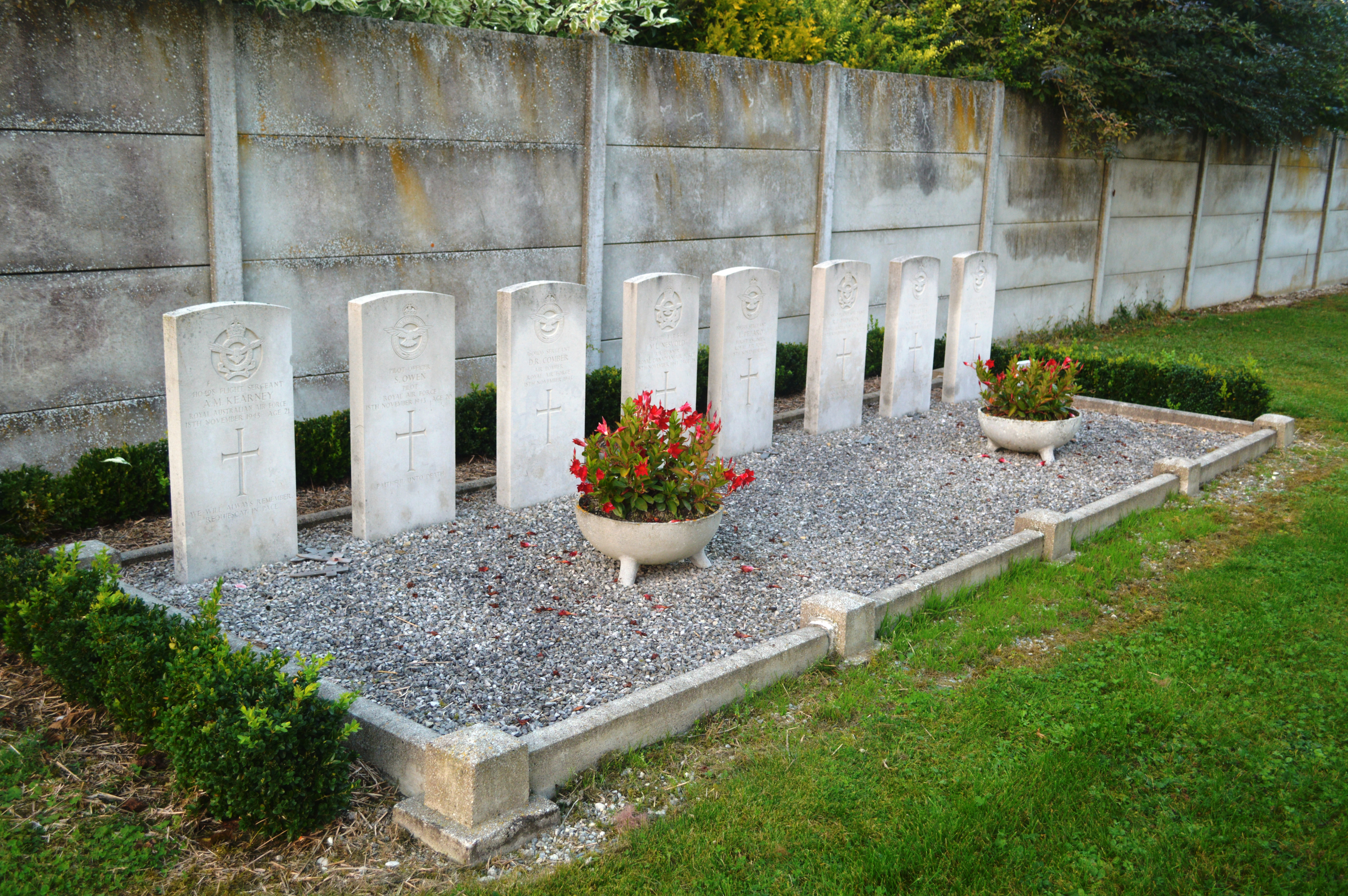
Bussy-le-Château The Airmen's Graves

The 8 crew members were:

- Augustine Michael KEARNEY, Royal Australian Air Force, 21 years old, 410498 Flight Sergeant (upper gunner)
- Stanley OWEN, Royal Air Force, 20 years old, Pilot Officer (pilot in command)
- Douglas Ralph COMBER, Royal Air Force, 21 years old, 1601106 Sergeant, (Bombardier),
- Millard Leon NESVOLD, Royal Canadian Air Force, 28 years old, R159321 Flight Sergeant (Air gunner)
- Louis PEZARO Royal Air Force, 1583515 Sergeant (Flight Engineer)
- Russel James THOMSON, Royal Australian Air Force, 25 years old, 409862 Flight Sergeant (Second pilot)
- Stanley WILLETTS, Royal Air Force, 21 years old, Flying Officer (Navigator)
- George H. AUSTIN, Royal Air Force, 1390546 Sergeant (Wireless Operator/Air Gunner)

== See also ==
- Communes of the Marne department
