= Statistics (disambiguation) =

Statistics is the discipline relating to the collection, analysis, interpretation, and presentation of data.

Statistic or statistics may also refer to:

- Statistic, the result of applying a statistical algorithm to a set of data
- Statistic (role-playing games), a piece of data which represents a particular aspect of a fictional character
- Statistics (band), an American rock band
- "Statistics" (song), by Lyfe Jennings, 2010
