= S.E.X. (song) =

Single by Lyfe Jennings

from the album The Phoenix
- Released: August 1, 2006
- Recorded: 2006
- Genre: R&B
- Label: Sony Urban Music/Columbia Records
- Songwriter: Lyfe Jennings
- Producer: Lyfe Jennings

Lyfe Jennings singles chronology
"Hypothetically" (2006)	"S.E.X." (2006)	"Lets Stay Together" (2006)

"S.E.X." is the first single by Lyfe Jennings from his second album The Phoenix and features guest vocals from LaLa Brown. The song is about young teens losing their virginity from pressure.

"S.E.X." debuted on the Billboard Hot 100 chart at number 99 and slipped off just to re-enter the following week again at number 99. It eventually peaked at number 37, making it Lyfe's most successful single. "S.E.X." was a top-five hit on the Billboard Hot R&B/Hip-Hop Songs chart and received strong airplay on BET and some airplay on radio and MTV. The music video was directed by Benny Boom.

== Composition ==
Jennings said in an interview with Jet that "S.E.X." was "a song I had wanted to write for a long time". He elaborated that upon returning home from his prison sentence, he noticed "how quickly women are developing and how guys get the wrong impression and how [women] get the wrong impression of themselves".

== Charts ==
=== Weekly charts ===
Chart (2006)	Peak position
US Billboard Hot 100	37
US Hot R&B/Hip-Hop Songs (Billboard)	3
US Rhythmic Airplay (Billboard)	16

=== Year-end charts ===
Chart (2006)	Position
US Hot R&B/Hip-Hop Songs (Billboard)	26
