= Must Be Nice (Lyfe Jennings song) =

2004 single by Lyfe Jennings

Single by Lyfe Jennings

from the album Lyfe 268-192
- Released: August 2, 2004
- Recorded: 2004
- Genre: R&B, neo soul
- Length: 4:19
- Label: Sony Urban Music/Columbia
- Songwriter: Lyfe Jennings
- Producer: Lyfe Jennings

Lyfe Jennings singles chronology
"Stick Up Kid" (2004)	"Must Be Nice" (2004)	"Hypothetically" (2005)

"Must Be Nice" is the second single released from R&B/soul musician Lyfe Jennings' 2004 debut album, Lyfe 268–192. The song rose to #40 on the U.S. Billboard Hot 100 singles chart, while making it to #5 on the Billboard Hot R&B/Hip-Hop Songs chart. A remix with New York rapper Nas is featured on the Special Edition version of Lyfe 268–192. The music video (directed by Bernard Gourley) for this song was shot in Concourse, Bronx, New York.

== Usage in media ==
The song was featured on the 2006 film ATL.

== Charts ==
=== Weekly charts ===
Chart (2005)	Peak position
Netherlands (Urban Top 100)	52
US Billboard Hot 100	40
US Hot R&B/Hip-Hop Songs (Billboard)	5
US Rhythmic Airplay (Billboard)	38

=== Year-end charts ===
Chart (2005)	Position
US Hot R&B/Hip-Hop Songs (Billboard)	13
Chart (2006)	Position
US Hot R&B/Hip-Hop Songs (Billboard)	88
