= Yolanda Brown (singer) =

American contemporary R&B singer

LaLa Brown
- Born: Yolanda Rose Brown; May 20, 1986; Milwaukee, Wisconsin, U.S.
- Died: October 19, 2007 (aged 21); Milwaukee, Wisconsin, U.S.
- Cause of death: Homicide
- Resting place: Graceland Cemetery in Milwaukee, Wisconsin, U.S.
- Children: 1

Yolanda Rose "LaLa" Brown (May 20, 1986 – October 19, 2007) was an American R&B singer best known for being featured on the track "S.E.X." with Lyfe Jennings, which reached No. 3 on the Billboard Hot R&B/Hip-Hop Songs chart and peaked at No. 37 on the Billboard Hot 100 in October 2006. Brown and her record producer JeTannue "Kool Aid" Clayborn were murdered on October 19, 2007, at a recording studio in Milwaukee, Wisconsin. The case remains unsolved.

== Early life ==
Yolanda Rose "LaLa" Brown was born on May 20, 1986, in Milwaukee, Wisconsin, to Maria and William Brown. Brown's mother is of Mexican descent. Her father is African American. She was the youngest of five children. Her parents had stated that she had a talent for entertainment "from her first steps, always singing and dancing around the house." Therefore, it was no surprise to those who knew her when she began to pursue a career in music. At the age of eleven, Brown started singing professionally, using the stage name "Pre-mere"; she often sang at weddings and, later, various bars. She attended Frederick Douglass Elementary School, Jackie Robinson Middle School, and Milwaukee High School of the Arts. At the age of 16, in 2002, Brown gave birth to a daughter, Amirah Airreal Brown. She also loved giving back to her community.

== Career ==
In fall 2005, Brown traveled to Atlanta, Georgia in hopes of furthering her career, believing there she would have a better chance to meet artists, producers, and songwriters who could assist her. Brown finally got the big break she was hoping for when R&B singer-songwriter Lyfe Jennings asked her to be on his new track "S.E.X." She was a featured singer and appeared in the music video. The track "S.E.X." was a cautionary tale warning adolescent girls about the pitfalls and dangers of unprotected sex and appeared on his second studio album The Phoenix. She then toured with Jennings, but was released following a disagreement with him. In June 2007, Brown returned to Milwaukee, still set on becoming a solo artist and began working on her debut album. Brown recorded three songs, "I'm Feeling It", "Rescue Me", and "Give Them What They Want", the latter a song many believe is autobiographical. Those songs were all released prior to her death.

== Death ==
On October 22, 2007, Brown and her record producer/boyfriend, JeTannue "Kool-Aid" Clayborn, were discovered by Clayborn's brother, shot and killed by an unknown gunman in the Loud Enuff Productionz recording studio in Milwaukee. Both had been dead at least 3 days before they were discovered, with the date of the murder later determined to be October 19, 2007. Although autopsies were performed on both Brown and Clayborn, results were never released. Brown was survived by her mother, father, siblings, as well as her daughter.

Brown's funeral was held on October 25, 2007, at the Mason Temple Church of God in Christ, Milwaukee. Hundreds of people attended, including Lyfe Jennings. Burial followed at Graceland Cemetery in Milwaukee. The case was featured on America's Most Wanted in February 2010. On October 22, 2012, TV One aired a Celebrity Crime Files episode about Brown's life and death. As of August 2024, the case has not been solved and police continue to search for a suspect and motive for the killings.

== See also ==
- List of homicides in Wisconsin
