= Never Never Land (song) =

Single by Lyfe Jennings

from the album Lyfe Change
- B-side: "2008"
- Length: 4.18
- Label: Columbia
- Songwriter(s): Lyfe Jennings

Never Never Land is a single from Lyfe Jennings from his third studio album Lyfe Change.

== Charts ==
=== Weekly charts ===
Chart (2008)	Peak position
US Bubbling Under Hot 100 Singles (Billboard)	2
US Hot R&B/Hip-Hop Songs (Billboard)	18

=== Year-end charts ===
Chart (2008)	Position
US Hot R&B/Hip-Hop Songs (Billboard)	56
