= I Still Believe (album) =

2010 album by Lyfe Jennings

Studio album by Lyfe Jennings
- Released: August 31, 2010
- Recorded: 2009–2010
- Genre: R&B
- Length: 44:50
- Label: Jesus Swings, Asylum, Warner Bros.
- Producer: Lyfe Jennings (exec.) T-Minus; Troy Taylor, Bryan-Michael Cox

Lyfe Jennings chronology
Lyfe Change (2008)	I Still Believe (2010)	Lucid (2013)

Singles from I Still Believe
- 1. "Busy" Released: February 23, 2010; 2. "Statistics" Released: June 22, 2010

Professional ratings
Review scores
Source	Rating
About	4.5/5 stars
Allmusic	3.5/5 stars
USA Today	3/4 stars
DJBooth.net	4/5 stars

I Still Believe is the fourth studio album by American R&B artist Lyfe Jennings, released on August 31, 2010 on Asylum Records and Warner Bros. Records.

== Background ==
The album was originally titled Sooner or Later and set to be released in 2009 but was pushed to a 2010 release due to Lyfe wanting more time to make this his best album. Lyfe stated this will be his final album because family issues involving his children but he has said he will still do some behind the scene work and a couple features every so often. Lyfe has also said: "I never compare any of my other albums to 268-192, because they were different – special, but different at the same time. I think this album here is definitely comparable to the first time I really had a couple of different features, dream features that I can do songs with. It's not over yet, this is the last album to finish your collection."

== Singles ==
- "Busy", is the first official single from the album, it's produced by Lyfe Jennings and was released on February 23, 2010.
- "Statistics", is the second single from the album, it is produced by T-Minus and was released on June 22, 2010. The music video was released on June 14, 2010.

== Guests ==
The guests that were confirmed to be on the album were Bryan-Michael Cox, Warryn Campbell, Fabolous, Bobby V, Ludacris, Anthony Hamilton and Jazmine Sullivan.

== Sales and chart performance ==
The album debuted at #6 on the Billboard 200 with over 36,000 copies sold in the first week released.

== Track listing ==
No.	Title	Producer(s)	Length
1.	"Statistics"	T-Minus	3:25
2.	"Love"	T-Minus	3:20
3.	"It Coulda Been Worse"	Lyfe Jennings	3:31
4.	"Spotlight"	Lyfe Jennings	3:22
5.	"Busy"	Lyfe Jennings	2:59
6.	"Whatever She Wants"	Eric Hudson	3:53
7.	"Mama" (featuring Anthony Hamilton)	Lyfe Jennings	3:14
8.	"Hero"	Troy Taylor	3:17
9.	"I Still Believe"	Bryan-Michael Cox	3:23
10.	"Learn from This"	T-Minus	3:43
11.	"Done Crying"	Lyfe Jennings	2:55
12.	"If I Knew Then, What I Know Now"	Lyfe Jennings	3:35
13.	"If Tomorrow Never Comes" (Bonus Track)	Lyfe Jennings	4:14

iTunes Bonus Tracks
No.	Title	Writer(s)	Length
14.	"Learn from This" (Acoustic version)	Lyfe Jennings	3:52
15.	"Done Crying" (Acoustic version)	Lyfe Jennings	3:03
16.	"If I Knew Then, What I Know Now" (Acoustic version)	Lyfe Jennings	3:54

== Charts ==
=== Weekly charts ===
Chart (2010)	Peak position
US Billboard 200	6
US Top R&B/Hip-Hop Albums (Billboard)	3

=== Year-end charts ===
Chart (2010)	Position
US Top R&B/Hip-Hop Albums (Billboard)	65
