= Bussy-sur-Morges =

Coordinates: 46°31′36″N 6°26′45″E

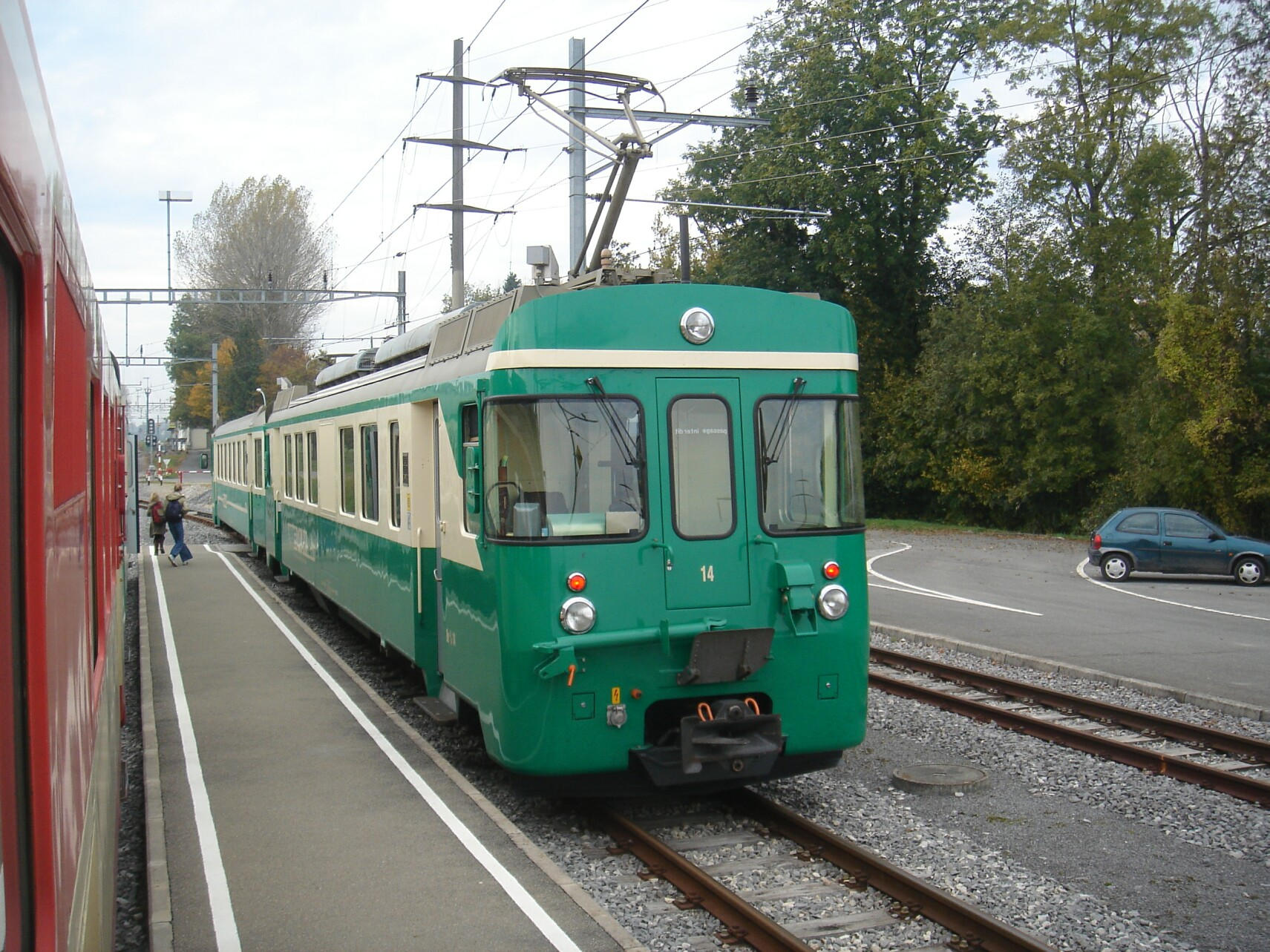
MBC motor coach Be 4/4 14 (ex-13) with driving trailer Bt 53 leaving Bussy-sur-Morges (Switzerland) station, now called Bussy-Chardonney

Bussy-sur-Morges is a village and former municipality in the district of Morges in the canton of Vaud, Switzerland.

It was first recorded in year 1059 as Bussi.

In 1961, the municipality was merged with the neighboring municipality Chardonney-sur-Morges to form a new and larger municipality Bussy-Chardonney. This union had formerly existed before 1744 and between 1799 and 1819.

The village is served by a station on the Bière–Apples–Morges railway.
