= Lucid (Lyfe Jennings album) =

Studio album by Lyfe Jennings
- Released: October 8, 2013
- Recorded: 2012–2013
- Genre: R&B
- Length: 36:26
- Label: Mass Appeal Entertainment, Fontana

Lyfe Jennings chronology
I Still Believe (2010)	Lucid (2013)	Tree of Lyfe (2015)

Singles from Lucid
- 1. "Boomerang" Released: May 8, 2013

Lucid is the fifth studio album by American R&B singer Lyfe Jennings. The album was released on October 8, 2013, by Mass Appeal Entertainment. On May 8, 2013, the album's first single "Boomerang" was released. On July 25, 2013, the music video was released for "Boomerang".

== Critical reception ==
Professional ratings
Review scores
Source	Rating
AllMusic	3/5 stars

Lucid was met with a generally positive reviews from music critics. Andy Kellman of AllMusic gave the album three out of five stars, saying "Jennings draws character sketches, spins cautionary tales—as someone still growing, learning from his mistakes—and largely sticks to the type of mature R&B that his listeners don't get from anyone else. He briefly breaks from the norm with "Rock," a classy but contemporary steppers groove that's one of his best songs. Despite a mostly new cast of collaborators—including TGT associate Brandon Hodge and producer/songwriter Lashaunda "Babygirl" Carr—Lucid is a natural progression for a veteran artist who seems to have plenty left to express."

== Track listing ==
No.	Title	Length
1.	"I Am"	3:45
2.	"Boomerang"	4:08
3.	"I Wish"	3:59
4.	"College"	3:39
5.	"Rock"	4:03
6.	"ABC's" (featuring Phoenix & Elijah Jennings)	2:58
7.	"17 to a Million" (featuring Jennifer Nelson)	3:37
8.	"When It's Good"	3:37
9.	"Famous"	3:46
10.	"Winner"	2:54

== Charts ==
Chart (2013)	Peak position
US Billboard 200	32
US Top R&B/Hip-Hop Albums (Billboard)	8
