= Saint-Remy-sur-Bussy =

- Commune
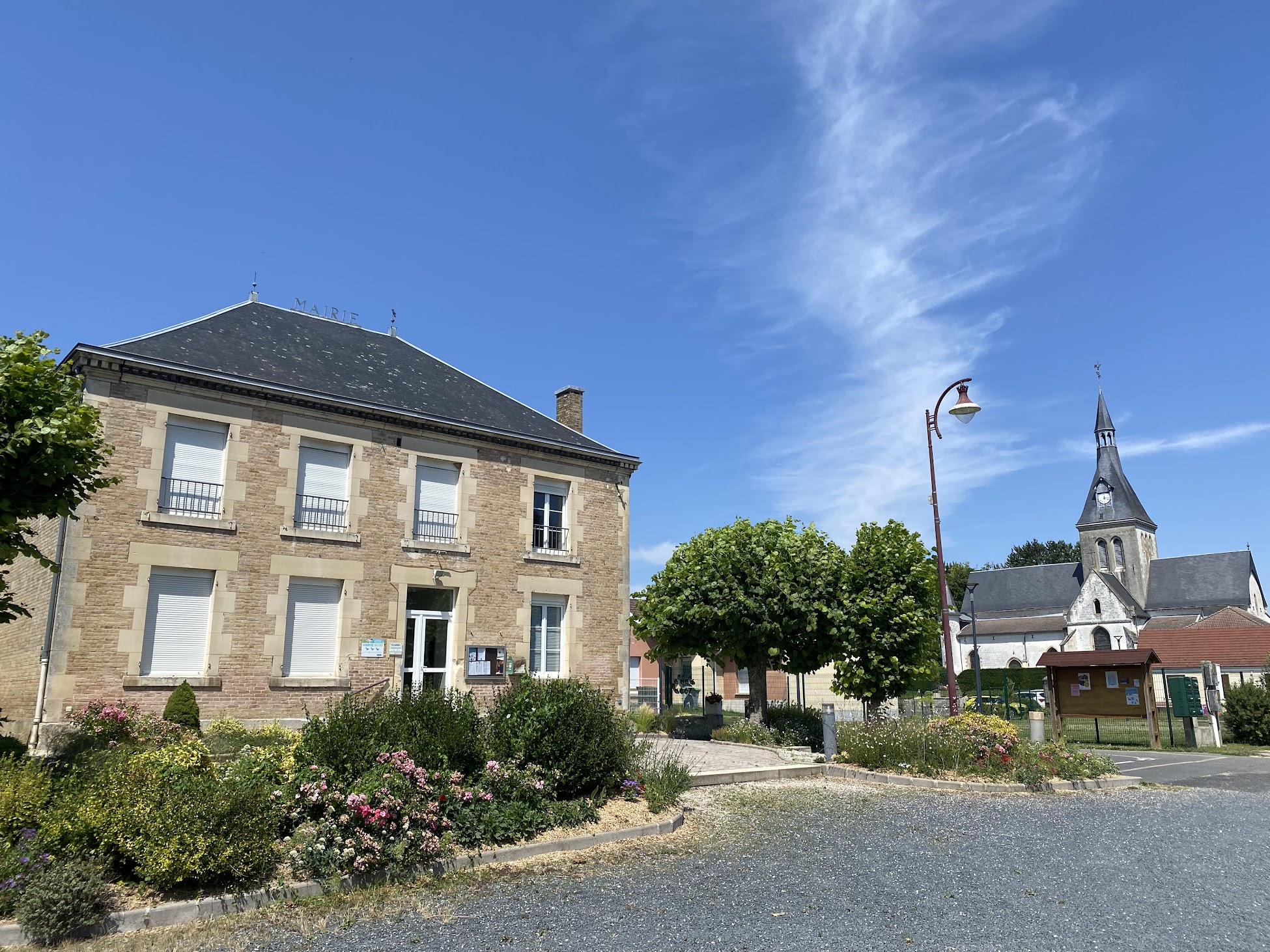
- The town hall and the church in Saint-Remy-sur-Bussy
- Location of Saint-Remy-sur-Bussy
- Location within France Location within Grand Est
- Coordinates: 49°03′26″N 4°34′56″E
- Country: France
- Region: Grand Est
- Department: Marne
- Arrondissement: Châlons-en-Champagne
- Canton: Argonne Suippe et Vesle
- Intercommunality: Région de Suippes

Government
  - Mayor (2020–2026): Jacky Hermant
- Area^{1}: 34.65 km^{2} (13.38 sq mi)
- Elevation: 147 m (482 ft)
- Population (2023): 325
  - Density: 9.38/km^{2} (24.3/sq mi)
- Time zone: UTC+01:00 (CET)
  - Summer (DST): UTC+02:00 (CEST)
- INSEE/Postal code: 51515 /51600
- ^{1} French Land Register data, which excludes lakes, ponds, glaciers > 1 km^{2} (0.386 sq mi or 247 acres) and river estuaries.

Saint-Remy-sur-Bussy (French pronunciation: [sɛ̃ ʁemi syʁ bysi], literally Saint-Remy on Bussy) is a commune in the Marne department in north-eastern France.

== See also ==
- Communes of the Marne department

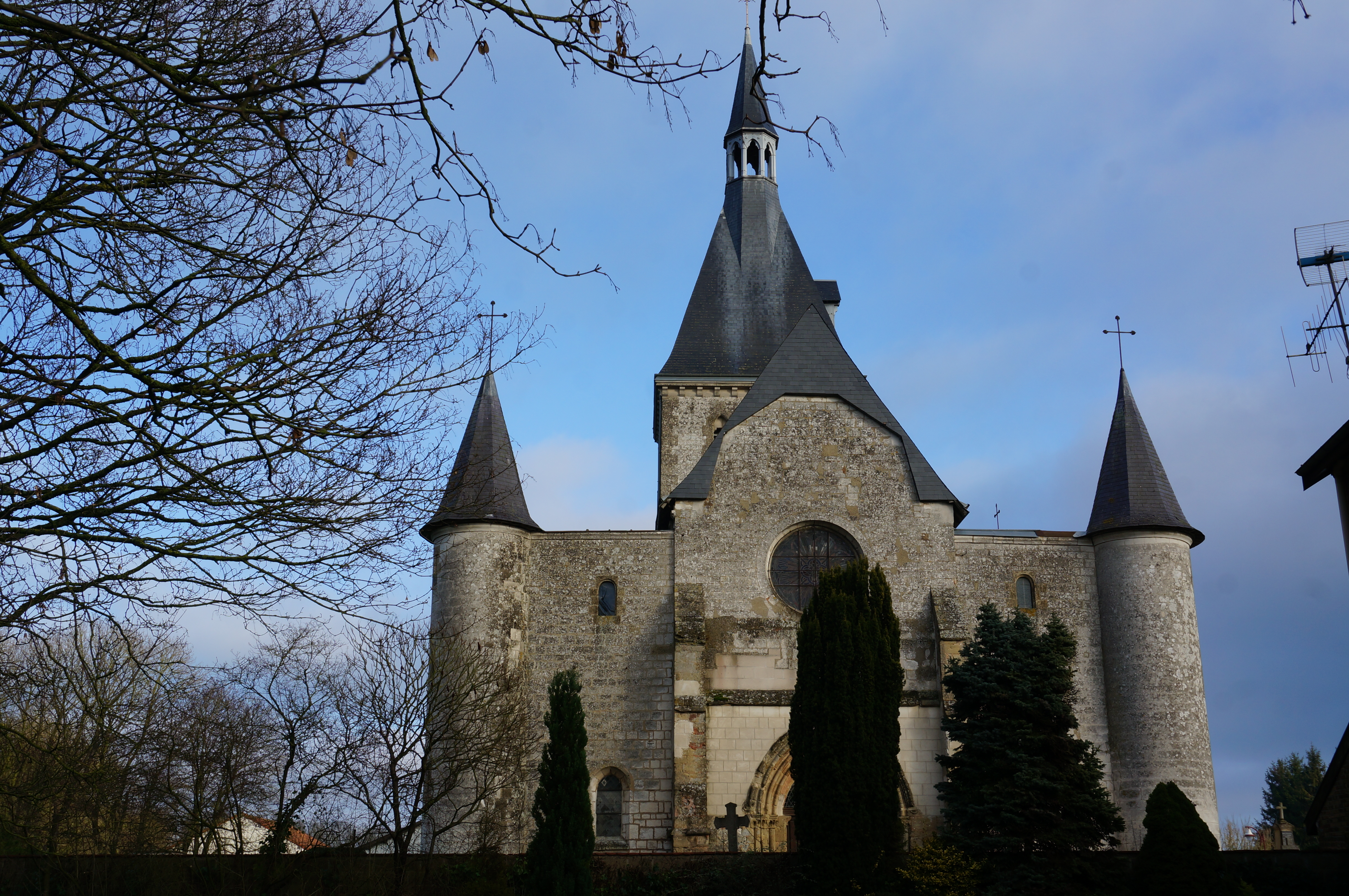
