= Busy signal (disambiguation) =

A busy signal is information communicated to a user or apparatus attempting a connection, indicating the requested connection cannot be completed.

- Busy Signal (born 1982), or Reanno Gordon, a dancehall singer from Jamaica
- "Busy Signal", a song by Prefuse 73 from the 2003 album One Word Extinguisher
