= La Cheppe =

- Commune
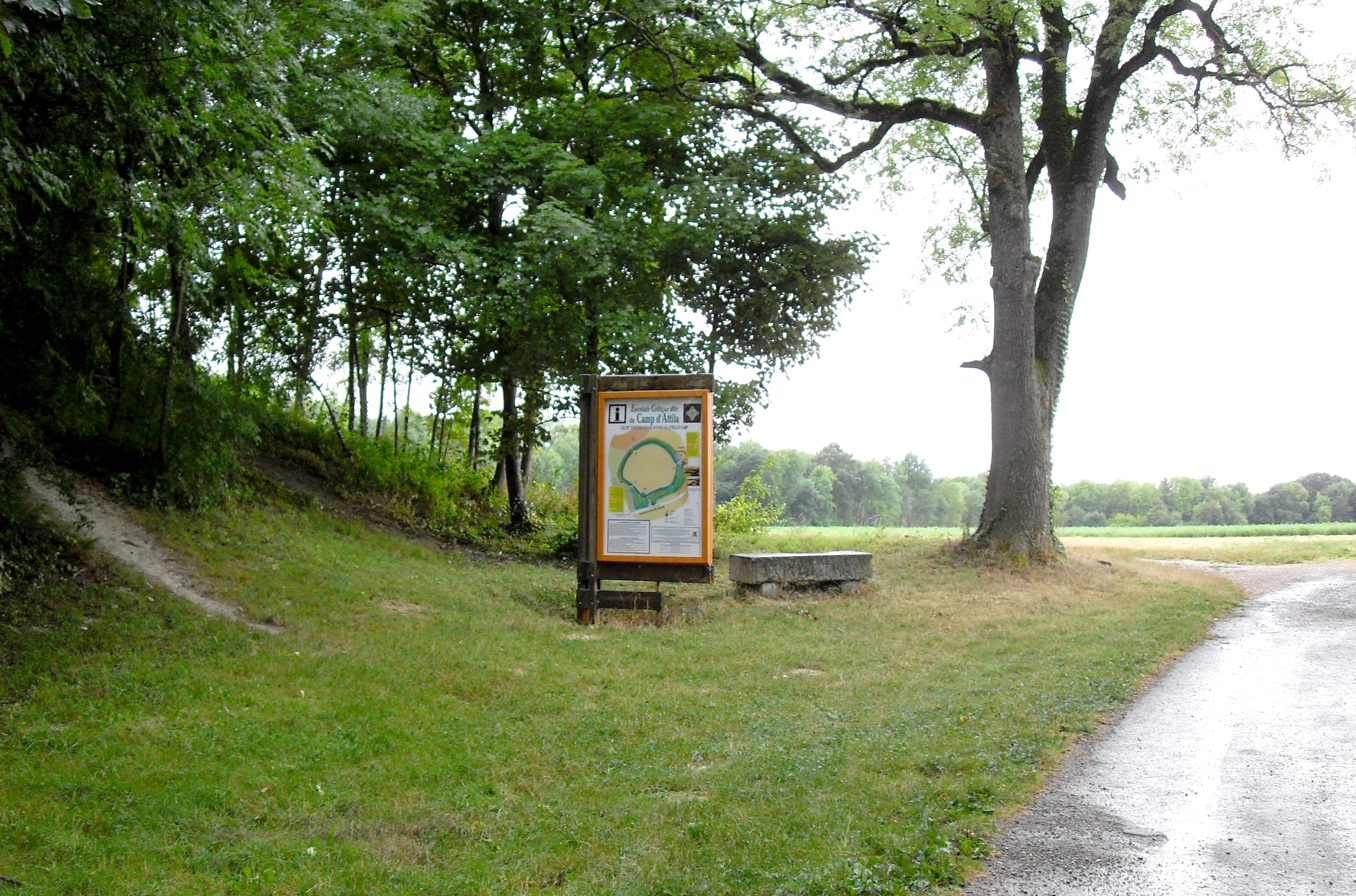
- Camp d'Attila (entrée principale à l'est)
- Location of La Cheppe
- Location within France Location within Grand Est
- Coordinates: 49°03′02″N 4°30′07″E
- Country: France
- Region: Grand Est
- Department: Marne
- Arrondissement: Châlons-en-Champagne
- Canton: Argonne Suippe et Vesle
- Intercommunality: Région de Suippes

Government
  - Mayor (2020–2026): Marcel Bonnet
- Area^{1}: 23.9 km^{2} (9.2 sq mi)
- Elevation: 133 m (436 ft)
- Population (2023): 322
  - Density: 13.5/km^{2} (34.9/sq mi)
- Time zone: UTC+01:00 (CET)
  - Summer (DST): UTC+02:00 (CEST)
- INSEE/Postal code: 51147 /51600
- ^{1} French Land Register data, which excludes lakes, ponds, glaciers > 1 km^{2} (0.386 sq mi or 247 acres) and river estuaries.

La Cheppe (French pronunciation: [la ʃɛp]) is a commune in the Marne department in the Grand Est region in north-eastern France. It is best known for being the place where Attila camped with his forces at the Battle of the Catalaunian Plains.

== See also ==
- Communes of the Marne department
