= The Phoenix (Lyfe Jennings album) =

Studio album by Lyfe Jennings
- Released: August 15, 2006
- Recorded: 2005–2006
- Genres: R&B; soul; gospel; rock
- Length: 62:29
- Labels: Columbia; Sony Urban
- Producer: Lyfe Jennings

Lyfe Jennings chronology
Lyfe 268-192 (2004)	The Phoenix (2006)	Lyfe Change (2008)

Singles from The Phoenix
- 1. "S.E.X." Released: August 1, 2006; 2. "Let's Stay Together" Released: 2006

The Phoenix is the second studio album from American singer and songwriter Lyfe Jennings. It was released on August 15, 2006, by Columbia Records and Sony Urban Music. Predominantly an R&B and soul record, it also incorporates elements of rock and gospel music, while it discusses themes, including street life, relationships, abstinence, and fame. The album includes guest appearances from Three 6 Mafia and LaLa Brown. The album's lead single, "S.E.X.", also attained commercial success, peaking within the top 10 of the US Hot R&B/Hip-Hop Songs chart.

Upon its release, The Phoenix received favorable reviews from music critics, who praised Jennings's vocals and songwriting. It debuted at number two on the US Billboard 200 and number one on the Top R&B/Hip-Hop Albums, with first-week sales of 136,000 copies, a significant improvement over first-week sales of his previous album. It ultimately ranked as one of the top-selling albums of both 2006 and 2007 on the R&B/Hip-Hop Albums chart, and was certified Gold for sales of over 500,000 copies in the United States.

== Composition ==
The Phoenix consists of genres including soul, R&B, gospel, and rock music. Most songs include explanatory interludes. The track "Keep Ya Head Up" is a cover of the Tupac song of the same name, which Billboard music critic Gail Mitchell described as "life-affirming". "Slow Down", which critic David Jeffries called "tougher than tough", samples the theme from Gilligan's Island in its chorus. "Radio" describes Jennings' experience of hearing his own music on the radio. "Ghetto Superman" and "Biggie Nigga" show Jennings's "street persona", while "Stingy" examines jealousy in a relationship, with lyrics including "I'm jealous of your clothes/'Cause they touch you more than I do". "S.E.X." advocates for sexual abstinence. "The River" incorporates elements of gospel music, while "Still Here" extensively incorporates strings and includes Three 6 Mafia as guest performers.

The album is named after Jennings's son. The title was also considered to connote fire and rebirth.

== Critical reception ==
Professional ratings
Review scores
Source	Rating
AllMusic	3.5/5 stars
Gigwise	10/10
USA Today	3.5/4 stars

On music review aggregate website Album of the Year, The Phoenix holds a score of 85 out of 100. In the August 19, 2006, edition of Billboard magazine, the album received a "spotlight" designation. In her review, Mitchell calling the album "equally strong" as his debut, praising Jennings's "rough-edged vocals" and concluding that "this urban griot is a talent to be reckoned with". Gigwise awarded the album 10 out of 10 stars, with critic Will Lavin calling the album "instrumentally immaculate and vocally faultless" and noting "S.E.X.", "Keep Ya Head Up", and "Radio" as highlights. Writing for AllMusic, which awarded the album three and a half stars out of five, Jeffries likened Jennings to Kanye West, John Legend, and 1970s soul artists, and expressed surprise that Sony allowed it to be released. Jeffries criticized the interludes but argued that the record has "giant flaws, and grand swoops of unbridled creativity".

== Commercial performance ==
In its first week, The Phoenix sold 136,000 copies, debuting at number two on the Billboard 200. It was held off the top spot of the Billboard 200 by Christina Aguilera's Back to Basics, which sold 342,000 copies in its first week. The album also topped the R&B/Hip-Hop Albums chart in its first week. On the year-end Billboard 200 chart for 2006, the album placed at number 173, also placing at number 40 on the year-end R&B/Hip-Hop chart. On the 2007 year-end R&B/Hip-Hop Albums chart, it ranked number 94. On December 11, 2006, under four months after its release, the album was awarded a Gold certification by the Recording Industry Association of America for sales of over 500,000 copies in the United States.

Its opening sales week was substantially more successful than that of Lyfe 268-192. In contrast with The Phoenix, Jennings's debut had failed to enter the Billboard 200 in the first four weeks following its release, eventually debuting at number 193 in October 2004. Billboard attributed the album's relatively strong sales to the popularity of lead single "S.E.X.", which ranked at number 10 on the Hot R&B/Hip-Hop Songs chart the week that the album debuted.

== Track listing ==
#	Title	Featured guest(s)	Time
1	"Intro"		0:55
2	"Interlude"		0:21
3	"Slow Down"	Young Buck, Doc Black	3:45
4	"Interlude"		0:18
5	"Goodbye"		5:05
6	"Interlude"		0:23
7	"Let's Stay Together"		4:35
8	"Interlude"		0:27
9	"Biggie Nigga"		2:41
10	"Interlude"		0:26
11	"Ghetto Superman"		4:21
12	"Interlude"		0:28
13	"S.E.X."	LaLa Brown	3:18
14	"Interlude"		0:25
15	"Down Here, Up There"		3:13
16	"Interlude"		0:30
17	"The River"		3:13
18	"Interlude"		0:20
19	"Still Here"	Three 6 Mafia, Project Pat	4:47
20	"Interlude"		0:27
21	"More Than a Girl"		4:17
22	"Interlude"		0:26
23	"Stingy"		4:12
24	"Interlude"		0:22
25	"Radio"		3:35
26	"Interlude"		0:59
27	"Keep Ya Head Up"		3:46
28	"I'll Always Love You"		4:54

== Charts ==
=== Weekly charts ===
Chart (2006)	Peak position
US Billboard 200	2
US Top R&B/Hip-Hop Albums (Billboard)	1

=== Year-end charts ===
Chart (2006)	Position
US Billboard 200	173
US Top R&B/Hip-Hop Albums (Billboard)	40
Chart (2007)	Position
US Top R&B/Hip-Hop Albums (Billboard)	94

== Certifications ==
Region	Certification	Certified units/sales
United States (RIAA)	Gold	500,000^{^}
^{^} Shipments figures based on certification alone.
