= Busy (Lyfe Jennings song) =

Single by Lyfe Jennings featuring Tyga & Young Buck

from the album I Still Believe
- Released: February 23, 2010
- Recorded: 2009
- Genre: R&B
- Length: 2:53
- Label: Songbook/CBE Entertainment Records/Asylum/Warner Bros. Records
- Songwriter(s): Tyler James Williams
- Producer(s): Lyfe Jennings

Lyfe Jennings featuring Tyga & Young Buck singles chronology
"If I Knew Then" (2009)	"Busy" (2010)	"Statistics" (2010)

"Busy" is the first single released from Lyfe Jennings' fourth album I Still Believe on February 23, 2010. Busy reached number 39 on the Billboard R&B/hip hop chart.
