= Statistics (song) =

Single by Lyfe Jennings

from the album I Still Believe
- Released: June 22, 2010
- Recorded: 2009
- Genre: R&B
- Length: 3:23
- Label: Songbook/CBE/Asylum/Warner Bros.
- Songwriters: C.J. Jennings, C.J. Harris
- Producer: T-Minus

Lyfe Jennings singles chronology
"Busy" (2009)	"Statistics" (2010)

"Statistics" is an R&B/soul song performed and released by Chester Lyfe Jennings who also co-wrote the song with Tyler Williams. Released in 2010, it was the first track on the artists, self-proclaimed, fourth and final album,I Still Believe. On June 22, 2010, “Statistics,” was released as a single where it reached 19 on the Billboard R&B/Hip-Hop songs list on September 4, 2010.

The song was inspired by Steve Harvey’s book, "Act Like a Lady, Think Like a Man:What Men Really Think About Love, Relationships, Intimacy, and Commitment," and belts out statistics such as,

"25% of all men are unstable,
25% of all men can't be faithful
30% of them don't mean what they say
And 10% of the remaining 20 is gay
That leaves you a 10% chance of ever finding your man"

This is sung to a “lullaby-like piano melody”. The song also offers advice on keeping that good one, once he is found.

"Tell him that you're celibate
And if he wants some of your goodies he gon' have to work for it"

== Promotion ==
"Lyfe" interviewed with Mo'Nique of "The "Mo'Nique" show. The show aired on the network BET in June 2010. Following the interview on his career and his personal life, "Lyfe" performed the song "Statistics".

"Essence" magazine was allowed a behind the scenes interview and rights to release the music video for "Statistics" on their website "Essence.com"

"Lyfe" sat down for a "round table" interview with the R&B lifestyle magazine "SingersRoom". During the interview, he discussed "unstable" and "cheating" men, as well as "Statistics" and his reason for writing the song. The interview debuted on the SingersRoom website in August 2010.

== Music video ==
Jennings premiered the “Statistics” video on the internet as part of an interview for Essence Magazine. The exclusive, début, was uploaded on July 13, 2010 on the essence.com website. It was released for sale on July 28, 2010. There are two different videos. Both versions are similar and include an opening scene of a close up of the face of Jennings singing in the parlando style, the words:

“Alright, alright, alright
y’all settle down settle down settle down.
If you don't know where you are this is Statistics 101
and I’m your teacher Lyfe Jennings in the flesh baby.
Books out, let’s go.”.

The second version includes an introduction, which feature eleven women talking about their prior abusive or unhealthy relationships. This introduction is the only deviation in the two videos.

== Charts ==
=== Weekly charts ===
Chart (2010)	Peak position
US Bubbling Under Hot 100 (Billboard)	6
US Hot R&B/Hip-Hop Songs (Billboard)	19

=== Year-end charts ===
Chart (2010)	Position
US Hot R&B/Hip-Hop Songs (Billboard)	62
