= Lyfe Change =

Studio album by Lyfe Jennings
- Released: April 29, 2008
- Recorded: 2007–2008
- Genres: R&B; soul; hip hop
- Length: 51:34
- Label: Sony Urban Music/Columbia/Music World Entertainment
- Producers: Chester "Lyfe" Jennings (exec. producer), Joy Bounds (exec. producer)

Lyfe Jennings chronology
The Phoenix (2006)	Lyfe Change (2008)	I Still Believe (2010)

Singles from Lyfe Change
- 1. "Cops Up" Released: 2007; 2. "Never Never Land" Released: April 15, 2008

Professional ratings
Review scores
Source	Rating
About.com	3.5/5 stars
Allmusic	3/5 stars
DJBooth	4.5/5 stars
Okayplayer	(85/100)
USA Today	3/4 stars

Lyfe Change is the third studio album by Lyfe Jennings, released on April 29, 2008.

"The album is called Lyfe Change because I'm changing it up a bit," explains Lyfe. "In the past I didn't work with different producers, I produced and wrote most of my albums by myself. But on this project I actually worked with different producers and a few writers."

The first single off the album is called "Cops Up". It peaked at number 68 on Billboard Hot R&B/Hip-Hop Songs. The song was originally written for R&B duo, Luke & Q.

The second single is called "Never Never Land". It peaked at number 21 on Billboard Hot R&B/Hip-Hop Songs.

The third single has been released and is called "Will I Ever".

Lyfe Change debuted at number four on the U.S. Billboard 200 chart, selling about 80,000 copies in its opening week.

In the limited edition of the CD came with a DVD featuring a Live Performance in an Ohio Prison and the "Cops Up" music video. The DVD is edited in both versions.

== Track listing ==
1. "Change the Game" (Intro) (featuring Walter Butch) - 1:33
2. "Keep On Dreaming" - 3:40
3. "Warriors" - 3:10
4. "Never Never Land" - 3:58
5. "Brand New" (featuring T.I.) - 3:10
6. "It's Real" - 3:10
7. "Cops Up" - 3:33
8. "You Think You Got It Bad" (featuring Wyclef Jean) - 4:18
9. "Wild, Wild, Wild" - 3:23
10. "Midnight Train" - 3:18
11. "Hmmm" - 3:41
12. "Old School" (featuring Snoop Dogg) - 4:13
13. "Us" (Interlude) - 1:17
14. "Will I Ever" - 4:51
15. "Baby I'm a Star" - 4:19

- Lil Wayne appeared on the original version of "Brand New" but was later re-recorded and Lyfe Jennings replaced him with T.I. for the album version. The original still exists and can be heard on YouTube.

== Personnel ==
- A&R – Chad Elliott, Lyfe Jennings
- Art Direction – SLANG Inc.
- Coordinator [A&R Operations] – Juli Knapp
- Engineer [Assistant] – Elvis Aponte (tracks: 8), Mike Tschupp (tracks: 4, 14), Travis Stefl (tracks: 16, 17), Wilner Alexander (tracks: 8)
- Executive-Producer – Joy Bounds, Chester "Lyfe" Jennings
- Mastered By – Dave Kutch (tracks: 1 to 17), Mitsuyasu Abe (tracks: 18)
- Management – Joy Bounds, Know Joy Entertainment, LLC, Mathew Knowles, Music World Entertainment, Inc.
- Mixed By – Mitsuyasu Kaneko (tracks: 18), Rich Keller (tracks: 1 to 17)
- Mixed By [Assistant] – Travis Stefl (tracks: 1 to 8, 10, 12, 13, 15)
- Photography By – Roger Erickson
- Recorded By – Aaron Renner (tracks: 11), "Super" Dave Clauss (tracks: 9), Lyfe Jennings (tracks: 1, 12, 15), Mike Cardenas (tracks: 12), Mike Tschupp (tracks: 7), Mitsuyasu Kaneko (tracks: 18), Rich Keller (tracks: 3 to 6, 8 to 10, 13, 14, 16, 17), Riley Mackin (tracks: 11), Wyatt Oates (tracks: 2)
- Recorded By [Assistant] – Mike Tschupp (tracks: 3, 5, 6, 10, 13), Ryan Hobbs (tracks: 2)

Production

1. Lyfe Jennings - Tracks 1,2,3,4,5,6,8,14,15
2. The Underdogs - Tracks 7,10,11
3. Steven Russell - Tracks 10,11
4. Wyclef Jean - Tracks 8,9
5. Jerry Wonda Duplessis - Track 8
6. Logic - Track 9
7. Luke & Q - Track 7

== Charts ==
=== Weekly charts ===
Chart (2008)	Peak position
US Billboard 200	4
US Top R&B/Hip-Hop Albums (Billboard)	1

=== Year-end charts ===
Chart (2008)	Position
US Billboard 200	183
US Top R&B/Hip-Hop Albums (Billboard)	36
