= Bussy-le-Repos, Marne =

Bussy-le-Repos
- Commune
- Location of Bussy-le-Repos
- Location within France Location within Grand Est
- Coordinates: 48°53′59″N 4°45′34″E
- Country: France
- Region: Grand Est
- Department: Marne
- Arrondissement: Vitry-le-François
- Canton: Sermaize-les-Bains
- Intercommunality: Côtes de Champagne et Val de Saulx

Government
  - Mayor (2020–2026): Claude Guichon
- Area^{1}: 22.64 km^{2} (8.74 sq mi)
- Population (2023): 135
  - Density: 5.96/km^{2} (15.4/sq mi)
- Time zone: UTC+01:00 (CET)
  - Summer (DST): UTC+02:00 (CEST)
- INSEE/Postal code: 51098 /51330
- ^{1} French Land Register data, which excludes lakes, ponds, glaciers > 1 km^{2} (0.386 sq mi or 247 acres) and river estuaries.

Bussy-le-Repos (French pronunciation: [bysi lə ʁəpo]) is a commune in the Marne department in northeastern France.

== Population ==
Historical population
Year	Pop.	±% p.a.
1968	143	—
1975	113	−3.31%
1982	99	−1.87%
1990	128	+3.26%
1999	106	−2.07%
2007	114	+0.91%
2012	140	+4.19%
2017	135	−0.72%
2023	135	+0.00%
Source: INSEE

== See also ==
- Communes of the Marne department
