= Lyfe 268-192 =

Lyfe 268‒192

Studio album by Lyfe Jennings
- Released: August 17, 2004 (original release); December 13, 2005 (re-release)
- Length: 54:13
- Label: Columbia; Sony Urban
- Producer: Lyfe Jennings

Lyfe Jennings chronology
Lyfe 268‒192 (2004)	The Phoenix (2006)

Singles from Lyfe 268‒192
- 1. "Stick Up Kid" Released: 2004; 2. "Must Be Nice" Released: August 2, 2004; 3. "Hypothetically" Released: September 27, 2005

Lyfe 268‒192 is the debut studio album by American singer and songwriter Lyfe Jennings. It was released on August 17, 2004, by Columbia Records. The album's title contains the numbers "268–192", the identification number of which he was given, while he was incarcerated. To date, the album has sold at least one million copies in the United States.

== Release ==
Lyfe Jennings performing "Cry" live at Howard Theatre.

In July 2005, Columbia re-released the album in a DualDisc format, featuring a live footage and a documentary on a day in the life of Lyfe Jennings. In November 2005, it was reported that the label were planning a "fan pack" edition of the album for the December 2005 release, including a new version of "Hypothetically" featuring Fantasia; as well as live footage from Jennings's July 2005's House of Blues performance and music videos for "Stick Up Kid", "Must Be Nice", and "Hypothetically".

== Critical reception ==
Professional ratings
Review scores
Source	Rating
AllMusic	4/5 stars

Upon its release, the album received critical acclaim. AllMusic editor David Jeffries fround that "a couple tracks" on Lyfe 268‒192 "refuse to get to the point and too much narration gives sections of the album the repeat listening appeal of an audio book. It could have been tighter and more approachable, but few debuts hold this much promise."

== Commercial performance ==
In its thirty-fifth week on the US Top R&B/Hip-Hop Albums chart, dated April 30, 2005, Lyfe 268‒192 rose from number 14 to number 10, officially breaking the top 10 for the first time. In a profile of Jennings in their November 19, 2005's issue, Billboard reported that the album's sales stood at 763,000 copies in the United States.

== Track listing ==
All tracks written and produced by Lyfe Jennings, except where noted.

No.	Title	Length
1.	"Intro"	0:05
2.	"Interlude"	0:14
3.	"Must Be Nice"	3:53
4.	"The Way I Feel About You"	3:33
5.	"She Got Kids"	4:05
6.	"I Can't"	3:57
7.	"Hypothetically" (featuring Erin)	3:45
8.	"Smile" (writers: Jennings, Brian Potter, Dennis Lambert)	4:06
9.	"Greedy"	3:21
10.	"Stick Up Kid"	4:09
11.	"Cry"	4:11
12.	"26 Years, 17 Days" (writers: Jennings, Eugene Curry, Walter Sigler)	4:11
13.	"Made Up My Mind"	3:30
14.	"My Life"	4:25
15.	"Let's Do This Right"	6:45

Special Edition (bonus tracks)
No.	Title	Length
16.	"Must Be Nice (Remix)" (featuring Nas)
17.	"Hypothetically (Remix)" (featuring Fantasia Barrino)

== Charts ==
=== Weekly charts ===
Weekly chart performance for Lyfe 268‒192
Chart (2005)	Peak position
US Billboard 200	39
US Top R&B/Hip-Hop Albums (Billboard)	7

=== Year-end charts ===
Year-end chart performance for Lyfe 268‒192
Chart (2005)	Position
US Billboard 200	91
US Top R&B/Hip-Hop Albums (Billboard)	18
