= Bussy-le-Repos, Yonne =

Bussy-le-Repos
- Commune
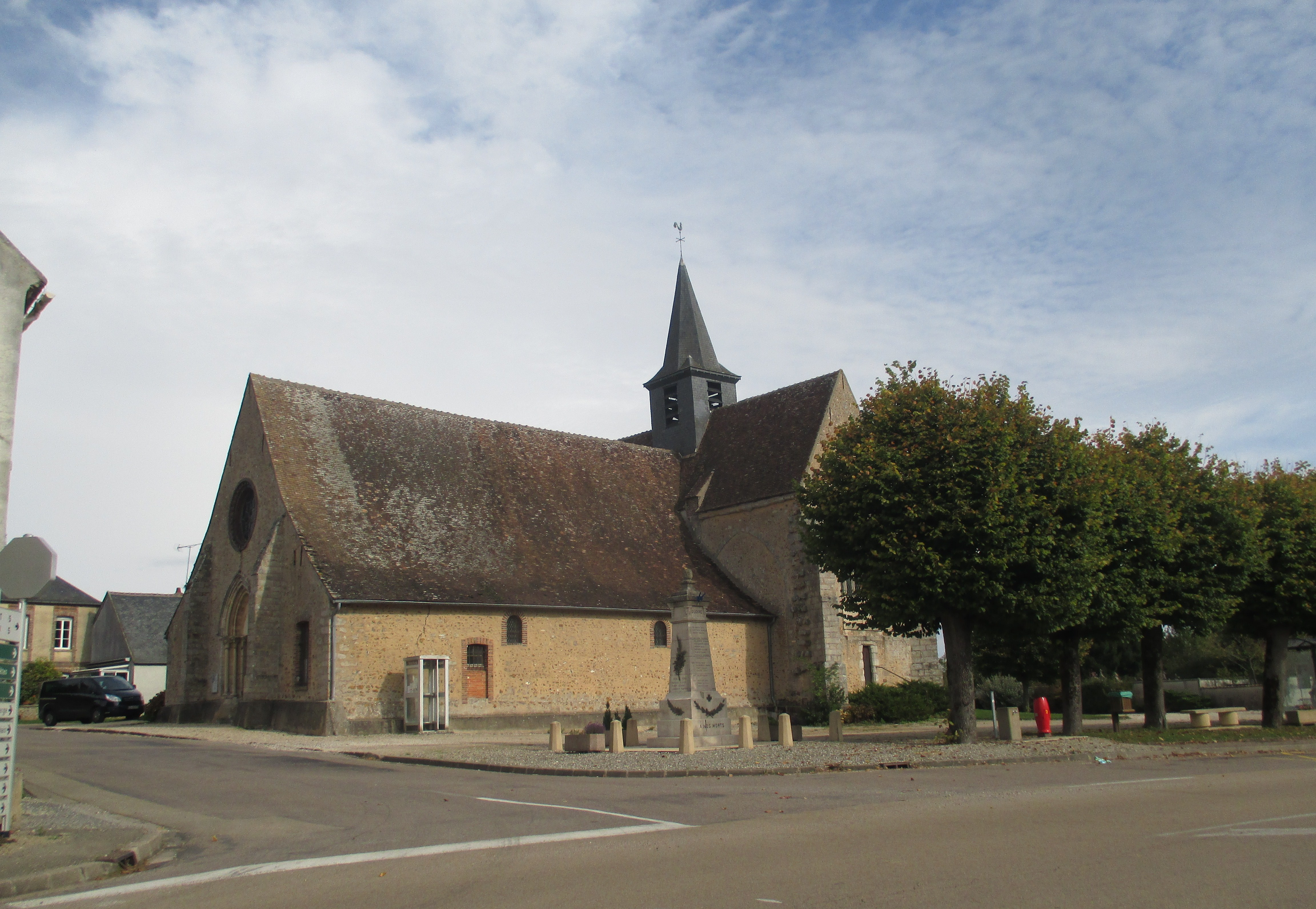
- The church in Bussy-le-Repos
- Location of Bussy-le-Repos
- Location within France Location within Bourgogne-Franche-Comté
- Coordinates: 48°03′27″N 3°13′58″E
- Country: France
- Region: Bourgogne-Franche-Comté
- Department: Yonne
- Arrondissement: Sens
- Canton: Villeneuve-sur-Yonne

Government
  - Mayor (2020–2026): Séverine Mazateau
- Area^{1}: 23.79 km^{2} (9.19 sq mi)
- Highest elevation: 192 m (630 ft)
- Lowest elevation: 94 m (308 ft)
- Population (2023): 453
  - Density: 19.0/km^{2} (49.3/sq mi)
- Time zone: UTC+01:00 (CET)
  - Summer (DST): UTC+02:00 (CEST)
- INSEE/Postal code: 89060 /89500
- ^{1} French Land Register data, which excludes lakes, ponds, glaciers > 1 km^{2} (0.386 sq mi or 247 acres) and river estuaries.

Bussy-le-Repos (French pronunciation: [bysi lə ʁəpo]) is a commune in the Yonne department in Bourgogne-Franche-Comté in north-central France.

== See also ==
- Communes of the Yonne department
