= Lyfe Jennings =

American singer-songwriter

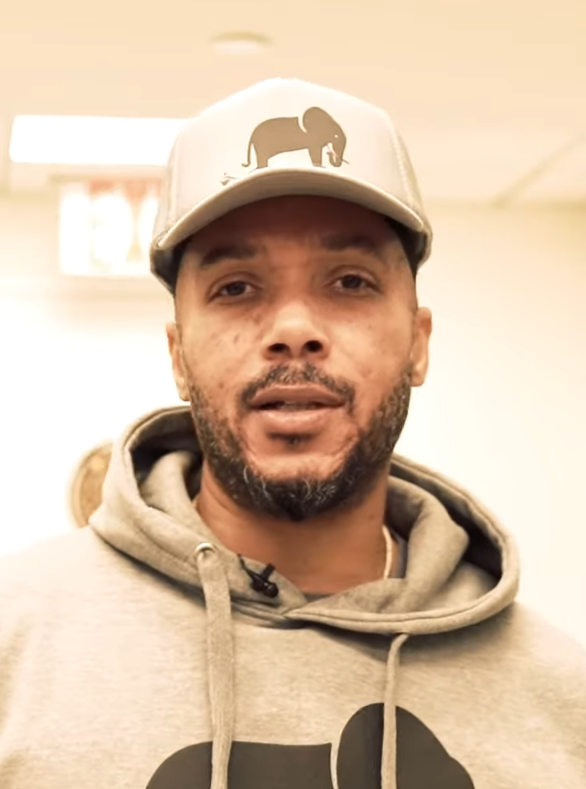
- Jennings in 2023

Background information
- Born: Chester Jermaine Jennings; June 3, 1978 (age 48)
- Origin: Toledo, Ohio, U.S.
- Genres: R&B; soul
- Occupations: Singer-songwriter; record producer; instrumentalist
- Instruments: Vocals; guitar; bass; piano
- Years active: 2002–present
- Labels: E1; Columbia/SME; RED; Warner; Asylum; Music World
- Spouse: Gwendolyn Scharkowski (m. 2016; div. 2017)

Chester Jermaine "Lyfe" Jennings (born June 3, 1978) is an American R&B and soul singer-songwriter, record producer, and instrumentalist. He plays the guitar, bass, and piano which he integrates into his music. The New York Times referred to him as a "socially minded R&B singer".

== Biography ==
Lyfe Jennings was born on June 3, 1978, in Toledo, Ohio, to a working-class family and was the middle of five kids. When he was a teenager, Jennings started to perform with his brother and two cousins. In the beginning of the 1990s the group disbanded. During this time, Jennings began to get into legal trouble and his musical career came to a halt when he was sent to prison at the age of 14 for firebombing a house, killing a woman.

== Career ==
In October 2013, Jennings released Lucid. Tree of Lyfe, recorded primarily in his home studio, followed in June 2015. When asked about his current musical mindset, Jennings stated: "Everybody feels like they have to reinvent themselves. I don’t think you can reinvent the truth. It is what it is. I’m not focused on reinvention. I want to go deeper. This album reaffirms the reasons why people started loving this music in the first place."

== Personal life ==
Jennings was previously engaged to Joy Bounds, the mother of his two oldest children. In October 2008, Jennings, after arguing with Bounds, followed her to her family's house in Smyrna, Georgia. At the residence, he destroyed the door, fired shots in the street, and led police on a high-speed chase that ended when he crashed his 2005 Chevrolet Corvette. In September 2010, he was sentenced to three and a half years in prison after he pleaded guilty to multiple charges arising from the incident. On February 2, 2016, he married Gwendolyn Scharkowski, a German model. They have a son. On March 15, 2017, Gwendolyn filed for divorce.

== Discography ==
Jennings performing his song "Cry" at the Howard Theatre in 2014

Studio albums

- Lyfe 268‒192 (2004)
- The Phoenix (2006)
- Lyfe Change (2008)
- I Still Believe (2010)
- Lucid (2013)
- Tree of Lyfe (2015)
- 777 (2019)
