= Rick Ross discography =

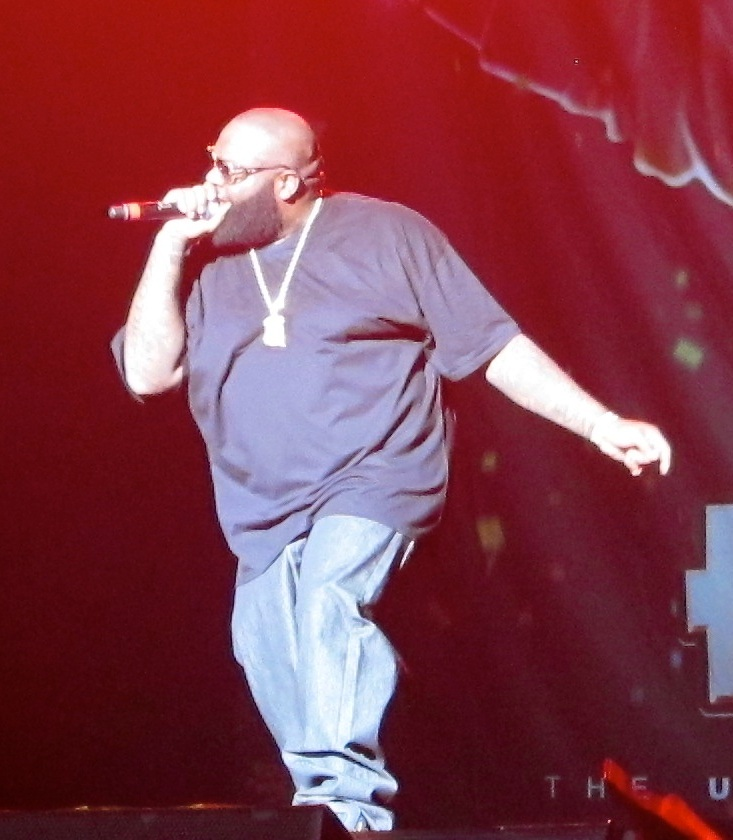
- Rick Ross performing in March 2011
- Studio albums: 12
- Extended plays: 1
- Soundtrack albums: 1
- Compilation albums: 1
- Singles: 145
- Music videos: 91
- Collaborative albums: 5
- Mixtapes: 6

The discography of Rick Ross, an American rapper, consists of twelve studio albums, five collaborative studio albums, one soundtrack, one compilation album, one extended play (EP), six mixtapes (including one collaborative mixtape), 145 singles (including 100 as a featured artist), and 91 music videos.

== Albums ==
=== Studio albums ===
List of studio albums, with selected chart positions and certifications
| Title | Album details | Peak chart positions | | | | | | Certifications |
| Title | Album details | US | US R&B | US Rap | CAN | FRA | UK | Certifications |
|---|---|---|---|---|---|---|---|---|
| Port of Miami | Released: August 8, 2006; Label: Poe Boy, Slip-n-Slide, Def Jam; Format: CD, LP, digital download | 1 | 1 | 1 | — | 165 | — | RIAA: Platinum |
| Trilla | Released: March 11, 2008; Label: Poe Boy, Slip-n-Slide, Def Jam; Format: CD, LP, digital download | 1 | 1 | 1 | 14 | — | — | RIAA: Gold |
| Deeper Than Rap | Released: April 21, 2009; Label: Maybach, Slip-n-Slide, Def Jam; Format: CD, LP, digital download | 1 | 1 | 1 | 23 | — | — | |
| Teflon Don | Released: July 20, 2010; Label: Maybach, Slip-n-Slide, Def Jam; Format: CD, LP, digital download | 2 | 2 | 2 | 17 | — | 169 | RIAA: Gold |
| God Forgives, I Don't | Released: July 31, 2012; Label: Maybach, Slip-n-Slide, Def Jam; Format: CD, LP, digital download | 1 | 1 | 1 | 1 | 29 | 8 | RIAA: Gold |
| Mastermind | Released: March 3, 2014; Label: Maybach, Slip-n-Slide, Def Jam; Format: CD, LP, digital download | 1 | 1 | 1 | 5 | 52 | 11 | |
| Hood Billionaire | Released: November 24, 2014; Label: Maybach, Slip-n-Slide, Def Jam; Format: CD, LP, digital download | 6 | 2 | 2 | — | 96 | 61 | |
| Black Market | Released: December 4, 2015; Label: Maybach, Def Jam; Format: CD, LP, digital download | 6 | 2 | 2 | 68 | — | — | |
| Rather You Than Me | Released: March 17, 2017; Label: Maybach, Epic; Format: CD, LP, digital download | 3 | 2 | 2 | 16 | 100 | 29 | |
| Port of Miami 2 | Released: August 9, 2019; Label: Maybach, Epic; Format: CD, LP, digital download | 2 | 1 | 1 | 8 | 78 | 18 | |
| Richer Than I Ever Been | Released: December 10, 2021; Label: Maybach, Epic; Format: CD, LP, digital download | 22 | 10 | 5 | 96 | — | — | |
| Set in Stone | Released: July 17, 2026; Label: Maybach, gamma.; Format: CD, LP, digital download | 39 | 12 | 8 | — | — | — (Note: Set in Stone did not enter the UK Albums Chart, but peaked at number 87 on the UK Album Downloads Chart.) | |
"—" denotes items that did not chart or were not released.

=== Collaborative albums ===
List of collaborative albums, with selected chart positions
| Title | Album details | Peak chart positions | | | |
| Title | Album details | US | US R&B | US Rap | CAN |
|---|---|---|---|---|---|
| Custom Cars & Cycles (with Triple C's) | Released: October 27, 2009; Label: Maybach, Def Jam; Format: CD, digital download | 44 | 5 | 2 | — |
| Self Made Vol. 1 (with Maybach Music Group) | Released: May 23, 2011; Label: Maybach, Warner Bros.; Format: CD, digital download | 5 | 1 | 1 | — |
| Self Made Vol. 2 (with Maybach Music Group) | Released: June 26, 2012; Label: Maybach, Warner Bros.; Format: CD, digital download | 4 | 1 | 1 | — |
| Self Made Vol. 3 (with Maybach Music Group) | Released: September 17, 2013; Label: Maybach, Atlantic; Format: CD, digital download | 4 | 1 | 1 | — |
| Too Good to Be True (with Meek Mill) | Released: November 10, 2023; Label: Maybach, gamma.; Format: Digital download | 23 | 7 | 5 | 71 |
"—" denotes a title that did not chart or was not released in that territory.

=== Compilation albums ===
List of compilation albums, with selected chart positions
| Title | Album details | Peak chart positions | | |
| Title | Album details | US | US R&B | US Rap |
|---|---|---|---|---|
| Rise to Power | Released: September 18, 2007; Label: Suave House; Format: CD, digital download | 62 | 6 | 6 |

=== Soundtrack albums ===
| Title | Album details |
|---|---|
| M.I. Yayo: The Movie | Released: March 25, 2008; Label: Maybach; Format: CD, digital download |

== Extended plays ==
| Title | EP details |
|---|---|
| The Albert Anastasia EP | Released: May 27, 2010; Label: Maybach; Format: Digital download |

== Mixtapes ==
| Title | Mixtape details |
|---|---|
| Ashes to Ashes | Released: December 24, 2010; Label: Maybach; Format: Digital download |
| Rich Forever | Released: January 6, 2012; Label: Maybach; Format: Digital download |
| The Black Bar Mitzvah | Released: October 8, 2012; Label: Maybach; Format: Digital download |
| The H: The Lost Album Vol. 1 (with Birdman) | Released: May 23, 2013; Label: Maybach, Cash Money; Format: Digital download |
| Black Dollar | Released: September 3, 2015; Label: Maybach; Format: Digital download |
| Renzel Remixes | Released: November 26, 2015; Label: Maybach; Format: Digital download |

== Singles ==
=== As lead artist ===
List of singles as lead artist, with selected chart positions and certifications, showing year released and album name
| Title | Year | Peak chart positions | | | | | | | | Certifications | Album |
| Title | Year | US | US R&B/HH | US Rap | CAN | FRA | GER | UK | UK R&B | Certifications | Album |
|---|---|---|---|---|---|---|---|---|---|---|---|
| "Hustlin'" | 2006 | 54 | 11 | 7 | — | — | — | — | — | RIAA: 2× Platinum | Port of Miami |
| "Push It" | 2006 | 57 | 15 | 10 | — | — | — | — | — | RIAA: Gold | Port of Miami |
| "Get That Bread" (featuring Big Duke and Cinque) | 2007 | — | — | — | — | — | — | — | — | | Rise to Power |
| "Speedin'" (featuring R. Kelly) | 2007 | — (Note: "Speedin'" did not enter the Billboard Hot 100, but peaked at number 21 on the Bubbling Under Hot 100 chart.) | 53 | — | — | — | — | — | — | | Trilla |
| "The Boss" (featuring T-Pain) | 2008 | 17 | 5 | 2 | — | — | — | — | — | RIAA: Platinum | Trilla |
| "Here I Am" (featuring Nelly and Avery Storm) | 2008 | 41 | 9 | 5 | — | — | — | — | — | RIAA: Gold | Trilla |
| "Magnificent" (featuring John Legend) | 2009 | 62 | 7 | 5 | — | — | — | — | — | | Deeper Than Rap |
| "Maybach Music 2" (featuring Kanye West, T-Pain, and Lil Wayne) | 2009 | 92 | 54 | — | — | — | — | — | — | | Deeper Than Rap |
| "Go" (with Triple C's featuring Birdman) | 2009 | — | 85 | — | — | — | — | — | — | | Custom Cars & Cycles |
| "Super High" (featuring Ne-Yo) | 2010 | 100 | 19 | 13 | — | — | — | — | — | | Teflon Don |
| "B.M.F. (Blowin' Money Fast)" (featuring Styles P) | 2010 | 60 | 6 | 4 | — | — | — | — | — | RIAA: Platinum | Teflon Don |
| "Aston Martin Music" (featuring Drake and Chrisette Michele) | 2010 | 30 | 2 | 1 | — | — | — | — | — | RIAA: 3× Platinum | Teflon Don |
| "9 Piece" (Note: "9 Piece" with T.I. version release for mixtape Ashes to Ashes and re-release singles release with Lil Wayne) (featuring Lil Wayne or T.I.) | 2011 | 61 | 32 | 18 | — | — | — | — | — | RIAA: Gold | Ashes to Ashes |
| "You the Boss" (featuring Nicki Minaj) | 2011 | 62 | 5 | 10 | — | — | — | — | — | RIAA: Gold | Non-album singles |
| "I Love My Bitches" | 2011 | — | 72 | — | — | — | — | — | — | | Non-album singles |
| "Stay Schemin'" (featuring Drake and French Montana) | 2012 | 58 | 40 | 20 | — | — | — | — | — | RIAA: Platinum; BPI: Gold | Rich Forever |
| "Touch'N You" (featuring Usher) | 2012 | — (Note: "Touch'N You" did not enter the Billboard Hot 100, but peaked at number 2 on the Bubbling Under Hot 100 chart.) | 15 | 15 | — | — | — | — | — | | God Forgives, I Don't |
| "Diced Pineapples" (featuring Wale and Drake) | 2012 | 71 | 16 | 14 | — | — | — | — | — | RIAA: Platinum | God Forgives, I Don't |
| "100 Black Coffins" | 2013 | — | — | — | — | 69 | 100 | — | — | | Django Unchained |
| "Box Chevy" | 2013 | — | — | — | — | — | — | — | — | | Non-album singles |
| "Oil Money Gang" (featuring Jadakiss) | 2013 | — | — | — | — | — | — | — | — | | Non-album singles |
| "No Games" (featuring Future) | 2013 | — | 49 | — | — | — | — | — | — | | Non-album singles |
| "The Devil Is a Lie" (featuring Jay-Z) | 2013 | 86 | 26 | 15 | — | — | — | 143 | 27 | RIAA: Gold | Mastermind |
| "War Ready" (featuring Jeezy) | 2014 | — | 49 | — | — | — | — | — | — | | Mastermind |
| "Thug Cry" (featuring Lil Wayne) | 2014 | — | 37 | 24 | — | — | — | 193 | 37 | RIAA: Gold | Mastermind |
| "Keep Doin' That (Rich Bitch)" (featuring R. Kelly) | 2014 | — | — | — | — | — | — | — | — | | Hood Billionaire |
| "If They Knew" (featuring K. Michelle) | 2014 | — | — | — | — | — | — | — | — | | Hood Billionaire |
| "Nickel Rock" (featuring Boosie Badazz) | 2014 | — | — | — | — | — | — | — | — | | Hood Billionaire |
| "Foreclosures" | 2015 | — | — | — | — | — | — | — | — | | Black Market |
| "Money Dance" (featuring The-Dream) | 2015 | — | — | — | — | — | — | — | — | | Black Market |
| "Peace Sign" | 2015 | — | — | — | — | — | — | — | — | | Black Market |
| "Sorry" (featuring Chris Brown) | 2015 | 97 | 32 | 25 | — | — | — | — | — | RIAA: Gold | Black Market |
| "Make It Work" (with Wale and Meek Mill) | 2016 | — | — | — | — | — | — | — | — | | Non-album single |
| "Purple Lamborghini" (with Skrillex) | 2016 | 33 | — | 7 | 28 | 58 | 85 | — | — | RIAA: Platinum; BPI: Silver | Suicide Squad: The Album |
| "Buy Back the Block" (featuring 2 Chainz and Gucci Mane) | 2016 | — | — | — | — | — | — | — | — | | Non-album single |
| "I Think She Like Me" (featuring Ty Dolla Sign) | 2017 | — (Note: "I Think She Like Me" did not enter the Billboard Hot 100, but peaked at number 13 on the Bubbling Under Hot 100 chart.) | — (Note: "I Think She Like Me" did not enter the Billboard Hot R&B/Hip-Hop Songs chart, but peaked at number five on the Bubbling Under R&B/Hip-Hop Singles chart.) | — | — | — | — | — | — | | Rather You Than Me |
| "Trap Trap Trap" (featuring Young Thug and Wale) | 2017 | 97 | — (Note: "Trap Trap Trap" did not enter the Billboard Hot R&B/Hip-Hop Songs chart, but peaked at number one on the Bubbling Under R&B/Hip-Hop Singles chart.) | — | — | — | — | — | — | | Rather You Than Me |
| "Florida Boy" (featuring T-Pain and Kodak Black) | 2018 | — | — | — | — | — | — | — | — | | Non-album singles |
| "Green Gucci Suit" (featuring Future) | 2018 | — | — | — | — | — | — | — | — | | Non-album singles |
| "Act a Fool" (featuring Wale) | 2019 | — (Note: "Act a Fool" did not enter the Billboard Hot 100, but peaked at number five on the Bubbling Under Hot 100 chart.) | 45 | — | — | — | — | — | — | | Port of Miami 2 |
| "Big Tyme" (featuring Swizz Beatz) | 2019 | — (Note: "Big Tyme" did not enter the Billboard Hot 100, but peaked at number 19 on the Bubbling Under Hot 100 chart.) | — | — | — | — | — | — | — | | Port of Miami 2 |
| "Gold Roses" (featuring Drake) | 2019 | 39 | 16 | 14 | 33 | — | — | 42 | — | RIAA: Platinum | Port of Miami 2 |
| "Gimme Brain" (with Travis Barker and Lil Wayne) | 2019 | — | — | — | — | — | — | — | — | | Non-album singles |
| "Entanglements" (with August Alsina) | 2020 | — | — | — | — | — | — | — | — | | Non-album singles |
| "Pinned to the Cross" (featuring Finn Matthews) | 2020 | — | — | — | — | — | — | — | — | | Non-album singles |
| "Outlawz" (featuring Jazmine Sullivan and 21 Savage) | 2021 | — (Note: "Outlawz" did not enter the Billboard Hot 100, but peaked at number 13 on the Bubbling Under Hot 100 chart.) | — | — | — | — | — | — | — | | Richer Than I Ever Been |
| "Little Havana" (featuring Willie Falcon and The-Dream) | 2021 | — | — | — | — | — | — | — | — | | Richer Than I Ever Been |
| "Shaq & Kobe" (with Meek Mill) | 2023 | 83 | 29 | 23 | — | — | — | — | — | | Too Good to Be True |
| "Champagne Moments" | 2024 | — | — | — | — | — | — | — | — | | Non-album singles |
| "For the Money" | 2025 | — | — | — | — | — | — | — | — | | Non-album singles |
| "Minks in Miami" (with French Montana and Max B) | 2026 | — (Note: "Minks in Miami" did not enter the Billboard Hot 100, but peaked at number 17 on the Bubbling Under Hot 100 chart.) | 41 | 20 | — | — | — | — | — | | Set in Stone |
"—" denotes a title that did not chart, or was not released in that territory.

=== As featured artist ===
List of singles as featured artist, with selected chart positions and certifications, showing year released and album name
| Title | Year | Peak chart positions | | | | | | Certifications | Album |
| Title | Year | US | US R&B/HH | US Rap | CAN | FRA | UK | Certifications | Album |
|---|---|---|---|---|---|---|---|---|---|
| "Told Ya'll" (Trina featuring Rick Ross) | 2002 | — | 64 | — | — | — | — | | Diamond Princess |
| "Holla at Me" (DJ Khaled featuring Lil Wayne, Paul Wall, Fat Joe, Rick Ross, and Pitbull) | 2006 | 59 | 24 | 15 | — | — | — | | Listennn... the Album |
| "Born-N-Raised" (DJ Khaled featuring Trick Daddy, Pitbull, and Rick Ross) | 2006 | — | 83 | — | — | — | — | | Listennn... the Album |
| "On Some Real Shit" (Daz Dillinger featuring Rick Ross) | 2006 | — | 90 | — | — | — | — | | So So Gangsta |
| "Chevy Ridin' High" (Dre featuring Rick Ross) | 2006 | — | 54 | — | — | — | — | | Non-album single |
| "Know What I'm Doin'" (Birdman and Lil Wayne featuring Rick Ross and T-Pain) | 2006 | — | 58 | 22 | — | — | — | | Like Father, Like Son |
| "We Takin' Over" (DJ Khaled featuring Akon, T.I., Rick Ross, Fat Joe, Birdman, and Lil Wayne) | 2007 | 28 | 26 | 11 | — | — | — | RIAA: Platinum | We the Best |
| "I'm So Hood" (DJ Khaled featuring T-Pain, Trick Daddy, Rick Ross, and Plies) | 2007 | 19 | 9 | 5 | — | — | — | RIAA: Platinum | We the Best |
| "100 Million" (Birdman featuring Young Jeezy, Rick Ross, and Lil Wayne) | 2007 | — | 69 | — | — | — | — | | 5 * Stunna |
| "Foolish (Remix)" (Shawty Lo featuring DJ Khaled, Birdman, Rick Ross, and Jim Jones) | 2008 | — | — | — | — | — | — | | Non-album single |
| "Lights Get Low" (Freeway featuring Dre and Rick Ross) | 2008 | — | — | — | — | — | — | | Free at Last |
| "Cash Flow" (Ace Hood featuring T-Pain and Rick Ross) | 2008 | — | 55 | — | — | — | — | | Gutta |
| "Out Here Grindin" (DJ Khaled featuring Akon, Rick Ross, Young Jeezy, Lil Boosie, Trick Daddy, Ace Hood, and Plies) | 2008 | 38 | 32 | 17 | 71 | — | — | RIAA: Gold | We Global |
| "You're Everything" (Bun B featuring 8Ball & MJG, Rick Ross, and David Banner) | 2008 | — | 59 | — | — | — | — | | II Trill |
| "Beam Me Up" (Tay Dizm featuring T-Pain and Rick Ross) | 2008 | — | 90 | — | — | — | — | | Non-album singles |
| "Curtain Call" (Nina Sky featuring Rick Ross) | 2008 | — | 79 | — | — | — | — | | Non-album singles |
| "Hustlin' Time" (Fuego featuring Rick Ross) | 2008 | — | — | — | — | — | — | | Chosen Few III: The Movie |
| "Welcome to the World" (Kevin Rudolf featuring Rick Ross) | 2009 | 58 | — | — | 56 | — | — | RIAA: Gold | In the City |
| "What It Is" (Gorilla Zoe featuring Rick Ross and Kollosus) | 2009 | — | 100 | — | — | — | — | | Don't Feed da Animals |
| "Sun Come Up" (Glasses Malone featuring T-Pain, Rick Ross, and Birdman) | 2009 | — | 94 | — | — | — | — | | Beach Cruiser |
| "Champion" (Ace Hood featuring Rick Ross and Jazmine Sullivan) | 2009 | — | 58 | — | — | — | — | | Ruthless |
| "So Sharp" (Mack 10 featuring Jazze Pha, Rick Ross, and Lil Wayne) | 2009 | — | 80 | — | — | — | — | | Soft White |
| "Fed Up" (DJ Khaled featuring Usher, Drake, Young Jeezy, and Rick Ross) | 2009 | — | 45 | 22 | — | — | — | | Victory |
| "Give It To 'Em" (Akon featuring Rick Ross) | 2010 | — | — | — | — | — | — | | Non-album single |
| "Put Your Hands Up" (DJ Khaled featuring Young Jeezy, Rick Ross, and Plies) | 2010 | — | — | — | — | — | — | | Victory |
| "All I Do Is Win" (DJ Khaled featuring T-Pain, Ludacris, Snoop Dogg, and Rick Ross) | 2010 | 24 | 8 | 6 | 67 | — | — | RIAA: 3× Platinum; BPI: Gold | Victory |
| "Pullin' on Her Hair" (Marques Houston featuring Rick Ross) | 2010 | — | 64 | — | — | — | — | | Mattress Music |
| "Rap Song" (T-Pain featuring Rick Ross) | 2010 | 89 | 33 | — | — | — | — | | Non-album single |
| "Monster" (Kanye West featuring Jay-Z, Rick Ross, Bon Iver, and Nicki Minaj) | 2010 | 18 | 30 | 15 | 43 | — | — | RIAA: 2× Platinum; BPI: Gold | My Beautiful Dark Twisted Fantasy |
| "Swagger Right" (RichGirl featuring Rick Ross and Fabolous) | 2010 | — | 72 | — | — | — | — | | Non-album single |
| "Living Better Now" (Jamie Foxx featuring Rick Ross) | 2010 | — | 81 | — | — | — | — | | Best Night of My Life |
| "Welcome to My Hood" (DJ Khaled featuring Rick Ross, Plies, Lil Wayne, and T-Pain) | 2011 | 79 | 30 | 14 | — | — | — | | We the Best Forever |
| "John" (Lil Wayne featuring Rick Ross) | 2011 | 22 | 19 | 12 | — | — | — | RIAA: 2× Platinum | Tha Carter IV |
| "The Way You Love Me" (Keri Hilson featuring Rick Ross) | 2011 | — | — | — | — | — | — | | No Boys Allowed |
| "Break My Heart" (Estelle featuring Rick Ross) | 2011 | — | 33 | — | — | — | — | | All of Me |
| "Tupac Back" (Meek Mill featuring Rick Ross) | 2011 | — | 31 | 22 | — | — | — | | Self Made Vol. 1 |
| "I'm on One" (DJ Khaled featuring Drake, Rick Ross, and Lil Wayne) | 2011 | 10 | 1 | 1 | 67 | — | 78 | RIAA: Gold; BPI: Gold | We the Best Forever |
| "Ima Boss" (Meek Mill featuring Rick Ross) | 2011 | — | 20 | 17 | — | — | — | | Self Made Vol. 1 |
| "Bananaz" (Ray J featuring Rick Ross) | 2011 | — | 63 | — | — | — | — | | Raydiation 2 |
| "In da Box" (Sean Garrett featuring Rick Ross) | 2011 | — | 54 | — | — | — | — | | Non-album single |
| "That Way" (Wale featuring Jeremih and Rick Ross) | 2011 | 49 | 4 | 5 | — | — | — | RIAA: Gold | Self Made Vol. 1 |
| "Anything (To Find You)" (Monica featuring Rick Ross) | 2011 | — (Note: "Anything (To Find You)" did not enter the Billboard Hot 100, but peaked at No.19 on the Bubbling Under Hot 100 Singles chart.) | 25 | — | — | — | — | | New Life |
| "Fly Together" (Red Café featuring Ryan Leslie and Rick Ross) | 2011 | — | 44 | 22 | — | — | — | | ShakeDown |
| "Harsh" (Styles P featuring Rick Ross and Busta Rhymes) | 2011 | — | — (Note: "Harsh" did not enter the Hot R&B/Hip-Hop Songs chart, but peaked at No. 18 on the Bubbling Under R&B/Hip-Hop Singles chart.) | — | — | — | — | | Master of Ceremonies |
| "Power" (Juvenile featuring Rick Ross) | 2011 | — | — | — | — | — | — | | Rejuvenation |
| "Think Like a Man" (Jennifer Hudson and Ne-Yo featuring Rick Ross) | 2012 | 90 | 33 | — | — | — | — | | Think Like a Man OST |
| "Bag of Money" (Wale featuring Rick Ross, Meek Mill, and T-Pain) | 2012 | 64 | 2 | 3 | — | — | — | | Self Made Vol. 2 |
| "Take It to the Head" (DJ Khaled featuring Chris Brown, Rick Ross, Nicki Minaj, and Lil Wayne) | 2012 | 58 | 6 | 6 | — | — | — | | Kiss the Ring |
| "Why" (Mary J. Blige featuring Rick Ross) | 2012 | — | 30 | — | — | — | — | | My Life II... The Journey Continues (Act 1) |
| "Lemme See" (Usher featuring Rick Ross) | 2012 | 46 | 2 | — | — | 88 | 90 | | Looking 4 Myself |
| "Born Stunna" (Birdman featuring Rick Ross) | 2012 | — | 45 | 24 | — | — | — | | Non-album single |
| "Pop That" (French Montana featuring Rick Ross, Drake, and Lil Wayne) | 2012 | 36 | 2 | 2 | — | — | — | RIAA: 2× Platinum | Excuse My French |
| "Let's Talk" (Omarion featuring Rick Ross) | 2012 | — | 30 | — | — | — | — | | Self Made Vol. 2 |
| "I Wish You Would" (DJ Khaled featuring Kanye West and Rick Ross) | 2012 | 78 | 37 | 19 | — | — | — | | Kiss the Ring |
| "Do It All" (Joe Young featuring Rick Ross, Ca$his, Game, and K. Young) | 2012 | — | — | — | — | — | — | | Non-album single |
| "Grind 24" (Torch featuring Rick Ross) | 2012 | — | — | — | — | — | — | | U.F.O Vol 2 |
| "Beautiful Onyinye" (P-Square featuring Rick Ross) | 2012 | — | — | — | — | — | — | | The Invasion |
| "Triumphant (Get 'Em)" (Mariah Carey featuring Rick Ross and Meek Mill) | 2012 | — | 53 | — | — | 135 | — | | Non-album single |
| "I Am Your Leader" (Nicki Minaj featuring Rick Ross and Cam'ron) | 2012 | — | 71 | — | — | — | — | | Pink Friday: Roman Reloaded |
| "Marble Floors" (French Montana featuring Lil Wayne, Rick Ross, and 2 Chainz) | 2012 | — | — | — | — | — | — | | Excuse My French |
| "1.8.7" (Booba featuring Rick Ross) | 2012 | — | — | — | — | 158 | — | | Futur |
| "Dope" (Tyga featuring Rick Ross) | 2013 | 68 | 19 | 15 | — | — | — | RIAA: Gold | Hotel California |
| "Millions" (Pusha T featuring Rick Ross) | 2013 | — | 47 | — | — | — | — | | Wrath of Caine |
| "Bugatti" (Ace Hood featuring Future and Rick Ross) | 2013 | 33 | 9 | 8 | — | — | — | RIAA: Platinum | Trials & Tribulations |
| "About That Life" (DJ Kay Slay featuring Fabolous, T-Pain, Rick Ross, Nelly, and French Montana) | 2013 | — | — | — | — | — | — | | Non-album single |
| "Believe It" (Meek Mill featuring Rick Ross) | 2013 | — | 38 | — | — | — | — | | Dreams and Nightmares |
| "U.O.E.N.O." (Rocko featuring Future and Rick Ross) | 2013 | 20 | 5 | 4 | — | — | — | RIAA: Gold | Seeing Is Believing |
| "Who Do We Think We Are" (John Legend featuring Rick Ross) | 2013 | — | — | — | — | — | — | | Love in the Future |
| "No New Friends" (DJ Khaled featuring Drake, Rick Ross, and Lil Wayne) | 2013 | 37 | 9 | 8 | — | — | — | RIAA: Gold | Suffering from Success |
| "Poor Decisions" (Wale featuring Rick Ross and Lupe Fiasco) | 2013 | — | — | — | — | — | — | | Self Made Vol. 3 |
| "Mars" (Jay Sean featuring Rick Ross) | 2013 | — | — | — | — | — | — | | Neon |
| "I Wanna Be with You" (DJ Khaled featuring Future, Rick Ross, and Nicki Minaj) | 2013 | — | 30 | 22 | — | — | — | | Suffering from Success |
| "Fire" (Bun B featuring Rick Ross, 2 Chainz, and Serani) | 2013 | — | — | — | — | — | — | | Trill OG: The Epilogue |
| "I Got It" (Ashanti featuring Rick Ross) | 2013 | — | — | — | — | — | — | | BraveHeart |
| "Big Homie" (Puff Daddy featuring Rick Ross and French Montana) | 2014 | — | — | — | — | — | — | | MMM |
| "They Don't Love You No More" (DJ Khaled featuring Jay Z, Rick Ross, Meek Mill, and French Montana) | 2014 | — | 30 | 17 | — | — | — | | I Changed a Lot |
| "Off the Corner" (Meek Mill featuring Rick Ross) | 2014 | — | — | — | — | — | — | | Dreams Worth More Than Money |
| "Options" (Luke James featuring Rick Ross) | 2014 | — | — | — | — | — | — | | Luke James |
| "New Flame" (Chris Brown featuring Usher and Rick Ross) | 2014 | 27 | 6 | — | — | 75 | 10 | RIAA: 3× Platinum; BPI: Gold | X |
| "Vamonos" (YT Triz featuring Rick Ross and Lil Wayne) | 2015 | — | — | — | — | — | — | | Dysfunctional |
| "I Don't Give a Fuck" (Trae tha Truth featuring Rick Ross) | 2015 | — | — | — | — | — | — | | Tha Truth |
| "When You Feel This" (Stafford Brothers featuring Rick Ross and Jay Sean) | 2015 | — | — | — | — | — | — | | Non-album singles |
| "Babuli Jabulah" (100 Kila featuring Rick Ross) | 2016 | — | — | — | — | — | — | | Non-album singles |
| "Do You Mind" (DJ Khaled featuring Nicki Minaj, Chris Brown, August Alsina, Jeremih, Future, and Rick Ross) | 2016 | 27 | 9 | 7 | — | 162 | — | RIAA: 3× Platinum | Major Key |
| "I'm On 3.0" (Trae tha Truth featuring T.I., Dave East, Tee Grizzley, Royce da 5'9", Curren$y, DRAM, Snoop Dogg, Fabolous, Rick Ross, Chamillionaire, G-Eazy, Styles P, E-40, Mark Morrison, and Gary Clark, Jr.) | 2017 | — | — | — | — | — | — | | Tha Truth, Pt. 3 |
| "Big Dreams" (Fler featuring Rick Ross) | 2018 | — | — | — | — | — | — | | Flizzy |
| "We So Mob" (Angela Mazzanti featuring Rick Ross) | 2018 | — | — | — | — | — | — | | Non-album single |
| "Let Me Tell Ya" (Smif-n-Wessun featuring Rick Ross) | 2019 | — | — | — | — | — | — | | The All |
| "Money in the Grave" (Drake featuring Rick Ross) | 2019 | 7 | 3 | 2 | 5 | — | 13 | BPI: Platinum; RIAA: 6× Platinum | The Best in the World Pack |
| "Down Like That" (KSI featuring Rick Ross, Lil Baby, and S-X) | 2019 | — | — | — | 77 | — | 10 | BPI: Gold | Dissimulation |
| "Cut Em In" (Anderson .Paak featuring Rick Ross) | 2020 | — | — | — | — | — | — | | Madden NFL 21 |
| "Make Me Feel" (Skip Marley featuring Rick Ross and Ari Lennox) | 2020 | — | — | — | — | — | — | | Higher Place |
| "Run It" (DJ Snake featuring Rick Ross and Rich Brian) | 2021 | ― | ― | ― | ― | ― | ― | | Shang-Chi and the Legend of the Ten Rings |
| "Cocaine Spoon" (Belly featuring Rick Ross) | 2023 | ― | ― | ― | ― | ― | ― | | Mumble Rap 2 |
| "Saturday Night Special" (LL Cool J featuring Rick Ross & Fat Joe) | 2024 | ― | ― | ― | ― | ― | ― | | The Force |
"—" denotes releases that did not chart or were not released in that territory.

=== Promotional singles ===
List of promotional singles, with chart position, showing year released and album name
| Title | Year | Peak chart position | Album |
| Title | Year | US | Album |
|---|---|---|---|
| "I'm So Hood (Remix)" (DJ Khaled featuring Young Jeezy, Ludacris, Busta Rhymes, Big Boi, Lil Wayne, Fat Joe, Birdman, and Rick Ross) | 2007 | — | We the Best |
| "Mafia Music" | 2009 | — | Deeper Than Rap |
| "All I Really Want" (featuring The-Dream) | 2009 | — | Deeper Than Rap |
| "Lay Back" (featuring Robin Thicke) | 2009 | — | Deeper Than Rap |
| "Put It In da Air" (Papa Reu featuring Rick Ross) | 2010 | — | Non-album singles |
| "Choppa Choppa Down (Remix)" (French Montana featuring Rick Ross and Wiz Khalifa) | 2011 | — | Non-album singles |
| "Ima Boss (Remix)" (Meek Mill featuring DJ Khaled, T.I., Rick Ross, Lil Wayne, Birdman, and Swizz Beatz) | 2012 | 51 | Non-album singles |
| "Shot Caller (Remix)" (French Montana featuring Diddy, Rick Ross, and Charlie Rock) | 2012 | — | Non-album singles |
| "Born Stunna (Remix)" (Birdman featuring Rick Ross, Nicki Minaj, and Lil Wayne) | 2012 | — | Non-album singles |
| "Pour It Up (Remix)" (Rihanna featuring Young Jeezy, Rick Ross, Juicy J, and T.I.) | 2013 | — | Non-album singles |
| "Colombia (Remix)" (Young Scooter featuring Rick Ross, Gucci Mane, and Birdman) | 2013 | — | Non-album singles |
| "Ain't Worried About Nothin' (Remix)" (French Montana featuring Diddy, Rick Ross, and Snoop Dogg) | 2013 | — | Non-album singles |
| "Do What U Want (DJWS Remix)" (Lady Gaga featuring R. Kelly and Rick Ross) | 2013 | — | Non-album singles |
| "No Games (Remix)" (featuring Future, Meek Mill, and Wale) | 2013 | — | Non-album singles |
| "Elvis Presley Blvd." (featuring Project Pat) | 2014 | — | Hood Billionaire |
| "Glory of War" (featuring Anthony Hamilton) | 2017 | — | Non-album singles |
| "She on My Dick (Remix)" (featuring Meek Mill, Young Dolph, and Bruno Mali) | 2017 | — | Non-album singles |
| "Jumping Ship" | 2017 | — | Non-album singles |
| "TipToe'n" | 2017 | — | Non-album singles |
"—" denotes a recording that did not chart or was not released in that territory.

== Other charted and certified songs ==
List of songs, with selected chart positions, showing year released and album name
| Title | Year | Peak chart positions | | | | Certifications | Album |
| Title | Year | US | US R&B | US Rap | UK | Certifications | Album |
|---|---|---|---|---|---|---|---|
| "Blow" (featuring Dre) | 2006 | — | — (Note: "Blow" did not enter the Billboard Hot 100, but peaked at No.8 on the Bubbling Under Hot 100 Singles chart.) | — | — | | Port of Miami |
| "Yeah, Dat's Money" (Lil Ru featuring Rick Ross) | 2009 | — | 93 | — | — | | 21 & Up |
| "Live Fast, Die Young" (featuring Kanye West) | 2010 | — | 89 | — | — | | Teflon Don |
| "MC Hammer" (featuring Gucci Mane) | 2010 | — | 78 | — | — | | Teflon Don |
| "Devil in a New Dress" (Kanye West featuring Rick Ross) | 2010 | — | — | — | — | BPI: Silver; RIAA: 2× Platinum | My Beautiful Dark Twisted Fantasy |
| "John Doe" (with DJ Hotday) | 2011 | — | 99 | — | — | | Ashes to Ashes and Good in Any Hood |
| "Harder" (Yo Gotti featuring Rick Ross) | 2012 | — | — (Note: "Harder" did not enter the Hot R&B/Hip-Hop Songs chart, but peaked at No. 6 on the Bubbling Under R&B/Hip-Hop Singles chart.) | — | — | | Live from the Kitchen |
| "Ring Ring" (featuring Future) | 2012 | — | 88 | — | — | | Rich Forever |
| "So Sophisticated" (featuring Meek Mill) | 2012 | — | 82 | — | — | | God Forgives, I Don't |
| "3 Kings" (featuring Dr. Dre and Jay-Z) | 2012 | — | 60 | — | — | | God Forgives, I Don't |
| "Hold Me Back" | 2012 | — | 81 | — | — | | God Forgives, I Don't |
| "3hunna" (Chief Keef featuring Rick Ross) | 2012 | — | — (Note: "3hunna" did not enter the Hot R&B/Hip-Hop Songs chart, but peaked at No. 5 on the Bubbling Under R&B/Hip-Hop Singles chart.) | — | — | | Finally Rich |
| "FuckWithMeYouKnowIGotIt" (Jay-Z featuring Rick Ross) | 2013 | 64 | 24 | — | — | | Magna Carta Holy Grail |
| "Nobody" (Rick Ross featuring French Montana) | 2014 | — | 38 | 23 | — | | Mastermind |
| "In Vein" (Rick Ross featuring The Weeknd) | 2014 | — | 47 | — | 136 | | Mastermind |
| "Sanctified" (Rick Ross featuring Kanye West and Big Sean) | 2014 | 78 | 23 | 11 | 133 | | Mastermind |
| "Don't Shoot" (The Game featuring Rick Ross, 2 Chainz, Diddy, Fabolous, Wale, DJ Khaled, Swizz Beatz, Yo Gotti, Curren$y, Problem, King Pharoah, and TGT) | 2014 | — | 53 | — | — | | Non-album single |
| "Idols Become Rivals" (featuring Chris Rock) | 2017 | — (Note: "Idols Become Rivals" did not enter the Billboard Hot 100, but peaked at number two on the Bubbling Under Hot 100 Singles chart.) | — (Note: "Idols Become Rivals" did not enter the Billboard Hot R&B/Hip-Hop Songs chart, but peaked at number three on the Bubbling Under R&B/Hip-Hop Singles chart.) | — | — | | Rather You Than Me |
| "Apple of My Eye" (featuring Raphael Saadiq) | 2017 | — (Note: "Apple of My Eye" did not enter the Billboard Hot 100, but peaked at number 10 on the Bubbling Under Hot 100 Singles chart.) | — (Note: "Apple of My Eye" did not enter the Billboard Hot R&B/Hip-Hop Songs chart, but peaked at number four on the Bubbling Under R&B/Hip-Hop Singles chart.) | — | — | | Rather You Than Me |
| "Dead Presidents" (featuring Future, Jeezy, and Yo Gotti) | 2017 | — (Note: "Dead Presidents" did not enter the Billboard Hot 100, but peaked at number 22 on the Bubbling Under Hot 100 Singles chart.) | — (Note: "Dead Presidents" did not enter the Billboard Hot R&B/Hip-Hop Songs chart, but peaked at number seven on the Bubbling Under R&B/Hip-Hop Singles chart.) | — | — | | Rather You Than Me |
| "She on My Dick" (featuring Gucci Mane) | 2017 | — | — (Note: "She on My Dick" did not enter the Billboard Hot R&B/Hip-Hop Songs chart, but peaked at number 10 on the Bubbling Under R&B/Hip-Hop Singles chart.) | — | — | | Rather You Than Me |
| "Turnpike Ike" | 2019 | — (Note: "Turnpike Ike" did not enter the Billboard Hot 100, but peaked at number eight on the Bubbling Under Hot 100 chart.) | 49 | — | — | | Port of Miami 2 |
| "Nobody's Favorite" (featuring Gunplay) | 2019 | — (Note: "Nobody's Favorite" did not enter the Billboard Hot 100, but peaked at number 10 on the Bubbling Under Hot 100 chart.) | 50 | — | — | | Port of Miami 2 |
| "Summer Reign" (featuring Summer Walker) | 2019 | — (Note: "Summer Reign" did not enter the Billboard Hot 100, but peaked at number six on the Bubbling Under Hot 100 chart.) | 47 | — | — | | Port of Miami 2 |
| "Rich Nigga Lifestyle" (featuring Nipsey Hussle and Teyana Taylor) | 2019 | — (Note: "Rich Nigga Lifestyle" did not enter the Billboard Hot 100, but peaked at number 18 on the Bubbling Under Hot 100 chart.) | — | — | — | | Port of Miami 2 |
| "Running the Streets" (featuring A Boogie wit da Hoodie and Denzel Curry) | 2019 | — (Note: "Running the Streets" did not enter the Billboard Hot 100, but peaked at number 14 on the Bubbling Under Hot 100 chart.) | — | — | — | | Port of Miami 2 |
| "Lemon Pepper Freestyle" (Drake featuring Rick Ross) | 2021 | 3 | 3 | 3 | 6 | BPI: Silver | Scary Hours 2 |
| "This Is My Year" (DJ Khaled featuring A Boogie wit da Hoodie, Big Sean, Rick Ross, and Puff Daddy) | 2021 | — (Note: "This Is My Year" did not enter the Billboard Hot 100, but peaked at number 20 on the Bubbling Under Hot 100 chart.) | — | — | — | | Khaled Khaled |
| "Manslaughter" (Pop Smoke featuring The-Dream and Rick Ross) | 2021 | 82 | 33 | — | — | | Faith |
| "God Did" (DJ Khaled featuring Rick Ross, Lil Wayne, Jay-Z, John Legend, and Fridayy) | 2022 | 17 | 6 | 3 | 24 | RIAA: Gold | God Did |
| "Go to Hell" (with Meek Mill and Cool & Dre featuring Beam) | 2023 | — (Note: "Go to Hell" did not enter the Billboard Hot 100, but peaked at number 19 on the Bubbling Under Hot 100 chart.) | 39 | — | — | | Too Good to Be True |
| "Everyday Hustle" (with Future and Metro Boomin) | 2024 | 38 | 23 | 19 | — | | We Don't Trust You |
| "Living Large" (featuring BigXthaPlug) | 2026 | — | 47 | — | — | | Set in Stone |
"—" denotes a title that did not chart, or was not released in that territory.

== Guest appearances ==
List of non-single guest appearances, with other performing artists, showing year released and album name
| Title | Year | Other artist(s) | Album |
|---|---|---|---|
| "Ain't Shit to Discuss" | 2000 | Erick Onasis, Noah | Erick Onasis |
| "Told Y'all" | 2002 | Trina | All About the Benjamins |
| "Let Me Ride" | 2002 | Trick Daddy | Thug Holiday |
| "Bout Mine" | 2002 | Trick Daddy, Money Mark, Deuce Poppi, Mystic | Thug Holiday |
| "Get That Feeling" | 2002 | Trick Daddy | Thug Holiday |
| "Bitches & Bizness" | 2005 | Boyz n da Hood | Boyz n da Hood |
| "I Gotta" | 2005 | Trina | Glamorest Life |
| "Watch Out" | 2006 | DJ Khaled, Akon, Styles P, Fat Joe | Listennn... the Album |
| "Money Maker" | 2006 | Too Short, Pimp C | Blow the Whistle |
| "Promiscuous" (Remix) | 2006 | Nelly Furtado, Timbaland | none |
| "It's Okay (One Blood)" (Remix) | 2006 | The Game, Jim Jones, Snoop Dogg, Nas, T.I., Fat Joe, Lil Wayne, N.O.R.E., Jadakiss, Styles P, Fabolous, Juelz Santana, Twista, Kurupt, Daz Dillinger, WC, E-40, Bun B, Chamillionaire, Slim Thug, Young Dro, Clipse, Ja Rule, Junior Reid | none |
| "Tuck Ya Ice" (Remix) | 2006 | Trick Daddy, Plies | none |
| "I Get Money" | 2007 | Lil' Flip, Jim Jones | I Need Mine |
| "Intro (We the Best)" | 2007 | DJ Khaled | We the Best |
| "Brown Paper Bag" | 2007 | DJ Khaled, Young Jeezy, Dre, Juelz Santana, Lil Wayne, Fat Joe | We the Best |
| "Bitch I'm from Dade County" | 2007 | DJ Khaled, Trick Daddy, Trina, Brisco, Flo Rida, C-Ride, Dre | We the Best |
| "Flippin' That" | 2007 | N.O.R.E., Nina Sky | Cocaine on Steroids |
| "Cocaine" | 2007 | UGK | Underground Kingz |
| "I'm a Boss" | 2007 | Ice Water Inc., Raekwon | Polluted Water |
| "Brand New" | 2007 | Yung Joc, Snoop Dogg | Hustlenomics |
| "Paper" | 2007 | Boyz n da Hood | Back Up n da Chevy |
| "Feds Takin' Pictures" | 2007 | DJ Drama, Young Jeezy, Willie the Kid, Jim Jones, Young Buck, T.I. | Gangsta Grillz: The Album |
| "Roll on 'Em" | 2007 | Chingy | Hate it or Love It |
| "Birthday" | 2008 | Flo Rida | none |
| "Hoodtails" | 2008 | Bizzy Bone | none |
| "Hot Commodity" | 2008 | Trina | Still da Baddest |
| "Spotlight" (Remix) | 2008 | Jennifer Hudson | none |
| "Single Again" (Remix) | 2008 | Trina, Plies, Lil Wayne | none |
| "A Miracle" | 2008 | Webbie, Birdman | Savage Life 2 |
| "In the Ayer" (Remix) | 2008 | Flo Rida, Brisco | none |
| "Touch My Body" (Remix) | 2008 | Mariah Carey, The-Dream | none |
| "Ecstasy" | 2008 | Danity Kane | Welcome to the Dollhouse |
| "Died in Ya Arms" (Remix) | 2008 | Smitty, T-Pain, Junior Reid | none |
| "6 in the Morning" (Remix) | 2008 | Sean Garrett | Turbo 919 |
| "U Ain't Him" | 2008 | Nelly | Brass Knuckles |
| "Money Right" | 2008 | Flo Rida, Brisco | Mail on Sunday |
| "Straight Out the Rarri" | 2008 | Young Jeezy | none |
| "Southern Gangsta" | 2008 | Ludacris, Playaz Circle | Theater of the Mind |
| "Welcome to the World" | 2008 | Kevin Rudolf | In the City |
| "Durty South" | 2008 | Three 6 Mafia, Slim Thug, Busta Rhymes | none |
| "Go Ahead" | 2008 | DJ Khaled, Fabolous, Flo Rida, Fat Joe, Lloyd | We Global |
| "Bullet" | 2008 | DJ Khaled, Baby Cham | We Global |
| "Blood Money" | 2008 | DJ Khaled, Brisco, Ace Hood, Birdman | We Global |
| "Kick in the Door" | 2008 | DJ Khaled, Dela Candela | none |
| "Stop" | 2008 | DJ Pharris, Game, Sly Polaroid | none |
| "Arab Money" (Remix Pt. 2) | 2008 | Busta Rhymes, Ron Browz, Reek Da Villain, Spliff Star, N.O.R.E., Red Cafe | none |
| "Live Your Life" (Remix) | 2008 | T.I., Rihanna | none |
| "Get It Together" | 2009 | Masspike Miles | none |
| "Wrong Lover" | 2009 | J. Holiday | Round 2 |
| "Dope Boys" (Remix) | 2009 | Game, Antagonist | none |
| "Cause a Scene" (Remix) | 2009 | Teairra Mari, Flo Rida | none |
| "Yayo" | 2009 | Flo Rida, Brisco, Billy Blue, Ball Greezy, Red Eyezz, Bred, Pitbull, Ace Hood | R.O.O.T.S. |
| "I'm Fresh" | 2009 | DJ Drama, Mike Jones, Trick Daddy | Gangsta Grillz: The Album (Vol. 2) |
| "You Should've Killed Me" | 2009 | K. Michelle | Signed, Sealed, Delivered |
| "911" | 2009 | Shawty Lo, Bun B, Lyfe Jennings | Fright Night |
| "All About the Money" | 2009 | Gucci Mane | The State vs. Radric Davis |
| "On My Side" (Remix) | 2009 | D. Woods | none |
| "How Low" (Remix) | 2010 | Ludacris, Twista | Atlanta Ambassador |
| "Whitney & Bobby" | 2010 | Jay'Ton, Trae Tha Truth, Young Buck | |
| "Rude Boy" (Remix) | 2010 | Rihanna | |
| "Your Love" (Remix) | 2010 | Nicki Minaj | |
| "Not Like My Girl" | 2010 | Avery Storm | |
| "Window Seat" (Remix) | 2010 | Erykah Badu | |
| "Find Your Love" (Remix) | 2010 | Drake | |
| "All in One Swipe" | 2010 | Mack Maine, Birdman | |
| "Pullin' on Her Hair" | 2010 | Marques Houston | Mattress Music |
| "Maybe" (Remix) | 2010 | Rocko, Gucci Mane, Soulja Boy | none |
| "Suicide Doors" | 2010 | Slim Thug | none |
| "Pledge Allegiance" | 2010 | T.I. | No Mercy |
| "Down Here" | 2010 | Petey Pablo, Lil Wayne | none |
| "So in Love" | 2010 | Chrisette Michele | Let Freedom Reign |
| "Tangerine" (Remix) | 2010 | Big Boi, Fabolous, Bun B | none |
| "Living Better Now" | 2010 | Jamie Foxx | Best Night of My Life |
| "Just in Case" | 2010 | Rocko | Rocko Dinero |
| "Gucci Time" (Remix) | 2010 | Gucci Mane, Swizz Beatz | none |
| "Teenage Numbers" | 2010 | Yo Gotti | none |
| "Deuces" (Remix) | 2010 | Chris Brown, Drake, T.I., Kanye West, André 3000, Fabolous | none |
| "Looking for Love" (Remix) | 2010 | Diddy-Dirty Money, Usher | Last Train to Paris |
| "Dolla Signs" | 2010 | Three 6 Mafia | none |
| "How We Do It" | 2010 | Slim Thug | Tha Thug Show |
| "Freeze Me" (Remix) | 2010 | Young Dro, Yung L.A., Gucci Mane, T.I. | none |
| "Blockstars" (Remix) | 2010 | DJ Kay Slay, Busta Rhymes, Sheek Louch, Papoose, Cam'ron, Vado, Ray J | More Than Just a DJ |
| "Flip That Bitch A Few Times" | 2010 | Juicy J | Rubba Band Business |
| "Sex Appeal" | 2011 | Emmanuel Frayer | none |
| "Movie" | 2011 | Magazeen, DJ Nasty, DJ Khaled | none |
| "Stop" | 2011 | Game, DJ Khaled | none |
| "Let Me Do Me" | 2011 | Nawlage | none |
| "Faded" | 2011 | Red Cafe | Above The Cloudz |
| "Hustle Hard" (Remix) | 2011 | Ace Hood, Lil Wayne | Blood, Sweat & Tears |
| "Na Wut" | 2011 | Young Breed, Young Buck, Billy Blue | Project Prezident |
| "Tic Toc" (Remix) | 2011 | JC | none |
| "Your Love" (Music video) | 2011 | Diddy-Dirty Money, Trey Songz | Last Train to Paris |
| "Choppa Choppa Down" (Remix) | 2011 | French Montana, Gucci Mane, Wiz Khalifa | none |
| "I Am the Streets" | 2011 | Trae tha Truth, Lloyd, Game | Street King |
| "100 Keyz" | 2011 | Big Sean, Pusha T | Finally Famous |
| "Bottles & Rockin' J's" | 2011 | Game, Busta Rhymes, Fabolous, Lil Wayne, DJ Khaled | none |
| "Ugh" | 2011 | Yung Joc | none |
| "10 Summaz" | 2011 | 2 Chainz | none |
| "She Will" (Remix) | 2011 | Lil Wayne, Drake | none |
| "Dollar Signs" (Remix) | 2011 | Project Pat, Three 6 Mafia | Loud Pack |
| "Heavy Artillery" | 2011 | Game, Beanie Sigel | The R.E.D. Album |
| "Harsh" | 2011 | Styles P, Busta Rhymes | Master of Ceremonies |
| "Free Spirit" | 2011 | Drake | none |
| "Best Night Ever" | 2011 | Wale, Kevin Cossom | none |
| "Here For You" | 2011 | Wil Heart | none |
| "Bigger" | 2011 | Jordan King | none |
| "Tats On My Arm" | 2011 | Wale | none |
| "Ambition" | 2011 | Wale, Meek Mill | Ambition |
| "Money to Make" | 2011 | Birdman, Mack Maine | Billionaire Minds |
| "Lord Knows" | 2011 | Drake | Take Care |
| "Body 2 Body" (Remix) | 2011 | Ace Hood, Wale, Chris Brown, DJ Khaled | The Statement 2 |
| "Realest Livin'" | 2011 | Ace Hood | The Statement 2 |
| "Do Sumthin' Strange" | 2011 | Ludacris | 1.21 Gigawatts: Back to the First Time |
| "Pretty Down" | 2011 | Richie Wess, Lyaz | All Ears |
| "Deja Vu" | 2012 | Slim, Play-N-Skillz | none |
| "Lawyer Fees" (Remix) | 2012 | Scotty Boi, French Montana | none |
| "Harder" | 2012 | Yo Gotti | Live From The Kitchen |
| "Never Been Part II" | 2012 | Wiz Khalifa, Amber Rose | Taylor Allderdice |
| "Red Bottom Boss" | 2012 | Game | California Republic |
| "Now That I'm Paid" | 2012 | Game, Mele | California Republic |
| "Proud of That" | 2012 | Nipsey Hussle | none |
| "Trap Boomin'" | 2012 | Gucci Mane | I'm Up |
| "Stash House" | 2012 | Mysonne | The Definition Of A G 2 |
| "Til We Die" | 2012 | Busta Rhymes, Trey Songz | Year of the Dragon |
| "Don't Be Scared" | 2012 | Trey Songz | Chapter V |
| "Black Everything" | 2012 | Bleu DaVinci, Calico Jonez | The Davinci Code |
| "Real Niggas" | 2012 | Gunplay | 601 & Snort |
| "Clouds" | 2012 | DJ Drama, Miguel, Pusha T, Currensy | Quality Street Music |
| "Believe It" | 2012 | Meek Mill | Dreams and Nightmares |
| "Maybach Curtains" | 2012 | Meek Mill, Nas, John Legend | Dreams and Nightmares |
| "Lay Up" | 2012 | Meek Mill, Wale, Trey Songz | Dreams and Nightmares |
| "In the Name of Love (Do It All)" | 2012 | Cashis, Game, Joe Young, K-Young | The Art of Dying |
| "Cassette Deck" | 2012 | DJ Scream, Bun B, Slim Thug | Long Live the Hustle |
| "Head Shots" | 2012 | Gucci Mane | Trap God |
| "Instagram That Hoe" | 2012 | Fat Joe, Juicy J | none |
| "Respect Me" | 2012 | Gucci Mane | none |
| "Vultures" | 2012 | Torch | none |
| "I Ain't Got No Time" | 2012 | Ice Berg | Rise To Power |
| "Diamonds" | 2012 | French Montana, J. Cole | Mac & Cheese 3 |
| "Ali Bomaye" | 2012 | Game, 2 Chainz | Jesus Piece |
| "3Hunna" | 2012 | Chief Keef | Finally Rich |
| "1.8.7" | 2012 | Booba | Futur |
| "Small Change" | 2012 | MJG, Mr. Marr | Bitches Money Guns |
| "The Show" | 2012 | Wale, Aaron Wess | Folarin |
| "I'm a Coke Boy" (Remix) | 2013 | Chinx Drugz, French Montana, Diddy | Cocaine Riot 3 |
| "Soft" | 2013 | Juelz Santana, Fabolous, Meek Mill | God Will'n |
| "Millions" | 2013 | Pusha T | Wrath of Caine |
| "Life Long" | 2013 | Rockie Fresh, Nipsey Hussle | Electric Highway |
| "Haitian Niggas" | 2013 | Young Breed | Young Nigga Old Soul |
| "Choosin'" | 2013 | Currensy, Wiz Khalifa | New Jet City |
| "Hell Yeah" | 2013 | Stacy Barthe | P.S. I Love You |
| "U.O.E.N.O." | 2013 | Rocko, Future | Gift of Gab 2 |
| "Colombia" (Remix) | 2013 | Young Scooter, Gucci Mane, Birdman | none |
| "8 Figgaz" | 2013 | Bow Wow | Greenlight 5 |
| "Cypher" | 2013 | HS87, Casey Veggies, Schoolboy Q, Xzibit, Method Man, Redman, Raekwon | All I've Ever Dreamed Of |
| "HNIC" | 2013 | Master P, T-Pain, Bay Bay | Boss of All Bosses |
| "M.I.A." (Remix) | 2013 | Omarion, French Montana, Rockie Fresh | none |
| "Numb" | 2013 | Cassie | RockaByeBaby |
| "National Champs" | 2013 | DJ Scream | The Ratchet Superior |
| "Panera Bread" | 2013 | Rockie Fresh, Lunice | The Birthday Tape |
| "The Trillest" | 2013 | Funkmaster Flex | Who You Mad At? Me or Yourself? |
| "All Away" | 2013 | Elhae, Tory Lanez | Champagne Wishes |
| "Freaks" (Remix) | 2013 | French Montana, Nicki Minaj, Wale, Mavado, DJ Khaled | none |
| "Paid The Cost" | 2013 | Slim Thug | Welcome to Texas EP |
| "Rise Up" | 2013 | Mavado, Akon | none |
| "Trap House" | 2013 | French Montana, Birdman | Excuse My French |
| "Karate Chop" (Remix) | 2013 | Future, Birdman, French Montana | none |
| "Traphouse 3" | 2013 | Gucci Mane | Trap House III |
| "Kobe or Ginobili" (Remix) | 2013 | Mack Maine, Ace Hood, French Montana, Busta Rhymes | none |
| "Mars" | 2013 | Jay Sean | Neon |
| "Tired of Dreaming" | 2013 | Wale, Ne-Yo | The Gifted |
| "FuckWithMeYouKnowIGotIt" | 2013 | Jay-Z | Magna Carta... Holy Grail |
| "Boy Outta Here" | 2013 | Ciara | Ciara |
| "50 Plates" | 2013 | Rich Gang | Rich Gang |
| "Hands Up" | 2013 | Swizz Beatz, Nicki Minaj, 2 Chainz, Lil Wayne | none |
| "Rich Porter" | 2013 | Meek Mill | Dreamchasers 3 |
| "Dope Dealer" | 2013 | Meek Mill, Nicki Minaj | Dreamchasers 3 |
| "Hold On" | 2013 | Pusha T | My Name Is My Name |
| "The Weather" | 2013 | Nipsey Hussle, Cuzzy Capone | Crenshaw |
| "I Feel Like Pac/I Feel Like Biggie" | 2013 | DJ Khaled, Diddy, Meek Mill, T.I., Swizz Beatz | Suffering from Success |
| "You Don't Want These Problems" | 2013 | DJ Khaled, 2 Chainz, Ace Hood, Meek Mill, French Montana, Big Sean, Timbaland | Suffering from Success |
| "Fire" | 2013 | Bun B, 2 Chainz, Serani | Trill OG: The Epilogue |
| "Ain't Worried About Nothin" (Remix) | 2013 | French Montana, Diddy, Snoop Dogg | none |
| "10 2 10" (Remix) | 2013 | Big Sean, Travi$ Scott | none |
| "Dis Ain't What U Want" (Remix) | 2013 | Lil Durk, French Montana, Meek Mill | none |
| "Champagne" | 2013 | E-40, French Montana | The Block Brochure: Welcome to the Soil 6 |
| "Look Me In My Eyes" | 2013 | Vado, Rick Ross | Sinatra |
| "Paranoid" (Remix) | 2014 | French Montana, Diddy, Chinx Drugz, Lil Durk, Jadakiss | Coke Boys 4 |
| "Wit It" | 2014 | French Montana, Mally Mall, Jazz Lazer, Detail | Coke Boys 4 |
| "New Flame" | 2014 | Chris Brown, Usher | X |
| "Worry No More" | 2014 | Jennifer Lopez | A.K.A. |
| "Nevermind That" | 2014 | Ab-Soul | These Days... |
| "Insomniak" | 2014 | Mac Miller | Faces |
| "We Dem Boyz" (Remix) | 2014 | Wiz Khalifa, Schoolboy Q, Nas | Blacc Hollywood |
| "Beautiful" | 2014 | Jeezy, The Game | Seen It All: The Autobiography |
| "I Mean It (Remix)" | 2014 | G-Eazy | none |
| "Don't" (Remix) | 2014 | Ed Sheeran | Don't EP |
| "Good Kisser" (Remix) | 2014 | Usher | none |
| "You Can Tell How I Walk" | 2014 | T.I. | Paperwork |
| "Black Bottles" | 2014 | Migos | none |
| "Often" (Remix) | 2014 | The Weeknd, Schoolboy Q | none |
| "All About the Money" (Remix) | 2014 | Troy Ave, Jeezy | none |
| "Revory (Wraith)" | 2015 | Raekwon, Ghostface Killah | Fly International Luxurious Art |
| "I'm Ya Dogg" | 2015 | Snoop Dogg, Kendrick Lamar | Bush |
| "Bad Bitch" (Remix) | 2015 | French Montana, Jeremih, Fabolous | none |
| "Do What I Do" | 2015 | Scarface, Nas, Z-Ro | Deeply Rooted |
| "Love in the Sky" | 2015 | Do or Die, Scootie P | Picture This II |
| "Choices (Yup)" (Remix) | 2015 | E-40, Migos | —N/a |
| "Seen or Saw" (Remix) | 2015 | Lil Reese | none |
| "Ain't Nuttin'" | 2015 | French Montana | Casino Life 2: Brown Bag Legend |
| "BRRRR" | 2015 | Fat Trel, Wale | Georgetown |
| "Geetchi Liberaci" | 2015 | Fat Trel | Georgetown |
| "Been That" | 2015 | Meek Mill | Dreams Worth More Than Money |
| "Hands Down" | 2015 | Remy Ma, Yo Gotti | none |
| "Baller Alert" | 2016 | Tyga, 2 Chainz | Rawwest Nigga Alive |
| "All Good" | 2016 | Trae tha Truth, Audio Push, T.I. | Tha Truth Pt. 2 |
| "Milly Rock" (Remix) | 2016 | 2 Milly, ASAP Ferg | none |
| "Your Life" | 2016 | Rockie Fresh | The Night I Went To... |
| "Empire" | 2016 | J.U.S.T.I.C.E. League, Drake | Justice for All |
| "We Don't" | 2016 | N.O.R.E., Ty Dolla $ign, Cityboy Dee | Drunk Uncle |
| "Dope Boys" | 2016 | Curren$y, Purps | Bourbon Street Secrets |
| "Swipe Life" | 2016 | ASAP Ferg | Always Strive and Prosper |
| "Babuli Jabulah" | 2016 | 100 Kila | Това, че нямаш, не означава, че не можеш да бъдеш |
| "Layers" | 2016 | Royce da 5'9", Pusha T | Layers |
| "Bag For It" | 2016 | Tru Life, Velous | none |
| "Money Machine" | 2016 | Gucci Mane | Woptober |
| "Knotty Head" | 2016 | Denzel Curry | Imperial |
| "Big Talk" | 2016 | Azealia Banks | Slay-Z |
| "Black Superhero Car" | 2016 | Smoke DZA, Pete Rock | Don't Smoke Rock |
| "Supa Freak" | 2017 | Tory Lanez | The New Toronto 2 |
| "9-24-7000" | 2017 | Action Bronson | Blue Chips 7000 |
| "Hungry" | 2017 | Fergie | Double Dutchess |
| "Pinky Ring" | 2017 | Lil Pump, Smokepurpp | Lil Pump |
| "Like Them" | 2017 | Jeezy, Tory Lanez | Pressure |
| "Connect The Dots" | 2017 | Meek Mill, Yo Gotti | Wins & Losses |
| "Made It From Nothing" | 2017 | Meek Mill, Teyana Taylor | Wins & Losses |
| "Loss 4 Wrdz" | 2017 | Gucci Mane | Droptopwop |
| "Wild One" | 2017 | DJ Kay Slay, 2 Chainz, Kevin Gates, Meet Sims | The Big Brother |
| "Watch Money Fall" | 2017 | Juicy J, Project Pat | Highly Intoxicated |
| "Boss Talk" | 2017 | Slim Thug, Jack Freeman | The World Is Yours |
| "Know About" | 2017 | Harry Fraud | The Coast |
| "Better Man" | 2017 | PartyNextDoor | Seven Days |
| "VSVSVS" | 2017 | 24hrs | Not Open Late (EP) |
| "Got Me Crazy" (No Better Love) | 2017 | DJ E-Feezy, Fabolous, K. Michelle | none |
| "Tranquillo" | 2017 | Lupe Fiasco, Big K.R.I.T. | Drogas Light |
| "On Everything" | 2017 | DJ Khaled, Travis Scott, Big Sean | Grateful |
| "Down For Life" | 2017 | DJ Khaled, PartyNextDoor, Future, Travis Scott, Kodak Black | Grateful |
| "Pull a Caper" | 2017 | DJ Khaled, Kodak Black, Gucci Mane | Grateful |
| "Whatever" | 2017 | DJ Khaled, Young Thug, 2 Chainz | Grateful |
| "Head Up Eyes Open" | 2017 | Talib Kweli, Yummy Bingham | Radio Silence |
| "Gummo" (Remix) | 2018 | Omelly | none |
| "Cheapthrills" | 2018 | Gunplay | none |
| "Think About it" | 2018 | Rich Homie Quan | Rich as in Spirit |
| "Made It" | 2018 | Rich the Kid, Jay Critch | The World Is Yours |
| "Go Get the Money" | 2018 | Zaytoven, T.I., Pusha T, Yo Gotti | Trapholizay |
| "Hard Piano" | 2018 | Pusha T | Daytona |
| "Capone Suite" | 2018 | Future, Smif-N-Wessun | (Superfly) Original Motion Picture Soundtrack |
| "Fresh Prince of Belaire" | 2018 | Dave East | —N/a |
| "Last Forever" | 2018 | Russ, Snoop Dogg | Zoo |
| "Jugg King" | 2018 | T.I., Young Scooter | |
| "Nostalgia" | 2018 | Fat Trel | Finally Free |
| "Special Love" | 2018 | Fred the Godson | none |
| "Check" | 2018 | Mike Will Made It, Nas | Creed II: The Album |
| "Just Blaze" | 2018 | Drake | none |
| "What's Free" | 2018 | Meek Mill, Jay-Z | Championships |
| "Never Personal" | 2019 | Lacrim | Lacrim |
| "Let Me Tell Ya" | 2019 | Smif-N-Wessun | The All |
| "Big Boy Talk" | 2019 | DJ Khaled, Jeezy | Father of Asahd |
| "Birdz" | 2019 | Denzel Curry | Zuu |
| "Just In Case" | 2019 | Swizz Beatz, DMX | Godfather of Harlem |
| "OG" | 2019 | Dave East, The-Dream | Survival |
| "State of the Union" | 2019 | Jim Jones, Marc Scibilia | El Capo |
| "Money In The Grave" | 2019 | Drake | —N/a |
| "Lame" | 2019 | Gucci Mane, Wiz Khalifa | Delusions of Grandeur |
| "1 Question" | 2019 | E-40, Chris Brown, Jeremih | Practice Makes Paper |
| "06" | 2019 | Jeezy | TM104: The Legend of The Snowman |
| "I Came I Saw" | 2019 | Kwesta | none |
| "Future Bright" | 2020 | Bryson Tiller | Bad Boys for Life |
| "Dopechella" | 2020 | Yo Gotti | Untrapped |
| "Scottie Beam" | 2020 | Freddie Gibbs, The Alchemist | Alfredo |
| "Candy" | 2020 | Berner, B-Real | Los Meros |
| "Big Dawg" | 2020 | Smokepurpp | Florida Jit |
| "Mugello Red" | 2020 | Curren$y, Harry Fraud | The OutRunners |
| "Get Out" | 2020 | Akon | Ain't No Peace |
| "Open Hand" | 2020 | DeJ Loaf | Sell Sole II |
| "Where Would I Go" | 2020 | Benny The Butcher | Burden of Proof |
| "Respect the Code" | 2020 | T.I. | The L.I.B.R.A. |
| "Legend" | 2020 | Joyner Lucas | Evolution |
| "Master Fard Muhammad" | 2020 | Busta Rhymes | Extinction Level Event 2: The Wrath of God |
| "YRB" | 2020 | 2 Chainz, Skooly | So Help Me God! |
| "Almighty Black Dollar" | 2020 | Jeezy | The Recession 2 |
| "Both of Us" | 2020 | YFN Lucci, Layton Greene | Wish Me Well 3 |
| "Lifestyle of the Rich & Hated" | 2020 | G-Eazy | When It's Dark Out (Deluxe) |
| "Dope Boyz & Trap Godz" | 2020 | Young Scooter, Zaytoven, 2 Chainz | Zaystreet |
| "Lemon Pepper Freestyle" | 2021 | Drake | Scary Hours 2 |
| "This Is My Year" | 2021 | DJ Khaled, A Boogie wit da Hoodie, Big Sean, Puff Daddy | Khaled Khaled |
| "Manslaughter" | 2021 | Pop Smoke, The-Dream | Faith |
| "You Only Live Twice" | 2021 | Drake, Lil Wayne | Certified Lover Boy |
| "Lightyears" | 2021 | Wale | Folarin II |
| "Touch the Sky" | 2021 | French Montana, John Legend | They Got Amnesia |
| "Gangster of Love" | 2021 | Guè | GVESVS |
| "Too Many Goats" | 2021 | Berner, Jadakiss, Nas, Kevin Cossom | GOTTI |
| "God Did" | 2022 | DJ Khaled, Lil Wayne, Jay-Z, John Legend, Fridayy | God Did |
| "Rounds" | 2022 | John Legend | Legend |
| "Lobster Omelette" | 2022 | Freddie Gibbs | $oul $old $eparately |
| "Ice Cream" | 2022 | Freddie Gibbs | $oul $old $eparately |
| "The Scenic Route" | 2022 | Dr. Dre, Anderson .Paak | The Contract |
| "Tear Gas" | 2022 | Conway the Machine, Lil Wayne | God Don't Make Mistakes |
| "Save The Best For Last" | 2022 | The Game | Drillmatic – Heart vs. Mind |
| "DunHill" | 2023 | Westside Gunn | And Then You Pray For Me |
| "Can´t Believe You" | 2023 | 2 Chainz, Lil Wayne | Welcome 2 Collegrove |
| "Splash Brothers" | 2024 | French Montana, Lil Wayne | Mac & Cheese 5 |
| "Ya Don´t Stop" | 2024 | DJ Premier, Lil Wayne, Big Sean | —N/a |
| "Numb" | 2025 | Jala Brat, Buba Corelli | Roze suze |
| "Mini Kelly" | 2025 | Bryson Tiller | Solace & The Vices |

== Music videos ==
=== As lead artist ===
List of music videos, with directors, showing year released
| Title | Year | Director(s) |
|---|---|---|
| "Hustlin'" | 2006 | Gil Green |
| "Push It" | 2006 | Benny Boom |
| "Speedin'" (featuring R. Kelly) | 2007 | Gil Green |
| "The Boss" (featuring T-Pain) | 2008 | Diane Martel |
| "Here I Am" (featuring Nelly and Avery Storm) | 2008 | Gil Green |
| "This Is the Life" (featuring Trey Songz) | 2008 | Antwan Smith |
| "Mafia Music" | 2009 | Spiff TV |
| "Magnificent" (featuring John Legend) | 2009 | Gil Green |
| "All I Really Want" (featuring The-Dream) | 2009 | Gil Green |
| "Yacht Club" | 2009 | Spiff TV |
| "Rich Off Cocaine" (featuring Avery Storm) | 2009 | Spiff TV |
| "Gunplay" (featuring Gunplay) | 2009 | Spiff TV |
| "Bossy Lady" (featuring Ne-Yo) | 2009 | Spiff TV |
| "Valley of Death" | 2009 | Spiff TV |
| "Face" (featuring Trina) | 2009 | Spiff TV |
| "In Cold Blood" | 2009 | Spiff TV |
| "Cigar Music" (featuring Masspike Miles) | 2009 | Spiff TV |
| "Lay Back" (featuring Robin Thicke) | 2009 | Gil Green |
| "Super High" (featuring Ne-Yo) | 2010 | F. Gary Gray |
| "Fire Hazard" | 2010 | Spiff TV |
| "Sweet Life" (featuring John Legend) | 2010 | Spiff TV |
| "300 Soldiers" | 2010 | Spiff TV |
| "B.M.F. (Blowin' Money Fast)" (featuring Styles P) | 2010 | Parris |
| "MC Hammer" (featuring Gucci Mane) | 2010 | Spiff TV |
| "I'm Not a Star" | 2010 | Spiff TV |
| "Aston Martin Music" (featuring Chrisette Michele and Drake) | 2010 | Gil Green |
| "Veteran's Day" (featuring Lil Wayne and Birdman) | 2010 | Spiff TV |
| "Ashes To Ashes" | 2011 | Dre Films |
| "10 Bricks" (featuring Birdman) | 2011 | Dre Films |
| "Made Men" (featuring Drake) | 2011 | Dre Films |
| "9 Piece" (featuring Lil Wayne) | 2011 | Gil Green |
| "Stay Schemin'" (featuring Drake and French Montana) | 2012 | Spiff TV |
| "Yella Diamonds" | 2012 | Dre Films |
| "MMG Untouchable" | 2012 | Spiff TV |
| "High Definition" | 2012 | Dre Films |
| "I Swear to God" | 2012 | Dre Films |
| "Party Heart" (featuring Stalley and 2 Chainz) | 2012 | Dre Films |
| "Ring Ring" (featuring Future) | 2012 | Dre Films |
| "Touch'N You" (featuring Usher) | 2012 | Chris Robinson |
| "So Sophisticated" (featuring Meek Mill) | 2012 | Dre Films |
| "Hold Me Back" | 2012 | Taj |
| "911" | 2012 | Dre Films |
| "Amsterdam" | 2012 | Dre Films |
| "Presidential" (featuring Elijah Blake) | 2012 | Dre Films |
| "Diced Pineapples" (featuring Drake and Wale) | 2012 | Director X |
| "Ten Jesus Pieces" (featuring Stalley) | 2012 | Dre Films |
| "3 Kings" (featuring Jay-Z and Dr. Dre) | 2012 | Dre Films |
| "Pirates" | 2013 | Rick Ross |
| "Ashamed" | 2013 | Dre Films |
| "Ice Cold" (featuring Omarion) | 2013 | Dre Films |
| "Box Chevy" | 2013 | Dre Films |
| "No Games" (featuring Future) | 2013 | Colin Tilley |
| "Oyster Perpetual" | 2014 | Dre Films |
| "Nobody" (featuring French Montana) | 2014 | Dre Films |
| "War Ready" (featuring Young Jeezy) | 2014 | Taj |
| "Rich Is Gangsta" | 2014 | Dre Films |
| "Thug Cry" (featuring Lil Wayne) | 2014 | Dre Films |
| "Supreme" | 2014 | Dre Films |
| "What a Shame" (featuring French Montana) | 2014 | Eif Rivera |
| "Drug Dealers Dream" | 2014 | Dre Films |
| "Elvis Presley Blvd." (featuring Project Pat) | 2014 | Dre Films |
| "Keep Doin' That (Rich Bitch)" (featuring R. Kelly) | 2014 | Dre Films |
| "Trap Luv" (featuring Yo Gotti) | 2014 | Dre Films |
| "If They Knew" (featuring K. Michelle) | 2014 | Dre Films |
| "Hood Billionaire" | 2014 | Dre Films |
| "Nickel Rock" (featuring Boosie Badazz) | 2014 | Cris |
| "Wuzzup" | 2015 | Latch Lab |
| "Movin' Bass" (featuring Jay-Z) | 2015 | Ryan Snyder |
| "Phone Tap" | 2015 | Ryan Snyder |
| "Quintessential" (featuring Snoop Dogg) | 2015 | Ryan Snyder |
| "Neighborhood Drug Dealer (Remix)" (featuring Future) | 2015 | Ryan Snyder |
| "Family Ties" | 2015 | Ryan Snyder |
| "Dog Food" | 2015 | Ryan Snyder |
| "Heavyweight" (featuring Whole Slab) | 2015 | Ryan Snyder |
| "Money & Powder" | 2015 | Ryan Snyder |
| "Geechi Liberace" | 2015 | Ryan Snyder |
| "Money Dance" (featuring The-Dream) | 2015 | Ryan Snyder |
| "Bill Gates" | 2015 | Ryan Snyder |
| "Sorry" (featuring Chris Brown) | 2015 | Taj |
| "2 Shots" | 2015 | Ryan Snyder |
| "Crocodile Python" | 2015 | Ryan Snyder |
| "Carol City" | 2016 | Ryan Snyder |
| "Peace Sign" | 2016 | Ryan Snyder |
| "Free Enterprise" (featuring John Legend) | 2016 | Ryan Snyder |

== Production discography ==
List of songwriting and executive production credits (excluding guest appearances, interpolations, and samples)
| Track(s) | Year | Credit | Artist(s) | Album |
|---|---|---|---|---|
| 5. "B R Right"; (featuring Ludacris) | 2002 | Songwriter | Trina | Diamond Princess |
| 6. "U & Me" | 2002 | Songwriter | Trina | Diamond Princess |
| 8. "Mouthing Off" | 2002 | Songwriter | Trina | Diamond Princess |
| 15. "100%" | 2002 | Songwriter | Trina | Diamond Princess |
| 5. "Looking For Love"; (featuring Usher) | 2010 | Songwriter | Diddy – Dirty Money | Last Train to Paris |
| 10. "Your Love"; (featuring Trey Songz) | 2010 | Songwriter | Diddy – Dirty Money | Last Train to Paris |
| 3. "Miami Nights" | 2011 | Songwriter | Wale | Ambition |
| —N/a | 2012 | Executive producer | French Montana | Excuse My French |
