= Gunplay discography =

- Studio albums: 2
- Singles: 11
- Mixtapes: 10
- Collaborative albums: 4

The discography of American hip hop recording artist Gunplay, consists of two studio albums, three compilation albums (with Maybach Music Group), ten mixtapes, and eleven singles. He has also released and recorded music with Southern hip hop group, Triple C's.

== Albums ==
=== Studio albums ===
List of albums, with selected chart positions and sales figures
Title	Album details	Peak chart positions		
Title	Album details	US	US R&B	US Rap
Living Legend	Released: July 31, 2015; Label: Maybach, Def Jam; Format: CD, digital download	171	17	11
The Plug	Released: June 9, 2017; Label: Real Talk; Format: CD, digital download	—	—	—
Haram	Released: September 29, 2017; Label: Real Talk; Format: CD, digital download	—	—	—
ACTIVE	Released: June 22, 2018; Label: Black Bilderburg Group, Empire; Format: CD, digital download	—	—	—
All Bullshit Aside	Released: April 8, 2022; Label: Black Bilderburg Group, Empire; Format: CD, digital download	—	—	—

=== Collaborative albums ===
Title	Album details	Peak chart positions					Sales
Title	Album details	US	US R&B	US Rap	CAN	FRA	Sales
Self Made Vol. 1 (with Maybach Music Group)	Released: May 23, 2011; Label: Maybach, Warner Bros.; Format: CD, digital download	5	1	1	—	—	US: 230,000
Self Made Vol. 2 (with Maybach Music Group)	Released: June 26, 2012; Label: Maybach, Warner Bros.; Format: CD, digital download	4	—	1	37	—	US: 133,000
Self Made Vol. 3 (with Maybach Music Group)	Released: September 17, 2013; Label: Maybach, Atlantic; Format: CD, digital download	4	1	1	—	182	US: 74,000
Dreadlocks & Headshots (with Mozzy)	Released: June 2, 2017; Label: Real Talk; Format: CD, digital download	—	—	—	—	—	
Mustard & Mayo (with Peryon J Kee)	Released: February 1, 2018; Label: White Cup; Format: CD, digital download	—	—	—	—	—	
Chop Stixx & Banana Clips (with Mozzy)	Released: September 13, 2019; Label: Real Talk; Format: CD, digital download	—	—	—	—	—	
"—" denotes a title that did not chart, or was not released in that territory.

== Mixtapes ==
List of mixtapes, with year released
Title	Mixtape details
Sniffahill (The First Gram)	Released: November 16, 2008; Label: Maybach; Format: Digital download
Don Logan	Released: April 21, 2010; Label: Maybach; Format: Digital download
Inglorious Bastard	Released: January 1, 2011; Label: Maybach; Format: Digital download
Off Safety	Released: May 29, 2011; Label: Maybach; Format: Digital download
Bogotá Rich: The Prequel	Released: March 9, 2012; Label: Maybach; Format: Digital download
601 & Snort	Released: September 3, 2012; Label: Maybach; Format: Digital download
Cops & Robbers	Released: January 18, 2013; Label: Maybach; Format: Digital download
Acquitted	Released: June 10, 2013; Label: Maybach; Format: Digital download
Gunplay	Released: October 8, 2014; Label: Maybach; Format: Digital download
The Fix Tape	Released: August 18, 2017; Label: X-Ray; Format: Digital download

== Singles ==
=== As lead artist ===
List of singles as lead performer, with selected chart positions, showing year released and album name
Title	Year	Album
"Drop"	2012	Cops & Robbers
"Bible on the Dash"	2013	601 & Snort
"Pyrex"	2013	Acquitted
"Bet Dat" (featuring Pusha T)	2013	Cops & Robbers
"Drop the Tint"	2013	Acquitted
"Kush" (featuring Lil Wayne and Rick Ross)	2013	MMG Priorities Vol. 1
"Krazy" (featuring Young Dro)	2014	MMG Priorities Vol. 3
"Aiight" (featuring Rick Ross)	2014	Gunplay
"The World Is Mine"	2015	Non-album single
"Chain Smoking" (featuring Stalley and Curren$y)	2015	Living Legend
"Wuzhanindoe" (featuring YG)	2015	Living Legend
"D-Boy Fresh"	2017	The Plug
"Cocaine"	2017	The Plug

== Other charted songs ==
List of songs, with selected chart positions, showing year released and album name
Title	Year	Peak chart positions	Album
Title	Year	US R&B	Album
"Rollin" (featuring Waka Flocka Flame)	2011	98	Inglorious Bastard
"Ghetto Symphony" (A$AP Rocky featuring Gunplay and A$AP Ferg)	2013	52	Long. Live. ASAP
"Beat the Shit" (Lil Wayne featuring Gunplay)	2013	60	I Am Not a Human Being II

== Guest appearances ==
List of non-single guest appearances, with other performing artists, showing year released and album name
Title	Year	Other artist(s)	Album
"Gunplay"	2009	Rick Ross	Deeper Than Rap
"On My Way"	2010	DJ Khaled, Kevin Cossom, Ace Hood, Bali, Desloc, BallGreezy, Iceberg, Piccalo, Red Rum, Young Cash	Victory
"Sell Out Everything"	2010	DJ Freddy Fred, Young Buck, Murphy Lee	Return of a St. Lunatic
"Don't Let Me Go"	2011	Pill	Self Made Vol. 1
"Pacman (Remix)"	2011	Pill, Rick Ross, Meek Mill, Tity Boi	The Diagnosis
"Why They Hate"	2011	Bow Wow	Greenlight 4
"Cartoon & Cereal"	2012	Kendrick Lamar	—N/a
"Slow Down"	2012	Torch, Meek Mill, Wale, Young Breed, Stalley	U.F.O. Vol. 2
"You Gotta Pay Me (Remix)"	2012	Messy Marv, Warren G, Bleu DaVinci	—N/a
"Hammer Time"	2012	P.Grant, Young Buck	On the Grind
"Talk to 'Em"	2012	N.O.R.E.	Crack on Steroids
"I Sell"	2012	OJ Da Juiceman	Cook Muzik 2
"Put Yourself In My Position"	2012	Meek Mill, Triple C's, Magazeen	No A/C
"Forgive Me"	2012	Torch, Young Breed, Provalone P	No A/C
"Got Damn" (Remix)	2012	Torch, 2 Chainz, Busta Rhymes, French Montana	No A/C
"Power Circle"	2012	Rick Ross, Wale, Meek Mill, Gunplay, Stalley, Kendrick Lamar	Self Made Vol. 2
"Black on Black"	2012	Ace Hood, Bun B	Self Made Vol. 2
"Beam"	2012	Trina, Ice Berg	Back 2 Business
"Coke & White Bitches: Chapter 2"	2012	A$AP Ant, Danny Brown, Fat Trel	Lords Never Worry
"Excuse Me"	2012	DJ Kay Slay, Vado, Uncle Murda, Sauce Money	The Return of the Gate Keeper
"I'm A Shooter"	2012	Alley Boy	A Gift of Discernment
"Ain't No Way"	2012	NAKIM	—N/a
"Hunnid Bandz"	2012	Raw Facts	—N/a
"Smoking Good (Remix)"	2012	JD Era	No Handouts
"I Got It (Work)"	2012	Elhae	Every Life Has An Ending
"I Drink I Smoke (Remix)"	2012	Belly, Snoop Dogg	—N/a
"Vanilla Texture (Remix)"	2013	Masspike Miles, J'Rell	—N/a
"Ghetto Symphony"	2013	ASAP Rocky, ASAP Ferg	Long. Live. ASAP
"Ball (Remix)"	2013	Rick Ross	—N/a
"Whip Push"	2013	Kaboom, NH, Peedi Crakk, Red Café	We On Our Way Vol. 3
"55"	2013	Vado	Slime Flu 3
"Violent Music" (Remix)	2013	DJ Kay Slay, DJ Paul, Busta Rhymes, Vado, Bun B	Grown Man Hip Hop Part 2 (Sleepin' with the Enemy)
"Good Alcohol"	2013	Young Breed, Torch	Young Nigga Old Soul
"Blame It on the System"	2013	Turk	Blame It on the System
"My Last Molly Song Ever, I Promise"	2013	Problem, Trinidad James	The Separation
"Beat the Shit"	2013	Lil Wayne	I Am Not a Human Being II
"Pussy"	2013	Travis Scott, Fredo Santana, Chuck Inglish	Owl Pharaoh
"Drive By"	2013	Torch, Young Breed	Tax Season
"Not Enough Real Niggas Left"	2013	Philthy Rich, Trouble	Not Enough Real Niggas Left 2
"Yall Niggaz Aint Hittaz (Remix)"	2013	Katie Got Bandz	Project Drillary Clinton
"Rollin'"	2013	Rockie Fresh, Dot da Genius	The Birthday Tape
"Turn Up Don't Turn Down"	2013	Dirti Diana	R.I.P. To The Competition
"Nothin 4 Da Radio"	2013	The Mad Rapper	Got Anotha Record Deal
"Ready for That Ride"	2013	Iceberg	Rise To Power
"Real Nigga"	2013	Elhae	Champagne Wishes
"Hustlaz Intuition"	2013	DJ Scream, Ace Hood	The Ratchet Superior
"She Fuckin Everybody"	2013	Block 125	No Sponsor
"Double Up"	2013	A.G. Cubano	Power Move
"N.E.R.N.L. (Remix)"	2013	Philthy Rich, Problem	N.E.R.N.L. 2
"G Rind (Remix)"	2013	Papoose, Waka Flocka Flame	—N/a
"Crispy Hunneds"	2013	DJ Naim, Maino, Jim Jones, David Rush	I Got Now
"Rackem"	2013	Torch, Young Breed	No AC Vol. 2
"Special Delivery"	2013	Masspike Miles	Skky Miles 3: Blocks N' Bedrooms
"Murda"	2014	DJ Kay Slay, Young Buck, N.O.R.E.	The Last Hip Hop Disciple
"Streets"	2014	BNice, $ean J	Enormous EP
"Guns and Butter"	2016	Cormega	
"Nobody's Favorite"	2019	Rick Ross	Port of Miami 2

== See also ==
- Triple C's discography
