= Set in Stone (Rick Ross album) =

Studio album by Rick Ross
- Released: July 17, 2026
- Recorded: 2024–2026
- Genre: Hip-hop
- Length: 65:11
- Labels: Maybach; Gamma
- Producers: Ayo B; Tarik Azzouz; Bigg D; Cardiak; D. Rich; Damn James!; Mike Dean; Dr Zeuz; Dyryk; Eyya; Ron "Neff-U" Feemster; Fuse; HrtOnIce; J.U.S.T.I.C.E. League; Jambo; Jordan Hollywood; Major Seven; Metro Boomin; Motif Alumni; Mr. Hanky; Muzikman Sam; Lamb; SkipOnDaBeat; Slow-Life; Streetrunner; Swift; TropDavinci; Zay Guevera

Rick Ross chronology
| Too Good to Be True (2023) | Set in Stone (2026) |

Singles from Set in Stone
- 1. "Minks in Miami" Released: March 20, 2026; 2. "Mahogany Caskets" Released: June 12, 2026

Professional ratings
Review scores
| Source | Rating |
|---|---|
| HotNewHipHop | 4.08/5 |
| Pitchfork | 6.0/10 |
| Spectrum Culture | 61% |

Set in Stone is the twelfth studio album by American rapper Rick Ross. It was released on July 17, 2026, through Maybach Music Group and gamma.. The album features guest appearances by Big Tony, BigXthaPlug, Deon Cole, Don Toliver, French Montana, Gucci Mane, Jeezy, Leon Thomas, Max B, Nino Breeze, Rich the Kid, T.I., The-Dream and Yung Miami. The production on the album was handled by several producers including Bigg D, Cardiak, J.U.S.T.I.C.E. League, Metro Boomin, Mike Dean and Ron "Neff-U" Feemster. It is his first solo studio album since Richer Than I Ever Been (2021).

== Background ==
Following the release of his eleventh studio album, Richer Than I Ever Been (2021), Rick Ross began developing material for his next solo project. In January 2024, he publicly confirmed that a new album was in the works.

The title Set in Stone was confirmed by Ross in late June 2025, shortly after the release of the promotional single For the Money, produced by Pharrell Williams. In an interview with 103.5 The Beat, he explained the name as a statement about permanence and legacy: “I just feel like a thousand years from now you got to make sure this shit set in stone man… We got to leave something behind for the little hustlers a thousand years from now.” He also indicated the project was “close to being done.”

In promotional comments around For the Money, Ross described the record as something that would “forever guarantee my name is set in stone.”

Set in Stone is Ross’s first solo studio album in five years and arrived during the 20th-anniversary celebrations of his debut album Port of Miami (2006). Around the time of the album’s rollout, he was performing on the Port of Miami 20th Anniversary Black-Tie Experience Orchestra Tour.

The formal release date of July 17, 2026, was announced on June 11, 2026. The announcement coincided with the rollout of additional singles, Minks in Miami, which features French Montana and Max B, followed by Mahogany Caskets, which features T.I..

== Track listing ==
Set in Stone track listing
| No. | Title | Writer(s) | Producer(s) | Length |
|---|---|---|---|---|
| 1. | "Caviar Bumps" | William Leonard Roberts II; Eduardo Earle; Alina Galueva; Eduardo Hernández; Jose Rodriguez; Shelley W. Spruill II | Fuse; Zay Guevera; Alean^{[a]} | 3:34 |
| 2. | "Mahogany Caskets" (featuring T.I.) | Roberts; Clifford Harris; Theron Otis Feemster | Ron "Neff-U" Feemster | 3:33 |
| 3. | "Minks in Miami" (with French Montana and Max B) | Roberts; Karim Kharbouch; Charles Wingate; James Royo | Damn James! | 2:50 |
| 4. | "Face Down" (with Rich the Kid) | Roberts; Dimitri Leslie Roger; Leland Wayne; Mike Dean | Metro Boomin; Dean | 3:58 |
| 5. | "Ring Around the Rolls" (with YFN Lucci) | Roberts; Rayshawn Lamar Bennett; Raúl Bermejo; Keith Dawson; Mathieu Gilbert | HrtOnIce; Jambo | 4:01 |
| 6. | "Camel Meat" (with Deon Cole) | Roberts; Deon Cole; Nicholas Warwar; Tarik Azzouz | Streetrunner; Azzouz | 3:25 |
| 7. | "Maybach Music VII" (with Jeezy featuring Don Toliver) | Roberts; Jay Jenkins; Caleb Toliver; Jahshua Brown; Earle; Marcus Fitzgerald Rucker Jr.; Hernández | Fuse; Motif Alumni | 4:52 |
| 8. | "Living Large" (featuring BigXthaPlug) | Roberts; Xavier Landum; Corey Arthur Dennard | Mr. Hanky | 2:28 |
| 9. | "Purple Fentanyl" | Roberts; Dwayne Richardson | D. Rich | 2:50 |
| 10. | "#23" | Roberts; Ericka Capuli; Earle; Hernández | Eyya; Fuse | 2:57 |
| 11. | "Porsche GT3 - RS" | Roberts; Jordan Gomez; Edgar Ferrera; Hernández | Jordan Hollywood; SkipOnDaBeat | 2:36 |
| 12. | "City Lights" (featuring The-Dream) | Roberts; Terius Gesteelde-Diamant; Andrew O'Brien; Jesus Bobe; Derek Garcia; Hernández | Ayo B; Dr Zeuz; Dyryk | 3:07 |
| 13. | "Chain of Command" (with Nino Breeze and Big Tony) | Roberts; Vaughn A. Matthews; Antonio Marcello Saenz; Brandon Ray Aguirre | Slow-Life | 2:42 |
| 14. | "Remarkable Hussle" (with Leon Thomas) | Roberts; Leon George Thomas III; Carl McCormick; Steve Thornton II; Hernández; Ermias Asghedom; Mike James Kirkland | Cardiak; Swift | 3:46 |
| 15. | "Big Fish" (with Gucci Mane) | Roberts; Radric Delantic Davis; David Anthony Bermudez; Hernández | TropDavinci | 3:55 |
| 16. | "Diamonds Never Die" (with Kodak Black and Ball Greezy) | Roberts; Kinta Cox; Bill Kapri; Omar Walker; Hernández | Major Seven; Muzikman Sam | 4:31 |
| 17. | "She's My Star" (featuring Yung Miami) | Roberts; Caresha Brownlee; Erik Ortiz; Kevin Crowe; Ismael Enrique Howard | J.U.S.T.I.C.E. League; Enrique 1X^{[c]} | 2:23 |
| 18. | "Do It One Time" (with Young Breed and DJ Nasty) | Roberts; Jarrod Williams; Derrick Baker; Cainon Lamb; Randall Floyd | Bigg D; Lamb | 3:45 |
| 19. | "The Algorithm" | Roberts; Asghedom; Baker; Lamb | Bigg D; Lamb | 3:46 |
| Total length: | | | | 65:11 |

=== Notes ===
- ^{^[c]} indicates a co-producer
- ^{^[a]} indicates an additional producer

== Personnel ==
Credits are adapted from Tidal.

=== Musicians ===
- Rick Ross – lead vocals
- T.I. – vocals (track 2)
- Cheyenne Tozzi – background vocals (3, 17)
- French Montana – vocals (3)
- Max B – vocals (3)
- Jessica Gomes – background vocals (3)
- Rich the Kid – lead vocals (4)
- YFN Lucci – lead vocals (5)
- Deon Cole – vocals (6)
- Don Toliver – lead vocals (7)
- Jeezy – lead vocals (7)
- BigXthaPlug – lead vocals (8)
- The-Dream – lead vocals (12)
- Nino Breeze – lead vocals (13)
- Big Tony – lead vocals (13)
- Nipsey Hussle – background vocals (14, 19)
- Leon Thomas – vocals (14)
- Mike James Kirkland – vocals (14)
- Gucci Mane – lead vocals (15)
- Kodak Black – lead vocals (16)
- Ball Greezy – lead vocals (16)
- Symone Royale – background vocals (16)
- Marcaelis Sanders – bass guitar (16)
- Joakim Toftgard – horns (16)
- Muzikman Sam – keyboards (16)
- AllanOnSax – saxophone (16)
- Tim Reynolds – strings (16)
- Yung Miami – lead vocals (17)
- Wade Lonzel Brown – background vocals (17)
- Young Breed – lead vocals (18)
- DJ Nasty – DJ (18)
- Q-Beatz – programming (18)
- Beatz by Byrd – programming (19)

=== Technical ===
- Eddie "eMix" Hernández – engineering, mixing
- Jelani Bodden – engineering (3)
- David "TropDavinci" Bermudez – engineering (9, 13, 15, 17)
- Amani Hernández – engineering assistance, mixing assistance
- Colin Leonard – mastering
- Javier Valverde – Atmos mixing (3)

== Charts ==
Chart performance for Set in Stone
| Chart (2026) | Peak position |
|---|---|
| UK Album Downloads (Official Charts) | 87 |
| US Billboard 200 | 39 |
| US Independent Albums (Billboard) | 6 |
| US Top R&B/Hip-Hop Albums (Billboard) | 12 |
