= Custom Cars & Cycles =

Studio album by Triple C's
- Released: October 27, 2009
- Studios: Zenith Studios (Atlanta, GA); Lake Oasis (North Miami, FL)
- Genre: Southern hip-hop
- Length: 1:15:01
- Labels: Maybach; Def Jam
- Producers: B-Rock; Cool & Dre; Don Logan; Drumma Boy; Mitrxxx The Mad Scientist; OhZee; Phil 4 Real; Schife; The Olympicks

Rick Ross chronology
Deeper Than Rap (2009)	Custom Cars & Cycles (2009)	Teflon Don (2010)

Gunplay chronology
Custom Cars & Cycles (2009)	Living Legend (2015)

Singles from Custom Cars & Cycles
- 1. "Go" Released: August 31, 2009; 2. "Erryday" Released: September 29, 2009

Professional ratings
Review scores
Source	Rating
AllMusic	3/5 stars
HipHopDX	3/5

Custom Cars & Cycles is the only studio album by American Southern hip-hop quartet Triple C's. It was released October 27, 2009, via Maybach Music Group and Def Jam Recordings. Production was handled by Schife, OhZee, The Olympicks, Drumma Boy, B-Rock, Cool & Dre, Mitrxxx The Mad Scientist, Phil 4 Real, and Don Logan a.k.a. Gunplay. It features guest appearances from Masspike Miles, Birdman, Bun B, Gucci Mane, J.W., Mack 10, Suede Royale, The Game, Warren G, Yo Gotti and Young Jeezy. The album debuted at number 44 on the Billboard 200 and number 5 on the Top R&B/Hip-Hop Albums charts, selling 12,100 units in the United States.

== Track listing ==
No.	Title	Writer(s)	Producer(s)	Length
1.	"Custom Cars & Clips"	Richard Morales; William Roberts; Kevin Belnavis; Jarrod Williams; Ian Lewis; Oscar Zayas	Schife; OhZee	5:20
2.	"White Sand"	Morales; Roberts; Belnavis; Williams; Philip Pitts	Phil 4 Real	4:38
3.	"Break It Down" (featuring Bun B)	Morales; Roberts; Bernard Freeman	Don Logan a.k.a. Gunplay	3:57
4.	"Go" (featuring Birdman)	Morales; Roberts; Belnavis; Williams; Lewis; Zayas	Schife; OhZee	4:20
5.	"We Gettin' It"	Morales; Roberts; Belnavis; Williams; Lewis; Zayas	Schife; OhZee	4:19
6.	"Trick'n Off" (featuring Gucci Mane)	Morales; Roberts; Belnavis; Williams; Radric Davis; Christopher Gholson	Drumma Boy	6:22
7.	"Throw It in the Sky"	Morales; Roberts; Belnavis; Williams; David Stokes; Brian Parker; Bob Wicker; K. Miller; Jayson James	The Olympicks	3:55
8.	"Erryday" (featuring Young Jeezy and JW)	Morales; Roberts; Belnavis; Williams; Jay Jenkins; J. Walkins	Schife; OhZee	5:10
9.	"Customized"	Morales; Roberts; Belnavis; Williams; Lewis; Zayas	Schife; OhZee	3:35
10.	"Gangsta Shit" (featuring The Game)	Morales; Roberts; Belnavis; Williams; Jayceon Taylor; Baron Agee; Lorenzo Patterson; Andre Young	B-Rock	5:33
11.	"Finer Things" (featuring Masspike Miles)	Morales; Roberts; Belnavis; Williams; Miles Wheeler; Stokes; Parker; Wicker; Miller; James	The Olympicks	5:15
12.	"Chick'n Talk'n" (featuring Mack 10 and Warren G)	Morales; Roberts; Belnavis; Williams; Dedrick Rolison; Warren Griffin; Stokes; Parker; Wicker; Miller; James	The Olympicks	5:40
13.	"Diamonds & Maybachs Pt. 2" (featuring Suede Royale)	Morales; Roberts; Belnavis; Williams; Darius Casey; Delando Morrow; Phelan Johnson; Alain Mion	Mitrxxx The Mad Scientist	7:17
14.	"Hustla" (featuring Masspike Miles)	Morales; Roberts; Belnavis; Williams; Marcello Valenzano; Andre Lyon; Eric Bloom	Cool & Dre	5:36
15.	"Yams Pt. 2" (featuring Yo Gotti)	Morales; Roberts; Belnavis; Williams; Mario Mims; Gholson	Drumma Boy	4:04
Total length:				1:15:01

iTunes bonus tracks
No.	Title	Producer(s)	Length
16.	"Bless Me" (featuring Magazeen)	Mista Kingz	5:43

Sample credits

- Track 10 contains interpolations from "Prelude" written by Lorenzo Patterson and Andre Young
- Track 13 contains elements from "Chanson D'un Jour D'hiver" performed by Alain Mion & Cortex
- Track 14 contains interpolations from "Feel The Thunder" written by Eric Bloom

== Personnel ==
- Richard "Gunplay" Morales – vocals, producer (track 3)
- William "Rick Ross" Roberts – vocals, executive producer
- Kevin "Torch" Belnavis – vocals
- Jarrod "Young Breed" Williams – vocals
- Bernard "Bun B" Freeman – vocals (track 3)
- Bryan "Birdman" Williams – vocals (track 3)
- Radric "Gucci Mane" Davis – vocals (track 6)
- Jay "Young Jeezy" Jenkins – vocals (track 8)
- J. Walkins – vocals (track 8)
- Jayceon "The Game" Taylor – vocals (track 10)
- "Masspike Miles" Wheeler – vocals (tracks: 11, 14)
- Dedrick "Mack 10" Rolison – vocals (track 12)
- Warren Griffin III – vocals (track 12)
- Mario "Yo Gotti" Mims – vocals (track 15)
- Ian "Schife" Lewis – producer (tracks: 1, 4, 5, 8, 9)
- Oscar "OhZee" Zayas – producer (tracks: 1, 4, 5, 8, 9)
- David Stokes – keyboards (track 11), producer (tracks: 7, 11, 12)
- Brian Parker – keyboards (track 11), producer (tracks: 7, 11, 12)
- Bob Wicker – keyboards (track 11), producer (tracks: 7, 11, 12)
- K. Miller – keyboards (track 11), producer (tracks: 7, 11, 12)
- Jayson James – keyboards (track 11), producer (tracks: 7, 11, 12)
- Christopher "Drumma Boy" Gholson – producer (tracks: 6, 15)
- Philip "Phil 4 Real" Pitts – producer (track 2)
- Baron "B-Rock" Agee – producer (track 10)
- Delando "Mitrxxx The Mad Scientist" Morrow – producer (track 13)
- Marcello Valenzano – producer (track 14)
- Andre Lyon – producer (track 14)
- Eddie "eMIX" Hernandez – recording
- Gina Victoria – recording (track 14)
- Ray Seay – mixing
- Chris Athens – mastering
- Lili Picou – art direction, design
- Roger Erickson – photography

== Charts ==
Chart (2009)	Peak position
US Billboard 200	44
US Top R&B/Hip-Hop Albums (Billboard)	5
