= The Fix Tape =

Studio album by Gunplay
- Released: August 18, 2017
- Genre: Hip hop; rap
- Length: 32:49
- Label: X-Ray; Cleopatra

Gunplay chronology
| The Plug (2017) | The Fix Tape (2017) |

The Fix Tape is an album by Gunplay. The album was released on Cleopatra Records in August 2017.

== Track listing ==
Track listing adapted from iTunes.

| No. | Title | Length |
|---|---|---|
| 1. | "Can I Bring My Gun" | 2:03 |
| 2. | "Stamp" | 3:26 |
| 3. | "Hot Plate" | 2:16 |
| 4. | "Flip The Bed" | 3:25 |
| 5. | "Where It At" (featuring PJK) | 3:34 |
| 6. | "Dark Vader" | 2:53 |
| 7. | "Shaolin" | 2:45 |
| 8. | "Go Nuts" (featuring PJK) | 3:29 |
| 9. | "No Shake" | 3:06 |
| 10. | "Nightmare Now" | 2:06 |
| 11. | "Patience 2.0" | 3:46 |
| Total length: | | 32:49 |
