= Self Made Vol. 2 =

Compilation album by Maybach Music Group
- Released: June 26, 2012
- Recorded: 2011–12
- Genre: Hip hop
- Length: 60:17 (deluxe edition)
- Labels: Maybach; Def Jam; Warner Bros.; WMGreen
- Producers: Young Shun; Beat Billionaire; Boi-1da; Cardiak; Don Cannon; Southside; The Maven Boys; The Beat Bully; Ayo The Producer; Tha Bizness; J.U.S.T.I.C.E. League; The UpperClassmen; KyeBeatz

Maybach Music Group chronology
| Self Made Vol. 1 (2011) | Self Made Vol. 2 (2012) | Self Made Vol. 3 (2013) |

Singles from Self Made, Vol. 2
- 1. "Bag of Money" Released: April 3, 2012; 2. "Actin' Up" Released: 2012; 3. "Let's Talk" Released: June 5, 2012

Self Made Vol. 2 is the second compilation album by MMG. The album was released on June 26, 2012, by Maybach Music Group, Warner Bros. Records, and Def Jam Recordings. Like the previous album, Self Made Vol. 2 features contributions from members signed to the MMG label including Rick Ross, Wale, Meek Mill, Stalley, French Montana and Omarion along with Gunplay of Triple C's.

The album features guest appearances from Kendrick Lamar, Nas, Nipsey Hussle, Wiz Khalifa, Roscoe Dash, T-Pain, Ace Hood, Bun B & T.I. Producers on the album include Boi-1da, Don Cannon, Cardiak, Lee Major, The Beat Bully, and many more.

== Singles ==
The first official single "Bag Of Money", featuring Wale, Rick Ross, Meek Mill, and T-Pain, was released on April 3, 2012. On May 2, 2012, the music video was released for "Bag of Money" featuring Wale Rick Ross, Meek Mill, and T-Pain. On May 23, 2012, the music video was released for "Let's Talk" featuring Omarion and Rick Ross. On June 26, 2012, the music video was released for "Black Magic" featuring Meek Mill and Rick Ross. On June 26, 2012, the music video was released for "Power Circle" featuring Rick Ross, Gunplay, Stalley, Wale, Meek Mill and Kendrick Lamar. On July 2, 2012, the music video was released for "Actin Up" featuring Meek Mill, Wale and French Montana. On October 1, 2012, the music video was released for "Fountain of Youth" featuring Stalley, Rick Ross Nipsey Hussle. On October 3, 2012, the music video was released for "Bury Me a G" featuring T.I. and Rick Ross. On November 12, 2012, the music video was released for On November 23, 2012, the music video was released for "M.I.A." featuring Omarion and Wale. On November 20, 2012, the music video was released for "All Birds" featuring Rick Ross and French Montana.

== Critical reception ==
Professional ratings
Review scores
| Source | Rating |
|---|---|
| AllMusic | 4/5 stars |
| Entertainment Weekly | A− |
| HipHopDX | 3.5/5 stars |
| Pitchfork Media | 6.2/10 |
| Spin | 6/10 |
| XXL | (XL) |

Self Made Vol. 2 received generally positive reviews from music critics. At Metacritic, which assigns a normalized rating out of 100 to reviews from critics, the album received an average score of 70, which indicates "generally favorable reviews", based on 8 reviews. Carl Chery of XXL commended the performers' chemistry and stated, "There’s a clear hierarchy in song quality throughout the album, but no skip-worthy cuts." AllMusic editor David Jeffries called the album "an interesting mix of in-house and all-star, and another reason to take Ross the ring-leader seriously." However, Brandon Soderberg of Spin called them a "pseudo-supergroup of convenience" who "snarls, stunts, and simps luxuriously", and quipped, "needs more Gunplay." Roman Cooper of HipHopDX said, "Self Made Vol. 2 is a noted improvement from its predecessor. Aside from Rick Ross’ innate ability to choose great production and guest features, the project features Ross’ vision for his Maybach Music Group squad: a diverse collection of individuals whose differences are complementary. If the crew can manage to keep from occasionally lapsing into predictability, it'll be a force to be reckoned with for quite some time."

== Commercial performance ==
The album debuted at number four on the Billboard 200 with first-week sales of 98,000 copies.

== Track listing ==
| No. | Title | Producer(s) | Length |
|---|---|---|---|
| 1. | "Power Circle" (Rick Ross, Gunplay, Stalley, Wale and Meek Mill featuring Kendrick Lamar) | Lee Major | 8:36 |
| 2. | "Black Magic" (Meek Mill & Rick Ross) | Young Shun | 2:54 |
| 3. | "This Thing of Ours" (Rick Ross, Omarion & Wale featuring Nas) | Don Cannon | 4:09 |
| 4. | "All Birds" (Rick Ross & French Montana) | Beat Billionaire | 2:49 |
| 5. | "Actin' Up" (Wale, Meek Mill & French Montana) | Rico Love; Earl & E (co.) | 3:58 |
| 6. | "Fountain of Youth" (Stalley & Rick Ross featuring Nipsey Hussle) | Cardiak | 3:58 |
| 7. | "I Be Puttin' On" (Wale & French Montana featuring Wiz Khalifa & Roscoe Dash) | Boi-1da; The Maven Boys (co.) | 5:16 |
| 8. | "The Zenith" (Wale, Omarion, Rick Ross & Stalley) | Harry Fraud | 4:30 |
| 9. | "M.I.A." (Wale & Omarion) | The Beat Bully; Sha Sha; Jones (writers) | 3:57 |
| 10. | "Bag of Money" (Rick Ross, Wale and Meek Mill featuring T-Pain) | Beat Billionaire | 4:06 |
| 11. | "Let's Talk" (Omarion & Rick Ross featuring The Notorious B.I.G.) | Tha Bizness | 3:59 |
| 12. | "Black on Black" (Gunplay featuring Ace Hood & Bun B) | Beat Billionaire | 4:51 |
| 13. | "Fluorescent Ink" (Wale, Stalley & Rick Ross) | Cardiak; Trevor Chin (co.) | 3:21 |
| 14. | "Bury Me a G" (Rick Ross featuring T.I.) | Rick Ross; Beat Billionaire | 3:21 |

Sample credits

- Track eleven, "Let's Talk", contains elements of "Big Poppa" by The Notorious B.I.G. It also interpolates the chorus of "Let's Talk About Sex" by Salt-n-Pepa.

== Charts ==
=== Weekly charts ===
| Chart (2012) | Peak position |
|---|---|
| US Billboard 200 | 4 |
| US Top R&B/Hip-Hop Albums (Billboard) | 1 |

=== Year-end charts ===
| Chart (2012) | Position |
|---|---|
| US Billboard 200 | 113 |
| US Top R&B/Hip-Hop Albums (Billboard) | 23 |

== Release history ==
| Region | Date | Format(s) | Label | Edition(s) |
|---|---|---|---|---|
| United States | June 26, 2012 | CD, digital download | Maybach Music Group, Warner Bros. | Standard, deluxe |
