= Living Legend (Gunplay album) =

Studio album by Gunplay
- Released: July 31, 2015
- Recorded: 2013–15
- Genre: Hip hop
- Length: 50:04
- Labels: Maybach; Def Jam
- Producers: Andrew Balogh; Black Saun; The Beat Bully; DJ Mustard; D. Rich; DJ Pain 1; Eddie Montilla; Isak Swing; K Da Komposer; Mike Mulah; Mighty Joe; Onassis; Roc & Mayne; Suit Gang; Tyler Woods; The Mekanics

Singles from Living Legend
- 1. "Tell 'Em" Released: March 13, 2015; 2. "Wuzhanindoe" Released: June 2, 2015; 3. "Be Like Me" Released: July 10, 2015; 4. "Blood on the Dope" Released: July 17, 2015

Living Legend is the debut studio album by American rapper Gunplay. The album was released on July 31, 2015, by Maybach Music Group and Def Jam Recordings. The album was supported by the singles "Tell 'Em", "Wuzhanindoe", "Be Like Me" and "Blood on the Dope".

== Background ==
In November 2012, Gunplay stated the album would be released in 2013. In June 2014, in an interview with XXL, he spoke about the sound of the album, saying: "It’s going to be something for the world, not just for the hood. I’m already a hood nigga—I got hood tracks on there—but I want to take it to that next level." He explained the meaning behind the album title, saying: "I think the title fits me perfect. I elaborate on that a few times on the album to let y’all know why I am a Living Legend.” Later he said: "It’s gonna mean a lot to me and this title Living Legend, ’cause I been through 100 percent more than what these rap niggas been through, what the average nigga on the street been through and I’m still here. And I think it calls for a celebration and a title like Living Legend will embody that whole situation."

== Singles ==
On March 13, 2015, the album's lead single "Tell 'Em Daddy" was released. On June 2, 2015, the album's second single "Wuzhanindoe" featuring YG was released. On July 1, 2015, the music video was released for "Wuzhanindoe" featuring YG. On July 10, 2015, the album's third single "Be Like Me" featuring Rick Ross was released. On The July 17, 2015, the album's fourth single "Blood on the Dope" featuring PJK was released.

== Critical reception ==
Professional ratings
Aggregate scores
Source	Rating
Metacritic	68/100
Review scores
Source	Rating
AllMusic	4/5 stars
Billboard	3.5/5 stars
HipHopDX	3/5 stars
Pitchfork Media	6.5/10
Rolling Stone	3.5/5 stars
XXL	(L)

Living Legend received generally positive reviews from music critics. At Metacritic, which assigns a normalized rating out of 100 to reviews from mainstream critics, the album received an average score of 68 based on 8 reviews, which indicates "generally favorable reviews". David Jeffries of AllMusic said, "Being able to bellow like Busta Rhymes or Ludacris just makes everything bang harder, and with a lean 11 cuts on the album's normal release, Living Legend is a non-stop gangsta party connected to the street, offering a more approachable alternative to Ross' grandiose LPs." Jesse Fairfax of HipHopDX stated, "Gunplay’s repetitively destructive themes come as no shock given his stage name. While his long journey has finally paid off, Living Legend lacks it factor to have listeners clamoring for a follow-up anytime soon." David Drake of Pitchfork Media called it "a consistent release with no substantial misfires, full of densely packed verbiage and grand gestures, reminiscent of a time when technique, style, and personality seemed inseparable, interrelated qualities in a rapper's arsenal."

== Track listing ==
Living Legend — Standard edition
No.	Title	Producer(s)	Length
1.	"Tell 'Em"	D. Rich	4:15
2.	"Just Won't Do" (featuring PJK (Peryon J Kee))	Mike Mulah	3:22
3.	"Be Like Me" (featuring Rick Ross)	The Beat Bully	4:06
4.	"Only 1"	Black Saun; Tyler Woods	3:16
5.	"From Da Jump" (featuring Triple C's)	Andrew Balogh	4:29
6.	"Wuzhanindoe" (featuring YG)	DJ Mustard	3:07
7.	"Chain Smokin'" (featuring Stalley and Currensy)	K Da Komposer; Mighty Joe; Montilla	5:39
8.	"White Bitch"	Isak Swing	4:13
9.	"Blood on the Dope" (featuring Yo Gotti and PJK (Peryon J Kee))	Roc & Mayne	5:57
10.	"Dark Dayz"	Onassis; The Mekanics	6:09
11.	"Leave Da Game" (featuring Masspike Miles)	DJ Pain 1	5:31

== Charts ==
Chart (2015)	Peak position
US Billboard 200	171
US Top R&B/Hip-Hop Albums (Billboard)	17
US Top Rap Albums (Billboard)	11
