= Cartoon and Cereal =

"Cartoon & Cereal"

Song by Kendrick Lamar featuring Gunplay
- Released: February 14, 2012
- Recorded: 2012
- Studio: TDE Red Room (Carson)
- Genre: Progressive rap
- Length: 6:49
- Label: Top Dawg Entertainment
- Composer(s): Kendrick Duckworth; Ricci Riera; Axel Morgan
- Producer(s): THC

"Cartoon & Cereal" is a song by American rapper and songwriter Kendrick Lamar, released for digital download on February 14, 2012. Collaborating with Florida-based rapper Gunplay, Lamar originally intended to include the song on his major-label debut album, Good Kid, M.A.A.D City, but was discarded due to sampling issues and the track being leaked online beforehand.

== Critical reception ==
Jack Law, writing for Fact magazine, described experimentation that Lamar demonstrated on his album Section.80, released a year prior: "Kendrick's verse is predictably tricky to penetrate, full of multi-layered imagery and word-play, and will doubtless reward further study". Law further emphasized the unexpected collaboration between Lamar and Gunplay - a collaboration with an avant-garde musician and a "street" rapper. Writing for Pitchfork, Jordan Sargent referred to "Cartoons & Cereal" as the work of two artists who "have an anti-social streak that runs through their music".

Complex, which listed it as the second best song of 2012, wrote that "the best song ['Cartoon & Cereal'] that Kendrick Lamar released this year didn't even make the album [Good Kid, M.A.A.D City]". Music critic Niyah Nel reflected: "the 'inner voice' like approach on 'Cartoons & Cereal' made just the right impact to lead fans into wondering what to expect from his debut album, and it definitely boosted his ranking as an unmatched lyricist".
