= Torch (American rapper) =

Haitian-American rapper (born 1982)

- Born: Kevin Christopher Belnavis; July 12, 1982 (age 44); The Bronx, New York City, U.S.
- Origin: Miami, Florida, U.S.
- Genres: Hip hop
- Occupation: Rapper
- Labels: Maybach; Def Jam
- Website: www.torchisny.com

Kevin Christopher Belnavis (born July 12, 1982), better known by his stage name Torch, is an American rapper signed to Maybach Music Group as part of the group Triple C's. Born and with a childhood in the Castle Hill area of the Bronx, he was sent by his mother to live with his older sister in Miami, Florida, as a teen.

While living in Miami, he met William Leonard Roberts II, who came to be better known as musician Rick Ross; a Miami rapper called Gunplay, and rapper Young Breed; together, the four young men formed the Southern rap group Triple C's (aka Carol City Cartel).

== Childhood ==
Torch was born Kevin Christopher Belnavis to his parents Lorna and Christopher Belnavis on July 12, 1982, in the Castle Hill area of the Bronx, New York City. Kevin spent most of his childhood on the streets of this rough neighborhood and earned the nickname "Torch" for his volatile and unpredictable misbehavior. Fearful of the dangerous path her son was on, his mother Lorna sent Torch to Miami, Florida to live with his older sister. While living in Miami, Torch met Rick Ross, Gunplay, and Young Breed, future members of his Triple C's group.

== Education ==
Though skilled with words and wit, Torch struggled academically. Having attended PS 136 and Junior High School 125 in New York, he was expelled from three high schools before finding an advocate in the principal at the fourth. At Lehman High School, the school principal helped Torch catch up in his classes and makeup months of neglected work to graduate on time with his class. While in high school, Torch met Kenta "Geter K" Geter, future VP of Maybach Music Group, with whom he later signed.

== Incarceration ==
In 2005, Torch served a brief sentence in a New York state prison on drug charges. Shortly after his release, Rick Ross shot to fame with his platinum single "Hustlin'." Torch has said that he began to believe that his own life might amount to something larger than the struggle on the streets.

== Music ==
=== Triple C's ===
Newly out of prison, Torch joined Rick Ross, Gunplay and Young Breed to form the rap group Triple C's (aka Carol City Cartel). The group was recorded and featured on Ross's certified gold albums, Port of Miami (2006) and Trilla (2008). Their own first studio album, Custom Cars & Cycles, was released in 2009. The album reached peak positions of number two on the Billboard Rap Album chart and number 44 on Billboard's Top 200.

After releasing a series of independent mixtapes, Torch was given music's official stamp of approval from L.A. Reid, who dubbed the rapper, "what hip-hop's been missing."

=== Specialyst Entertainment ===
Torch is also CEO of Specialyst Entertainment, a music and artist management company based in New York.

== Discography ==
Collaboration albums

- 2009: Custom Cars & Cycles (with Triple C's)
- 2010: Color, Cut & Clarity (with Triple C's)

Compilation albums

- 2011: Self Made Vol. 1 (with Maybach Music Group)
- 2013: Self Made Vol. 3 (with Maybach Music Group)

Mixtapes

- 2008: Ski Mask Music
- 2010: Krash Kourse
- 2011: U.F.O. (Underestimated, Forgotten, & Overlooked) Vol. 1
- 2012: U.F.O. Vol. 2
- 2012: No A/C
- 2013: Tax Season
- 2013: Da Bronx Zoo
- 2013: No AC Vol. 2

Collaboration mixtapes

- 2008: Victory Lap
- 2009: Multi Millionaires
- 2009: White Sand
- 2011: Black Flag

=== Guest appearances ===
List of non-single guest appearances, with other performing artists, showing year released and album name
Title	Year	Other artist(s)	Album
" Street Judge"	2010	Masspike Miles	Supafly
"Home Run"	2011	Young Buck, Young Breed	Bond Money
"Main Event"	2011	Masspike Miles	The Road Less Traveled
"Live And Let Die"	2012	DJ Kay Slay, A-Mafia, Shoota	Grown Man Hip-Hop
"U Can Do It"	2013	J-Hood, Project Pat, Lil' Flip, Ron Browz	—N/a
"Good Alcohol"	2013	Young Breed, Gunplay	Young Nigga Old Soul
"Count Your Blessings"	2013	DJ Kay Slay, Vado, Uncle Murda	Grown Man Hip Hop Part 2 (Sleepin' With The Enemy)
"FTBS"	2013	Torae	Admission of Guilt
"Wherever I Fall"	2013	Richard Osborne	Nothing Personal
"No Sympathy"	2014	DJ Kay Slay, N.O.R.E., Saigon	The Rise of a City
"Fort Apache"	2014	DJ Kay Slay, Fred the Godson, Oun-P	The Last Hip Hop Disciple
