= Gunplay (rapper) =

American rapper

- Also known as: Don Logan
- Born: Richard Welton Morales Jr. July 18, 1979 (age 47); Texas, U.S.
- Origin: Carol City, Florida, U.S.
- Genre: Southern hip-hop
- Occupation: Rapper
- Works: Gunplay discography
- Years active: 2000–present
- Labels: Black Builderburg; X-Ray; Cleopatra; Real Talk; Def Jam (former); Maybach Music; Warner Bros.
- Member of: Triple C's
- Children: 2

Richard Welton Morales Jr. (born July 18, 1979), better known by his stage name Gunplay, is an American rapper from Carol City, Florida. He is best known for his work with fellow rapper Rick Ross, with whom he formed the hip hop group Triple C's in 2005, alongside Torch and Young Breed. Following their debut album, Custom Cars & Cycles (2009), Morales signed a solo recording contract with Ross' Maybach Music Group, which entered a joint venture with Def Jam Recordings in July 2012. His debut studio album, Living Legend (2015), narrowly entered the Billboard 200 and served as his only release on a major label.

== Early life ==
Born Richard Morales Jr. to a Puerto Rican father and Jamaican mother on July 18, 1979, Morales spent some of his early childhood in Opa-locka. By age 10, Morales' parents divorced and the family split. His father returned to Puerto Rico. Morales, his mother and younger brother later settled in Carol City located in Miami-Dade County. At the age of 15, Morales dropped out of high school after being told he would have to repeat ninth grade. After leaving school, Morales started using and selling cocaine at the age of 16 saying he used to spend $600–700 a week on drugs and thousands after his record deal.

== Music career ==
=== 1997–2009: Career beginnings with Triple C's ===
In 1997, he met with Miami-Dade County native Rick Ross and their passion for music led them to form the group Triple C's (Carol City Cartel) alongside rappers Torch and Young Breed. The group released their debut album Custom Cars & Cycles in 2009, which debuted at #44 on the U.S. Billboard 200.

=== 2009–2014: Solo career ===
Gunplay made his solo debut by appearing on Rick Ross' track "Gunplay" on his album Deeper Than Rap (2009). He released mixtapes under Maybach Music Group while appearing on featured tracks and making appearances on collaborative albums. In July 2012, he signed a solo deal with Def Jam. He released his first mixtape, 601 & Snort, in September 2012. It was praised by critics and was named the tenth best album of 2012 by Spin magazine. One of his featured guest appearance songs, "Cartoon & Cereal" with Kendrick Lamar, was ranked in Complex's Best 50 Songs of 2012 list at #2. Gunplay's mixtape Cops & Robbers was released on January 18, 2013. Gunplay was featured on Dirty Diana's R.I.P. To The Competition in June 2013. He was also featured on Lil Wayne's 2013 album I Am Not a Human Being II on the song "Beat The Shit".

=== 2015–present: Living Legend ===
Gunplay's debut album, Living Legend, was released on July 31, 2015. It had first been announced in 2012, initially with the title Bogota, then the title Medellin. Gunplay described the album as "raw" and a "real street album" by Gunplay. The album includes guest appearances by Rick Ross, Yo Gotti, YG, and Currensy, among others; it was meant to include other collaborations, including a track with Big Sean and another produced by Pharrell Williams titled "Steel Drums", but these did not materialize. Four singles were released from Living Legend: "Tell 'Em", "Wuzhanindoe", "Be Like Me" and "Blood on the Dope".

In 2019, Gunplay released the full-length collaborative album, Chop Stixx and Banana Clips with Mozzy. Writing about the project for Freemusicempire, Dan-O praised the project: "Gunplay and Mozzy paint pictures so you can see the crook's whole journey, not just the sentence".

== Personal life ==
Gunplay has a son with his ex-wife, from whom he divorced in 2008. His wife, Von'Shae Taylor-Morales, gave birth to his second child and first daughter, although Gunplay lost custody of her in October 2023. The month prior, he was arrested and charged with aggravated battery with a deadly weapon, child abuse, and domestic abuse. Von'Shae stated this was due to Gunplay's severe drug abuse, and has since filed a restraining order against the rapper.

Gunplay practiced Santeria, stating that he felt a "deeper connection" with God when he began practicing it. On October 2, 2026, Gunplay publicly denounced the practice of Santeria, noting the dangers; he also discussed "giving his life to Jesus".

Gunplay has a swastika tattoo and has given differing explanations for it. In a 2012 interview with Pigeons & Planes, Gunplay said he deliberately uses the tattoo to conflate Nazi atrocities with his intentions to deal with "bullshit out here." He continued: "I came to Nazi that shit. I came to Hitler that motherfucker. Put all the fake motherfuckers in the gas chamber and gas your fuck ass. That's what I'm here to do." Several months later, in a 2013 interview with Complex, he said: "Swastika was originally a sign of peace, happiness, and love. The Nazis turned it into the symbol of death. That's the same way I feel society does to people. We start off as innocent babies and it turns us into monsters. If the shoe fits, wear it." At the 2012 BET Hip Hop Awards, Gunplay was involved in a fist fight with members of 50 Cent's G-Unit affiliates backstage.

== Legal issues ==
TMZ reported that on October 10, 2012, Gunplay turned himself in to Miami authorities after a warrant was issued for his arrest on charges of armed robbery. According to his attorney, Gunplay could have faced life in prison if convicted on both counts. On October 22, 2012, he was given a $150,000 bond and placed on house arrest in connection to the robbery which took place at a Miami tax business. He was released from house arrest in January 2013. On February 25, 2013, Gunplay's trial began on the charges of armed robbery, assault with a deadly weapon and aggravated assault, stemming from when he allegedly pulled a gun on his accountant in April 2012. On the same day, the case was dismissed because the victim, Turron Woodside, refused to further cooperate with authorities. Woodside refused to authenticate the footage of the incident and was "out of town" according to his family. Subsequently, the prosecution in the armed robbery case was forced to drop the charges against Gunplay.

== Discography ==
Studio albums

- Living Legend (2015)
- The Plug (2017)
- Haram (2017)
- ACTIVE (2018)
- All Bullshit Aside (2022)

Collaborative albums

- Custom Cars & Cycles (with Triple C's) (2009)

== See also ==
- List of Afro-Latinos
