= Triple C's =

American hip hop group

- Origin: Miami Gardens, Florida, U.S.
- Genres: Hip hop
- Years active: 2005–present
- Labels: Maybach; Def Jam
- Members: Rick Ross; Torch; Gunplay; Young Breed

Triple C's, also known as Carol City Cartel, is an American hip hop group founded by Rick Ross in 2005. The group takes its name from the Carol City neighborhood of Miami Gardens, and consists of Gunplay from Miami, Torch from The Bronx, and Young Breed.

== History ==
They have been featured on Rick Ross' first two albums Port of Miami and Trilla. Additionally, Gunplay appeared on Ross's third studio album Deeper Than Rap. Their first studio album, Custom Cars & Cycles, was released October 27, 2009. In the first week, the album sold 12,100 copies. Gunplay made an appearance on the song "Don't Let Me Go", with former labelmate rapper Pill from Maybach Music Group's 2011 collaboration album Self Made Vol. 1. It is produced by Lee Majors. Torch would also appear on the album's track "Big Bank", featuring Pill, Meek Mill, and Rick Ross. Gunplay would later be featured on two tracks from Self Made Vol. 2 and on Lil Wayne's 2013 album I Am Not a Human Being II.

== Discography ==
=== Studio albums ===
Title	Album details	Peak chart positions			Sales
Title	Album details	US	US R&B	US Rap	Sales
Custom Cars & Cycles	Released: October 27, 2009; Label: Maybach, Def Jam; Format: CD, digital download	44	5	2	US: 12,100
"—" denotes a title that did not chart, or was not released in that territory.
