= Maybach Music Group =

Record label

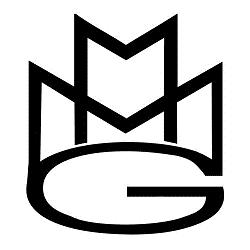
- Parent company: gamma.
- Founded: 2008
- Founder: Rick Ross
- Distributors: gamma. (2023–present); Atlantic Records (2012–2023); Warner Records (2011–2012); Def Jam Recordings (2009–2011)
- Genre: Hip hop
- Country of origin: United States
- Location: Miami, Florida, U.S.
- Official website: mmgselfmade.com (redirect)

Maybach Music Group (MAY-back; (Note: Note that the pronunciation of "Maybach" here is not the same as that of the German car brand; cf. the way the name is pronounced in the label's signature producer tag in songs.) abbreviated MMG) is a record label founded by American rapper Rick Ross in 2008. An imprint of gamma. since 2023, the label was previously an imprint of Def Jam Recordings (2009–2011), Warner Records (2011–2012) and Atlantic Records (2012–2023). The label, having signed artists including Wale, Meek Mill, French Montana, Omarion, Rockie Fresh, and Stalley, has released a total of 29 studio albums, including three compilation albums in its Self-Made series. The "Maybach Music" vocal tag heard in many of the label's recordings is spoken by Australian model Jessica Gomes.

Five of the label's albums have been certified gold by the Recording Industry Association of America (RIAA), while four have been certified platinum. The label has also released seven albums which debuted at number one on the Billboard 200: Deeper Than Rap (2009), God Forgives, I Don't (2012), and Mastermind (2014) by Rick Ross, The Gifted (2013) and The Album About Nothing (2015) by Wale and Dreams Worth More Than Money (2015) and Championships (2018) by Meek Mill.

== History ==
=== 2009–2011 ===
Maybach Music Group (MMG) was launched in a joint venture and as an imprint of Ross' then-label, Def Jam Recordings in 2008. Along with Ross himself, the label signed its first two acts that same year; its first was the hip hop group of which Ross was a member, Triple C's (alongside Gunplay, Torch, and Young Breed), while its second, singer Masspike Miles was signed in November of that year. The label released its first major album, Deeper Than Rap by Ross in April 2009. The Triple C's debut album, Custom Cars & Cycles followed thereafter in October of that year. In August 2009, Ross signed MMG's third act, dancehall singer Magazeen.

In 2010, MMG released Ross' fourth album, Teflon Don. The second album by Triple C's, Color, Cut & Clarity, was scheduled for release that year, but remains unreleased. In August, Ross made an offer to Pennsylvania rapper Wiz Khalifa to sign to Maybach Music Group; however, he was signed with Universal Music Group's competitor label, Atlantic Records.

In February 2011, Ross parted ways with Def Jam as the label's distributor (although he remained signed as a solo act) in favor of Warner Bros. Records, and signed two of MMG's soon-to-be flagship artists: Washington D.C.-based rapper Wale and Philadelphia-based rapper Meek Mill. The following month, on March 25, Ross signed R&B singer Teedra Moses to the label; she was the label's first female artist. On May 23, 2011, MMG released the compilation album Self Made Vol. 1, predominantly featuring Rick Ross alongside the label's roster of whom signed that same year, including Wale, Meek Mill, Teedra Moses, Pill, and Stalley, along with the Triple C's. In June, Ross announced plans to launch the sub-labels Maybach Music Jamaica and Maybach Music Latino, both of which failed to effectively materialize.

=== 2012–present ===
In December 2011, New York rapper French Montana signed a joint venture deal with Maybach Music Group and Sean Combs' Bad Boy Records. His debut studio album, Excuse My French (2013) was released in a joint venture with Interscope Records and executive produced by both Combs and Ross. On February 4, 2012, Ross spoke about the departure of rapper Pill from Maybach Music, and said that Pill was never signed to the label; Pill was signed to its parent label Warner Bros., whose executives proposed the idea of Pill joining. Ross further added that he worked out a one-year deal in which Pill would be signed with the label. On May 2, 2012, Ross signed R&B singer Omarion to the label. MMG's second compilation album, Self Made Vol. 2 was released on June 26, and his fifth album, God Forgives, I Don't was released on July 31.

On June 22, 2012, while promoting Self Made Vol. 2, Rick Ross stated that Gunplay signed a solo deal with the label and Def Jam, further announcing promotional releases from the rapper leading up to his debut album, Living Legend. Rumors of Dom Kennedy and Nipsey Hussle signing to label began to spread during this time, both of which were disavowed by Ross himself, although he admitted to being a fan of the artists. On July 12, 2012, Ross confirmed that rapper Rockie Fresh was signed to MMG; Fresh's debut mixtape with the label, Electric Highway was released on January 21, 2013.

On December 11, 2012, Ross parted ways with Warner Bros. Records as the label's distributor in favor of Atlantic Records. On June 2, 2013, Ross revealed an album cover and announced that MMG will be releasing its third collaboration album, Self Made Vol. 3 on August 6, 2013. The following day, three songs—"Poor Decisions", "God Is Great" and "Oil Money Gang"—were released in promotion for the album. On June 4, 2013, three music videos for each of the songs were uploaded to the label's official YouTube. Self Made Vol. 3 was released to generally positive reviews on September 17, 2013. That same day, Stalley released his first retail project for the label, Honest Cowboy EP. On November 6, 2013, the label signed another Washington D.C.-based rapper and Wale associate, Fat Trel.

== Roster ==
=== Current ===
- Rick Ross (founder)

=== Former ===
- Fat Trel
- French Montana
- Gunplay
- Masspike Miles
- Meek Mill
- Omarion
- Pill
- Rockie Fresh
- Stalley
- Teedra Moses
- Tracy T
- Wale

== Discography ==
The following is a list of albums released through Maybach Music Group, various album distributors are noted below.

Artist	Title	Album details	Peak chart positions				Certifications	Sales
Artist	Title	Album details	US	US R&B	US Rap	CAN	Certifications	Sales
Rick Ross	Deeper Than Rap	Released: April 21, 2009; Label: Maybach, Def Jam, Slip-n-Slide; Format: CD, LP, download	1	1	1	23		439,000
Triple C's	Custom Cars & Cycles	Released: October 27, 2009; Label: Maybach, Def Jam; Format: CD, download	44	5	2	—		48,000
Rick Ross	Teflon Don	Released: July 20, 2010; Label: Maybach, Def Jam, Slip-n-Slide; Format: CD, download	2	2	2	17	RIAA: Platinum	799,000
Maybach Music Group	Self Made Vol. 1	Released: May 23, 2011; Label: Maybach, Warner Bros.; Format: CD, download	5	1	1	—		247,000
Wale	Ambition	Released: November 1, 2011; Label: Maybach, Warner Bros.; Format: CD, download	2	1	1	—	RIAA: Gold	500,000
Maybach Music Group	Self Made Vol. 2	Released: June 26, 2012; Label: Maybach, Warner Bros.; Format: CD, download	4	1	1	37		285,000
Rick Ross	God Forgives, I Don't	Released: July 31, 2012; Label: Maybach, Def Jam, Slip-n-Slide; Format: CD, LP, download	1	1	1	1	RIAA: Gold	570,000
Meek Mill	Dreams and Nightmares	Released: October 30, 2012; Label: Maybach, Warner Bros.; Format: CD, download	2	1	1	6	RIAA: Gold	420,000
French Montana	Excuse My French	Released: May 21, 2013; Label: Maybach, Coke Boys, Interscope, Bad Boy; Format: CD, download	4	1	1	11		162,000
Wale	The Gifted	Released: June 25, 2013; Label: Maybach, Atlantic; Format: CD, download	1	1	1	10		400,000
Maybach Music Group	Self Made Vol. 3	Released: September 17, 2013; Label: Maybach, Atlantic; Label: CD, download	4	1	1	—		114,000
Stalley	Honest Cowboy EP	Released: September 17, 2013; Label: Maybach, Atlantic; Format: Download	—	41	—	—		
Rick Ross	Mastermind	Released: March 4, 2014; Label: Maybach, Def Jam, Slip-n-Slide; Format: CD, download	1	1	1	5		420,000
Stalley	Ohio	Released: October 27, 2014; Label: Maybach, Atlantic; Format: CD, download	35	5	5	—		10,000
Rick Ross	Hood Billionaire	Released: November 24, 2014; Label: Maybach, Def Jam, Slip-n-Slide; Format: CD, download	6	2	2	—		175,000
Omarion	Sex Playlist	Released: December 2, 2014; Label: Maybach, Atlantic; Formats: CD, download	49	5	—	—		44,000
Wale	The Album About Nothing	Released: March 31, 2015; Label: Maybach, Atlantic; Formats: CD, download	1	1	1	—		198,000
Meek Mill	Dreams Worth More Than Money	Released: June 29, 2015; Label: Maybach, Atlantic; Formats: CD, download	1	1	1	1	RIAA: Platinum	800,000
Gunplay	Living Legend	Released: July 31, 2015; Label: Maybach, Def Jam; Formats: CD, download	171	17	11	—		
Rick Ross	Black Market	Released: December 4, 2015; Label: Maybach, Slip-n-Slide, Def Jam; Formats: CD, download	6	2	2	68		85,000
Rick Ross	Rather You Than Me	Released: March 17, 2017; Label: Maybach, Epic; Formats: CD, download, streaming	3	2	2	16		
Wale	Shine	Released: April 28, 2017; Label: Maybach, Atlantic; Formats: CD, download, streaming	16	8	6	—		
Meek Mill	Wins & Losses	Released: July 21, 2017; Label: Maybach, Atlantic; Formats: CD, Download, streaming	3	2	2	17		
Meek Mill	Championship	Released: November 30, 2018; Label: Maybach, Atlantic; Formats: CD, download, streaming	1	1	1	1	RIAA: Platinum	229,000
Rick Ross	Port of Miami 2	Released: August 9, 2019; Label: Maybach, Epic; Formats: CD, download, streaming	2	1	1	8		
Wale	Wow... That's Crazy	Released: October 11, 2019; Label: Maybach, Warner; Format: CD, digital download, streaming	7	6	5	55		
Meek Mill	Expensive Pain	Released: October 1, 2021; Label: Maybach, Atlantic; Format: CD, digital download, streaming	3	2	2	5		
Wale	Folarin II	Released: October 22, 2021; Label: Maybach, Warner; Format: CD, digital download, streaming	22	12	11	—		
Rick Ross	Richer Than I Ever Been	Released: December 10, 2021; Label: Maybach, Epic; Format: CD, digital download, steaming	22	10	5	96		
