= Deeper Than Rap =

Studio album by Rick Ross
- Released: April 21, 2009
- Recorded: 2008–2009
- Genre: Hip hop
- Length: 57:57
- Labels: Maybach; Slip-n-Slide; Def Jam
- Producers: Shakir Stewart; Ted "Touche" Lucas; Khaled Khaled; J.U.S.T.I.C.E. League; The Inkredibles; The Runners; Tricky Stewart; Bigg D; DJ Toomp; Drumma Boy; Bink

Rick Ross chronology
| Trilla (2008) | Deeper Than Rap (2009) | Teflon Don (2010) |

Singles from Deeper Than Rap
- 1. "Mafia Music" Released: January 24, 2009; 2. "Magnificent" Released: February 24, 2009; 3. "All I Really Want" Released: May 5, 2009; 4. "Maybach Music 2" Released: May 19, 2009

Deeper Than Rap is the third album by American rapper Rick Ross. It was released on April 21, 2009, by Maybach Music Group, Slip-n-Slide Records and Def Jam Recordings. Recording sessions for the album took place during 2008 to 2009, with additional production handled by the Inkredibles, the Runners, DJ Toomp and Drumma Boy. Guests on the album include Nas, Avery Storm, Foxy Brown and Ne-Yo, among others. During the album's development, some controversy arose over the release of photos, showing Ross working as a correctional officer during his ongoing feud with rapper 50 Cent.

The album was supported by three singles: "Magnificent" featuring John Legend, "Maybach Music 2" featuring Kanye West, Lil Wayne and T-Pain, and "All I Really Want" featuring the-Dream. A promotional single, "Mafia Music", was released.

Deeper Than Rap received generally positive reviews from music critics and debuted atop the Billboard 200.

== Background ==
In May 2008, Rick Ross announced his plans to begin recording his third album, titled Deeper Than Rap. In addition to this album, Ross also has been working through his several mixtapes, freestyle tracks, and his upcoming collaboration with rapper Birdman, titled The H. In July 2008, during the album's development, the controversy arose over some photographs leaked of Ross (real name William Roberts), which was taken during his career as a correctional officer.

Ross released the street track, titled "Kiss My Pinky Ring Curly", which was intended to attack towards fellow rapper 50 Cent. Ross then mentioned a possible release date of March 24, 2009. In March 2009, the album release date was delayed to April 21, before Ross told MTV News about a possible charity concert for the underprivileged neighborhoods of New York City.

The listening party for this album was held at the Tribeca Grand Hotel in New York City on March 17. Prior to the release day, Ross had asserted in interviews with MTV that this album would be his best during his career. Rick Ross claims that if Get Rich or Die Tryin' (2003) by 50 Cent has sold 10 million copies, then his next record (Deeper Than Rap) would sell 12 million. However, this did not materialize. According to Ross, a feud with 50 Cent started, after he released the track "Mafia Music", which was released online. The album presented personal information about 50 Cent's relationship with the mother of his child.

== Critical reception ==
Professional ratings
Aggregate scores
| Source | Rating |
|---|---|
| Metacritic | 73/100 |
Review scores
| Source | Rating |
| AllMusic | 4/5 stars |
| Entertainment Weekly | B |
| Los Angeles Times | 3/4 stars |
| The New York Times | (favorable) |
| NOW | 4/5 Ns |
| RapReviews | (8.5/10) |
| Rolling Stone | 2.5/5 stars |
| Slant Magazine | 3/5 stars |
| USA Today | 2.5/4 stars |
| Vibe | (favorable) |

Upon its release, Deeper Than Rap received generally positive reviews from most music critics. At Metacritic, which assigns a normalized rating out of 100 to reviews from mainstream critics, the album received an average score of 73, based on 11 reviews, which indicates "generally favorable reviews". AllMusic's David Jeffries commended Ross for his "ability to steamroll over all of his shortcomings," calling it "the superstar, gangster weekend album done right." Adam M. Levin of RapReviews described the album as "essentially a gangster movie on wax, and Ross is excellent in his role as the boss at the top of the heap with nothing to lose but his cool." Jon Caramanica of The New York Times gave Deeper Than Rap a favorable review and perceived it as an improvement over Ross's previous work. On its production and musical style, Caramanica wrote "this album is lush, erotic, entitled, a stunning leisure-class document of easy wealth and carefree sex. It’s a throwback to a time of sonic and attitudinal ambition in hip-hop — the Bad Boy era of the mid- to late ’90s, with its warm soul samples connoting the new hip-hop luxury comes to mind. Few rap albums have sounded this assured, this sumptuous, in years".

Wilson McBee of Slant Magazine gave credit to Ross for showing more lyrical depth in his lyrics but found the R&B midpoint in the album to lead Ross "closer to being Flo Rida's fat uncle than Jay-Z's second in command." He concluded that, "Phony or not, Ross has planted himself near the center of hip-hop's orbit, and Deeper proves that it's going to take more than YouTube beefs and blogger scandal-mongering to move him out of the way." Steve Jones of USA Today felt that even with the beats, imposing charisma and huge guest list, Ross didn't deviate far enough from the typical rap themes he told before in previous efforts, saying that "His tales of gangster riches are colorful, but you wish Ross would find something deeper to talk about." Christian Hoard of Rolling Stone felt that Ross' formula of shiny beats that supply tracks telling rap lifestyle stories was tiring, saying that "over the length of a full album it all feels a bit too familiar."

== Commercial performance ==
In the United States, Deeper Than Rap debuted at number one on the US Billboard 200, selling 158,000 copies during its first week, becoming Ross's third album to debut at number one. In its second week, the album dropped to number four on the chart, selling 51,125 copies. In its third week, the album dropped to number eight on the chart, selling 34,828 copies that week. In its fourth week, the album moved down to number nine on the chart, selling 26,487 copies, bring its four-week total to 270,000 copies. After seven weeks, the album had sold 315,385 copies in the US. As of August 2010, the album sold 439,000 copies in the United States.

== Track listing ==
| No. | Title | Writer(s) | Producer(s) | Length |
|---|---|---|---|---|
| 1. | "Mafia Music" | William Roberts II; Johnny Mollings; Leigh Elliott; Lenny Mollings; Maurice Carpenter | The Inkredibles | 4:16 |
| 2. | "Maybach Music 2" (featuring Kanye West, Lil Wayne and T-Pain) | Roberts II; Dwayne Carter, Jr.; Erik Ortiz; Faheem Najm; Kanye West; Kevin Crowe; Dexter Wansel | J.U.S.T.I.C.E. League | 4:59 |
| 3. | "Magnificent" (featuring John Legend) | Robert II; Angela Bofill; Ortiz; John Stephens; Crowe; Jeffrey Cohen; Michael Walden | J.U.S.T.I.C.E. League | 4:17 |
| 4. | "Yacht Club" (featuring Magazeen) | Robert II; Ortiz; Crowe; Johnny Pate | J.U.S.T.I.C.E. League | 5:14 |
| 5. | "Usual Suspects" (featuring Nas and Kevin Cossom) | Robert II; J. Mollings; Kevin Cossom; Elliott; L. Mollings; Carpenter; Nasir Jones | The Inkredibles | 5:14 |
| 6. | "All I Really Want" (featuring the-Dream) | Robert II; Christopher "Tricky" Stewart; Terius Nash | Stewart | 4:16 |
| 7. | "Rich Off Cocaine" (featuring Avery Storm) | Robert II; Ortiz; Crowe; Ralph DiStasio; Willie Hutch | J.U.S.T.I.C.E. League | 4:25 |
| 8. | "Lay Back" (featuring Robin Thicke) | Robert II; Andre Davidson; Andrew Harr; Jermaine Jackson; Karlyn Ramsey; Cossom; Shawn Davidson | The Runners; The Monarch (add.); Cossom (co.) | 4:02 |
| 9. | "Murda Mami" (featuring Foxy Brown) | Robert II; Derrick Baker; Inga Marchand | Bigg D | 3:34 |
| 10. | "Gunplay" (featuring Gunplay) | Robert II; J. Mollings; Elliott; L. Mollings; Carpenter; Richard Morales | The Inkredibles | 3:34 |
| 11. | "Bossy Lady" (featuring Ne-Yo) | Robert II; Harr; Jackson; Cossom; Shaffer Smith | The Runners | 3:53 |
| 12. | "Face" (featuring Trina) | Robert II; Christopher Gholson | Drumma Boy | 3:14 |
| 13. | "Valley of Death" | Robert II; Aldrin Davis; Kevin "Khao" Cates; Latonya Givens; Marcus Coleman; Barry White | DJ Toomp; Khao | 3:54 |
| 14. | "In Cold Blood" | Robert II; Harr; Jackson | The Runners | 3:05 |

iTunes bonus track
| No. | Title | Writer(s) | Producer(s) | Length |
|---|---|---|---|---|
| 15. | "Cigar Music" (featuring Masspike Miles) | Robert II; Roosevelt Harrell III; Frederick Jones; Danny Leake; Richard Evans; Morris Jenkins | Bink! | 4:00 |

Sample credits

- "Maybach Music 2" contains a sample of "Time Is the Teacher" performed by Dexter Wansel.
- "Magnificent" contains a sample of "Gotta Make It Up to You" performed by Angela Bofill.
- "Yacht Club" contains a sample of "El Jardia" performed by Johnny Pate.
- "Usual Suspects" contains a sample of "Garden of Peace" performed by Lonnie Liston Smith and "Dead Presidents II" performed by Jay-Z.
- "Rich Off Cocaine" contains a sample of "Color Her Sunshine" performed by Willie Hutch.
- "Valley of Death" contains a sample of "I'm So Blue and You Are Too" performed by Barry White.
- "Cigar Music" contains a sample of "Don't Ask My Neighbor" performed by Ahmad Jamal, written by Frederick Jones, Danny Leake, Richard Evans and Morris Jenkins,.

== Personnel ==
- Rick Ross – vocals
- Musa "Milk" Adeoye – A&R
- David L. Anderson II – keyboards
- J.D. Anderson – drums
- Chris Athens – mastering
- Alexander Bethune – A&R
- Adam Beyrer – engineer
- Leslie Brathwaite – mixing
- Robin Thicke – vocals
- Foxy Brown – vocals
- Josh "Redd" Burke – A&R
- Kevin Cates – producer
- Marcus Coleman – programming
- Kevin Cossom – vocals (background), producer
- Ben Diehl – engineer
- Anthony Gallo – engineer
- Tom Gardner – assistant engineer
- Latonya "Tone Trezure" Givens – writer, singer
- Javon Greene – A&R
- Jay Jones – bass
- Terese Joseph – A&R
- Justice League – producer
- David Karmiol – guitar, talk box
- K.C. – vocals
- Kali Khaled – executive producer, A&R
- Giancarlo Lino – mixing assistant
- Ted Lucas – executive producer
- Magazeen – vocals
- Jonathan Mannion – photography
- Deborah Mannis-Gardner – sample clearance
- The Monarch – producer
- Dave Pensado – mixing
- Lasim Richards – trombone
- Rashawn Ross – trumpet
- Rick Ross – executive producer
- The Runners – producer
- TaVon Sampson – art direction, design
- Ray Seay – mixing
- Derrick Selby – engineer
- Chris "Tricky" Stewart – producer
- Shakir Stewart – executive producer
- Jeff "Supa Jeff" Villanueva – engineer, digital editing
- Kris Yiengst – art coordinator, photo coordination

== Charts ==
=== Weekly charts ===
| Chart (2009) | Peak position |
|---|---|
| Canadian Albums (Billboard) | 23 |
| US Billboard 200 | 1 |
| US Top R&B/Hip-Hop Albums (Billboard) | 3 |
| US Top Rap Albums (Billboard) | 3 |

=== Year-end charts ===
| Chart (2009) | Position |
|---|---|
| US Billboard 200 | 80 |
| US Top R&B/Hip-Hop Albums (Billboard) | 14 |
| US Top Rap Albums (Billboard) | 5 |

== See also ==
- List of Billboard 200 number-one albums of 2009
