= Touch'N You =

Single by Rick Ross featuring Usher

from the album God Forgives, I Don't
- Released: May 22, 2012
- Recorded: 2011
- Genre: Hip hop; southern hip hop; R&B
- Length: 4:12
- Label: Maybach Music Group; Def Jam; Warner Bros. Records
- Songwriters: Richard Butler, Jr.; Pierre Medor; Roberts II; Usher Raymond IV
- Producers: Rico Love; Pierre Medor

Rick Ross singles chronology
"Born Stunna" (2012)	"Touch'N You" (2012)	"So Sophisticated" (2012)

Usher singles chronology
"Lemme See" (2012)	"Touch'N You" (2012)	"Numb" (2012)

"Touch'N You" is a song by American rapper Rick Ross, featuring vocals from American singer Usher. It was released as the first single from his fifth studio album, God Forgives, I Don't on May 22, 2012. The song was produced by Rico Love and Pierre Medor. The music video was directed by Chris Robinson and features Omarion, Wale, DJ Khaled, actress and model Tae Heckard as Ross's leading lady.

== Background and conception ==
On January 4, 2011, in an interview with the radio show "The Breakfast Club" (broadcast on the station Power 105), Rick Ross revealed that he planned to release an album titled God Forgives, I Don't. Ross released the album's original first two singles – "You the Boss", a collaboration with fellow rapper Nicki Minaj, and "I Love My Bitches" – on October 4, 2011. Both songs received a moderate amount of airplay on urban contemporary radio stations in the United States, with the former peaking at number 62 on the US Billboard Hot 100 and the latter at number 72 on the US Hot R&B/Hip-Hop Songs chart. Ross originally planned to release God Forgives, I Don't on December 13, 2011, but after Ross suffered seizures on two separate flights between Fort Lauderdale and the University of Memphis (where he was due to perform) on October 14, 2011, he was briefly hospitalized, and the album's release was indefinitely delayed. After he left hospital, Ross began to record new material for God Forgives, I Don't: as a result, neither "You the Boss" or "I Love My Bitches" appears on the album's final track listing. Media reports also speculated that "Stay Schemin'", a collaboration with rappers Drake and French Montana originally released as a single from Ross' mixtape Rich Forever, was to be re-purposed as the first single from God Forgives, I Don't: however, it does not appear on the album.

Whilst Ross was recording new material for God Forgives, I Don't, American record producer and songwriter Rico Love played several productions to Spiff TV, the Artists and repertoire manager for Maybach Music Group, Ross' record label, with the intention of playing Ross a production that the late rapper The Notorious B.I.G. would have recorded were he still alive. On the advice of Spiff TV and fellow rapper Mase, who also listened to the productions, Love played the production that would eventually be used for "Touch'N You" to Ross, who decided upon hearing it that it would be used for God Forgives, I Don't's first single. "Touch'N You" was distributed to digital retailers by Def Jam Recordings on May 22, 2012.

== Music video ==
The music video was released on June 19, 2012. It was directed by Chris Robinson.

As of March 2024, the music video has 20 million views.

== Track listing ==
Digital download

1. "Touch'N You" (featuring Usher) – 4:12

== Charts ==
=== Weekly charts ===
Chart (2012)	Peak position
US Bubbling Under Hot 100 Singles (Billboard)	2
US Hot R&B/Hip-Hop Songs (Billboard)	15
US Hot Rap Songs (Billboard)	15

=== Year-end charts ===
Chart (2012)	Position
US Hot R&B/Hip-Hop Songs (Billboard)	72

== Release history ==
Country	Date	Format	Label	Ref
United States	May 22, 2012	Digital download	The Island Def Jam Music Group	
United States	May 29, 2012	Urban radio	The Island Def Jam Music Group	
United States	June 26, 2012	Rhythmic radio	The Island Def Jam Music Group	
