= God Forgives, I Don't =

2012 studio album by Rick Ross

Studio album by Rick Ross
- Released: July 30, 2012
- Recorded: 2011–2012
- Studios: Carrington House (Atlanta); Circle House; Swisher Suite (Miami); Conway (Los Angeles); Da Boom Boom (Burbank); Goin Federal (Seattle); Homeschool; Jungle City; Roc the Mic (New York City); Kool World (Luton)
- Genre: Hip-hop
- Length: 68:27
- Labels: Maybach; Slip-n-Slide; Def Jam
- Producers: The Beat Bully; Cardiak; Cool & Dre; DVLP; G5Kid; Got Koke; J.U.S.T.I.C.E. League; Jake One; Kenoe; Pharrell Williams; Pierre Medor; Reefa; Rico Love; Young Shun

Rick Ross chronology
Teflon Don (2010)	God Forgives, I Don't (2012)	Mastermind (2014)

Deluxe edition cover

Singles from God Forgives, I Don't
- 1. "Touch'N You" Released: May 22, 2012; 2. "So Sophisticated" Released: June 5, 2012; 3. "Hold Me Back" Released: July 2, 2012; 4. "Diced Pineapples" Released: August 21, 2012

God Forgives, I Don't is the fifth studio album by American rapper Rick Ross. It was released on July 30, 2012, by Maybach Music Group, Slip-n-Slide Records and Def Jam Recordings. The album was produced by several record producers, including Cool & Dre, J.U.S.T.I.C.E. League, Pharrell, Jake One, and Rico Love, among others.

God Forgives, I Don't received generally positive reviews from critics, who complimented its opulent production style and Ross' performance. It debuted at number one on the US Billboard 200, selling 218,000 copies in its first week, and charted in several other countries. By October 2012, the album had been certified gold by the Recording Industry Association of America and had sold 588,000 copies in the United States. It was nominated for Best Rap Album at the 2013 Grammy Awards.

== Background and development ==
Rick Ross revealed the title of the album on January 4, 2011, during an interview with the Breakfast Club, along with the first promotional single "Made Men" featuring Drake. A music video for "Made Men" was later released on April 11, 2011. In July 2011, DJ Khaled spoke about the album, saying: "God Forgives, I Don't is a classic-in-the-making. Let me tell you something right now: This album is so crazy from the beginning of what I've been in the studio hearing already," he said. "I can't give you too much because I'm going to let him do that, because that's his project, but I could tell you right now it's classic and he is talking that talk." In September 2011, Drake spoke on the album during an interview with MTV saying: "That God Forgives I Don't; the only way I can describe it, it's like Snoop Dogg's Doggystyle, The Notorious B.I.G.'s Ready to Die, or Clipse's Lord Willin' or any of the albums that I collected and held on to as a kid – whether it was cassette or CD." Rick Ross revealed that he wanted to collaborate with Lionel Richie on the album. Rick Ross spoke about the album during an interview with MTV on October 11, 2011, at the BET Hip Hop Awards saying: "Me making my album is just a real tedious process that I go through and the response from the people that I did play a few records for, the feedback is incredible" and he also spoke on his collaboration with Mary J. Blige. "That's the Queen. I can just tell you about the experience," he said. "We actually worked in Michael Jackson's L.A. studio and we made some magic." Mary J. Blige also spoke of the experience with XXL in September 2011, clarifying that the two actually recorded in the last studio that Michael Jackson ever recorded in. "It's a private studio that one of our friends, he was really close to Michael Jackson, he let us use it," Mary said. "It's actually Marvin Gaye's studio. It has murals of Michael Jackson all over the walls and Marvin Gaye. That was the last place Michael actually worked at before he passed. It's such a good vibe." In an October 2011, interview with hip-hop magazine XXL, Bun B confirmed that he would appear on God Forgives, I Don't, but did not make the final cut of the album. In October 2011, the first video log of the making of God Forgives, I Don't was released, and featured The Alchemist, in a studio session released by Rick Ross.

On October 4, 2011, Ross appeared on the radio station Hot 97; during an interview with Funkmaster Flex, he premiered two promotional singles for God Forgives, I Don't, titled "You the Boss" and "I Love My Bitches". Ross would later announce neither song would make the album. Funkmaster Flex interviewed Ross on topics such as his beef with Kreayshawn and Young Jeezy, along with details of the album, however Ross declined to divulge information on the album, preferring to keep details of the project under wraps. Two days later on October 6, 2011, Ross appeared on the Breakfast Club to promote the album. Ross maintained his tight-lipped approach of not divulging details of God Forgives, I Don't. Later on October 6, 2011, Rick Ross along with Def Jam Recordings held the official GFID Conference Call, to discuss the album and have Ross answer questions. When callers of the music industry asked questions on producers and features of the album, Ross declined to answer, stating that recording God Forgives, I Don't was still in process and did not wish to disclose too many details of the album, preferring to open up about the album as the release date nears. Ross emphasized that less features would be on the album, as opposed to previous releases, as well as creating the album with a "90s Vintage hip-hop sound". In January 2012, Ross spoke about working with Dr. Dre, saying that Dre "highly influenced" his work. Ross confirmed that he and Dre collaborated on records for God Forgives, I Don't as well as Dr. Dre's long-delayed album Detox.

In April 2012, while on his European Tour, Ross explained the reasoning for the album title, saying: "I wanted to approach [this album] like Scorsese would have approached a film. I wanted it to be a bold statement, a dark statement and have music to tell the story behind it. It felt like a film." During his July promo tour, Ross elaborated, "I knew approaching this album, I wanted to approach titling it a lot different from previous albums. I wanted it to be strong and impactful. The first half is God Forgives: It's a lot of us need forgiveness. That's the beautiful side that alotta people need to focus on, even myself. I Don't represented the street aspect of life. I feel we have both sides that we deal with in life. I gave 'em one of those feelings that it was a motion picture, a masterpiece, five-star. That's the way I broke it down. They gon' hear the energy and see exactly what I'm talkin 'bout 'cause we gotta face both sides in life." Ross also confirmed Jay-Z as a featured artist.

After much anticipation and an initial push back, Ross announced that the album would be released on July 31, 2012, at an MMG Press Conference on May 2, 2012. He also announced that no previously released singles, or material from his Rich Forever mixtape would be on the album, saying the album would be "100% new". Ross stated that the album would be his most complete and best body of work yet. At the press conference, Ross spoke a bit on the album, saying: "God Forgives, I Don't is a very dark story. It's extremely lyrical, the music is next level. I'm expecting nothing but the biggest results. The collaborations will surprise you guys. This album is the missing part of my legacy. This is gonna put me over the top." Ross ended the press conference stating, "I will deliver". On June 12, 2012, Ross released the official album artwork in a video promoting the album. On June 30, the official deluxe cover was released via Rap-Up.

In a July 2012, interview with MTV News, Ross previewed his album. Ross spoke on the title, the cover, the recording process, the cinematic influence, and a few tracks. Ross stated that several photos were shot inside a church. He elaborated saying, "I remember sitting in the church just waiting for the photographer, and I remember sitting in there praying, just being thankful. I knew I wanted to have 10 Jesus pieces on. Of course, one Jesus piece was always fly, but I just wanted 10. I just wanted to go to that next level." Ross stated that he kept an extremely small circle during the entire recording process. "I keep my circle extremely small when it comes to me recording my music. I put the music together before I even put the words to the music, because I feel it's easier for me to write the words and make it fit the music versus me finding music that can fit my words." Ross has stated numerous times how he has compared this album to films, and has taken a cinematic approach during the entire development of the album. Ross expanded by saying "This may be Inglourious Basterds, man. We gonna peel your scalp back on this one. Quentin Tarantino, that's one of the vibes I was in when I titled the album. I wanted to approach it like a film." Ross also spoke on the concepts of a few tracks from the album. Ross said the track "Amsterdam" was based on the red light district, "I kinda flipped it where being a boss you gotta get approval for a green light. I'm one of those people you can't green light. As long I've been in this game, there's been a lot of talk, but ain't nobody stepped on these 11 and a half's. The reason being: This is the red light district, you can't move on this side." Rozay had spoken about the track "Diced Pineapples" as well, saying that "When I got out of the hospital — you know, I had a seizure last year — when I was leaving, the doctor told me, 'You gotta eat some more fruit, drink you some water, eat fruit and just relax for a little while.' My fruit of choice was pineapples. For the next three weeks, I woke up every morning and ate diced pineapples, and I put the concept together. Drizzy came in, as well as Wale, and it's kinda like, 'She could be my diced pineapple. This special lady, she could be what I wake up to every morning and help me get by every day." Rick Ross described the album in five words with: classic, untouchable, boss, success, and revenge. He stated, "If you doubted us being here three years ago, five years ago, you don't understand hip-hop, you don't understand the power of rap music."

In a July 2012, interview with the Breakfast Club, Ross was asked about his collaboration with André 3000 for the song "Sixteen". He stated that he had spoken with André 3000 through Skype numerous times, while Andre had been filming overseas for the Jimi Hendrix biopic, All Is by My Side, and the record was completed over Skype. Ross elaborated that he wanted to make a special track that had an "Outkast-ish vibe", and hinted at an upcoming video for the song. Ross also spoke to Vibe about working with Dr. Dre saying, "I got to be in the studio with him and watch him turn those knobs which has been a dream of mine since Straight Out of Compton and I just wanted to ask him. When I'm listening to those Chronic skits, that was the end of skits like The Chronic or a Snoop album."

== Songs ==
The first track, "Pray for Us", is an excerpt from the movie Baby Boy, in which the actors Omar Gooding and Tyrese Gibson pray for forgiveness for the sins they will commit in the future: the excerpt ends with the sound of gunfire. "Pirates" features a backing track consisting of pianos and "bombastic drum hits", with Ross reflecting on the success he has achieved, the hardships he suffered in his early life and the artists who have inspired him, including the late The Notorious B.I.G. "3 Kings", a collaboration with fellow rappers Dr. Dre and Jay-Z, was felt to be the album's intended centerpiece by many critics, due to the high-profile nature of the artists involved. Backed by a "dusty-and-soulful" provided by producer Jake One, whose production typically contains "analog warmth", the song is a "rags-to-riches" story in which Dre and Ross discuss their life before fame: Dre observes how he "started out mopping floors, but now he's front row at the awards". Jay-Z, meanwhile, discusses major events in his life since he became a celebrity, including a $150 million deal with concert-promotion company Live Nation, and the birth of his daughter, Blue Ivy Carter. "Ashamed" is a "plush luxury rap", as described by Jayson Greene of Pitchfork, in which Ross observes and attempts to justify the lives of drug dealers, and he also recalls difficulties his mother encountered due to her low-paying career. The track's instrumentation is built around a sample of the Wilson Pickett song "Shameless".

"Maybach Music IV", the album's fifth track, is the fourth song of a series which began on Ross' second album, Trilla (2008), and has since featured artists such Kanye West, T.I. and Erykah Badu. Unlike the previous entries in the series, the song contains only a single guest, singer-songwriter Ne-Yo, who performs the song's chorus. Production group J.U.S.T.I.C.E. League, who have worked with Ross many times in the past, created the song's production; it contains "spiraling" electric guitars and synth sounds, and bears similarities to the previous entry of the series, "Maybach Music III", particularly in the elements of jazz fusion both songs incorporate. L.A. Reid, the chief executive of Def Jam, also makes an uncredited appearance on the song. Ross supposedly "laughs in the face of death", according to Drew Beringer of AbsolutePunk, with the lyric "get a blowjob, have a seizure on the Lear", which is a reference to the two near-fatal seizures Ross suffered in 2011. Beringer cited the song as an example of Ross balancing the reflection and more indulgent themes he frequently employs on the album to give "stellar tracks", going on to call "Maybach Music IV" and the following song "Sixteen" a "stunning one-two punch" of such balance execution. "Sixteen", the longest song on the album at eight minutes and sixteen seconds, is also produced by J.U.S.T.I.C.E. League. The elegant, "smooth as silk" backing track also contains influences of jazz, as well as cymbal downbeats, saxophone sounds, string instruments and a guitar solo, performed by fellow rapper André 3000, who also provides vocals on the song. The backing track bears stylistic similarities to André 3000's own single "Prototype" (2004). The song's title alludes to the idea, discussed by both Ross and André 3000 in their lyrics, that a traditional sixteen bar verse is not long enough to get across the ideas they wish to.

== Release and promotion ==
On December 24, 2010, Ross released a mixtape titled Ashes to Ashes in promotion of the album, including the song "9 Piece" featuring T.I. Following T.I.'s legal trouble, Ross scrapped T.I. from the song and instead released a remix to "9 Piece" featuring Lil Wayne; it was released on April 4, 2011, which was used as the album's first street single. "9 Piece" was released to iTunes on May 10, and debuted at number 61 on the Billboard Hot 100. On October 4, 2011, Rick Ross released his first two promotional singles. The album's promotional single was "You the Boss" featuring Nicki Minaj, and the album's second promotional single was, titled "I Love My Bitches" produced by Just Blaze. Three days later on October 7, both tracks were released on iTunes for purchase. In October 2011, Ross published the first promotional picture of God Forgives, I Don't on his Tumblr page, which showed a release date of December 13, 2011. On November 1, 2011, Rick Ross and Wale appeared on BET's 106 & Park to help promote Wale's new album, Ambition, which was released under Ross' Maybach Music imprint. Ross also promoted his own LP, God Forgives, I Don't. It was Ross' first television appearance since his reported seizures on October 14, 2011. Ross announced that he, and Jay-Z had completed a collaboration track for the album, which Rick called "the biggest record we've ever done together".

On November 16, 2011, Ross appeared on MTV's Rap Fix to promote Wale's Ambition album, as well as to give details on his own album. Rick Ross said that the December 13 date was still tentative, but the album was likely to be pushed back to a 2012 release because of the health scare he suffered in October. Ross expanded by saying that because he was resting due to doctors orders, he was unable to work and had to postpone the groundwork of his album, which he felt was highly important. Consequently, Def Jam Records and Ross' own Maybach Music Group label had scaled back promotion of the album. Ross added that he felt he could make the December 13 date he had originally set, but felt it was in his best interest to push the album back to 2012 in order to create the best possible body of work. On January 6, 2012, Rick Ross released the mixtape Rich Forever to help promote the album. The tape contained all new material and features from the likes of Diddy, 2 Chainz, Wale, Meek Mill, John Legend, Nas, Drake and French Montana, among others. Two standout tracks from the mixtape, "Triple Beam Dreams" featuring Nas and "Rich Forever" featuring John Legend would later be remastered and included as bonus tracks on the deluxe version of the album.

On July 16, 2012, Ross along with Maybach Music Group, began the GFID Promo Tour, appearing on radio shows and doing interviews to promote the album. The promo tour traveled to Virginia, Delaware, Philadelphia, Cleveland, Detroit, Toledo, and New York. On August 2, 2012, the music video was released for "911". On August 14, 2012, the music video was released for "Amsterdam". On September 10, 2012, the music video was released for "Presidential" featuring Elijah Blake. On October 9, 2012, the music video was released for "Diced Pineapples" featuring Drake and Wale. On December 7, 2012, the music video was released for "Ten Jesus Pieces" featuring Stalley. On January 20, 2013, the music video was released for "Pirates". On March 4, 2013, the music video was released for "Ashamed". On April 22, 2013, the music video was released for "Ice Cold" featuring Omarion.

== Singles ==
On May 15, 2012, the first single from the album, "Touch'N You" featuring Usher was released. In May 2012, Rico Love, who produced and wrote the hook of the song, spoke with XXL to discuss the making of the record. He stated the track had been completed relatively quickly. While Ross was recording new material for God Forgives, I Don't, American record producer and songwriter Rico Love played several productions to Spiff TV, the artists and repertoire manager for Maybach Music Group, Ross' record label, with the intention of playing Ross a production that the late rapper The Notorious B.I.G. would have recorded were he still alive. On the advice of Spiff TV and fellow rapper Mase, who also listened to the productions, Love played the production that would eventually be used for "Touch'N You" to Ross, who decided upon hearing it that it would be used for God Forgives, I Don't's first single. The song was distributed to digital retailers by Def Jam Recordings on May 22, 2012. On June 19, 2012, the music video was released for "Touch'N You" featuring Usher. Rico Love described the record as "Basically the record is an ode to women. A sexy song, an 'I been thinking about you all day' type song. A man telling a woman how bad he wants to touch her, feel her, be intimate with her. Ross puts it in a way, even the street dudes who don't feel comfortable expressing themselves, feel comfortable with that. It's a club banger and a radio smash. I'm excited for Ross because I feel it has the potential to be a radio banger.

On May 21, 2012, Funkmaster Flex premiered the second single, "So Sophisticated" featuring Meek Mill. On June 24, 2012, the music video was released for "So Sophisticated" featuring Meek Mill. The third single "Hold Me Back" was released on July 2, 2012. On July 25, 2012, the music video was released for "Hold Me Back". In July 2012, Ross spoke on the concept of "Hold Me Back" with MTV News, saying "That's the struggle, the angle I wanted to take on that record once again from somebody who may not have much, but that don't determine where you end up in the game. From struggle to triumph, as long as you stay loyal with your clique and your family, you can overcome whatever. That's how I feel." It was ranked number 32 in Complex's 50 Best Songs of 2012 list. On July 19, 2012, Funkmaster Flex premiered one of the more anticipated tracks of the album, "3 Kings" featuring rap icons Dr. Dre and Jay Z. In an interview with DJ Semtex, Ross stated that The D.O.C. had introduced him to Dr. Dre, who then flew to Miami to work with Ross. They had created several records, one of which was "3 Kings". Ross had already completed a track with Jay Z for the album, but decided he wanted Jay Z on a track with Dre to have three kings on one record, hence the title "3 Kings". A music video was supposed to be filmed by André 3000 for his track with Ross "Sixteen" but Andre later revealed he no longer had the time to make it so it wouldn't be released.

== Critical reception ==
Professional ratings
Aggregate scores
Source	Rating
AnyDecentMusic?	6.9/10
Metacritic	70/100
Review scores
Source	Rating
AllMusic	4/5 stars
The A.V. Club	B−
Entertainment Weekly	A−
Los Angeles Times	3/4 stars
NME	6/10
Pitchfork	6.8/10
Rolling Stone	4/5 stars
Slant Magazine	4/5 stars
Spin	7/10
XXL	4/5

God Forgives, I Don't was met with generally positive reviews. At Metacritic, which assigns a normalized rating out of 100 to reviews from professional publications, the album received an average score of 70, based on 24 reviews. Aggregator AnyDecentMusic? gave it 6.9 out of 10, based on their assessment of the critical consensus.

AllMusic's David Jeffries dubbed it Ross' third "lavish triumph in a row" and stated, "All of it works, there's plenty of ambition with little overreaching, and the most striking bits of the album are striking for unexpected reasons." Kyle Anderson of Entertainment Weekly found the album's "size and scope ... undeniable" and cited it as "the first album that really feels like it was made by a boss." Jaeki Cho of XXL commented that Ross' "façade" of "hubris and delusion" make the music "irresistibly entertaining." BBC Music's Mike Diver asserted that the album "represents a game-changer" and found its "big-budget rap" tracks to be "point[ing] to further success".

Mikael Wood of the Los Angeles Times called the album "commanding" and "complicated", and wrote that "he's succeeded by becoming too big to fail." Rick Florino of Artistdirect praised the album as "gritty", "guttural", and "cinematic", and found Ross to be "on par with Nas and Biggie Smalls." Jonah Weiner of Rolling Stone complimented Ross' "unburdening rap from the tyranny of realness" and commented that "there are times when God Forgives is as engrossing and surprising as rap can be." Slant Magazine's Jesse Cataldo commended Ross for surprisingly "continuing to find new ways to describe his largesse", and characterized the album as "silly, completely gauche, and still pretty impressive ... [a] massive exercise in excess." Consequence of Sound's Mike Madden commented that the album "adds fascinating realism and reflection to Ross' usual over-the-top gusto."

In a mixed review, Louise Brailey of NME found the album's tone too "serious" and wrote that "only '911' continues the gilded legacy of Teflon Don". Jon Caramanica of The New York Times criticized that "Ross goes for grand gestures that don't serve him well" and called it "his least tonally consistent album, both in music and in content. An aimlessness and lethargy seeps into too many of these songs". Evan Rytlewski of The A.V. Club felt that Ross "comes across as a softened version of his usually unrestrained character" and that the album "rarely shocks or excites." Jordan Sargent of The Village Voice called the album an "inarguable misstep" and commented that it "indulges [Ross'] worst tendencies, in the process rewinding time back an era when Ross was merely a big presence with bigger guests and even bigger beats." Pitchfork's Jayson Greene observed some "higher-profile misfires" and commented that the album "feels depressingly earthbound" in comparison to his previous albums.

=== Industry awards ===
Awards and nominations for God Forgives, I Don't
Year	Ceremony	Category	Result	Ref.
2013	Billboard Music Awards	Top Rap Album	Nominated	
2013	Grammy Awards	Best Rap Album	Nominated	

== Commercial performance ==
God Forgives, I Don't debuted at number one on the US Billboard 200, selling 218,000 copies in its first week. It is Ross' fourth number-one album in the US. In its second week, the album dropped to number two on the chart, selling 60,000 copies. In its third week, the album dropped to number three on the chart, selling 43,000 copies that week. In its fourth week, the album dropped to number eight on the chart, selling 28,000 copies, bringing the album's four-week total sales to 349,000 copies. On September 12, 2012, the album was certified gold by the Recording Industry Association of America, for shipments of 500,000 copies in the United States. As of November 2013, the album has sold 555,000 copies in the US.

The album was Ross' first album to chart in the United Kingdom, where it peaked at number eight on the UK Albums Chart.

== Track listing ==
Credits adapted from the album's liner notes.

God Forgives, I Don't track listing
No.	Title	Writer(s)	Producer(s)	Length
1.	"Pray for Us"	John Singleton		0:59
2.	"Pirates"	William Roberts II; Maurice Jordan; Matthew Furdge; William Bell; Booker Jones	Kenoe; Got Koke	3:25
3.	"3 Kings" (featuring Dr. Dre and Jay-Z)	Roberts II; Jacob Dutton; Shawn Carter; Clara Shepherd; James Weary; Andre Young	Jake One	4:26
4.	"Ashamed"	Roberts II; Marcello Valenzano; Andre Lyon; Anthony Colton; Wilson Pickett; Jean Roussel; Marty Simon	Cool & Dre	4:19
5.	"Maybach Music IV" (featuring Ne-Yo)	Roberts II; Erik Ortiz; Kevin Crowe; Kenny Bartolomei; Shaffer Smith	J.U.S.T.I.C.E. League	5:14
6.	"Sixteen" (featuring André 3000)	Roberts II; Ortiz; Crowe; Bartolomei; André Benjamin	J.U.S.T.I.C.E. League	8:18
7.	"Amsterdam"	Roberts II; Carl McCormick; Alain Mion; Alain Gandolfi	Cardiak	3:46
8.	"Hold Me Back"	Roberts II; James Murphy	G5Kid	4:30
9.	"911"	Roberts II; Roshun Walker	Young Shun	5:29
10.	"So Sophisticated" (featuring Meek Mill)	Roberts II; Anthony Tucker; Jordan; Jermaine Preyan; Robert Williams	The Beat Bully	4:10
11.	"Presidential" (featuring Elijah Blake)	Roberts II; Pharrell Williams; Roy Ayers; James Bedford; Lamont Porter; Sylvia Striplin; Kimberly Jones; Christopher Wallace; Sean Fenton	Pharrell Williams	4:14
12.	"Ice Cold" (featuring Omarion)	Roberts II; Omari Grandberry; Samuel Dew; Sharif Slater	Reefa	3:51
13.	"Touch'N You" (featuring Usher)	Richard Butler, Jr.; Pierre Medor; Roberts II	Rico Love; Pierre Medor	4:16
14.	"Diced Pineapples" (featuring Wale and Drake)	Roberts II; McCormick; Olubowale Akintimehin; Aubrey Graham	Cardiak	4:39
15.	"Ten Jesus Pieces" (featuring Stalley)	Roberts II; Ortiz; Crowe; Bartolomei; Kyle Myricks; Jeffrey Osborne; Leon Franklin	J.U.S.T.I.C.E. League	6:51
Total length:				68:27

Deluxe edition (bonus tracks)
No.	Title	Writer(s)	Producer(s)	Length
16.	"Triple Beam Dreams" (featuring Nas)	Roberts II; Ortiz; Crowe; Bartolomei; Nasir Jones	J.U.S.T.I.C.E. League	4:41
17.	"Rich Forever" (featuring John Legend)	Roberts II; John Stephens; Bigram Zayas; Matthew DelGiorno; Stephen Hacker; Kevin Cossom	DVLP; Filthy^{[a]}	4:53
Total length:				78:01

Notes

- ^{^[a]} signifies a co-producer
- "3 Kings" features additional background vocals by JoiStaRR
- "Presidential" features background vocals by Shateria Moragne-el

Sample credits

- "Pray for Us" contains a sound excerpt from the motion picture Baby Boy using the likeness of Omar Gooding.
- "Pirates" contains a sample of "I Forgot To Be Your Lover", performed by The Mad Lads.
- "3 Kings" contains a sample of "I'm So Grateful (Keep in Touch)", performed by Crown of Glory.
- "Ashamed" contains a sample of "Shameless", performed by Wilson Pickett.
- "Amsterdam" contains a sample of "Prelude A (30 Round)", performed by Cortex.
- "Presidential" contains an interpolation of "Get Money", performed by Junior M.A.F.I.A. featuring The Notorious B.I.G.
- "Ten Jesus Pieces" contains a sample of "Baby", performed by Jeffrey Osborne.

== Charts ==
=== Weekly charts ===
Chart performance for God Forgives, I Don't
Chart (2012)	Peak position
Australian Albums (ARIA)	41
Belgian Albums (Ultratop Flanders)	57
Belgian Albums (Ultratop Wallonia)	112
Canadian Albums (Billboard)	1
Dutch Albums (Album Top 100)	28
French Albums (SNEP)	29
Norwegian Albums (VG-lista)	30
South African Albums Chart	16
Swiss Albums (Schweizer Hitparade)	33
UK Albums (Official Charts)	8
US Billboard 200	1
US Top R&B/Hip-Hop Albums (Billboard)	1

=== Year-end charts ===
2012 year-end chart performance for God Forgives, I Don't
Chart (2012)	Position
US Billboard 200	49
US Top R&B/Hip-Hop Albums (Billboard)	8

2013 year-end chart performance for God Forgives, I Don't
Chart (2013)	Position
US Top R&B/Hip-Hop Albums (Billboard)	59

== Certifications ==
Certifications for God Forgives, I Don't
Region	Certification	Certified units/sales
United States (RIAA)	Gold	500,000^{^}
^{^} Shipments figures based on certification alone.

== Release history ==
Release dates and formats for God Forgives, I Don't
Region	Date	Label(s)	Format(s)	Edition	Ref.
United Kingdom	July 30, 2012	Mercury; Island Def Jam	CD; digital download	Standard; deluxe	
Canada	July 31, 2012	Universal	CD; digital download	Standard; deluxe	
Germany	July 31, 2012	Universal	CD; digital download	Standard; deluxe	
United States	July 31, 2012	Maybach; Def Jam	CD; digital download	Standard; deluxe	
Australia	January 1, 2012	Universal	CD; digital download	Standard; deluxe	
Japan	January 1, 2012	Universal	CD; digital download	Standard; deluxe	
South Africa	January 1, 2012	Island Def Jam	Digital download	Standard	
