= Tammy Brook =

American businesswoman

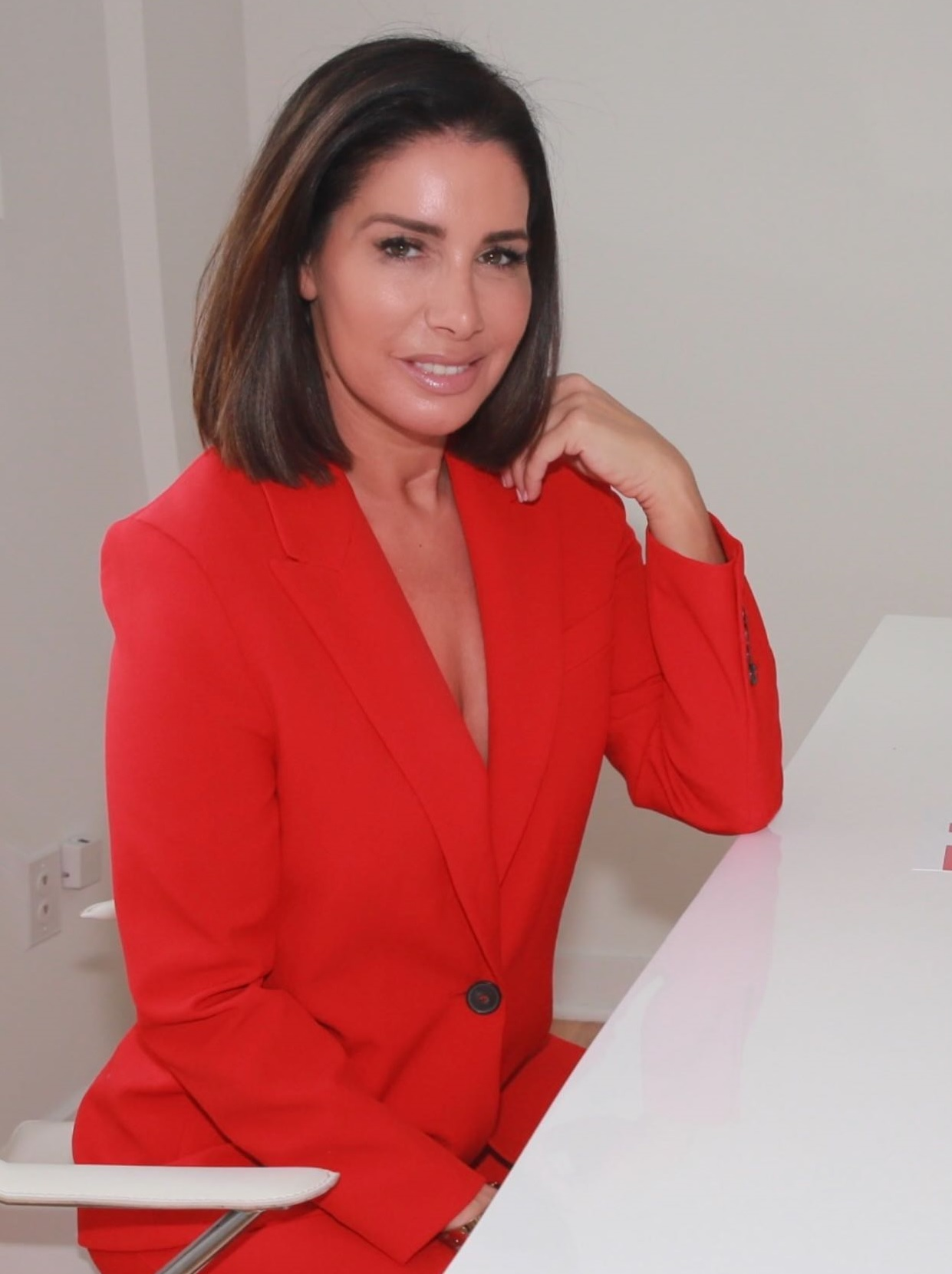
- Occupations: Businesswoman; CEO and Founder of FYI Brand Group

Tammy Brook is an American businesswoman and the founder/CEO of FYI Brand Group.

== Personal life ==
Tammy Brook grew up in Brentwood, California. Her father was Itzhak Brook, and her brother is filmmaker named Yoni Brook.

== Career ==
Brook started her career as a music executive at Empire Management. She founded FYI Brand Communications in 2001 as a public relations and brand marketing agency. In 2018, Brook relaunched the company as FYI Brand Group with a focus on brand partnerships and social impact. FYI Brand Group has offices in New York and Los Angeles, and has represented Apple Music, Adidas, MTV, Jhené Aiko, DJ Khaled, Travis Scott, French Montana, Doja Cat, Pusha T, Steve Aoki, Russell Westbrook, Damian Lillard, Cardi B, Kanye West, Mike WiLL Made-It and Odell Beckham Jr..

Brook was named to Variety's Power of Women Impact List in 2018.

In 2019, when 21 Savage was detained by ICE, Brook created the #Free21Savage human rights coalition, winning the Social Good Creator Award at The 9th Annual Streamy Awards for 21 Savage's literacy campaign.

Brook was a co-producer on Little Ballers alongside executive producer Crystal McCrary in 2023, and as producer of French Montana's documentary film The French Montana Story: For Khadija in 2023.

In 2026, Brook was recognized for her work by being named to Billboard's 2026 Sports & Music Power Players list.
