= 9 Piece =

Single by Rick Ross featuring Lil Wayne

from the album Ashes to Ashes
- Released: May 10, 2011
- Recorded: 2010–2011
- Genre: Hip hop
- Length: 5:17 (T.I. version); 3:59 (Lil Wayne version)
- Label: Maybach Music Group; Def Jam; Slip-n-Slide
- Songwriters: William Leonard Roberts II; Clifford Joseph Harris, Jr.; Dwayne Carter; Lexus Lewis
- Producer: Lex Luger

Rick Ross singles chronology
"Ima Boss" (2011)	"9 Piece" (2011)	"I'm on One" (2011)

Lil Wayne singles chronology
"Dirty Dancer" (2011)	"9 Piece" (2011)	"Ballin'" (2011)

T.I. singles chronology
"That's All She Wrote" (2011)	"9 Piece" (2011)	"Ready Set Go (Remix)" (2011)

"9 Piece" is a song by American rapper Rick Ross. There are two versions, one featuring T.I. and the other – Lil Wayne. The song was originally placed on Ross' mixtape Ashes to Ashes and later released as a single from his fifth studio album, God Forgives, I Don't (2011). However, despite peaking at number 61 on the Billboard Hot 100, the song did not make the final cut for the album. In 2013, "9 Piece" was featured on the soundtrack of Sofia Coppola's film The Bling Ring.

== Background ==
"9 Piece" was produced by Lex Luger, with whom Ross had previously worked on the single "B.M.F. (Blowin' Money Fast)", as well as "MC Hammer" off of his 2010 studio album Teflon Don. The original version of "9 Piece" with a guest verse by T.I. was featured on Ross' mixtape Ashes to Ashes, which was released on December 24, 2010. A new version was recorded later, with Lil Wayne replacing T.I. The second version was released as a single from God Forgives, I Don't on May 10, 2011. Despite being a commercial success, the song was left out of the final track list for the album.

== Commercial performance ==
On the week of May 21, 2011, "9 Piece" reached number 50 on the Billboard Hot R&B/Hip-Hop Songs chart. The following week, the song debuted and peaked at number 61 on the Hot 100. On the week of July 9, it peaked at number 18 on the Hot Rap Songs chart, staying there for 10 weeks. The following week, the song peaked at number 32 on the Hot R&B/Hip-Hop Songs chart, remaining there for 20 weeks. The track was certified gold by the RIAA on August 31, 2021.

== Music video ==
Each version of the song has its own music video. The first video was directed by MMG's in-house director Spiff TV, and was released on December 24, 2010, coinciding with the release of Ashes to Ashes. The official music video for the second version, directed by Gil Green, was released on June 24, 2011. It shows Rick Ross and Lil Wayne at various locations, including a restaurant, its parking lot, a strip club and a pool club. The rappers are organizing drug deals via their iPhones while under police surveillance. The video features cameo appearances from Gunplay, Ace Hood, Torch, Young Breed, 8Ball & MJG, DJ Khaled, French Montana and Birdman. Alex Young of Consequence of Sound commented on the video: "Strippers, guns, drugs, and...iPhones? Check, check, check, and check." As of May 2014, it has gained over 4 million views on YouTube.

== The Bling Ring ==
"9 Piece" was featured on the soundtrack of the 2013 crime film The Bling Ring, directed by Sofia Coppola. The soundtrack was supervised by frequent Coppola collaborator Brian Reitzell and contains a mix of music ranging between hip-hop, krautrock and electronic. Reitzell tried to find contemporary music that would fit within the film's setting, commenting "I spent a few months listening to everything that is out now, and then going back a bit to when the story actually happened." "9 Piece" is featured in one of the first scenes of the film, where the characters of Katie Chang and Claire Julien are seen rapping to the song, while it's playing from their car's stereo system.

== Charts ==
Chart (2011)	Peak position
US Billboard Hot 100	61
US Hot R&B/Hip-Hop Songs (Billboard)	32
US Hot Rap Songs (Billboard)	18

== Certifications ==
Region	Certification	Certified units/sales
United States (RIAA)	Gold	500,000^{‡}
^{‡} Sales+streaming figures based on certification alone.

== Release history ==
Country	Date	Format	Label
United States	May 10, 2011	Digital download	Maybach Music Group, Def Jam, Slip-n-Slide
