= February 26 =

February 26 this year in various calendars
- Thursday, 26 February 2026
Akan	Kwayaw
Armenian	11 Areg 1475
Aztec	Tecuilhuitontli 7, 9 Cuāuhtli
Babylonian	8 Shabatu, 2336 SE
Balinese pawukon	Menga, Beteng, Jaya, Wage, Was, Wraspati of Bala, Guru, Tulus, Suka
Bengali	13 Falgun, BS 1432
Chinese	Yin Metal Goat・Well Mansion; Fire Horse Year, Month 1, Day 10 (Yushui, 7 days until Jingzhe)
Common Era	26 February 2026 CE
Coptic	19 Meshir, AM 1742
Egyptian	16 Epiphi, 2774 NE
Ethiopian	19 Yakātit, 2018 Amätä Məhrät
French Republican	Décade I, Octidi de Ventôse de l'Année 234 de la République
Gregorian	26 February, AD 2026
Hebrew	9 Adar, AM 5786
Hindu	Mṛgaśiras・Viṣkambha; Solar: 14 Phālguna, 1947 SE; Lunisolar: Daśamī, Śukla pakṣa of Phālguna, 2082 VE; Rāudra・5126 KY・1,872,632
Icelandic	Fimmtudagur, 5 Góa 2025
Islamic	9 Ramadan, AH 1447 (using tabular method)
ISO week date	2026-W09-4
Japanese	10 Mutsuki, Reiwa 8 (Usui, 7 days until Keichitsu)
Julian	13 February, AD 2026 (AM 7534)
Julian day	2461098
Korean	10 Horangidal, 4359 DE
Maya	13.0.13.6.15; 13 Kayab, 9 Men
Roman	Idibus Februariis, MMDCCLXXIX AUC
Solar Hijri	7 Esfand, SH 1404
Tibetan	10 mchu, me pho rta 2153 or 1772 or 1000

<<	February					>>
Su	Mo	Tu	We	Th	Fr	Sa
1	2	3	4	5	6	7
8	9	10	11	12	13	14
15	16	17	18	19	20	21
22	23	24	25	26	27	28
2026

February 26 in recent years
2026 (Thursday)
2025 (Wednesday)
2024 (Monday)
2023 (Sunday)
2022 (Saturday)
2021 (Friday)
2020 (Wednesday)
2019 (Tuesday)
2018 (Monday)
2017 (Sunday)

February 26 is the 57th day of the year in the Gregorian calendar; 308 days remain until the end of the year (309 in leap years).

== Events ==
=== Pre-1600 ===
- 747 BC – According to Ptolemy, the epoch (origin) of the Nabonassar Era began at noon on this date. Historians use this to establish the modern BC chronology for dating historic events.
- 320 – Chandragupta I is officially crowned as the first Gupta Emperor.
- 364 – Valentinian I is proclaimed Roman Emperor.
- 1074 – Battle of Kemej: The royal army of Solomon, King of Hungary defeats the force of his rebellious cousin Duke Géza.
- 1266 – Battle of Benevento: An army led by Charles, Count of Anjou, defeats a combined German and Sicilian force led by Manfred, King of Sicily. Manfred is killed in the battle and Pope Clement IV invests Charles as king of Sicily and Naples.
- 1365 – The Ava Kingdom and the royal city of Ava (Inwa) were founded by King Thado Minbya.

=== 1601–1900 ===
- 1606 – The Janszoon voyage of 1605–06 becomes the first European expedition to set foot on Australia, although it is mistaken as a part of New Guinea.
- 1616 – Galileo Galilei is formally banned by the Roman Catholic Church from teaching or defending the view that the earth orbits the sun.
- 1775 – The British East India Company factory on Balambangan Island is destroyed by Moro pirates.
- 1794 – The first Christiansborg Palace in Copenhagen burns down.
- 1815 – Napoleon Bonaparte escapes from exile on the island of Elba.
- 1870 – The Beach Pneumatic Transit in New York City, intended as a demonstration for a subway line, opens.
- 1876 – Japan and Korea sign the Treaty of Kangwha, which grants Japanese citizens extraterritoriality rights in Korea, opens three Korean ports to Japanese trade, and ends Korea's status as a tributary state of Qing dynasty China.

=== 1901–present ===
- 1909 – Kinemacolor, the first successful color motion picture process, is first shown to the general public at the Palace Theatre in London.
- 1914 – HMHS Britannic, sister to the RMS Olympic and RMS Titanic, is launched at Harland and Wolff shipyard in Belfast.
- 1919 – President Woodrow Wilson signs an act of Congress establishing the Grand Canyon National Park.
- 1929 – President Calvin Coolidge signs legislation establishing the 96,000 acres (390 km^{2}) Grand Teton National Park in Wyoming.
- 1935 – Adolf Hitler orders the Luftwaffe to be re-formed, violating the provisions of the Treaty of Versailles.
- 1935 – Robert Watson-Watt carries out a demonstration near Daventry which leads directly to the development of radar in the United Kingdom.
- 1936 – In the February 26 Incident, young nationalist Japanese military officers assassinate multiple cabinet statesmen and start a rebellion in downtown Tokyo, which is ended 3 days later.
- 1945 – World War II: US troops reclaim the Philippine island of Corregidor from the Japanese.
- 1952 – Vincent Massey is sworn in as the first Canadian-born Governor General of Canada.
- 1960 – A New York-bound Alitalia airliner crashes into a cemetery in Shannon, Ireland, shortly after takeoff, killing 34 of the 52 persons on board.
- 1960 – A Kyiv-bound Aeroflot airliner crashes on approach to Snilow Airport in Lviv, killing 32 of the 33 people on board.
- 1966 – Apollo program: Launch of AS-201, the first flight of the Saturn IB rocket.
- 1971 – U.N. Secretary-General U Thant signs United Nations proclamation of the vernal equinox as Earth Day.
- 1979 – The Superliner railcar enters revenue service with Amtrak.
- 1980 – Egypt and Israel establish full diplomatic relations.
- 1987 – Iran–Contra affair: The Tower Commission rebukes President Ronald Reagan for not controlling his national security staff.
- 1992 – First Nagorno-Karabakh War: Khojaly Massacre: Armenian armed forces and the 366th CIS Regiment massacre Azeri civilians at a military post outside the town of Khojaly leaving hundreds dead.
- 1993 – World Trade Center bombing: In New York City, a truck bomb parked below the North Tower of the World Trade Center explodes, killing six and injuring over a thousand people.
- 1995 – The UK's oldest investment banking institute, Barings Bank, collapses after a rogue securities broker Nick Leeson loses $1.4 billion by speculating on the Singapore International Monetary Exchange using futures contracts.
- 2008 – The New York Philharmonic performs in Pyongyang, North Korea; this was the first such event to take place in North Korea.
- 2012 – A train derails in Burlington, Ontario, Canada killing at least three people and injuring 45.
- 2012 – Seventeen-year-old African-American student Trayvon Martin is shot to death by neighborhood watch coordinator George Zimmerman in an altercation in Sanford, Florida.
- 2013 – A hot air balloon crashes near Luxor, Egypt, killing 19 people.
- 2019 – Indian Air Force fighter-jets target Jaish-e-Mohammed terrorist training camps in Balakot, Pakistan.
- 2021 – A total of 279 female students aged between 10 and 17 are kidnapped by bandits in the Zamfara kidnapping in Zamfara State, Nigeria.
- 2026 – The government of Pakistan declares "open war" against the Taliban in Afghanistan, initiating the 2026 Afghanistan–Pakistan War.

== Births ==
=== Pre-1600 ===
- 1361 – Wenceslaus IV of Bohemia (died 1419)
- 1416 – Christopher of Bavaria (died 1448)
- 1564 – Christopher Marlowe, English playwright, poet and translator (died 1593)
- 1584 – Albert VI, Duke of Bavaria (died 1666)
- 1587 – Stefano Landi, Italian composer and educator (died 1639)

=== 1601–1900 ===
- 1629 – Archibald Campbell, 9th Earl of Argyll, Scottish peer (died 1685)
- 1651 – Quirinus Kuhlmann, German Baroque poet and mystic (died 1689)
- 1671 – Anthony Ashley-Cooper, 3rd Earl of Shaftesbury, English philosopher and politician (died 1713)
- 1672 – Antoine Augustin Calmet, French monk and theologian (died 1757)
- 1677 – Nicola Fago, Italian composer and teacher (died 1745)
- 1714 – Biagio Bellotti, Italian painter and architect (died 1789)
- 1718 – Johan Ernst Gunnerus, Norwegian bishop, botanist and zoologist (died 1773)
- 1720 – Gian Francesco Albani, Italian cardinal (died 1803)
- 1729 – Anders Chydenius, Finnish economist, philosopher and Lutheran priest (died 1803)
- 1746 – Maria Amalia, Duchess of Parma (died 1804)
- 1770 – Anton Reicha, Bohemian composer and flautist (died 1836)
- 1777 – Matija Nenadović, Serbian priest, historian, and politician, 1st Prime Minister of Serbia (died 1854)
- 1786 – François Arago, French mathematician and politician, 25th Prime Minister of France (died 1853)
- 1802 – Victor Hugo, French author, poet, and playwright (died 1885)
- 1808 – Honoré Daumier, French painter, illustrator, and sculptor (died 1879)
- 1808 – Nathan Kelley, American architect, designed the Ohio Statehouse (died 1871)
- 1829 – Levi Strauss, German-American fashion designer, founded Levi Strauss & Co. (died 1902)
- 1842 – Camille Flammarion, French astronomer and author (died 1925)
- 1846 – Buffalo Bill, American soldier and hunter (died 1917)
- 1852 – John Harvey Kellogg, American surgeon, co-created Corn flakes (died 1943)
- 1857 – Émile Coué, French psychologist and pharmacist (died 1926)
- 1861 – Ferdinand I of Bulgaria (died 1948)
- 1861 – Nadezhda Krupskaya, Russian soldier and politician (died 1939)
- 1866 – Herbert Henry Dow, Canadian-American businessman, founded the Dow Chemical Company (died 1930)
- 1866 – Gustave Mathieu, French anarchist illegalist, suspected of being one of Ravachol's main accomplices (died 1947)
- 1871 – Matti Turkia, Finnish politician (died 1946)
- 1877 – Henry Barwell, Australian politician, 28th Premier of South Australia (died 1959)
- 1877 – Rudolph Dirks, German-American illustrator (died 1968)
- 1879 – Frank Bridge, English viola player and composer (died 1941)
- 1880 – Kenneth Edgeworth, Irish astronomer (died 1972)
- 1881 – Janus Djurhuus, Faroese poet (died 1948)
- 1882 – Husband E. Kimmel, American admiral (died 1968)
- 1885 – Aleksandras Stulginskis, Lithuanian farmer and politician, 2nd President of Lithuania (died 1969)
- 1887 – Grover Cleveland Alexander, American baseball player and coach (died 1950)
- 1887 – William Frawley, American actor and vaudevillian (died 1966)
- 1887 – Stefan Grabiński, Polish author and educator (died 1936)
- 1893 – Wallace Fard Muhammad, American religious leader, founded the Nation of Islam (disappeared 1934)
- 1893 – Dorothy Whipple, English novelist (died 1966)
- 1896 – Andrei Zhdanov, Ukrainian-Russian civil servant and politician (died 1948)
- 1899 – Max Petitpierre, Swiss jurist and politician, 54th President of the Swiss Confederation (died 1994)
- 1900 – Halina Konopacka, Polish discus thrower and poet (died 1989)
- 1900 – Fritz Wiessner, German-American mountaineer (died 1988)

=== 1901–present ===
- 1902 – Jean Bruller, French author and illustrator, co-founded Les Éditions de Minuit (died 1991)
- 1903 – Giulio Natta, Italian chemist and academic, Nobel Prize laureate (died 1979)
- 1903 – Orde Wingate, English general (died 1944)
- 1906 – Madeleine Carroll, English actress (died 1987)
- 1908 – Tex Avery, American animator, producer, and voice actor (died 1980)
- 1908 – Nestor Mesta Chayres, Mexican operatic tenor and bolero vocalist (died 1971)
- 1908 – Jean-Pierre Wimille, French racing driver (died 1949)
- 1909 – Fanny Cradock, English chef, author, and critic (died 1994)
- 1909 – Talal of Jordan (died 1972)
- 1910 – Vic Woodley, English footballer (died 1978)
- 1911 – Tarō Okamoto, Japanese painter and sculptor (died 1996)
- 1914 – Robert Alda, American actor, singer, and director (died 1986)
- 1918 – Otis Bowen, American physician and politician, 44th Governor of Indiana (died 2013)
- 1918 – Pyotr Masherov, Leader of Soviet Belarus (died 1980)
- 1918 – Theodore Sturgeon, American author and critic (died 1985)
- 1919 – Mason Adams, American actor (died 2005)
- 1920 – Danny Gardella, American baseball player and trainer (died 2005)
- 1920 – Lucjan Wolanowski, Polish journalist and author (died 2006)
- 1921 - Betty Hutton, American actress, singer, dancer and comedian (died 2007)
- 1922 – Bill Johnston, Australian cricketer and businessman (died 2007)
- 1922 – Margaret Leighton, English actress (died 1976)
- 1924 – Marc Bucci, American composer, lyricist, and dramatist (died 2002)
- 1924 – Noboru Takeshita, Japanese soldier and politician, 74th Prime Minister of Japan (died 2000)
- 1925 – Everton Weekes, Barbadian cricketer and referee (died 2020)
- 1926 – Doris Belack, American actress (died 2011)
- 1926 – Verne Gagne, American football player, wrestler, and trainer (died 2015)
- 1926 – Henry Molaison, American medical patient (died 2008)
- 1927 – Tom Kennedy, American game show host and actor (died 2020)
- 1928 – Fats Domino, American singer-songwriter and pianist (died 2017)
- 1928 – Ariel Sharon, Israeli general and politician, 11th Prime Minister of Israel (died 2014)
- 1931 – Ally MacLeod, Scottish footballer and manager (died 2004)
- 1933 – James Goldsmith, French-British businessman and politician (died 1997)
- 1934 – Mohammed Lakhdar-Hamina, Algerian director, producer, and screenwriter (died 2025)
- 1936 – José Policarpo, Portuguese cardinal (died 2014)
- 1937 – Paul Dickson, American football player and coach (died 2011)
- 1939 – Chuck Wepner, American boxer
- 1940 – Oldřich Kulhánek, Czech painter, illustrator, and stage designer (died 2013)
- 1942 – Jozef Adamec, Slovak footballer and manager (died 2018)
- 1943 – Paul Cotton, American singer-songwriter and guitarist (died 2021)
- 1943 – Dante Ferretti, Italian art director and costume designer
- 1943 – Bob Hite, American singer-songwriter and musician (died 1981)
- 1944 – Christopher Hope, South African author and poet
- 1944 – Ronald Lauder, American businessman and diplomat, United States Ambassador to Austria
- 1945 – Peter Brock, Australian racing driver (died 2006)
- 1946 – Colin Bell, English footballer (died 2021)
- 1946 – Bingo Smith, American basketball player (died 2023)
- 1946 – Ahmed Zewail, Egyptian-American chemist and academic, Nobel Prize laureate (died 2016)
- 1947 – Sandie Shaw, English singer and psychotherapist
- 1948 – Sharyn McCrumb, American author
- 1949 – Simon Crean, Australian trade union leader and politician, 14th Australian Minister for the Arts (died 2023)
- 1949 – Elizabeth George, American author and educator
- 1949 – Emma Kirkby, English soprano
- 1950 – Helen Clark, New Zealand academic and politician, 37th Prime Minister of New Zealand
- 1950 – Billy Steinberg, American songwriter (died 2026)
- 1951 – Wayne Goss, Australian lawyer and politician, 34th Premier of Queensland (died 2014)
- 1953 – Barbara Niven, American actress and writer
- 1954 – Prince Ernst August of Hanover, head of the House of Hanover
- 1955 – Andreas Maislinger, Austrian historian and academic, founded the Austrian Holocaust Memorial Service
- 1956 – Michel Houellebecq, French author, poet, screenwriter, and director
- 1957 – David Beasley, American lawyer and politician, 113th Governor of South Carolina
- 1957 – Joe Mullen, American ice hockey player and coach
- 1957 – John Jude Palencar, American artist and illustrator
- 1957 – Keena Rothhammer, American swimmer
- 1958 – Liza 'N' Eliaz, Belgian, transgender, hardcore DJ (died 2001)
- 1958 – Susan Helms, American general, engineer, and astronaut
- 1958 – Tim Kaine, American lawyer and politician, 70th Governor of Virginia
- 1959 – Rolando Blackman, Panamanian-American basketball player
- 1959 – Ahmet Davutoğlu, Turkish political scientist, academic, and politician, 37th Prime Minister of Turkey
- 1960 – Jaz Coleman, English singer-songwriter, keyboard player, and producer
- 1962 – Ahn Cheol-soo, South Korean physician, academic, and politician
- 1965 – James Mitchell, American wrestler and manager
- 1966 – Garry Conille, Haitian physician and politician, 14th Prime Minister of Haiti
- 1966 – Marc Fortier, French-Canadian ice hockey player
- 1966 – Najwa Karam, Lebanese singer
- 1967 – Kazuyoshi Miura, Japanese footballer
- 1967 – Gene Principe, Canadian sports reporter and broadcaster
- 1968 – Leif Rohlin, Swedish ice hockey player
- 1969 – Hitoshi Sakimoto, Japanese composer and producer
- 1970 – Predrag Danilović, Serbian basketball player and executive
- 1970 – Mark Harper, English accountant and politician, former Secretary of State for Transport and former Minister of State for Immigration
- 1971 – Max Martin, Swedish-American record producer and songwriter
- 1971 – Hélène Segara, French singer-songwriter and actress
- 1973 – Marshall Faulk, American football player
- 1973 – Ole Gunnar Solskjær, Norwegian footballer and manager
- 1973 – Jenny Thompson, American swimmer
- 1974 – Mikee Cojuangco-Jaworski, Filipina television actress, host and equestrienne
- 1974 – Sébastien Loeb, French racing driver
- 1975 – P. J. Axelsson, Swedish ice hockey player
- 1976 – Nalini Anantharaman, French mathematician
- 1976 – Chad Urmston, American singer-songwriter and guitarist
- 1977 – Marty Reasoner, American ice hockey player and coach
- 1977 – Tim Thomas, American basketball player
- 1977 – Shane Williams, Welsh rugby union player
- 1978 – Abdoulaye Faye, Senegalese footballer
- 1979 – Steve Evans, Welsh footballer
- 1979 – Pedro Mendes, Portuguese footballer
- 1980 – Steve Blake, American basketball player
- 1981 – Kevin Dallman, Canadian-Kazakhstani ice hockey player
- 1981 – Kertus Davis, American race car driver
- 1981 – Simon Maljevac, Slovenian politician
- 1981 – Robert Mathis, American football player
- 1981 – Oh Seung-bum, South Korean footballer
- 1981 – Sharon Van Etten, American singer-songwriter, musician and actress
- 1982 – Li Na, Chinese tennis player
- 1982 – Matt Prior, South African-English cricketer
- 1983 – Jerome Harrison, American football player
- 1983 – Pepe, Brazilian-Portuguese footballer
- 1984 – Emmanuel Adebayor, Togolese footballer
- 1984 – Beren Saat, Turkish actress
- 1985 – Fernando Llorente, Spanish footballer
- 1986 – Mārtiņš Karsums, Latvian ice hockey player
- 1986 – Hannah Kearney, American skier
- 1989 – Gabriel Obertan, French footballer
- 1990 – Takanoiwa Yoshimori, Mongolian sumo wrestler
- 1991 – Lee Chae-rin, South Korean singer
- 1991 – Kevin Plawecki, American baseball player
- 1992 – Mikael Granlund, Finnish hockey player
- 1993 – Morgan Gautrat, American soccer player
- 1994 – Jacob Trouba, American ice hockey player
- 1994 – Mahra Al Maktoum, Emirati princess.
- 1997 – Jessie Bates, American football player
- 2000 – Yeat, American rapper
- 2002 – Gerard Martín, Spanish footballer
- 2002 – César Tárrega, Spanish footballer
- 2003 – Jamal Musiala, German footballer
- 2004 – Bibisara Assaubayeva, Kazakhstani chess grandmaster

== Deaths ==
=== Pre-1600 ===
- 420 – Porphyry of Gaza, Greek bishop and saint (born 347)
- 943 – Muirchertach mac Néill, King of Ailech (Ireland)
- 1154 – Roger II of Sicily (born 1095)
- 1266 – Manfred, King of Sicily (born 1232)
- 1275 – Margaret of England, Queen consort of Scots (born 1240)
- 1349 – Fatima bint al-Ahmar, Nasrid princess in the Emirate of Granada (born c.1260)
- 1360 – Roger Mortimer, 2nd Earl of March, English commander (born 1328)
- 1462 – John de Vere, 12th Earl of Oxford, English politician (born 1408)
- 1474 – Eom Heung-do, local official of Joseon (born 1404)
- 1548 – Lorenzino de' Medici, Italian writer and assassin (born 1514)
- 1577 – Eric XIV of Sweden (born 1533)

=== 1601–1900 ===
- 1603 – Maria of Austria, Holy Roman Empress, spouse of Maximilian II (born 1528)
- 1608 – John Still, English bishop (born 1543)
- 1611 – Antonio Possevino, Italian priest and diplomat (born 1533)
- 1625 – Anna Vasa of Sweden, Polish and Swedish princess (born 1568)
- 1630 – William Brade, English violinist and composer (born 1560)
- 1638 – Claude Gaspard Bachet de Méziriac, French mathematician and linguist (born 1581)
- 1723 – Thomas d'Urfey, English poet and playwright (born 1653)
- 1726 – Maximilian II Emanuel, Elector of Bavaria (born 1662)
- 1770 – Giuseppe Tartini, Italian violinist and composer (born 1692)
- 1790 – Joshua Rowley, English admiral (born 1730)
- 1802 – Esek Hopkins, American admiral (born 1718)
- 1806 – Thomas-Alexandre Dumas, Haitian-French general (born 1762)
- 1813 – Robert R. Livingston, American lawyer and politician, 1st United States Secretary of Foreign Affairs (born 1746)
- 1815 – Prince Josias of Saxe-Coburg-Saalfeld (born 1737)
- 1821 – Joseph de Maistre, French lawyer and diplomat (born 1753)
- 1839 – Sybil Ludington, American figure of the American Revolutionary War (born 1761)
- 1864 – Louis-Hippolyte Lafontaine, Canadian jurist and politician, 3rd Premier of Canada East (born 1807)
- 1869 – Afzal-ud-Daulah, Asaf Jah V, 5th Nizam of Hyderabad State (born 1827)
- 1883 – Alexandros Koumoundouros, Greek lawyer and politician, 56th Prime Minister of Greece (born 1817)
- 1887 – Anandi Gopal Joshi, First Indian women physician (born 1865)
- 1889 – Karl Davydov, Russian cellist and composer (born 1838)
- 1895 – Kathinka Kraft, Norwegian memoirist (born 1826)

=== 1901–present ===
- 1903 – Richard Jordan Gatling, American engineer, invented the Gatling gun (born 1818)
- 1906 – Jean Lanfray, Swiss convicted murderer (born 1874)
- 1913 – Felix Draeseke, German composer and academic (born 1835)
- 1921 – Carl Menger, Polish-Austrian economist and academic (born 1840)
- 1930 – Mary Whiton Calkins, American philosopher and psychologist (born 1863)
- 1931 – Otto Wallach, German chemist and academic, Nobel Prize laureate (born 1847)
- 1936 – February 26 Incident:
  - Takahashi Korekiyo, Japanese accountant and politician, 20th Prime Minister of Japan (born 1854)
  - Saitō Makoto, Japanese admiral and politician, 30th Prime Minister of Japan (born 1858)
  - Jōtarō Watanabe, Japanese general (born 1874)
- 1943 – Potato Creek Johnny, American gold prospector (born c. 1866)
- 1943 – Theodor Eicke, German general (born 1892)
- 1945 – Sándor Szurmay, Minister of Defence of the Hungarian portion of Austria-Hungary (born 1860)
- 1947 – Heinrich Häberlin, Swiss judge and politician, President of the Swiss National Council (born 1868)
- 1950 – Harry Lauder, Scottish comedian and singer (born 1870)
- 1951 – Sabiha Kasimati, Albanian ichthyologist (born 1912) executed with 21 others
- 1952 – Theodoros Pangalos, Greek general and politician, President of Greece (born 1878)
- 1961 – Karl Albiker, German sculptor, lithographer, and educator (born 1878)
- 1961 – Mohammed V of Morocco (born 1909)
- 1966 – Vinayak Damodar Savarkar, Indian poet and politician (born 1883)
- 1969 – Levi Eshkol, Israeli soldier and politician, 3rd Prime Minister of Israel (born 1895)
- 1969 – Karl Jaspers, German-Swiss psychiatrist and philosopher (born 1883)
- 1981 – Robert Aickman, English author and activist (born 1914)
- 1981 – Howard Hanson, American composer, conductor, and educator (born 1896)
- 1985 – Tjalling Koopmans, Dutch-American economist and mathematician, Nobel Prize laureate (born 1910)
- 1989 – Roy Eldridge, American trumpet player (born 1911)
- 1993 – Constance Ford, American model and actress (born 1923)
- 1994 – Bill Hicks, American comedian (born 1961)
- 1995 – Jack Clayton, English director and producer (born 1921)
- 1997 – David Doyle, American actor (born 1929)
- 1998 – Theodore Schultz, American economist and academic, Nobel Prize laureate (born 1902)
- 2000 – George L. Street III, American captain, Medal of Honor recipient (born 1913)
- 2000 – Raosaheb Gogte, Indian industrialist (born 1916)
- 2002 – Lawrence Tierney, American actor (born 1919)
- 2004 – Adolf Ehrnrooth, Finnish general (born 1905)
- 2004 – Boris Trajkovski, Macedonian politician, 2nd President of the Republic of Macedonia (born 1956)
- 2005 – Jef Raskin, American computer scientist, created Macintosh (born 1943)
- 2006 – Georgina Battiscombe, British biographer (born 1905)
- 2008 – Bodil Udsen, Danish actress (born 1925)
- 2009 – Johnny Kerr, American basketball player, coach, and sportscaster (born 1932)
- 2009 – Wendy Richard, English actress (born 1943)
- 2009 – Norm Van Lier, American basketball player, coach, and sportscaster (born 1947)
- 2010 – Jun Seba, also known as "Nujabes", Japanese record producer, DJ, composer and arranger (born 1974)
- 2011 – Arnošt Lustig, Czech author, playwright, and screenwriter (born 1926)
- 2012 – Richard Carpenter, English actor and screenwriter (born 1929)
- 2013 – Marie-Claire Alain, French organist and educator (born 1926)
- 2013 – Stéphane Hessel, German-French diplomat and author (born 1917)
- 2013 – Simon Li, Hong Kong judge and politician (born 1922)
- 2014 – Sorel Etrog, Romanian-Canadian sculptor, painter, and illustrator (born 1933)
- 2014 – Phyllis Krasilovsky, American author and academic (born 1927)
- 2015 – Sheppard Frere, English historian and archaeologist (born 1916)
- 2015 – Theodore Hesburgh, American priest, theologian, educator, and academic (born 1917)
- 2015 – Earl Lloyd, American basketball player and coach (born 1928)
- 2015 – Tom Schweich, American lawyer and politician, 36th State Auditor of Missouri (born 1960)
- 2016 – Andy Bathgate, Canadian ice hockey player, coach, and manager (born 1932)
- 2016 – Don Getty, Canadian football player and politician, 11th Premier of Alberta (born 1933)
- 2017 – Joseph Wapner, American judge and TV personality (born 1919)
- 2025 – Michelle Trachtenberg, American actress (born 1985)

== Holidays and observances ==
- Christian feast day:
  - Alexander of Alexandria
  - Emily Malbone Morgan (Episcopal Church (USA))
  - Isabelle of France
  - Li Tim-Oi (Anglican Church of Canada)
  - Paula Montal Fornés
  - Porphyry of Gaza
  - February 26 (Eastern Orthodox liturgics)
- Day of Remembrance for Victims of Khojaly Massacre (Azerbaijan)
- Liberation Day (Kuwait)
- Saviours' Day (Nation of Islam)
