= Shot Caller =

Shot Caller or Shotcaller may refer to:

- Shot Caller (film), a 2017 film
- "Shot Caller" (Ian Carey song), a 2009 song by Ian Carey
- "Shot Caller" (song), a 2012 song by French Montana
- "Shotcaller", a 2011 song by Taio Cruz from TY.O
