= Itzhak Brook =

American academic

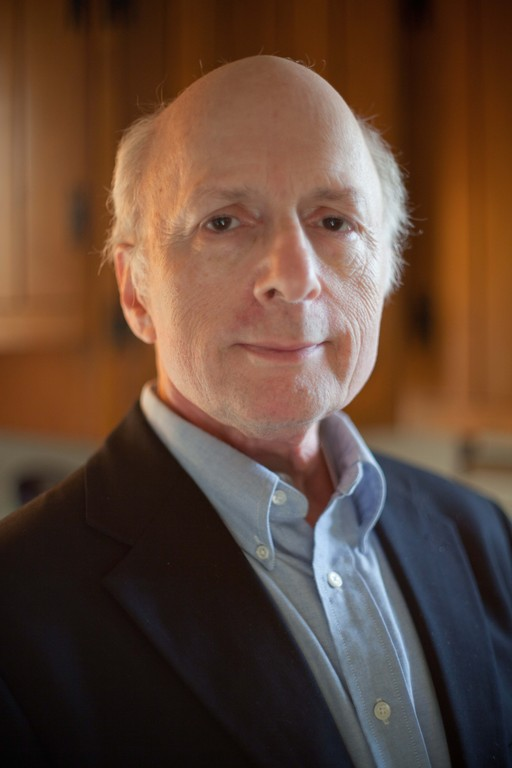
Itzhak Brook MD

Itzhak Brook (1941 - January 10, 2025) was an Israeli-American physician and medical researcher.

== Early life and career ==
Itzhak Brook was born in Afula in present-day Israel during the British Mandate era and raised in Haifa. His parents, Bernard (Baruch) and Chaya Brook, were immigrants from Austria and Poland respectively. His mother was a seamstress and his father was a welder and professional soccer player for Hapoel Haifa F.C. He had a younger sister, Zipi, who he cared for after his parents' deaths.

Brook graduated from the Hareali Haivri high school and was drafted into the Israel Defense Forces in 1959, where he completed an officer's course. He studied medicine at the Hebrew University of Jerusalem's Hadassah School of Medicine, earning an MD in 1968 and subsequently completing his residency there, and obtained an MSc in pediatrics from Tel Aviv University in 1972. He served as a medic in the Israeli army during the Six-Day War in 1967 and subsequently as a battalion physician during the Yom Kippur War in 1973, during which he held the rank of Lieutenant. After crossing the Suez Canal in his ambulance he was severely wounded by artillery fire.

In 1974, Brook moved to the United States with his family. He completed a fellowship in infectious diseases at the University of California, Los Angeles and joined the National Children's Medical Center in Washington, D.C. After several years there, he enlisted in the United States Navy and served in the Medical Corps for 27 years, holding the rank of Commander and leading research on treatments for infectious diseases resulting from nuclear and biological warfare at the Armed Forces Radiobiology Research Institute. During his service, he returned to Israel on behalf of the US Navy to share his medical research with the IDF's Medical Corps.

Brook was also an adjunct professor of pediatrics and medicine at Georgetown University School of Medicine in Washington, D.C., specializing in infectious diseases. He served as chairman of the Anti-infective Drug Advisory Committee of the Food and Drug Administration (FDA) and chaired the Committee when AZT was approved for the treatment of HIV/AIDS in 1987.

== Medical research & work ==
Brook has developed treatment guidelines for primary care clinicians, and has also done work on infectious disease of broad public interest. His main research interests are anaerobic infections, sinusitis, and tonsillitis. He is a long-standing campaigner against overuse of antibiotics which can lead to antibiotic resistance, has researched common health threats like disease transmission on airplanes, while dispelling common concerns about contaminated library books and subway handlebars. He has also been an expert source for major media on health issues like AZT, improving patient care after his own serious illness and cancer, and preventing medical errors.

Brook authored publications in scientific journals and 10 medical textbooks. He is the author of "The Laryngectomee Guide" that was published in 22 languages.

He was the US editor of Journal of Pediatric Infectious Diseases, Editor Textbook of "Pediatrics Infectious Diseases " at Medscape Reference, Section Editor of "Pediatric Infections" at Current Infectious Diseases Report, associate editor of Journal of Medical Case Reports, a member of the editorial board of several medical journals, and a board member of the Head and Neck Cancer Alliance.

During his service in the United States Navy he researched the treatment of bacterial infections after ionized radiation for which he was awarded three Defense Meritorious Service Medals. Brook received the 2012 J. Conley Medical Ethics Award of the American Academy of Otolaryngology–Head and Neck Surgery.

Brook was an expert witness on behalf of Vietnamese children injured in the 1975 Tan Son Nhut Lockheed C-5 crash during Operation Babylift in 1975. He examined 135 children in the US and Europe and testified on their behalf in nine trials. In doing so he testified against the US Navy, which was his employer. The US Navy attempted to block his testimony, causing a judge to reprimand the US government for witness tampering. Brook's testimony resulted in Lockheed Martin and the US government being found to have been negligent and ordered to pay for the children's rehabilitation.

Brook was a fellow of the Infectious Diseases Society of America, the Society for Pediatric Research, and the Pediatric Infectious Diseases Society. His research interests included anaerobic infections, the pathogenesis and therapy of polymicrobial infections, including upper respiratory tract infections (i.e. sinusitis, tonsillitis).

== Personal life ==
At age 65, Brook was diagnosed with throat cancer and underwent a laryngectomy. He wrote a book about that experience and a book about his experiences as a battalion physician in the 1973 Yom Kippur War. He also continued to lecture around the world using a prosthetic voice.

Brook married Zahava Goldwasser in 1966. They had two children in Israel, Dafna and Danny, and a third child, Tammy, in the United States. (Tammy is the founder and CEO of FYI Brand Group.) The marriage later ended in divorce. He subsequently married Joyce Reback in 1981 and they had two children, Yoni and Sara. Brook died of cancer on January 10, 2025 at the age of 83. He was survived by his wife Joyce, five children, five grandchildren, and sister.
