= So Sophisticated =

Single by Rick Ross featuring Meek Mill

from the album God Forgives, I Don't
- Released: June 5, 2012
- Recorded: 2012
- Genre: Trap
- Length: 4:10
- Label: Maybach Music Group; Def Jam
- Songwriters: William Roberts II; Anthony Tucker; Maurice Jordan; Jermaine Preyan; Robert Williams
- Producer: The Beat Bully

Rick Ross singles chronology
"Touch'N You" (2012)	"So Sophisticated" (2012)	"Beautiful Onyinye" (2012)

Meek Mill singles chronology
"I'm a Boss" (2011)	"So Sophisticated" (2012)	"Amen" (2012)

"So Sophisticated" is a song by American rapper Rick Ross. It was released on June 5, 2012 as the second single from his fifth studio album God Forgives, I Don't (2012). The song, produced by The Beat Bully, features a guest appearance from fellow Maybach Music Group rapper Meek Mill. On September 23, 2014, the single was certified Gold by the RIAA.

== Background ==
The song was premiered by Funkmaster Flex on May 21, 2012.

== Music video ==
The music video was directed by Dre Films and premiered on MTV Jams on June 24, 2012.

== Live performances ==
On July 26, 2012, Rick Ross performed the song on Jimmy Kimmel Live!.

== Track listing ==
Digital single

No.	Title	Writer(s)	Producer(s)	Length
1.	"So Sophisticated" (featuring Meek Mill)	William Roberts II; Anthony Tucker; M. Jordan; J. Preyan; Robert Williams	The Beat Bully	4:10

== Charts ==
Chart (2012)	Peak position
US Bubbling Under Hot 100 (Billboard)	4
US Hot R&B/Hip-Hop Songs (Billboard)	82

== Release history ==
Country	Date	Format	Label
United States	June 5, 2012	Digital download	Maybach Music Group, Def Jam
