= The French Montana Story: For Khadija =

- Directed by: Mandon Lovett
- Produced by: Drake and Ryan Kroft
- Starring: French Montana, Drake, Fat Joe
- Cinematography: Stack Moses, Bryan Robinson
- Edited by: Lauren Harris
- Music by: Jolin Ras
- Distributed by: Paramount +
- Release date: 19 November 2024
- Running time: 87 minutes

The French Montana Story: For Khadija is a 2024 documentary film directed by Mandon Lovett, and produced by Drake, Ryan Kroft, Max Benowitz, Tammy Brook, French Montana, Dina Sahim, and Vaughn Trudeau.

The film tells the story of Moroccan-born rapper French Montana, whose real name is Karim Kharbouch. After moving to the US at age of 13, French Montana faced significant challenges as his single mother worked tirelessly to raise him and his two brothers in the Bronx. The film captures the struggles of their immigrant journey that took him through the streets of New York to the Billboard charts, highlighting his mother's sacrifices and his perseverance in achieving the American Dream.
