= Ashes to Ashes (mixtape) =

Mixtape by Rick Ross
- Released: December 24, 2010
- Recorded: 2010
- Genre: Hip hop
- Label: Maybach Music Group
- Producer: Cashous Clay, Lex Luger, Beat Billionaire, Boi-1da, Young Fyre, Inkredibles, Nasty Beat Makers, Clinton Sparks, Aone Beats, Lil Lody

Rick Ross chronology
The Albert Anastasia EP (2010)	Ashes to Ashes (2010)	Rich Forever (2012)

Singles from Ashes To Ashes
- 1. "9 Piece" Released: May 25, 2011

Ashes to Ashes is the first mixtape by American rapper Rick Ross, it was released on December 24, 2010. The mixtape features guest appearances from Drake, T.I., Ludacris, Wiz Khalifa, Wale, Meek Mill, Chester French, Aaliyah, Ne-Yo and Birdman.

== Critical response ==
Professional ratings
Review scores
Source	Rating
Pitchfork Media	7.1/10
PopMatters	5/10
Rolling Stone	3/5 stars

Ashes to Ashes was met with generally favorable reviews from music critics. Jonah Weiner of Rolling Stone gave the mixtape three out of five stars, saying "On this mixtape — too uneven to match the gruff grandeur of 2010's Teflon Don, but featuring some thunderous production by Lex Luger and Boi-1da — Ross brags with such actorly gusto you don't really notice (or care) how little sense he makes: "I'm smokin' dope! I'm on my cellphone!" he roars on "9 Piece". That shouldn't sound impressive, but with Ross pitching it, it does." Tom Breihan of Pitchfork Media gave the mixtape a 7.1 out of ten, saying "The tape moves from bangers to slick, more meditative tracks before returning to bangers, and it might work better if it were all bangers, all the time. Ross knows he's onto something with "B.M.F.", and he sounds more urgent and alive over churning minor-key trunk-slams than over just about everything else. But other than one godawful chorus from the Chester French chump, the whole thing comes off slick and professional—more than enough to tide the world over in the brief period between Ross albums." David Amidon of PopMatters gave the mixtape a five out of ten, saying "Obviously, it’s a bit silly to complain about free music, and while Ross feels like a bit player in his own game once again, it mostly works to this tape’s advantage because of his weaknesses on the mic. So Ashes to Ashes succeeds in its main goals of keeping Ross in the public eye and verifying his ear for production. But it’s not going to win any new fans the way Albert Anastasia or Teflon Don did, and unless the production is way your thing, it’s going to be hard to find reasons to come back for multiple spins of the longplay."

== Track listing ==
No.	Title	Producer(s)	Length
1.	"Intro"	Cashous Clay	2:47
2.	"9 Piece" (featuring T.I.)	Lex Luger	5:17
3.	"John Doe"	Beat Billionaire	3:54
4.	"Black Man's Dream" (featuring Ludacris)	Boi-1da	3:30
5.	"RetroSuperFuture" (featuring Wiz Khalifa)	Young Fyre	2:59
6.	"Play Your Part" (featuring Wale, Meek Mill & Chester French)	Lee Major	4:42
7.	"Ashes To Ashes"	Nasty Beat Makers	3:17
8.	"Even Deeper" (featuring Barry White)	Cashous Clay	3:18
9.	"She Crazy" (featuring Aaliyah & Ne-Yo)	Clinton Sparks	2:52
10.	"10 Bricks" (featuring Birdman)	Aone Beats	3:16
11.	"Another One" (featuring Diddy)	Lil Lody	3:59
Total length:			40:07
