= Diced Pineapples =

Single by Rick Ross featuring Wale and Drake

from the album God Forgives, I Don't
- Released: August 21, 2012
- Recorded: 2012
- Genre: Hip hop
- Length: 4:39
- Label: Maybach Music Group; Def Jam; Warner Bros.
- Songwriters: William Roberts; Olubowale Akintimehin; Aubrey Graham; Carl McCormick
- Producer: Cardiak

Rick Ross singles chronology
"Triumphant (Get 'Em)" (2012)	"Diced Pineapples" (2012)	"Lord Knows" (2013)

Wale singles chronology
"In & Out" (2012)	"Diced Pineapples" (2012)	"Bad Ass" (2013)

Drake singles chronology
"Enough Said" (2012)	"Diced Pineapples" (2012)	"We in This Bitch 1.5" (2012)

Music video
- "Diced Pineapples" (Explicit) on YouTube

"Diced Pineapples" is a hip hop song by American rapper Rick Ross and featuring fellow American rapper Wale and Canadian rapper Drake. It was released as the fourth single from the former's fifth studio album God Forgives, I Don't on August 21, 2012.

== Music video ==
A music video for "Diced Pineapples" was filmed in Anguilla, and premiered on MTV2's Sucker Free on October 9, 2012. Wale and Drake both make an appearance as well as several models including Bernice Burgos. It was directed by Director X.

== Charts ==
Chart (2012–13)	Peak position
US Billboard Hot 100	71
US Hot R&B/Hip-Hop Songs (Billboard)	16
US Hot Rap Songs (Billboard)	14

== Certifications ==
Region	Certification	Certified units/sales
United States (RIAA)	Platinum	1,000,000^{‡}
^{‡} Sales+streaming figures based on certification alone.
