= Rich Forever =

Mixtape by Rick Ross
- Released: January 6, 2012
- Recorded: 2011
- Genre: Hip-hop
- Length: 79:00
- Labels: Maybach Music Group; Def Jam; Warner Bros. Records
- Producers: Lil' Lody; Saint Denson; Arthur McArthur; Boi-1da; Beat Billionaire; Academy Productionz; DVLP; Filthy; J.U.S.T.I.C.E. League; D. Rich; The Inkredibles; Lex Luger; Mike WiLL Made It; DJ Spinz; Cubic Z; Vinylz; Chuck Inglish; The Beat Bully

Rick Ross chronology
Ashes to Ashes (2010)	Rich Forever (2012)	The Black Bar Mitzvah (2012)

Singles from Rich Forever
- 1. "Stay Schemin'" Released: April 17, 2012

Rich Forever is the second mixtape by American rapper Rick Ross. It was released on January 6, 2012. It became one of the most downloaded hip hop mixtapes of all time. The mixtape spawned one commercial single, "Stay Schemin'" and features guest appearances from Diddy, 2 Chainz, Wale, John Legend, Nas, Kelly Rowland, Styles P, Birdman, Meek Mill, French Montana, Pharrell, Future, Stalley and Drake.

== Background ==
On January 6, 2012, the music video for Stay Schemin' featuring Drake, and French Montana was released. On February 8, 2012, the music video was released for "Yella Diamonds". On February 14, 2012, the music video was released for "MMG Untouchable". On February 21, 2012, the music video was released for "High Definition". On March 20, 2012, the music video was released for "I Swear To God". On March 30, 2012, the music video was released for "Party Heart" featuring 2 Chainz and Stalley. On April 15, 2012, the music video was released for "Ring Ring" featuring Future.

== Critical response ==
Professional ratings
Aggregate scores
Source	Rating
Metacritic	75/100
Review scores
Source	Rating
AllHipHop	8/10
The A.V. Club	B+
Consequence of Sound	3/5 stars
Fact	3.5/5
Pitchfork	8.2/10
PopMatters	5/10
RapReviews	5/10
Rolling Stone	3.5/5 stars
Spin	7/10
XXL	4/5

Rich Forever was met with generally favorable reviews from music critics. At Metacritic, which assigns a weighted mean rating out of 100 to reviews from mainstream critics, the mixtape received an average score of 70, based on 12 reviews, which indicates "generally favorable reviews". Jody Rosen of Rolling Stone gave the mixtape three and a half stars out of five, saying "Rich Forever is a mixtape that plays like an album, with blaring, heraldic production by the likes of Boi-1da and up-and-comer Beat Billionaire, plus guest appearances by Drake, Nas and Diddy." Evan Rytlewski of The A.V. Club gave the mixtape a B+, saying "Rich Forever meets a standard of quality control that’s rare for albums, let alone mixtapes: 18 new songs, all of them good, many of them exhilarating—chief among them the exultant “Keys To The Crib,” and “Triple Beam Dreams,” a courtroom drama featuring an elaborate Nas verse that's downright Illmatic-worthy. It's a big project, but it never drags, overreaches, or stumbles; Ross rhymes throughout with so much power and economy that it just keeps barreling forward. If he can sustain this remarkable stride, Ross could probably pull off a double album if he wanted to."

Mike Madden of Consequence of Sound gave the mixtape three out of five stars, saying "Rich Forever doesn't boast any potential mega-hits. But that's actually a good reason to give this a spin; the songs here are strong without shooting for the stars, hopefully because Ross is saving that kind of stuff for God Forgives. Consider this a rousing sneak-peek to what could be rap's biggest event-album of 2012." Jordan Sargent of Pitchfork gave the mixtape an 8.2 out of 10, saying "Rich Forever adds vindictive muscle to a motto that at one point might have come off as a hollow attempt at branding. It's a record that uses nastiness to cement the character "Rick Ross" as three-dimensional, and uses a barrage of bangers to cement the rapper Rick Ross as an undeniable force." David Amidon of PopMatters gave the mixtape a five out of ten, saying "Rich Forever is Ross at his most emotionally basic, and therefore, anyone choosing to take its journey should be willing to admit it's mainly for the aesthetic quality of his bearded husk grunting over some of the crispiest production you're likely to hear in 2012, even if the sum of those parts is somewhat unremarkable most of the time."

Carl Chery of XXL gave the mixtape an XL, saying "With Rich Forever, Ross continues to cement his position as one of hip-hop’s best artists. The tape surely sets the table for God Forgives, I Don’t to be the career-album rap fans and critics are expecting from Rozay. And if Ross is simply giving away music of this caliber, Lord knows he’ll be taking it up a few notches with his next commercial release." Jonathan Witz of AllHipHop gave the mixtape an eight out of ten, saying "Overall, Rich Forever is good enough to be an album, which ends up raising the bar as well as fan expectations for Ross’s delayed and much-anticipated upcoming LP. The entire process of releasing the Rich Forever tape generated a huge amount of buzz for the album as Ross had likely planned. Now, all he has to do is fulfill even higher expectations on God Forgives, I Don’t and continue to lead the way for his Maybach Music Group in 2012." Pedro Hernandez of RapReviews gave the mixtape a five out of ten, saying "Though I doubt these songs will have much in the form of lasting impact on anyone, for a weekend of partying or long car drive to work there certainly is enough to warrant a download. According to my own metrics, I see myself holding on to a good 8-9 tracks off of this for those moments I want to detach from reality in every way and pretend to be the lead in Scarface."

=== Accolades ===
The mixtape was named the third best album of 2012 by Complex, the 45th best by Rolling Stone and 47th best by Stereogum. In October 2013, Complex named it the seventh best hip hop album of the last five years.

== Track listing ==
No.	Title	Producer(s)	Length
1.	"Holy Ghost" (featuring Diddy)	Lil' Lody	3:26
2.	"High Definition"	Saint Denson	3:56
3.	"MMG Untouchable"	Arthur McArthur, Boi-1da	2:36
4.	"Yella Diamonds" (additional vocals by Birdman)	Beat Billionaire	4:25
5.	"Fuck Em" (featuring 2 Chainz & Wale)	Academy Productionz	4:30
6.	"London" (skit)		0:52
7.	"Rich Forever" (featuring John Legend)	DVLP, Filthy	5:05
8.	"Triple Beam Dreams" (featuring Nas)	J.U.S.T.I.C.E. League	4:22
9.	"Mine Games" (featuring Kelly Rowland)	Arthur McArthur	3:37
10.	"New Bugatti" (featuring Diddy)	D. Rich	3:02
11.	"Keys to the Crib" (featuring Styles P)	Lee Major	4:36
12.	"Last Breath" (featuring Birdman & Meek Mill)	D. Rich	5:24
13.	"I Swear to God"	Beat Billionaire	4:00
14.	"Off the Boat" (featuring French Montana)	Lex Luger	3:26
15.	"King of Diamonds"	Mike WiLL Made It	3:58
16.	"Ring Ring" (featuring Future)	Cubic Z, DJ Spinz	3:07
17.	"MMG the World is Ours" (featuring Pharrell, Meek Mill & Stalley)	Boi-1da, Vinylz	6:08
18.	"Party Heart" (featuring Stalley & 2 Chainz)	Chuck Inglish	4:27
19.	"Stay Schemin'" (featuring Drake & French Montana)	The Beat Bully	4:28
20.	"Shaheem Reid Speaks"		3:41
