= Mahra bint Mohammed Al Maktoum =

Emirati princess (born 1994)

- Sheikha
- Born: 26 February 1994 (age 32); Dubai, United Arab Emirates
- Spouse: Mana bin Mohammed bin Rashid bin Mana Al Maktoum (m. 2023; div. 2024)
- Issue: Mahra bint Mana Al Maktoum
Names
- Sheikha Mahra bint Mohammed bin Rashid bin Saeed bin Maktoum bin Hasher bin Maktoum bin Butti bin Suhail Al Maktoum
- House: Al Maktoum
- Father: Mohammed bin Rashid Al Maktoum
- Mother: Zoe Grigorakos
- Partner(s): French Montana (2025–present; engaged)

Sheikha Mahra bint Mohammed bin Rashid Al Maktoum (Arabic: مهرة بنت محمد بن راشد ال مكتوم; born 26 February 1994) is an Emirati princess and member of the Dubai ruling family as the daughter of the Prime Minister of the United Arab Emirates, Mohammed bin Rashid Al Maktoum. She gained international attention in 2024 after announcing her divorce of her husband on Instagram using the triple talaq, traditionally only done by men. She has been engaged to rapper French Montana since 2025. In 2024, she launched a perfume brand, with its first product named after her divorce.

== Early and personal life ==
Sheikha Mahra bint Mohammed bin Rashid Al Maktoum was born on 26 February 1994, as the only child from Mohammed bin Rashid Al Maktoum's marriage to Greek socialite Zoe Grigorakos. Her birth name was Christina. She has Greek ancestry from her mother, and is part of the Al Falasi house. She has 25 half-siblings through her father. She graduated from university in 2023 with a degree in international relations. She is interested in equestrianism.

Sheikha Mahra legally married Sheikh Mana bin Mohammed bin Rashid bin Mana Al Maktoum, an Emirati businessman, in April 2023, and had a wedding ceremony in May. The couple had a daughter, born in May 2024. Sheikha Mahra announced her divorce via Instagram in July 2024 after accusing him of infidelity, by invoking the practice of triple talaq, where a man divorces his wife by saying "I divorce you" three times. It is not customarily performed by women against their husbands. She would later thank her father for his support during the divorce.

Her divorce post caught the attention of Moroccan-American rapper French Montana, who was impressed, and asked a mutual connection to reach out to her. She gave Montana a tour of Dubai in October 2024, sparking dating rumours. In August 2025, a press release confirmed her engagement to Montana. Montana proposed following Paris Fashion Week in June 2025, where he modelled the Spring/Summer collection for 3.PARADIS. The engagement ring was designed by Eric Mavani and valued at an estimated $1.1 million.

== Career ==
In September 2024, Sheikha Mahra announced the launch of a perfume brand, Mahra M1. The first launch of the brand was called Divorce, inspired by her own divorce.

=== Charity work ===
Sheikha Mahra was the key royal family ambassador during her visit to the Community Development Authority of the Government of Dubai in 2021. In October and November 2023, she visited the Rashid Centre for People of Determination and donated toys.
