= Stay Schemin' =

Single by Rick Ross featuring Drake and French Montana

from the album Rich Forever
- Released: April 17, 2012
- Recorded: 2011
- Genre: Trap
- Length: 4:28
- Label: Maybach Music Group; Def Jam
- Songwriters: Aubrey Graham; Nasir Jones; Karim Kharbouch; William Leonard Roberts II; Anthony Tucker
- Producer: The Beat Bully

Rick Ross singles chronology
"Why" (2012)	"Stay Schemin'" (2012)	"Lemme See" (2012)

Drake singles chronology
"Take Care" (2012)	"Stay Schemin'" (2012)	"HYFR (Hell Ya Fucking Right)" (2012)

French Montana singles chronology
"Shot Caller" (2012)	"Stay Schemin'" (2012)	"Pop That" (2012)

"Stay Schemin'" is a song by American rapper Rick Ross featuring Drake and French Montana, released as a single from his 2012 mixtape Rich Forever. The track was released as a digital download from iTunes on April 17, 2012. It is a hip hop song that interpolates its chorus, sung by French Montana, from an unreleased Nas song titled "Day Dreamin, Stay Schemin", which covers the Kurtis Blow song, "Daydreamin'", with new lyrics.

== Background ==
The song is said to be the response to rapper Common after he allegedly dissed Drake on a track titled "Sweet", which was the third single from his album The Dreamer/The Believer. Drake has stated that "Stay Schemin'" is directed at Common. Common responded to "Stay Schemin'" with a remix that featured the original verses from Rick Ross and Drake as well as a new verse from him. Common called out Drake by name on the track, calling him Canada Dry, among other things. Common ended the song with "Say My Name", a song originally sung by Destiny's Child that Drake has sung live previously as a way to coax Drake into using Common's name in his diss tracks. The album artwork released by Common refers to Drake as "That Hoe Ass Nigga".

== Music video ==
The video for the song was released on January 6, 2012. The video features Rick Ross cruising through Miami in a Phantom, and Maybach alongside Drake and French Montana. Meek Mill and DJ Khaled also make appearances. The video was directed by Spiff TV for Maybach Films.

== Critical reception ==
"Stay Schemin'" was met with positive reviews. Complex praised the song, stating, "We've already listed 'Stay Schemin'' as the best song of the year, so you already know how we feel about it—but a lot of the song's impact had to do with Drake's incredible verse. In fact it just might be the best he's ever spit." Complex went on to name it on their list of the best songs of 2012, and the guest appearance of Drake the best feature of 2012. XXL named it one of the top five hip hop songs of 2012.

== "Fanute" ==
French Montana's lyric "from the hoopty coupe to that Ghost, dog" sounds more akin to "fanute the coupe to that Ghost, dog", leading to initial speculation about the possible meaning behind the mondegreen word "fanute". The word has become an internet meme, used ironically by various rappers and rap fans.

== Remixes ==
Many rappers have recorded remixes or freestyles over the instrumental of the song, including Common, Joell Ortiz, Joe Budden, Meek Mill, Gunplay, Chamillionaire, LoLa Monroe, Lil Twist, Tyga and ASAP Rocky.

== Charts ==
The song debuted in the top 60 of the Billboard Hot 100 at position 58. In its second week the song dropped to position 80 and fell off the chart the following week.

Chart performance for "Stay Schemin'"
Chart (2012)	Peak position
US Billboard Hot 100	58
US Hot R&B/Hip-Hop Songs	40
US Rap Songs	20

== Certifications ==
Certifications for "Stay Schemin'"
Region	Certification	Certified units/sales
New Zealand (RMNZ)	Gold	15,000^{‡}
United Kingdom (BPI)	Gold	400,000^{‡}
United States (RIAA)	Platinum	1,000,000^{‡}
^{‡} Sales+streaming figures based on certification alone.
