= Shot Caller (song) =

Single by French Montana
- Released: March 13, 2011
- Recorded: 2011
- Genre: Hip hop
- Length: 2:59
- Label: Bad Boy, Interscope
- Songwriters: Karim Kharbouch, Charlie Jimenez
- Producer: Harry Fraud

French Montana singles chronology
"Shot Caller" (2011)	"Stay Schemin'" (2012)

Charlie Rock singles chronology
"Shot Caller" (2012)

"Shot Caller" is a song by Moroccan-American rapper French Montana, released on March 13, 2011 ,as his commercial debut single. The hip hop song features singer Charlie Rock on the chorus, and was produced by record producer Harry Fraud. The song was first released as part of Montana's mixtape Mister 16: Casino Life on February 15, 2011. The song samples "Funky Child" by Lords of the Underground.

== Background ==
After French Montana announced signing with P. Diddy's Bad Boy Records in December 2011, a promotional video for the song "Shot Caller" was posted on WorldStarHipHop on December 11, 2012. A commercially available single for the song was made available on January 12, 2012, with Charlie Rock credited for the chorus feature this time around.

== Remix ==
On November 23, 2011, a remix for the song was made available featuring P. Diddy, Rick Ross and Charlie Rock. After announcing in January 2012 that Montana had signed a joint co-signing deal between Diddy's Bad Boy Records and Ross' Maybach Music Group, a promotional video and single was made available for "Shot Caller (Remix)" on February 21, 2012.

== Music videos ==
Filming for the "Shot Caller" music video took place on August 18, 2011. The video showcased model Yaris Sanchez, alongside guest appearances by P. Diddy, Fat Joe, Waka Flocka Flame, Busta Rhymes, Trae Tha Truth, Chinx Drugz, and producer Harry Fraud. The promotional video was posted on WorldStarHipHop on December 8, 2011.

Filming for the "Shot Caller (Remix)" video took place on January 29, 2012, and showcased guest appearances by Wale, DJ Khaled, Meek Mill, Ace Hood, Cassie and child rapper Lil Poopie. The promotional video and single was made available on February 21, 2012.

== Legacy ==
"Shot Caller", as a breakthrough single, led to French Montana signing with Bad Boy Records and Maybach Music Group, after a "bidding war" between different record labels.

Commercially, the song was a moderate success on the charts. However, it gained significant popularity in New York through radio and club play and it is considered a New York "classic" rap song.

== Track listing ==
Digital Single

No.	Title	Writer(s)	Producer(s)	Length
1.	"Shot Caller"	Karim Kharbouch, Charlie Jimenez	Harry Fraud	2:59

== Chart performance ==
Chart (2012)	Peak position
US Bubbling Under Hot 100 Singles (Billboard)	24
US Hot R&B/Hip-Hop Songs (Billboard)	39
US Rap Songs (Billboard)	23
