= French Montana =

Moroccan and American rapper (born 1984)

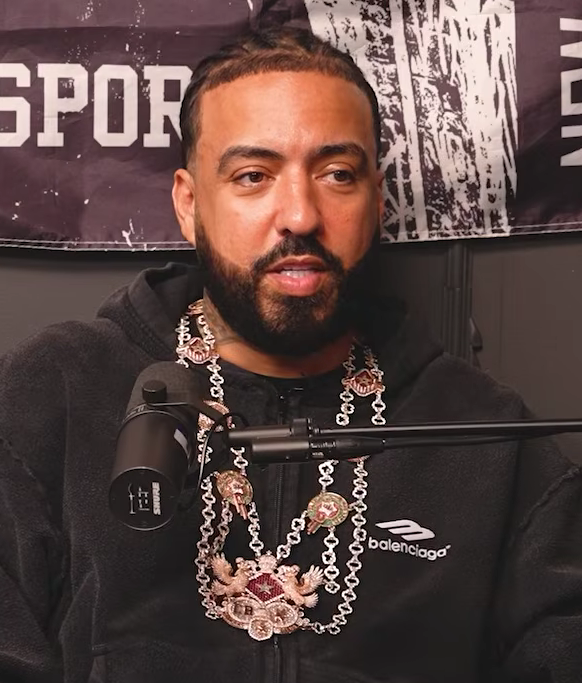
- French Montana in 2026

Background information
- Also known as: Young French
- Born: Karim Kharbouch; November 9, 1984 (age 41); Casablanca, Morocco
- Origin: The Bronx, New York City, U.S.
- Genre: East Coast hip-hop
- Occupations: Rapper; singer; songwriter; record producer
- Works: French Montana discography
- Years active: 2002–present
- Labels: gamma.; Epic; Montana; Coke Boys; Bad Boy; Maybach Music; Interscope; Konvict; Evil Empire
- Producer(s): Harry Fraud; Sean Combs
- Spouse: Deen Kharbouch (m. 2007; div. 2014)
- Partner(s): Mahra Al Maktoum (2025–present; engaged)
- Children: 1
- Website: frenchmontana.com

Logo
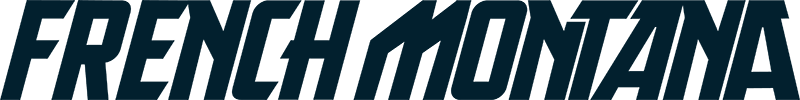

Karim Kharbouch (Arabic: كريم خربوش [kæɾiːm χɑɾbuːʃ]; born 9 November 1984), known professionally as French Montana, is a Moroccan and American rapper. Born and raised in Morocco, he immigrated to New York City with his family at the age of 13 and began his career as a battle rapper in the early 2000s — under the name Young French. He first gained recognition hosting the locally-tailored DVD series Cocaine City during the 2000s, which centered around interviews of hip hop figures. He pursued a recording career while doing so, releasing several underground projects before signing with Sean Combs's Bad Boy Records and Rick Ross's Maybach Music Group, in a triple-joint venture with Interscope Records in 2012.

Kharbouch's debut studio album, Excuse My French (2013), peaked at number four on the Billboard 200 despite critical failure; its lead single, "Pop That" (featuring Rick Ross, Drake, and Lil Wayne), peaked within the top 40 of the Billboard Hot 100. His 2017 single, "Unforgettable" (featuring Swae Lee), peaked within the chart's top 10, and received diamond certification by the Recording Industry Association of America (RIAA). It preceded his second studio album Jungle Rules (2017), which was met with similar commercial success—peaking at number three on the Billboard 200—and a critical incline. His third and fourth albums, Montana (2019) and They Got Amnesia (2021), were both met with lukewarm critical and commercial reception; the latter served as his final release on a major label.

Kharbouch founded the record label Coke Boys Records (previously known as Cocaine City Records) in 2008, which has signed Chicago rapper Lil Durk, as well as fellow New York artists including Velous, Chinx, and record producer Harry Fraud. He is the most streamed African-born musical artist, and is the first African-born artist to have a diamond-certified song by the RIAA. In 2024, "Unforgettable" became the most-streamed song from New York. Outside of music, Kharbouch has been prolific in charitable and philanthropic endeavors.

== Early life ==
Karim Kharbouch was born on November 9, 1984, in Casablanca, Morocco. He grew up at the family estate outside Casablanca where he lived for the first 13 years of his life. Kharbouch has claimed that he has Moroccan, Ethiopian, and Somali ancestry. Growing up, he was consumed with soccer and rap, describing them as his two favorite childhood hobbies, before getting into basketball in his later teens.

In the mid-1990s, Kharbouch left Morocco with his parents and younger brother for New York City, where they settled in the South Bronx. Kharbouch spoke only his native languages of Moroccan Darija Arabic and French when he first arrived, and learned English in the streets and in the Bronx high schools of Roosevelt and Lehman. After struggling for two years, his father decided they would move back to Casablanca, but his mother opted to stay back with their children citing lack of opportunities back home. His mother was pregnant with his youngest brother at the time, who was born in the United States shortly after his father departed for Morocco. With three children, his mother was dependent on welfare for financial support. Kharbouch eventually found himself the primary breadwinner for the family.

== Career ==
=== 2002–2010: Cocaine City Records ===
Kharbouch began his career as a battle rapper in his teens under the name Young French. In 2002, Kharbouch and close friend Cams created a series of street DVDs called Cocaine City, drawing inspiration from the Smack DVD series popular at the time. The series featured interviews with major and upcoming rappers, personalities, and a focus on street music and hip hop beefs. Initially as Young French, he used the DVDs as a means of showcasing his talent as an underground artist, including in it his original music, freestyles, and collaborations with other artists. The first volume in the series featured Pee Wee Kirkland and Remy Ma, among others. What started out as a medium for developing an audience, quickly grew into one of the top-selling street DVDs. The series ran for eight years between 2002 and 2010, totaling 14 volumes, and multiple spinoff films. Based out of the Bronx, Kharbouch ran the series with the help of childhood friends including Brock, Droop Pop and Cheeze, who went on to become the first rappers that formed the Coke Boys.

In 2003, Kharbouch suffered a gunshot to the head when he was confronted by two gunmen as he was leaving a recording studio in the Bronx. The incident resulted in one of the gunmen dead, in what is believed to be a case of "friendly fire" by one assailant against the other. Kharbouch was then hospitalized for several weeks. Upon discharge, he discovered that he was set up by someone close to him and his circle.

In 2007, Kharbouch released his debut mixtape French Revolution Vol. 1, which included collaborations with Uncle Murda, Jae Millz, Mazaradi Fox and Tony Yayo. The track "Quarter to Eight" was the first of many collaborations with Rick Ross. The J. Cardim-produced "Straight Cash" was Kharbouch's first underground hit. In 2008, he released his second mixtape, Live From Africa. The song "Waavvy" was the first collaboration with rapper Max B.

Kharbouch and Max B released their debut collaborative mixtape Coke Wave on February 6, 2009. A few weeks later, on February 23, Max B's mixtape Quarantine was released, while French released his The Laundry Man on February 24, 2009. The two artists resumed concentrating on their solo records, until the release of their second collaborative mixtape Coke Wave 2 in November that year.

Kharbouch was included in XXL's Freshman Class of 2012. At that time he had already been signed to Bad Boy Records following the success of his single "Shot Caller", and had just signed a joint-venture between Bad Boy and Maybach Music Group.

==== Harry Fraud and the Chinatown raid ====
In an interview with Rolling Stone magazine, close friend and producer Harry Fraud revealed first meeting French Montana during a recording session at a studio in Chinatown. Fraud recalls recording a song for someone which French happened to have a guest feature on. In an unusual turn of events, the building was raided by police after a tip-off that there were counterfeit Gucci and Louis Vuitton purses being manufactured at the same building. Having lost his studio spot, Fraud went on to form his own studio in Brooklyn, where the two "met and formed a bond".

Harry Fraud, who hails from a musical family background and had interned at a recording studio, was still unknown professionally at the time. The two released their first collaboration "New York Minute", featuring Jadakiss, from French's fifth mixtape Mac Wit Da Cheese released on April 19, 2009. Following its success, the two artists recorded "We Playin In The Wind" from French's sixth mixtape The Laundry Man 2 released on June 29. With "New York Minute" still buzzing in the city, rapper Ma$e would approach French Montana to hop on the remix, included in French's eighth mixtape Coke Wave 2 released in November. Since then, Harry Fraud's production has been a staple among French's music, and Fraud has since ventured out into working with various other artists. Fraud gained mainstream attention when his track with French Montana "Shot Caller" became one of the most added tracks on urban contemporary radio in 2011–2012.

==== Gaby Acevedo and signing with Akon ====
Starting in 2009, Kharbouch had signed a deal with Akon and his Konvict Music label. The two previously met in Miami in 2008, and later appeared on DJ Green Lantern's "Invasion Radio" on SiriusXM's Hip-Hop Nation. The pair collaborated on a series of tracks including their first single "Married to the Streets" on French's seventh mixtape Cocaine Konvicts released on September 25. In later interviews, Kharbouch revealed that he had a "shopping deal" with Akon for a six months to a year period. "A shopping deal is when an artist takes a liking in you, and they try to take you to a label to get you signed. I was gonna go get signed to his label, but they were going through problems with Interscope. [As a result] my deal was over with him, so I went and did my own thing", claimed French in his 2012 interview with Complex. Akon, whom Kharbouch refers to as "big brother", would continue to maintain a relationship with French, collaborating on songs together despite the unsuccessful deal between the two.

Kharbouch had met Akon through their mutual friend Gaby Acevedo. Acevedo was then-president of SRC Records – under founder and chairman Steve Rifkind — the label first responsible for breaking out artists such as Akon, David Banner, and Remy Ma, then a member of Fat Joe's Terror Squad. Acevedo, whom French had befriended during his time working on the Cocaine City DVDs, had put his music on to Akon who then approached French inviting him to meet him in Florida. Although the Akon deal was short-lived, Acevedo would eventually go on to become French's manager following his mainstream breakout. In 2012, with Rifkind leaving SRC's parent company Universal Music Group in September, the SRC imprint would close shop as well. With Kharbouch's management deal with Mizay Entertainment having recently ended, Gaby Acevedo would postpone retirement to become his new manager, where he now spends his time on the road touring with Kharbouch.

=== 2010–2011: "Choppa Choppa Down" and southern breakout ===
Kharbouch released his tenth mixtape Coke Boys on September 15, 2010, which included collaborations with Three 6 Mafia, Gucci Mane, Akon, Fat Joe, fellow Coke Boys, among others. The record which included the track "Choppa Choppa Down", featuring Waka Flocka Flame, became a hit among clubs and radio throughout the south. Waka Flocka, who recently broken into the mainstream with his single "Hard In Da Paint" released on May 13, had recorded the song earlier that year while Gucci Mane was still in prison. An early remix to the song, featuring French Montana, was included in French's ninth mixtape Mac & Cheese 2 released earlier that year on May 6 and which also included collaborations with rising stars Wiz Khalifa, Nicki Minaj, Big Sean, Curren$y and Nipsey Hussle among others. The two respective breakout tracks would kick off the start of a close relationship between French and Waka Flocka, where the two describe themselves as being "brothers".

==== Signing with Debra Antney ====
On November 18, 2010, XXL magazine reported on Kharbouch having signed with Atlanta-based management firm Mizay Entertainment, headed by Debra Antney. Debra, who is Waka Flocka's mother, was also manager to Gucci Mane, OJ Da Juiceman, rising star Lex Luger and the 808 Mafia production team, and formerly Nicki Minaj prior to her mainstream breakout. The music video for "Choppa Choppa Down", which featured a Black Hawk Down theme, was released in late-January and included cameos from Gucci, Shawty Lo, DJ Holiday and members of Brick Squad Monopoly. With the success of the Coke Boys mixtape and his recent management deal with Debra, French adopted a recurring trap influence among his music. in 2013, Debra Antney sued Kharbouch for dealing behind her back for commission. In 2017, Debra won the lawsuit against him for which he was obliged to pay $2 million to Debra.

On February 15, Kharbouch released his eleventh mixtape Mister 16: Casino Life, which featured productions from Fraud and Lex Luger among others, including his soon-to-be next hit "Shot Caller". The tape's combination of hard trap beats alongside the more soulful beats – such as those of his New York producer Harry Fraud – would become a fixture among French's music. The latter sound being further explored in his twelfth mixtape Coke Boys 2 released on August 19, providing a softer break from his more robust tapes that year. Both records have been acclaimed for their production and hooks. Kharbouch would continue on his increasing presence in the South, releasing his collaborative mixtape with Waka Flocka called Lock Out on December 14. That same month, he would release his long-awaited collaborative mixtape Cocaine Mafia with Memphis-based rappers Juicy J and Project Pat, released on December 19. This would be Kharbouch's thirteenth and fourteenth mixtapes, respectively. With four records out in 2011, it would be his busiest year of releases since 2009. In a 2012 interview with Parlé magazine, Kharbouch revealed his deal with Mizay Entertainment as having been for a year and a half.

==== Collaborating with Rick Ross ====
With Kharbouch's growing buzz in the South, he was approached by Florida-based rapper Rick Ross who invited him to his studio. Kharbouch, who admits having been a fan of Ross' music, was invited to come "at like three in the morning" where he listened to his upcoming MMG collaborative album Self Made Vol. 1. The two recorded a track for the album, while Ross hopped on the remix to "Choppa Choppa Down". The new single, which also featured Wiz Khalifa, was released on April 28, 2011, with the music video coming out in June. An earlier remix featuring Gucci Mane and Wiz Khalifa had been released on March 25. The collaboration would mark the start of French's relationship with Rick Ross and his Maybach Music Group, prompting speculation whether Kharbouch would be signing to the label.

=== 2011–2012: "Shot Caller" and New York takeover ===
With Kharbouch juggling between Atlanta and New York, his song "Shot Caller" from the Casino Life record would gain traction on New York radio beginning mid-2011. During an on-air interview with Fat Joe on DJ Green Lantern's "Invasion Radio" in October 2011, Kharbouch would call in to praise close friend and fellow-Bronx rapper Fat Joe, revealing his role in helping to get "Shot Caller" on the airwaves. Fat Joe, whom he refers to as "big brother", praised Kharbouch's work ethic and revealed that Kharbouch had been receiving offers from several major labels.

==== Jim Jones bottle-throwing incident ====
On the night of August 5, 2011, Bronx-based rapper Fat Joe was slated to host Funkmaster Flex's birthday party at Webster Hall. During his performance, Fat Joe brought out Kharbouch to perform on stage. Controversy erupted as Jim Jones and his entourage, who were reportedly on the adjacent balcony seats, began hurling bottles and glass at the performers. The following day, videos of the incident were uploaded online, depicting Kharbouch and his entourage facing a barrage of glass and liquor on stage, as they continued performing his rendition of "Hard In Da Paint" while facing the mentioned balcony with the crowd chanting along to it. Some of the members on stage hurled debris back towards the balcony, as Jones and his entourage eventually exited the premises.

==== Collaborating with Diddy ====
Fat Joe and Waka Flocka accompanied Kharbouch in his video shoot for "Shot Caller" later that month in August. The song, which made reference to Diddy's 1997 hit "It's All About the Benjamins", would soon garner the interest of the Bad Boy mogul. On October 9, Kharbouch announced Diddy and T.I. for the official remix to the song. DJ Drama, who called it his favorite record, referred T.I. to jump on the remix. Although the T.I. feature never came to fruition, the remix was released on November 24, and featured rappers Diddy and Rick Ross.

With "Shot Caller" already one of the most played tracks on New York radio, on stations such as Hot 97 and Power 105, Kharbouch was slated to appear on the upcoming episode of BET's 106 & Park on December 6, where he would be debuting the music video and announcing the label he's signing with. Diddy would also appear that night as part of his "Bad Boy Takeover" campaign, whereon the two officially announced that French Montana had signed to Bad Boy Records. Between 2011 and 2012, "Shot Caller" had become one of the most added tracks on urban contemporary radio in the country. It was re-released as a single on January 10, and the music video for the remix was released in February 2012. A "NY Giants remix" premiered on Funkmaster Flex's radio show on January 6, celebrating the Giants' Super Bowl win against the Patriots the day before.

=== 2012–2016: Signing to Bad Boy and MMG ===
Having received offers from several labels, including Jay-Z's Roc Nation and Kanye's GOOD Music; on December 6 on BET, Kharbouch publicly announced signing with Bad Boy Records, an imprint of Interscope Records. In a subsequent interview with Billboard magazine, Kharbouch revealed that had he not signed with Bad Boy that MMG would be his next choice. However, on January 4, 2012, while in the studio with Rick Ross, the two announced Kharbouch's new signing to a joint-venture between Bad Boy Records and Maybach Music Group, making him a part of both labels. Both Ross and Diddy would be executive producing his debut studio album.

==== "Stay Schemin" and "Pop That" ====
On January 6, the two dropped Ross' track "Stay Schemin" with rapper Drake. Notable for its memorable Kharbouch and Ross "hook", the track became one of the biggest hits that year, oft-talked about for its Drake verse believed to be a "diss" towards rapper Common at the time. Kharbouch was featured on XXL's Freshman Class of 2012 alongside Future, Kid Ink, Danny Brown, Macklemore, Don Trip, Hopsin, Iggy Azalea, Roscoe Dash, and Bad Boy labelmate MGK. Kharbouch later revealed to host Sway Calloway on MTV's RapFix Live in August 2012 that he almost turned down the cover opportunity feeling he deserved it a year or two prior.

Kharbouch's first single from the upcoming album, "Pop That" was released on June 15, featuring Ross, Drake and Lil Wayne. The song would be one of the biggest hits that year, and a still-popular club and summer anthem since. It is Kharbouch's most successful commercial single, having been certified "platinum" by the RIAA, and peaking at No. 2 on Billboard's Hot R&B and Rap charts and No. 36 on the Hot 100. While initially expected for a release in July 2012, Kharbouch's album went through several pushbacks until its finalized release date of May 21, 2013. The date which happened to coincide with the birthdays of Max B and famous label mate Notorious B.I.G. In the meantime, Kharbouch had released his fifteenth mixtape Coke Boys 3 on April 13, 2012, which included collaborations with fellow Coke Boys Chinx Drugz and Cheeze, alongside the likes of Ross, Akon, Kevin Gates and Wale. Notable tracks among others include, a rare collaboration between French, Chinx and Stack Bundles on "Tap That", and "Headquarters" featuring Red Café and Chinx, the music video for which premiered on July 21.

==== The Homecoming and Mac & Cheese 3 ====
In September 2012, French Montana was featured on the cover of the 82nd issue of The Fader magazine, who joined French on his first homecoming to Morocco after seventeen years since his family moved to the United States in 1996. The article describes his journey through Morocco, meeting his mother's family, and eventually his estranged father who is not made aware of his son's coming arrival. French was accompanied by manager Gaby Acevedo, and youngest brother Ayoub, in addition to Zach Baron and Michael Schmelling of The Fader. The piece ends with an emotional reunion between the father and the two sons, including Ayoub who had previously never met their father before.

French marked the end of the year with his sixteenth mixtape Mac & Cheese 3 released on November 20, 2012. which included collaborations with Prodigy, Fabolous, Future, Fat Joe, Ma$e, Rico Love and Trina among others. Acclaimed for its production and track selection, it was among the most downloaded mixtapes of all time. With several productions from Young Chop, the music video to "Devil Wants My Soul" premiered on November 5, and an in-studio video of "Ocho Cinco" on November 26. Both songs would go viral, prompting another music video for "Ocho Cinco" – featuring Diddy, MGK, Red Café and King Los – released in February 2013. The song was also included as a bonus track on the upcoming Excuse My French album. The run up to which included further video releases, including the Black Metaphor produced "Sanctuary" (named after sample song "Sanctuary" from Kingdom Hearts II) on February 3, Swizz Beatz produced "Diamonds" featuring Ross and J. Cole on February 17, and Fraud produced "State of Mind" on May 15 and "Intro (Only If For A Night)" on November 30, among others. Since the tapes' premiere on DatPiff, it would reach the 500K "double platinum" rating by first month, and presently stands at a "diamond" rating with over 1.4 million downloads on that site alone.

==== Excuse My French ====
In January 2013, French announced his second single "Freaks", featuring Nicki Minaj, from his upcoming album to be a remake of Lil Vicious' 1994 song of the same name. The song premiered on Hot 97 on February 13, with the music video coming out on March 3. The remix, featuring an additional Ross, Wale, Mavado and DJ Khaled, was released on April 25. A bonus track "Marble Floors" was released earlier on December 4, 2012, featuring Ross, Lil Wayne and 2 Chainz with production from Mike WiLL Made It. It would fast become a viral hit, only to be outdone by French's third single "Ain't Worried About Nothin" released on April 15, 2013. The music video premiered on May 7, and would be the last before the release of his album on May 21. Subsequent music videos included, "Trap House" featuring Ross and Birdman released on September 23, "Gifted" featuring The Weeknd on October 15, "Once In A While" featuring Max B on November 18, and "Paranoid" featuring Johnny May Cash on January 20, 2014, among others.

His first solo single "Ain't Worried About Nothin" was a hit on radio stations, and a remix featuring Ross, Diddy and Snoop Dogg was released on October 4, and a second remix featuring Miley Cyrus on October 14. Upon its release, Excuse My French was met with mixed reviews from music critics. It fared better commercially, debuting at number 4 on the Billboard 200 chart, with first-week sales of 56,000 copies in the United States. The album also featured collaborations with Raekwon, Scarface, Ne-Yo and Jeremih among others.

Following the album release, French announced signing Chicago-based rapper Lil Durk to his Coke Boys. French, who is close to producer Young Chop, had previously collaborated with Durk on his recent mixtape and with Chief Keef on his debut album the year before. Durk, Chinx and Young Chop appeared in the music video to "Paranoid", featuring Chop's brother Johnny May Cash. The song is inspired by French's brushes with death, including the late-2003 incident where he survived a gunshot to the head. Durk collaborated on several records with French in the coming years, starting with the remix to Durk's breakout single "Dis Ain't What U Want" featuring French, Ross and Meek Mill, released on November 27, 2013.

French appeared as a featured artist on several singles in 2013, most notably Joe Budden's "NBA" with Wiz Khalifa released on March 26; ASAP Ferg's "Work (Remix)" – alongside Schoolboy Q, ASAP Rocky and Trinidad James – on May 14; Canadian singer Massari's "Shisha" on May 21; and Will.i.am's "Feelin Myself" with Miley Cyrus and Wiz Khalifa on November 26, among others.

==== Pushbacks and comebacks ====
Despite several pushbacks, French released his seventeenth mixtape Coke Boys 4 on January 2, 2014, which included collaborations with Snoop Dogg, Wiz Khalifa, MGK, Mally Mall, Lil Durk and MeetSims, among others. The music video for the "Paranoid (Remix)" – featuring Diddy, Ross, Meek, Durk, Chinx and Jadakiss – was released on April 13. Subsequent music videos included, "88 Coupes" featuring Jadakiss released on May 15, "God Body" featuring Chinx on May 28, and "Money Bag" with Durk and Chinx on June 23. In a January 2014 Rolling Stone interview, French revealed that his next Mac & Cheese would be a studio album instead of a mixtape.

In 2014, French collaborated with Diddy on Ross' track "Nobody" released on February 19. Rick Ross' remake of Notorious B.I.G.'s 1997 song "You're Nobody (Til Somebody Kills You)", featured an eerie chorus by French and interludes of Diddy in a live motivational rant. The song was inspired by Ross' brush against death the year before, when his Rolls-Royce came under repeated gunshot fire while driving through Fort Lauderdale, Florida, on January 28, 2013. In a bizarre series of events, French Montana would experience a similar but unrelated event months later when his convoy came under fire on March 1 in Philadelphia during his "Excuse My French" tour after French had finished performing a show hours earlier. The music video premiered on February 27, 2014. Albeit met with mixed to positive reviews, the song would be a hit and was re-released as a single on March 3, 2014. French joined Ross for a live performance on the television program Late Night with Seth Meyers on March 5, 2014.

French Montana collaborated with fellow-Bronx native Jennifer Lopez on her promotional single "I Luh Ya Papi". The song premiered on LA's Power 106 on March 5, and was released as a single on March 11, with the music video coming out two days later. The single was an international hit, and among the most added/played tracks on rhythmic contemporary radio in Canada. French also appeared in the music video to Fat Joe's single "Stressin", featuring Jennifer Lopez, which premiered in October later that year. French joined Rick Ross on Puff Daddy's comeback single "Big Homie" from his upcoming album MMM. With a guest verse by Ross and ad-libs by French, the single was released on March 24, with the music video premiering on March 31. French Montana joined Ross, Meek and veteran Jay-Z on DJ Khaled's summer hit "They Don't Love You No More". The single was released on March 29, with the music video coming out on June 22 that year.

On July 17, teasers to the movie The Purge: Anarchy were released featuring music from French's upcoming single "Don't Panic". A month earlier, Instagram photos of the two showed French with then-girlfriend Khloé Kardashian on set with matching masks on, prompting speculation whether she was in the coming video. Following weeks of promotion, the single was released on August 12. The music video, which retained the dark themes of the movie while maintaining its catchy DJ Mustard character, became a viral hit. The couple had created bit of a stir two months earlier, on June 2, when Khloé posted an IG photo of the two on set of "They Don't Love You No More", depicting French holding a rifle in his arms with Khloé seated next to him with a bottle of liquor to her mouth. The remix to "Don't Panic", featuring Jeremih and Chris Brown, was released on October 14.

French Montana joined Remy Ma on DJ Khaled's "They Don't Love You No More (Remix)" released on August 2. Khaled's former Terror Squad affiliate and Bronx-native Remy Ma had just been released from prison the day prior. The three appeared together in the music video which premiered on August 23. This was her first musical comeback since her incarceration six years earlier. French collaborated with Ashanti on her second single "Early In The Morning" released on October 14 from her comeback album, Braveheart. This would be Ashanti's first album in six years.

French released his second single "Bad Bitch", featuring Jeremih, in December 2014, with the music video premiering on February 23, 2015. In late-October, French had announced his "Set It Off" tour with Jeremih, running up to his expected Mac & Cheese: The Album release in December. With the album eventually pushed back to next year; in its place, French released his collaborative EP with Harry Fraud, Mac & Cheese: The Appetizer on December 12, 2014. His eighteenth mixtape, The Appetizer marked a shift away from French's usual feature-heavy records. With Fraud's signature sample-heavy production, French blurred the lines between rap and R&B in a manner not unlike that of Max B, and with subject matter ranging from difficult life-decisions, women, addiction and memories of his bygone friendship with his now-incarcerated rap soulmate. In August 2015, French paired with pop-opera artist Charisse Mills for the single "Champagne."

=== 2016–present: Wave Gods, MC4, Jungle Rules, Montana, They Got Amnesia ===
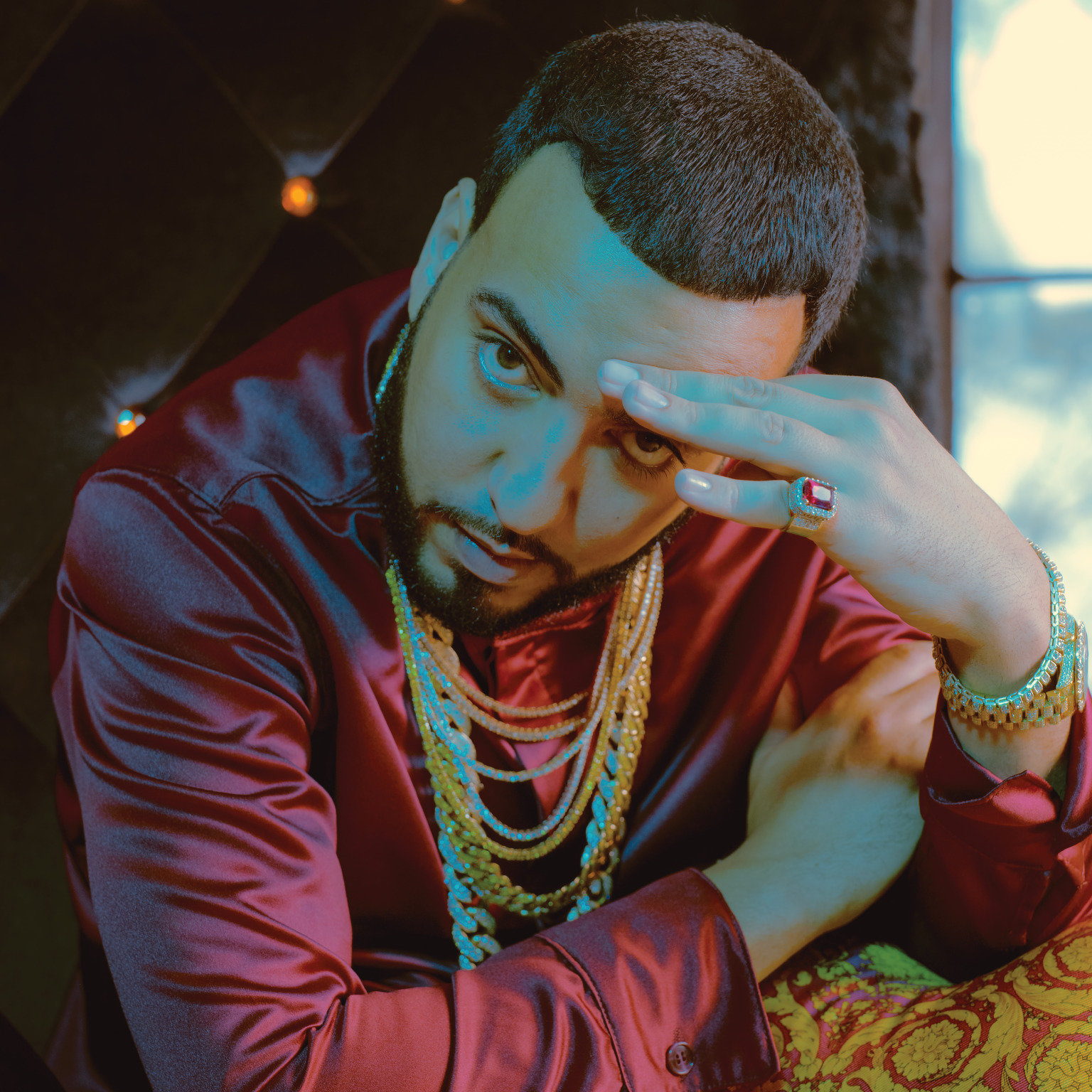
French Montana in 2017

On February 14, 2016, DJ Khaled announced that he would debut French's new mixtape on We The Best Radio. The mixtape, hosted by Max B, debuted on February 19, 2016. On May 5, 2016, French's contract with Interscope and MMG ended, and he signed a joint venture record deal with Bad Boy and Epic Records. French planned to release his second studio album MC4 in October 2016, however, the album's release was canceled after Target unofficially released the album on CD on its original release date (August 19, 2016), two months before the album was set to release, also leaking in its entirety on internet, as well as having some "sample clearance issues" on tracks like "I'm Heated" and 2 Times". It was originally supposed to be the fourth installment in the "Mac & Cheese" series, and the first to be originally released as an album. French later stated that he's planning to start a new record label with Max B when he is released. On November 5, 2016, Montana unexpectedly released the album as a mixtape instead and premiered it on Drake's Beats 1 radio show, OVO Sound radio later that night. Montana revealed in an interview with Zane Lowe on his Beats 1 radio show that the first and second single from his upcoming project is ready to be released. He also announced a collaborative track with Chance the Rapper and Quavo, produced by Ben Billions, a collaboration with Swae Lee that is "just like 'Unforgettable'", as well as a song called "No Stylist". On July 14, 2017, Montana released Jungle Rules as his second album.

On December 6, 2019, French Montana released his third studio album Montana, which includes the song "Writing on the Wall", a collaboration with Cardi B, Post Malone and Rvssian.

In March 2020, Montana was sued by a woman using the pseudonym "Jane Doe", for assault and battery, sexual battery, intentional infliction of emotional distress, negligent hiring, supervision and retention and negligence, in connection to a March 28, 2018, incident reported to police in which the woman alleged Montana drugged her and raped her while she was incapacitated on his bathroom floor. The suit was dismissed pursuant to a settlement on April 13, 2022.

Montana's fourth studio album, They Got Amnesia was released through Epic Records on November 19, 2021, including the singles "FMWGAB", "I Don't Really Care", "Panicking", a collaboration with American rapper Fivio Foreign, and "Handstand", a collaboration with American rapper and singers Doja Cat and Saweetie. Similarities were noted in the lyrics of the track "How You King?" with Norwegian singer Astrid S' song "Jump". Astrid S retroactively got proper attribution as a co-songwriter and receives compensation on the track.

French Montana, on June 9, 2022, released a song "Je M'appelle" with fellow Moroccan-British artist Benzz and Tion Wayne.

In 2023, the documentary "The French Montana Story: For Khadija" premiered at the Tribeca Film Festival. Directed by Mandon Lovett and co-executive produced by Sean "Diddy" Combes and Drake, the film documents the story of his family's emigration from Morocco to New York, and explores the plight of his single immigrant mother raising three sons and his rise to success as a recording artist.

== Philanthropy ==
In Uganda, Kharbouch filmed the music video for his single "Unforgettable" in 2017. His efforts in Uganda raised an estimated US$500,000 to build the Suubi hospital.

In 2018, Kharbouch was named an Ambassador for Global Citizen following his charitable donation of $100,000 for a hospital in Uganda. In 2022, it was reported that he helped raise over US$220 million for Uganda's maternal healthcare services. He received a 2022 Innovator Award for his efforts the same year.

== Personal life ==
Kharbouch is a native-speaker of Moroccan Arabic and French, and became fluent in English after immigrating to the US. He cites being a father as one of his driving inspirations. He is a practicing Sunni Muslim.

Kharbouch has been a resident of the Pompton Plains section of Pequannock Township, New Jersey. In 2016, he bought Selena Gomez's Calabasas, California home for $3.3 million.

Kharbouch married Deen Kharbouch in 2007. The couple had separated by 2012, and their divorce was finalized in 2014. They have a son who was born in October 2010. In 2016 Kharbouch briefly dated Australian rapper Iggy Azalea. In August 2025, his engagement to Mahra Al Maktoum, a princess of Dubai, was announced.

In June 2018, Kharbouch became a U.S. citizen.

In 2020 Kharbouch was sued for sexual battery after allegedly raping an intoxicated woman in his home. The suit was settled out of court in 2022.

=== Shooting incident ===
In 2003, two gunmen shot at Montana as he left a recording studio in New York, striking him in the head. He survived and was hospitalized for several weeks. One of the gunmen died during the incident, in what is believed to be a case of "friendly fire" by one assailant against the other. Montana was investigated for the incident, but the case was eventually dismissed. In early 2013, Montana visited the site of the shooting with a camera crew from Life+Times as he recalled the near-death experience and his life growing up in the Bronx. This was the first time he had visited the location since the attempted murder ten years earlier. According to French, he was set up by someone close to him and his circle.

=== Exotic pets ===
French has been the owner of a number of pets, ranging from dogs to exotic animals such as tigers and a monkey. On April 22, 2013, French Montana posted an Instagram picture with the caption "Got so high last night bought 2 baby tigers". The picture was of French outdoors holding two tiger cubs, one on each arm. The tigers, named Ike and Tina, were prominently featured in French's music video for "The Gifted" featuring friend and singer The Weeknd, released later that year. In 2014, the rapper noted he had given up the two tigers shortly after getting them, citing the difficulty in feeding and caring for the animals.

Since late-2014, French Montana became the owner of a pet monkey named Julius Ceasor. A video of the animal was uploaded on December 18, showing French and record producer Mally Mall entering a private-jet with French then cradling the infant monkey in his arms.

== Musical influences ==
French Montana describes Tupac Shakur, The Notorious B.I.G., Nas, Snoop Dogg, and Wu-Tang Clan among the hip hop artists he listened to growing up. He considers himself a music lover in general, and admires the work of English soul/R&B singers Adele and Amy Winehouse, the English rock band Florence + the Machine, and American singer Lana Del Rey, several of whom he has sampled in his music.

== Discography ==
Studio albums

- Excuse My French (2013)
- Jungle Rules (2017)
- Montana (2019)
- They Got Amnesia (2021)

== Filmography ==
Film
Year	Title	Role	Notes
2016	The Perfect Match	Himself	
2018	The After Party	Himself	
2024	The French Montana Story: For Khadija	Himself	
TBA	All-Star Weekend †	TBA	Completed

Television
Year	Title	Role	Notes
2011	Ridiculousness	Himself	Episode: "French Montana"
2013	Wild 'n Out	Himself	Season 5, episode 5
2014–2016	Late Night with Seth Meyers	Himself	2 episodes
2014	Keeping Up with the Kardashians	Himself	Episode: "Secrets of a Double Life"
2014–2015	Kourtney and Khloé Take The Hamptons	Himself	3 episodes
2015	Wild 'n Out	Himself	Season 7, episode 6
2016	Love & Hip Hop: New York	Himself	Episodes: "Ups & Downs", "All the Way Up"
2016–2017	The Real	Himself / Musical Guest	3 episodes
2016	Empire	Vaughn	Episodes: "Light in Darkness", "Chimes at Midnight"
2017	America's Next Top Model	Himself / Recording Artist	Episode: "The Comeback"
2017	Hip Hop Squares	Himself / Contestant	Episode: "Fat Joe vs French Montana"
2018	The Four: Battle for Stardom	Himself / Performer	Episode: "Finale"
2019	NCIS: New Orleans	Himself / Performer	Episode: "Jackpot"

== Awards and nominations ==
=== African Muzik Magazine Awards ===
Year	Nominee / work	Award	Result
2014	French Montana	Best Male Diaspora	Nominated

=== Berlin Music Video Awards ===
Year	Nominee / work	Award	Result
2022	I DON'T REALLY CARE	Best VFX	Nominated

=== BET Awards ===
Year	Nominee / work	Award	Result
2013	"Pop That"	Best Collaboration	Nominated

=== BET Hip Hop Awards ===
Year	Nominee / work	Award	Result
2013	"Pop That"	Best Club Banger	Won
2013	"Pop That"	Reese's Perfect Combo Award (Best Collabo, Duo or Group)	Nominated
2016	"All the Way Up" (with Fat Joe & Remy Ma, and Infared)	Best Hip Hop Video	Nominated
2016	"All the Way Up" (with Fat Joe & Remy Ma, and Infared)	Best Collabo, Duo or Group	Won
2016	"All the Way Up" (with Fat Joe & Remy Ma, and Infared)	People's Champ Award	Nominated
2016	Wave Gods	Best Mixtape	Nominated

=== Billboard Music Awards ===
Year	Nominee / work	Award	Result
2015	"Loyal"	Top R&B Song	Nominated

=== Grammy Awards ===
Year	Nominee / work	Award	Result	Ref.
2016	"All Day" (as a songwriter)	Best Rap Song	Nominated	
2017	"All the Way Up" (with Fat Joe & Remy Ma and Infared)	Best Rap Song	Nominated	
2017	"All the Way Up" (with Fat Joe & Remy Ma and Infared)	Best Rap Performance	Nominated	

=== iHeartRadio Titanium Awards ===
iHeartRadio Titanium Awards are awarded to an artist when their song reaches 1 Billion Spins across iHeartRadio Stations.

Year	Nominee/Work		Result
2017	"Unforgettable" ft Swae Lee"	1 Billion Total Audience Spins on iHeartRadio Stations	Won
