= I Think She Like Me =

Single by Rick Ross featuring Ty Dolla $ign

from the album Rather You Than Me
- Released: January 26, 2017
- Recorded: 2016
- Genre: Hip hop; R&B
- Length: 4:02
- Label: Maybach; Epic
- Songwriters: William Roberts II; Jorge Pilot; Cordale Quinn; Tyrone Griffin, Jr.; Thomas Bell; Linda Epstein
- Producers: J-Pilot; C-Gutta; Makkis

Rick Ross singles chronology
"Buy Back the Block" (2016)	"I Think She Like Me" (2017)	"Trap Trap Trap" (2017)

Ty Dolla Sign singles chronology
"Are You Sure?" (2016)	"I Think She Like Me" (2017)	"Blessings" (2017)

"I Think She Like Me" is a song by American hip hop recording artist Rick Ross, featuring vocals from American singer Ty Dolla $ign. The hip hop and R&B song was released on January 26, 2017 as the lead single of Ross' ninth studio album Rather You Than Me, with the record labels Maybach Music Group and Epic Records. The song was produced by C-Gutta and J-Pilot.

The song contains a sample of "People Make the World Go Round" by The Stylistics.

== Music video ==
On January 26, 2017 Ross uploaded the music video for "I Think She Like Me" on his YouTube and Vevo account.

As of March 2024, the music video sits at 28 million views.

== Charts ==
Chart (2017)	Peak position
US Bubbling Under Hot 100 (Billboard)	13
US Bubbling Under R&B/Hip-Hop Singles (Billboard)	5
US R&B/Hip-Hop Airplay (Billboard)	31
