= Port of Miami 2 =

Studio album by Rick Ross
- Released: August 9, 2019
- Genre: Hip hop
- Length: 66:29
- Label: Maybach; Epic
- Producer: Beat Billionaire; Cardiak; Cameone; DJ Toomp; Dollarz; H-Money; J.U.S.T.I.C.E. League; Jake One; Just Blaze; JV; MajorNine; Noc; Oz; The Rascals; Rowan; Sam Sneak; Streetrunner; Syk Sense; Tarik Azzouz; Trop; Vinylz

Rick Ross chronology
Rather You Than Me (2017)	Port of Miami 2 (2019)	Richer Than I Ever Been (2021)

Singles from Port of Miami 2
- 1. "Act a Fool" Released: June 21, 2019; 2. "Big Tyme" Released: July 2, 2019; 3. "Gold Roses" Released: July 26, 2019

Port of Miami 2 is the tenth studio album by American rapper Rick Ross. It was released on August 9, 2019, by Maybach Music Group and Epic Records. The album features guest appearances from Wale, Gunplay, Summer Walker, Dej Loaf, Swizz Beatz, Meek Mill, Nipsey Hussle, Teyana Taylor, Jeezy, YFN Lucci, Ball Greezy, A Boogie wit da Hoodie, Denzel Curry, John Legend, Lil Wayne, and Drake. Port of Miami 2 serves as the sequel to Ross' debut album, Port of Miami, released in 2006. It was supported by three singles: "Act a Fool", "Big Tyme", and "Gold Roses".

== Background ==
On July 16, 2019, the album's release date was announced. On July 31, Rick Ross was featured in an interview on Big Boy's Neighborhood radio show in which he said:

Releasing two albums, it was a statement that was made. I hope I made that statement, coming back full circle to my 10th album. Port of Miami 1 being everything I built the empire on, just me coming back. And I wanna have that challenge of comparing it because to me, ultimately, I just wanna be even sharper than I was back then.

Ross shared the album's tracklist on August 1, 2019.

== Artwork ==
The artwork, an homage to the original Port of Miami cover depicts Ross holding a pendant with a picture of Black Bo, his friend and manager, who died in December 2017.

== Promotion ==
The album's lead single, "Act a Fool" featuring Wale, was released on June 21, 2019, the song peaked at number 45 on the Hot R&B/Hip-Hop Songs.

The second single, "Big Tyme" featuring Swizz Beatz, was released on July 2, 2019, the music video for the song was released on July 30.

The third single, "Gold Roses" featuring Drake, was released on July 26, 2019, the song peaked at number 39 on the Billboard Hot 100.

=== Promotional singles ===
"Turnpike Ike" was released as a promotional single on August 6, 2019.

== Critical reception ==
Professional ratings
Aggregate scores
Source	Rating
Metacritic	67/100
Review scores
Source	Rating
AllMusic	3.5/5 stars
Clash	8/10
HipHopDX	3.5/5
HotNewHipHop	79%
NME	3/5 stars
Pitchfork	6.6/10
Rolling Stone	3/5 stars

Port of Miami 2 was met with generally positive reviews. At Metacritic, which assigns a normalized rating out of 100 to reviews from professional publications, the album received an average score of 67, based on seven reviews.

Aaron Bishop of Clash wrote that Port of Miami 2 "shows Renzel with his pen at his sharpest, his beats at their grandest and his coveted guest verse spots at their most impactful. Over a decade at the top of the rap mountain has seen the MMG icon have his ups and downs. But on what is his tenth studio album, he proves why he’s achieved such longevity in the fickle game that is rap. Tracks such as "Turnpike Ike" showcase the four-time Grammy nominee at his very best, while his willingness to delve into topics outside of his luxurious lifestyle add a depth and gravitas to the record that make it a worthy successor to the original thirteen years on." Andy Kellman of AllMusic saying "Frequent serious references to mortality make Port of Miami 2 his heaviest recording." Evan Rytlewski of Pitchfork stated: "Too often on Port of Miami 2, he locks into the flow of least resistance and simply lets it ride, hiding behind his production instead of asserting his dominion over it. And while his music remains sumptuous as always, that luster alone is no longer enough to wow."

In a mixed review, Rolling Stone's Christopher R. Weingarten stated: "Most of his 10th album, Port of Miami 2, is Ross exactly as you know and love him: the obscene boasts, the window-cracking bass, the speedboat cool, the various spins on raps-to-riches success." Will Lavin of NME said, "While the beginning of the album struggles, you'll be hard pushed to find a five-song stretch as flawless as the close out tracks on Ross' 10th studio album." Jesse Fairfax of Spin wrote that "Port of Miami 2 further cements Ross as a mainstay among the aging elite—those rappers whose names now carry them further than their music does. Playing it safe with the sequel to his far more ambitious debut LP, Ross regurgitates that which people have come to love from him, or at least have accepted as his standard."

== Commercial performance ==
Port of Miami 2 debuted at number two on the US Billboard 200, behind Slipknot's sixth album We Are Not Your Kind, with 80,000 album-equivalent units, of which 25,000 were pure album sales. It is Ross's 10th US top 10 album.

== Track listing ==
Port of Miami 2 track listing
No.	Title	Writer(s)	Producer(s)	Length
1.	"Act a Fool" (featuring Wale)	William Roberts II; Olubowale Akintimehin; Shamann Cooke	Beat Billionaire	4:46
2.	"Turnpike Ike"	Roberts II; Jacob Dutton; Samuel Saint-Jean; Edward Levert; Robert Dukes	Jake One	4:20
3.	"Nobody's Favorite" (featuring Gunplay)	Roberts II; Richard Morales, Jr.; David Bermudez	Trop	4:05
4.	"Summer Reign" (featuring Summer Walker)	Roberts II; Summer Walker; Harmony Samuels; Rhyon Brown; Brian Alexander Morgan; Jaco Pastorius	H-Money; JV	3:46
5.	"White Lines" (featuring Dej Loaf)	Roberts II; Deja Trimble; Carlos Martin; Michael Cerda; Michael Hernández; Carlos Suarez	Rowan; Cameone	3:19
6.	"Big Tyme" (featuring Swizz Beatz)	Roberts II; Kasseem Dean; Justin Smith; Kenneth Lewis; Brent Kolatalo	Just Blaze	4:02
7.	"Bogus Charms" (featuring Meek Mill)	Roberts II; Robert Williams; Sam Harvey; Nicholas Warwar; Tarik Azzouz; Melanie Pereira; Saint-Jean; Jeffery Robinson	Streetrunner; Azzouz	4:01
8.	"Rich Nigga Lifestyle" (featuring Nipsey Hussle and Teyana Taylor)	Roberts II; Ermias Asghedom; Carl McCormick; Will Gittens; Thomas Bennett; Mic Lovay; Robert Curington; Rudy Love	Cardiak	4:09
9.	"Born to Kill" (featuring Jeezy)	Roberts II; Jay Jenkins; Bermudez	Trop	4:40
10.	"Fascinated"	Roberts II; Corey Burroughs; Thomas Bennett; Avery Branch; Bill Withers	Dollarz; Sam Sneak	5:25
11.	"I Still Pray" (featuring YFN Lucci and Ball Greezy)	Roberts II; Rayshawn Bennett; Kinta Cox; Aldrin Davis; Ernest Isley; Marvin Isley; Kelly O'Isley; Ronald Isley; Rudolph Isley; Christopher Jasper	DJ Toomp	4:56
12.	"Running the Streets" (featuring A Boogie wit da Hoodie and Denzel Curry)	Roberts II; Artist Dubose; Denzel Curry; Chad Thomas; Saint-Jean	MajorNine	3:44
13.	"Vegas Residency"	Roberts II; Teedra Moses; Erik Ortiz; Kevin Crowe; Raphael Ramos; Paul Williams	J.U.S.T.I.C.E. League; Noc	5:19
14.	"Maybach Music VI" (featuring John Legend and Lil Wayne)	Roberts II; John Stephens; Dwayne Carter, Jr.; Ortiz; Crowe; Hubert Eaves III	J.U.S.T.I.C.E. League	4:02
15.	"Gold Roses" (featuring Drake)	Roberts II; Aubrey Graham; Ozan Yildirim; Joshua Scruggs; Anderson Hernandez; Leon Thomas III; Khristopher Riddick-Tynes; Noel Cadastre; Sylvain Krief; Boris Bergman	Oz; Syk Sense; Vinylz; The Rascals	5:49
Total length:				66:29

Notes

- "Big Tyme" features background vocals by Ken Lewis
- "Bogus Charms" features vocals by Sam Harvey and November Ultra
- "Rich Nigga Lifestyle" features vocals by Will Gittens
- "Fascinated" features vocals by Bishop
- "Vegas Residency" features vocals by Teedra Moses

Sample credits

- "Turnpike Ike" contains a sample from "Help (Someone Please)", written by Eddie Levert and Robert Dukes, and performed by The O'Jays.
- "Summer Reign" contains a sample from "Rain", written by Brian Alexander Morgan and Jaco Pastorius, and performed by SWV.
- "Rich Nigga Freestyle" contains a sample from "Does Your Mama Know", written by Will Gittens, Thomas Bennett, Mic Lovay, Robert Curington, and Rudy Love, and performed by Rudy Love & The Love Family.
- "Fascinated" contains a sample from "Ain't No Sunshine", written by Bill Withers, and performed by Lyn Collins.
- "I Still Pray" contains a sample from "Let's Fall in Love (Parts 1 & 2)", written by Ernest Isley, Marvin Isley, Kelly O'Isley, Ronald Isley, Rudolph Isley, and Christopher Jasper, and performed by The Isley Brothers.
- "Vegas Residency" contains a sample from "Faust", written and performed by Paul Williams.
- “Maybach Music 6” contains a sample from “Love Eyes”, written by Hubert Eaves and performed by Art Webb.
- "Gold Roses" contains a sample from "Israël Suite", written by Sylvian Krief and Boris Bergman, and performed by Rupture.

== Personnel ==
Credits adapted from Tidal.

Instrumentation

- Ken Lewis – guitar, horn, strings (track 6)
- Brent Kolatalo – bass, drums, keyboards (track 6)
- Maxime Breton – guitar (track 7)
- Joshua "Principal Muzik" Everett – piano (track 13 14)
- Alex Page – strings (tracks 13, 14)
- Tyler Cates – guitar (tracks 13, 14)
- Joshua Vincent – horn (track 14)
- Jonah Vincent – horn (track 14)
- J Troy Bass – bass (track 14)
- Gumbi Ortiz – percussion (track 14)

Technical

- David Anthony "Trop" Bermudez – recording (tracks 1, 3–6, 9, 10, 14, 15)
- Thomas "Tomcat" Bennett – recording (tracks 2, 7, 8, 11, 12)
- Fabian Marasciullo – mixing (tracks 1–5, 8–12, 15)
- Thomas McLaren – mixing (track 3), engineering assistant (tracks 1, 2, 4, 5, 8–12, 15)
- Just Blaze – mixing (track 6)
- Finis "KY" White – mixing (track 7)
- Leslie Brathwaite – mixing (tracks 13, 14)
- Colin Leonard – mastering (tracks 1–8, 10–15)
- Ian Kimmel – engineering (track 6)

== Charts ==
=== Weekly charts ===
Chart performance for Port of Miami 2
Chart (2019)	Peak position
Australian Albums (ARIA)	79
Belgian Albums (Ultratop Flanders)	60
Belgian Albums (Ultratop Wallonia)	134
Canadian Albums (Billboard)	8
Dutch Albums (Album Top 100)	15
French Albums (SNEP)	78
Lithuanian Albums (AGATA)	92
Swiss Albums (Schweizer Hitparade)	39
UK Albums (Official Charts)	18
US Billboard 200	2
US Top R&B/Hip-Hop Albums (Billboard)	1

=== Year-end charts ===
2019 year-end chart performance for Port of Miami 2
Chart (2019)	Position
US Top R&B/Hip-Hop Albums (Billboard)	78
