= Nobody (Rick Ross song) =

Promotional single by Rick Ross featuring French Montana

from the album Mastermind
- Released: March 3, 2014
- Recorded: 2013
- Genre: Hip hop
- Length: 4:41
- Label: Maybach Music Group; Slip-n-Slide Records; Def Jam Recordings
- Songwriters: William Roberts; Sean Combs; Karim Kharbouch; Christopher Wallace; Stevie J; Ephrem Lopez; Jiv Poss
- Producer: Sean Combs

"Nobody" is a song by American hip hop recording artist Rick Ross, taken from his sixth studio album, Mastermind (2014), released through Maybach Music Group, Slip-n-Slide Records, and Def Jam Recordings.. The song, produced by P. Diddy, features a guest appearance by rapper French Montana. It was written by Ross, Diddy, and Montana themselves, alongside The Notorious B.I.G., Stevie J, DJ Enuff and Jiv Poss.

On February 19, 2014, it was released as the album's third promotional single. Upon its release, "Nobody" was met with generally positive reviews from music critics, who praised Ross' lyrics and the Biggie Smalls sample. Commercially, the track debuted at number 38 on the US Billboard Hot R&B/Hip-Hop Songs and number 23 on the Hot Rap Songs chart, alongside peaking at number 8 on the Bubbling Under Hot 100 Singles Chart.

== Background and composition ==
On February 19, 2014, Rick Ross released the song's audio for free online as a promotional single for his sixth studio album Mastermind. Along with the release of the song's audio, Ross said, "I went back and listened to the Big record in a totally different way. At the end of the day, regardless of how graphic it may be, it's a beautiful piece of art. It's a beautiful art sculpture. Its original creator was The Notorious B.I.G.; I just came and I put my hands on it." The song features rapper French Montana singing the refrain of the song, while it breaks in multiple points where Diddy is ranting on an unknown person. Ross spoke on Diddy's appearance saying, "That was really a Puff session. Going in on someone. That was him schooling some dudes. And the little homie from Revolt, you know, just politely kept that record button on. So, that's my little homie. So, when he played it for me I'm like 'Yo, let's transfer this, man.' And we made it right and when I went and played it for Puff, you know, I kept it 100. Told him 'I know what the set was. I'll never give up who you was talking to.' Because y'all know 'em."

"Nobody" focuses on the drive by shooting on January 28, 2013 in Fort Lauderdale, Florida, that Ross survived. In the incident an unidentified gunmen fired at least 18 bullets at Ross' Rolls-Royce. It also looks at the self-reliant and lonely life of a gangster. The song significantly samples The Notorious B.I.G.'s "You're Nobody (Until Somebody Kills You)" from his second studio album Life After Death, which was released after his death in 1997. Ross spoke on the sample usage saying, "It's that much love for B.I.G, but what even the true B.I.G. fans gotta respect—Because you know when I made the record I did it the G way. I took it to D-Roc, you know, Biggie right-hand. He blessed the joint. You know what I mean? And that's what was important to me. You know, he could have told me to kill it and I would have chilled. So, that was a lot of love. And just for everybody that's hearing the record that don't—haven't heard the original, go get both of B.I.G.'s albums right now."

It was rumored that the person Diddy was talking to in the video was Bad Boy Records artist King Los. On March 19, 2014, while talking to Sway Calloway on MTV's Rapfix Live, Los stated that the infamous rant at the beginning of the song was somewhat directed toward Los himself. Los said, "I love the mystique of this, so I'ma let this play out a little bit, but boy, your intuitive skills. Nah, I had something to do with it. I won't say that he was. He knows how to prepare moments and in those moments, have something rollin'. I will say this. I have the full conversation. That's only bits and fragments that y'all heard. There's much more. Man, listen, there was more devastating things said." That same day Los announced that he had departed from Bad Boy Records.

== Critical reception ==
"Nobody" was met with generally mixed to positive reviews from music critics. Chris Coplan of Consequence of Sound said, "It's still mostly that same hoarse, uncomplicated rumble, but with some upticks in cadence and the overall structure of his rhymes, he's sounds just enough like Biggie to result in a totally touching homage." Jesse Cataldo of Slant Magazine stated, the song was a "shameless, fascinatingly derivative." Jon Caramanica writing for The New York Times said, "It's a simultaneously labored and entrancing track, both a natural fit for Mr. Ross's storytelling and a brazen borrowing of a fallen giant's legacy. Mr. Ross didn't fully own it here. French Montana — himself a regular and happy pilferer of the 1990s — came out to sing the song's hook, and Mr. Ross regarded him calmly, maybe lazily."

Nathan S of DJBooth.net said, ""Nobody"'s notable for its Biggie sample and influence, but beyond the sample, I don't think it'll prove to have anywhere near the impact and longevity Ross and Diddy were apparently aiming for." Ken Capobianco of The Boston Globe said, on the song his "conflated swagger tips into caricature." Craig Jenkins of Pitchfork Media stated, "Given a shot at breaking kayfabe and speaking on the incident, Ross largely opts out, spitting street rap boilerplate in a Biggie cadence he can never quite pull off." Brandon Soderberg of Spin criticized the song for having zero insight or perspective.

== Live performances ==
On March 5, 2014, Rick Ross performed "Nobody" on Late Night with Seth Meyers along with French Montana. He also closed his appearance on The Arsenio Hall Show the following day by performing the song. Ross then performed the song during his sets at SXSW.

== Music video ==
An unofficial music video for the song, directed by Maybach Music Group's Dre Films, was released on February 21, 2014. Four days later a teaser for the official music video was released. On February 27, 2014, the official music video for the song was released. The video begins with a cinematic retelling of the January 2013 drive-by shooting that targeted Rick Ross. Diddy starts things off in the video with the song's opening monologue. As detectives watch him on a surveillance monitor, Diddy chastises a couple of his associates. Montana then performs the refrain of the song from an interrogation room as a police officer tapes his statement. Meanwhile, Ross who is dressed in a black sports jacket and white collared shirt, lights a cigar as he begins his testimony. Overall it follows a murderous double-cross with Ross narrating the story. The final scene of the videos reveals a decapitated man's body lying in a ditch as the mysterious man featured throughout the video walks off into the darkness.

Jordan Sargent of Fuse spoke of the video saying, the story "is mostly incoherent and hard to follow. The highlight of the video is the stark cinematography, with fluorescent lights reflecting off of Ross' perfectly circular sunglasses. As he exhales smoke, looking commanding and wealthy, we're treated to as perfect and accurate a representation of his character as we've seen in a while."

== Charts ==
| Chart (2014) | Peak position |
|---|---|
| US Bubbling Under Hot 100 (Billboard) | 8 |
| US Hot R&B/Hip-Hop Songs (Billboard) | 38 |
| US Hot Rap Songs (Billboard) | 23 |
