= No Games (song) =

Single by Rick Ross featuring Future

from the album Mastermind (intended)
- Released: September 6, 2013
- Recorded: 2013
- Genre: Hip hop
- Length: 3:53
- Label: Maybach Music Group; Slip-n-Slide Records; Def Jam Recordings
- Songwriters: Kenneth Bartolomei; Kevin Crowe; Erik Reyes-Ortiz; Rick Ross; Future
- Producer: J.U.S.T.I.C.E. League

Rick Ross singles chronology
"I Wanna Be with You" (2013)	"No Games" (2013)	"The Devil Is a Lie" (2013)

Future singles chronology
"Honest" (2013)	"No Games" (2013)	"Ready" (2013)

"No Games" is a hip-hop song by American rapper Rick Ross, featuring vocals from American rapper Future. It was released as the second promotional single for his sixth studio album, Mastermind on September 6, 2013, when it was serviced to mainstream urban radio. The song was produced by frequent collaborators producers J.U.S.T.I.C.E. League.

== Background and release ==
On September 5, 2013, the track was uploaded on Def Jam's YouTube channel. The next day it was serviced to mainstream urban radio as a single. The song became available for digital download on September 30, 2013.

== Music video ==
The music video for "No Games" was filmed on October 10, 2013. This video was directed by Colin Tilley, visual effects were created by GloriaFX. On November 3, 2013, the music video was released.

== Remix ==
On December 3, 2013, the official remix to "No Games" was released, it featured Future, and Maybach Music Group artists Meek Mill and Wale.

== Chart performance ==
Chart (2013)	Peak position
US Bubbling Under Hot 100 (Billboard)	19
US Hot R&B/Hip-Hop Songs (Billboard)	50

== Release history ==
Country	Date	Format	Label
United States	September 6, 2013	Mainstream urban radio	Maybach Music Group, Def Jam Recordings
United States	September 24, 2013	Urban contemporary radio	Maybach Music Group, Def Jam Recordings
United States	September 30, 2013	Digital download	Maybach Music Group, Def Jam Recordings
United States	October 22, 2013	Rhythmic contemporary radio	Maybach Music Group, Def Jam Recordings
