= Thug Cry =

Single by Rick Ross featuring Lil Wayne

from the album Mastermind
- Released: March 13, 2014
- Recorded: 2013
- Genre: Hip hop
- Length: 4:24
- Label: Maybach; Slip-n-Slide; Def Jam
- Songwriters: William Roberts II; Dwayne Carter, Jr.; Erik Ortiz; Kevin Crowe; Kenny Bartolomei; Anes Ansouri "Enesse"; Adam Carter; Damani Thompson; Opio Lindsey; Tajai Massey
- Producer: J.U.S.T.I.C.E. League

Rick Ross singles chronology
| "The Devil Is a Lie" (2013) | "Thug Cry" (2014) | "They Don't Love You No More" (2014) |

Lil Wayne singles chronology
| "We Alright" (2014) | "Thug Cry" (2014) | "Believe Me" (2014) |

"Thug Cry" is a song by American hip hop recording artist Rick Ross, released on March 13, 2014 by Maybach, Slip-n-Slide, and Def Jam, as the 2nd and final official single from his sixth studio album Mastermind (2014). The song was produced by J.U.S.T.I.C.E. League, written by Betty Idol and features a guest appearance by American rapper Lil Wayne, along with a hook performed by Betty Idol. The song has since peaked at number 37 on the US Billboard Hot R&B/Hip-Hop Songs chart. The sample comes from "Heather" by Billy Cobham (1974), which was previously used in songs such as "93 'til Infinity" by Souls Of Mischief (1993) and in "No Wheaties" by Big K.R.I.T., Smoke DZA & Curren$y (2010).

== Release ==
"Thug Cry" was serviced to mainstream urban radio in the United States on March 13, 2014 and then to rhythmic contemporary radio in the same country on April 1, 2014 as the third official single from his sixth studio album Mastermind.

== Music video ==
On May 5, 2014, the music video was released for "Thug Cry". The video follows a prisoner, played by actor Wood Harris, as he steps out of jail after serving time. Flashbacks reveal Harris' sentencing leading up to his prison sentence. The video then ends with Ross, Yo Gotti, and friends, welcoming Harris home, giving him a Rolls-Royce.

== Chart performance ==
| Chart (2014) | Peak position |
|---|---|
| UK Singles (Official Charts Company) | 193 |
| UK Hip Hop/R&B (Official Charts) | 37 |
| US Bubbling Under Hot 100 (Billboard) | 12 |
| US Hot R&B/Hip-Hop Songs (Billboard) | 37 |

== Certifications ==
| Region | Certification | Certified units/sales |
|---|---|---|
| United States (RIAA) | Gold | 500,000^{‡} |
^{‡} Sales+streaming figures based on certification alone.
