= Sanctified (song) =

2014 song by Rick Ross featuring Kanye West and Big Sean

Song by Rick Ross featuring Kanye West and Big Sean

from the album Mastermind
- Released: March 3, 2014
- Recorded: 2014
- Genre: Hip hop
- Length: 4:49
- Label: Maybach Music Group; Slip-n-Slide Records; Def Jam Recordings
- Songwriters: William Roberts; Sean Anderson; Kanye West; Dijon McFarlane
- Producers: Kanye West; Mike Dean; DJ Mustard (co.)

"Sanctified" is a song by American rapper Rick Ross, taken from his sixth studio album Mastermind (2014). The song, produced by Kanye West, Mike Dean, and DJ Mustard, featuring guest appearances by rappers Kanye West and Big Sean. It was written by the aforementioned rappers and producers and Betty Wright sang the hook.

"Sanctified" garnered critical acclaim from music critics, with most praising the production and Kanye West's appearance. It is the highest-charting song on Mastermind to date, debuting at number 25 on the UK R&B Chart, number 78 on the US Billboard Hot 100 and number 99 on the Canadian Hot 100 upon the album's release.

== Background and development ==
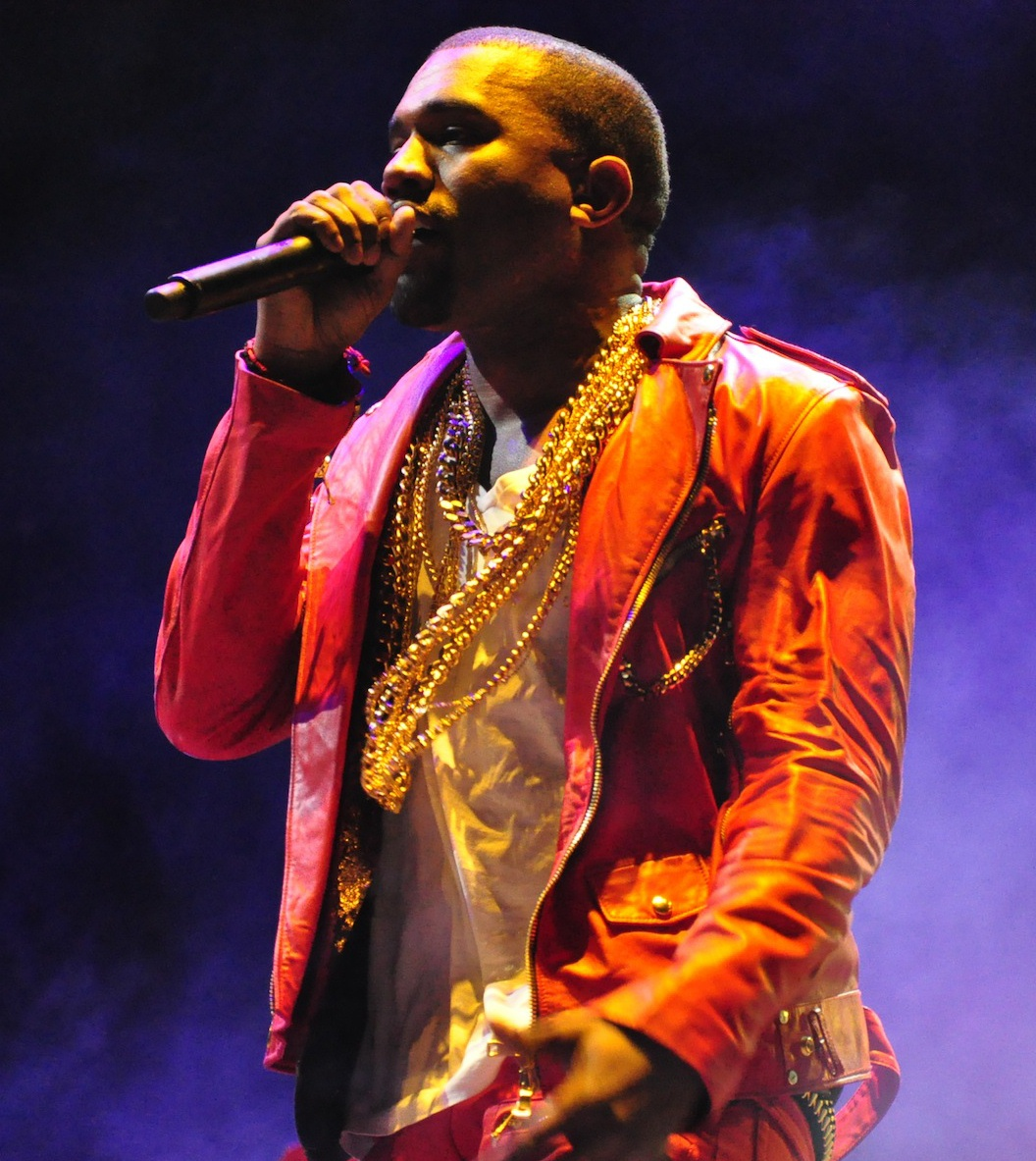
Kanye West was the song's primary producer and he also makes a guest appearance.

In February 2014, a short preview of the song was released featuring the chorus, performed by Kanye West and Big Sean. Following the track list reveal for the album, on February 7, 2014, producer DJ Mustard revealed that he co-produced "Sanctified" with Kanye West. The song was also produced by Mike Dean, along with being written by William Roberts, Sean Anderson, Kanye West, and Dijon McFarlane. Betty Wright lent her vocal talent to the song during a late night studio session she did as a favor to DJ Khaled in order for him to meet a deadline. She recorded the hook in fifteen minutes while sitting on a sofa In the song, West raps about how he feels about people playing up his earlier works and dismiss who he is now, before saying that he's not going to worry about it. Then later he says, "Wipe my forehead with a handkerchief and wash my sins in the blood of Jesus, People sayin', 'Ye, we need another Yeezus." This being a reference to his experimental sixth studio album.

Rick Ross stated that the song was one of his favorites featured on Mastermind. He said, "'Sanctified' was most definitely one of the favorites. It's because how much time—Just watching Kanye put into this because it actually started as a sample. We did the sample maybe 10 different ways and then we ultimately went with a beautiful lady out of Miami, Ms. Betty Wright. She blessed us. So, just hearing that chorus. Just hearing the way it came out. All the time we put in it. It most definitely was dope." Then after Ross' sixth studio album Mastermind was released for free streaming on iTunes, the full version of "Sanctified" was released.

On March 6, 2014, Big Sean released his verse for the song that was cut from the album version of the song. Detailing the song's recording process to MTV, Big Sean said, "Me and [Kanye West] was in the studio working on a whole bunch of ideas and [Ross] came in the conversation. And everybody know Rick Ross albums is events. So Ye pulled a track up, and I was telling him I think it's a banger, it's a smash, and he thought we should give it to Rozay. Me and him wrote our verses on the spot and we sent it to [Ross] and he did what he did to it."

== Critical reception ==
"Sanctified" was met with critical acclaim from music critics, with most of them favoring West's guest appearance over Ross himself. Mikael Wood of The Los Angeles Times called it the album's best song. Kevin Ritchie of Now named it the album's best song, praised Betty Wright's performance singing the hook and Kanye West's production. Nick Catucci of Entertainment Weekly and Michael Madden of Consequence of Sound both considered the song one of the album's best. Kellin Miller of AllHipHop stated that it "has a strong case for an early song of the year nomination." Dan Rys of XXL praised the song's production and called West's appearance as show stealing. Jesse Cataldo of Slant Magazine said, "The album revives when Kanye West shows up to produce and guest on "Sanctified," a revival song that pairs religious rebirth with monetary excess in a sort of frenzied ritual."

Peter Cashmore of NME stated that it "is a glorious snail’s-pace gush of braggadocio. In fact, if the album had wrapped up after "Sanctified", rather than dribbling to a close with the weedy "Walkin’ On Air" and "Thug Cry", then Mastermind would be pretty much wall-to-wall bangers." Craig Jenkins of Pitchfork gave this song the tag of "Best New Track" and stated, "'Sanctified' is an outstanding entry into Ross and Kanye’s catalogue of stunners, but it never feels like Ross' song." Christopher Weingarten of Rolling Stone said, the song "shines with guest singer Betty Wright's powerful gospel rasp and Kanye West confessing his sins on a featured verse. Ross, meanwhile, ends up talking designer clothes and fellatio." Ken Capobianco of the Boston Globe said that "Kanye West turns his host into an afterthought on the fine, gospel-influenced "Sanctified".

Sheldon Pearce of HipHopDX stated, "While Kanye is transposing himself with Muhammad Ali and washing his sins in the blood of Jesus and boldly second guessing God’s direct message the most grandiose thing Ross can muster is an ill-fated (and perhaps uninformed) comparison to fallen Waco cult leader David Koresh. It feels tired and uninspired." Nathan Slavik of DJBooth praised the song's depth and said it featured "a rewind-worthy verse from Kanye and a completely superfluous Big Sean." Jesal Padania of RapReviews called the song riotously enjoyable, but said that Ross' contribution did not add anything to the song.

Complex named it the second best song of the first half of 2014. Writer Justin Charity commented saying, "While hardly their strongest verses of even the past couple years, Ross, Kanye, and Sean all come correct with the quotables here, from Sean's opening mantra to Kanye's aggressive confessional to post-sex grilled cheese. The song's weary gospel build-up makes way for the minimal, rarefied ecstasy of that spaceship hangover melody. An arena confession I need to be shouting at the livest of live shows by year's end: "All I wanted was a hundred million dollars and a bad bitch!" Verdict: We need another Yeezus." MySpace also named the song one of the 50 best songs of the same time period. A writer for them said, "'Sanctified' is a behemoth of a track, replete with an original vocal line from Bettye LaVette that plays like a gospel sample and an impeccable verse from 'Ye that makes up for Ross rapping, "Fellatio's amazin', make grilled cheese for you, the best." It's simply the best gospel song masquerading as a rap jam this year."

== Live performance ==
On March 6, 2014, Rick Ross, Big Sean and Kanye West performed "Sanctified" on The Arsenio Hall Show backed by a live band. This was the first live performance of the song with all three rappers. West's surprise appearance received a very large response from the audience.

== Credits and personnel ==
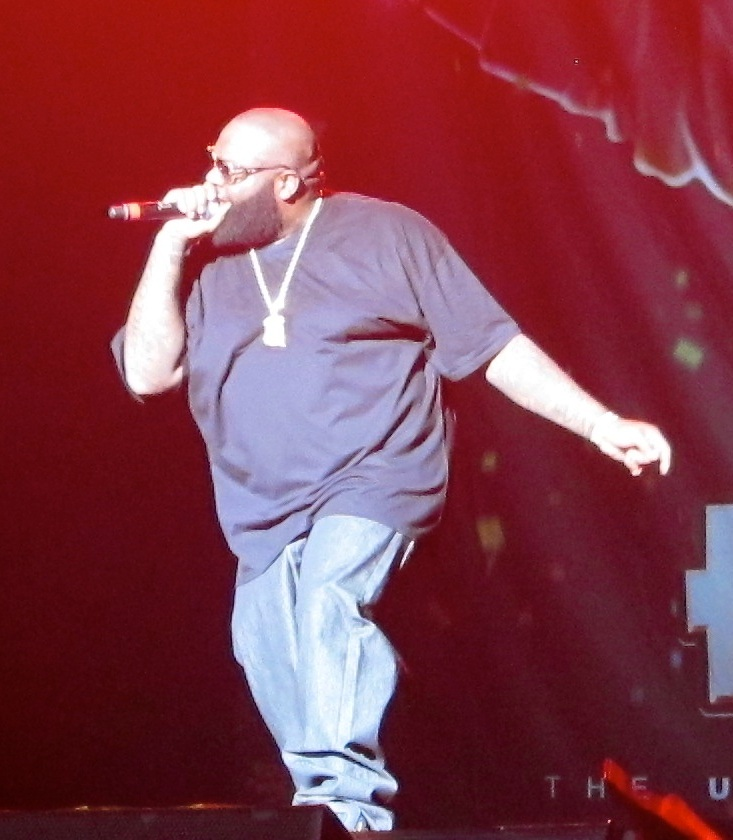
Rick Ross performed lead vocals and did songwriting on "Sanctified".

Credits adapted from the liner notes of Mastermind.

- Rick Ross – lead vocals, songwriting
- Kanye West – guest vocals, songwriting, production
- Betty Wright – guest vocals
- Big Sean – guest vocals, songwriting
- DJ Mustard – co-production/original production
- Mike Dean – production

== Chart performance ==
Chart (2014)	Peak position
Canada (Canadian Hot 100)	99
Mexico Ingles Airplay (Billboard)	32
UK Hip Hop/R&B (OCC)	25
UK Singles (The Official Charts Company)	133
US Billboard Hot 100	78
US Hot R&B/Hip-Hop Songs (Billboard)	23
US Hot Rap Songs (Billboard)	11
