= Rather You Than Me =

Studio album by Rick Ross
- Released: March 17, 2017
- Studio: 25th Street (Oakland); Blakeslee (North Hollywood); Zenith (Georgia)
- Genre: Hip hop
- Length: 62:51
- Label: Maybach; Epic
- Producer: Analogic; Beat Billionaire; Beat Butcha; Bink; Black Metaphor; Buda & Grandz; C Gutta; MajorNine; The Olympicks; Sap; Streetrunner; Tarik Azzouz; Yung Coke

Rick Ross chronology
Black Market (2015)	Rather You Than Me (2017)	Port of Miami 2 (2019)

Singles from Rather You Than Me
- 1. "I Think She Like Me" Released: January 26, 2017; 2. "Trap Trap Trap" Released: May 16, 2017

Rather You Than Me is the ninth studio album by American rapper Rick Ross. It was released on March 17, 2017, through Maybach Music Group and Epic Records. The album features guest appearances from Raphael Saadiq, Chris Rock, Young Thug, Wale, Future, Jeezy, Yo Gotti, Gucci Mane, Ty Dolla Sign, Nas, Meek Mill, Anthony Hamilton, Scrilla, and Dej Loaf. It was supported by two singles: "I Think She Like Me", and "Trap Trap Trap".

Rather You Than Me charted at number three on the US Billboard 200, and received positive reviews from critics.

== Promotion ==
The album's lead single, "I Think She Like Me", was released on January 26, 2017. The song features a guest appearance from American recording artist Ty Dolla Sign. The music video for the song was released on January 27, 2017.

"Trap Trap Trap" was first released as the album's promotional single on March 10, 2017. The song features guest appearances from American rappers Young Thug and Wale. It was later released as the album's second official single on May 16, 2017.

=== Promotional singles ===
The album's first promotional single, "She on My Dick", was released on March 13, 2017. The song features a guest appearance from American rapper Gucci Mane.

The album's second promotional single, "Dead Presidents", was released on March 15, 2017. The song features guest appearances from American rappers Future, Jeezy and Yo Gotti.

== Critical reception ==
Professional ratings
Aggregate scores
Source	Rating
Metacritic	71/100
Review scores
Source	Rating
AllMusic	3/5 stars
Drowned in Sound	8/10
Exclaim!	6/10
HipHopDX	3.9/5
HotNewHipHop	82%
The Observer	4/5 stars
Pitchfork	6.9/10
RapReviews	7/10
Rolling Stone	3/5 stars
XXL	4/5

Rather You Than Me was met with generally positive reviews. At Metacritic, which assigns a normalized rating out of 100 to reviews from professional publications, the album received an average score of 71, based on nine reviews.

Damiem Morris of The Observer said, "The more modish tracks are somehow less inventive than their titles, but there's much southern-stewed, offbeat beauty elsewhere to compensate." Preezy of XXL said, "Nine albums removed from anonymity, Rather You Than Me secures Rick Ross' slot within the list Top 5 of rap soloists to emerge from the South over the last 20 years, and is among his more cohesive bodies of work to date." Jesse Fairfax of HipHopDX said, "Neither timeless nor immediately disposable, Rather You Than Me is an above average outing that displays why he's steadily remained within the public eye without having a long line of record-breaking hits." Steve "Flash" Juon of RapReviews said, "Rick Ross' Rather You Than Me is fun to listen to." Paul A. Thompson of Pitchfork said, "Rather You Than Me is a smooth, enjoyable attempt to wrestle the spotlight back onto his solo work." Kellan Miller of Drowned in Sound said, "Overall, Rather You Than Me is another example of Ross' gift at making albums, even though he litters the radio with corny one liners."

Andy Kellman of AllMusic said, "Ross' mixtures of outrageous fantasy and sobering reality, side-splitting humor, and piercing vengeance, are intermittently as potent as ever." Calum Slingerland of Exclaim! said, "It isn't without its flaws, but Rather You Than Me positions Rick Ross as the boss he's always claimed to be, his raps reinforced by lofty, gold-plated production and added lyrical depth that's as refreshing as a glass of Belaire Rosé." Mosi Reeves of Rolling Stone said, "Musically, he's drifting through a mid-career malaise. The beats he uses are the same worn poles of yacht-rap luxury and trap bangers that he's relied on since his 2010 watermark Teflon Don. Lyrically, he's still capable of speaking truth to power with remarkable clarity."

== Commercial performance ==
Rather You Than Me debuted at number three on the US Billboard 200 with 106,000 album-equivalent units, of which 70,000 were pure album sales.

== Track listing ==
Rather You Than Me track listing
No.	Title	Writer(s)	Producer(s)	Length
1.	"Apple of My Eye" (featuring Raphael Saadiq)	William Roberts II; Charles Wiggins; Chad Thomas; Myariah Summers	MajorNine	4:51
2.	"Santorini Greece"	Roberts II; Roosevelt Harrell III; Judy Bailey; John Parker	Bink	5:32
3.	"Idols Become Rivals" (featuring Chris Rock)	Roberts II; Byron Forest II; Rafael Perez-Botija	Black Metaphor	5:41
4.	"Trap Trap Trap" (featuring Young Thug and Wale)	Roberts II; Justin Cox; Jeffery Williams; Olubowale Akintimehin	Yung Coke	4:35
5.	"Dead Presidents" (featuring Future, Jeezy and Yo Gotti)	Roberts II; Shamann Cooke; Nayvadius Wilburn; Jay Jenkins; Mario Mims	Beat Billionaire	4:27
6.	"She on My Dick" (featuring Gucci Mane)	Roberts II; Cooke; Radric Davis	Beat Billionaire	3:45
7.	"I Think She Like Me" (featuring Ty Dolla Sign)	Roberts II; Cordale Quinn; Tyrone Griffin, Jr.; Thomas Randolph Bell; Linda Epstein	C Gutta; J Pilot^{[a]}	4:02
8.	"Powers That Be" (featuring Nas)	Roberts II; Jonathan King; Nasir Jones; Atia "Ink" Boggs	Sap	4:29
9.	"Game Ain't Based On Sympathy"	Roberts II; Harrell III	Bink	3:44
10.	"Scientology"	Roberts II; Harrell III	Bink	2:35
11.	"Lamborghini Doors" (featuring Meek Mill and Anthony Hamilton)	Roberts II; Nicholas Warwar; Tarik Azzouz; Robert Williams; Anthony Hamilton; Christopher Thorton; Diondra Thorton; Teedra Moses; Clemm Rishad; Ramon Montgomery	Streetrunner; Azzouz	4:23
12.	"Triple Platinum" (featuring Scrilla)	Roberts II; Andre Scott; Brian Wicker; Jesse James; David Stokes; Jeff Baranowski	The Olympicks; Analogic	6:12
13.	"Maybach Music V" (featuring Dej Loaf)	Roberts II; Katrina Russ; Francis Ubiera; Daniel Garcia; Eliot Dubock; Deja Trimble	Buda & Grandz; Beat Butcha	5:22
14.	"Summer Seventeen" (featuring Yo Gotti)	Roberts II; Cooke; Mims	Beat Billionaire	3:13
Total length:				62:51

Notes

- ^{^[a]} signifies a co-producer
- "Powers That Be" features additional vocals by Ink
- "Lamborghini Doors" features additional vocals by Dria and Teedra Moses
- "Maybach Music V" features additional vocals by Katt Rockell

Sample credits

- "Santorini Greece" contains elements from "Colours of My Dreams", written by Judy Bailey and John Parker, performed by Judy Bailey Quartet.
- "Idols Become Rivals" contains elements from "Agua de Dos Rios", written by Rafael Perez-Botiha, performed by Camilo Sesto.
- "I Think She Like Me" contains a sample from "People Make the World Go Round", written by Thomas Randolph Bell and Linda Epstein, as performed by The Stylistics.
- "Triple Platinum" contains an excerpt from the film Adjust Your Color.

== Charts ==
=== Weekly charts ===
Chart performance for Rather You Than Me
Chart (2017)	Peak position
Australian Albums (ARIA)	56
Belgian Albums (Ultratop Flanders)	159
Belgian Albums (Ultratop Wallonia)	99
Canadian Albums (Billboard)	16
Dutch Albums (Album Top 100)	32
French Albums (SNEP)	100
Swiss Albums (Schweizer Hitparade)	37
UK Albums (Official Charts)	29
UK R&B Albums (Official Charts)	4
US Billboard 200	3
US Top R&B/Hip-Hop Albums (Billboard)	2

=== Year-end charts ===
2017 year-end chart performance for Rather You Than Me
Chart (2017)	Position
US Billboard 200	124
US Top R&B/Hip-Hop Albums (Billboard)	50
