= Gold Roses =

Single by Rick Ross featuring Drake

from the album Port of Miami 2
- Released: July 26, 2019
- Length: 5:45
- Label: Maybach; Epic
- Songwriters: William Roberts II; Aubrey Graham; Ozan Yildirim; Joshua Scruggs; Anderson Hernandez; Leon Thomas III; Khristopher Riddick-Tynes; Sylvain Krief; Boris Bergman
- Producers: OZ; Syk Sense; Vinylz; The Rascals

Rick Ross singles chronology
"Big Tyme" (2019)	"Gold Roses" (2019)	"Down Like That" (2019)

Drake singles chronology
"Money in the Grave" (2019)	"Gold Roses" (2019)	"Won't Be Late" (2019)

"Gold Roses" is a song by American rapper Rick Ross featuring Canadian rapper Drake. It was released by Epic Records as the third single from Ross's album Port of Miami 2 on July 26, 2019. It follows Drake's "Money in the Grave" featuring Ross, which was released a month earlier in June 2019. The track contains samples from "Israël Suite", written by Sylvian Krief and Boris Bergman, and performed by Rupture. The song was nominated for Best Rap Song at the 62nd Annual Grammy Awards.

== Charts ==
Chart (2019)	Peak position
Australia (ARIA)	91
Canada Hot 100 (Billboard)	33
Ireland (IRMA)	76
Lithuania (AGATA)	70
New Zealand Hot Singles (RMNZ)	6
Switzerland (Schweizer Hitparade)	99
UK Singles (OCC)	42
UK Hip Hop/R&B (OCC)	25
US Billboard Hot 100	39
US Hot R&B/Hip-Hop Songs (Billboard)	16
US Rhythmic Airplay (Billboard)	34
US Rolling Stone Top 100	9

== Certifications ==
Region	Certification	Certified units/sales
Canada (Music Canada)	Gold	40,000^{‡}
United States (RIAA)	Platinum	1,000,000^{‡}
^{‡} Sales+streaming figures based on certification alone.
