= The Devil Is a Lie =

Single by Rick Ross featuring Jay-Z

from the album Mastermind
- Released: December 19, 2013
- Recorded: 2013
- Genre: Hip hop
- Length: 5:12
- Label: Maybach Music; Slip-n-Slide; Def Jam
- Songwriters: William Roberts; LeShawn Rogers; Willie McNeal; Shawn "Jay-Z" Carter
- Producers: Major Seven; K.E. on the Track

Rick Ross singles chronology
"No Games" (2013)	"The Devil Is a Lie" (2013)	"Thug Cry" (2014)

Jay-Z singles chronology
"Drunk in Love" (2013)	"The Devil Is a Lie" (2013)	"Part II (On the Run)" (2014)

Music video
- "The Devil Is a Lie" on YouTube

"The Devil Is a Lie" is a hip hop song by American rapper Rick Ross, featuring Jay-Z. It was released as the lead single from his sixth studio album, Mastermind on December 19, 2013. The song was produced by Major Seven and K.E. on the Track.

== Background ==
On October 23, 2013, Rick Ross announced that the album's second single, which will feature Jay-Z, will be released in early November 2013. The following day, Ross revealed that the song is titled "The Devil Is A Lie". He explained that song saying, "We're pushing the envelope once again and it's just one of those records I can't wait to hit the streets. We went in another direction but it's just one of those records that's gonna speak for itself and everybody's gonna have their opinion of it, but it's most definitely what the streets need." On December 19, 2013, the song was released for digital download. It was sent to urban contemporary radio in the United States on January 21, 2014. Dan Rys of XXL called the instrumental "the most massive beat we've heard this year".

== Music video ==
The video for "The Devil Is A Lie" was released on March 20, 2014, and does not include Jay-Z's verse. An unofficial music video directed by Ashley Smith, has amassed a considerable view count on YouTube as well. This video in question has reached 21 million views, while the official has over 2.6 million as of April 2024. The video features 2 catholic priests lip syncing the entire song, rapping Ross and Jay-Z's respective verses.

== Track listing ==
Digital single
No.	Title	Writer(s)	Producer(s)	Length
1.	"The Devil Is A Lie" (featuring Jay-Z)	William Roberts, LeShawn Rogers, Willie McNeal, Shawn "Jay-Z" Carter	Major Seven, K.E. on the Track	5:12

== Chart performance ==
Chart (2014)	Peak position
UK Hip Hop/R&B (OCC)	27
UK Singles (Official Charts Company)	143
US Billboard Hot 100	86
US Hot R&B/Hip-Hop Songs (Billboard)	26
US Hot Rap Songs (Billboard)	16

=== Certifications ===
Region	Certification	Certified units/sales
United States (RIAA)	Gold	500,000^{‡}
^{‡} Sales+streaming figures based on certification alone.

== Release history ==
Country	Date	Format	Label	Ref.
United States	December 19, 2013	Digital download	Maybach Music Group, Slip-n-Slide Records, Def Jam Recordings	
United States	January 13, 2014	Mainstream urban radio	Maybach Music Group, Slip-n-Slide Records, Def Jam Recordings	
United States	January 21, 2014	Urban contemporary radio	Maybach Music Group, Slip-n-Slide Records, Def Jam Recordings	
