= Mastermind (Rick Ross album) =

Studio album by Rick Ross
- Released: March 3, 2014
- Recorded: 2012–2014
- Studios: Big Ship (Kingston); Blueroom (Atlanta); The Hit Factory; Swisher Suite (Miami); Muse (Los Angeles); No Name (Santa Barbara); The Oven (New York City); Storch Music; Studio at the Palms (Las Vegas)
- Genre: Hip hop
- Length: 61:58
- Labels: Maybach; Slip-n-Slide; Def Jam
- Producers: Ben Billions; Bink; Black Metaphor; Boi-1da; D. Rich; DaHeala; J. Manifest; J.U.S.T.I.C.E. League; Kanye West; Mike Will Made It; Omar Walker; Puff Daddy; Reefa; Scott Storch; Stats; Stevie J; Streetrunner; Vinylz; The Weeknd

Rick Ross chronology
God Forgives, I Don't (2012)	Mastermind (2014)	Hood Billionaire (2014)

Deluxe edition cover

Singles from Mastermind
- 1. "The Devil Is a Lie" Released: December 19, 2013; 2. "War Ready" Released: February 17, 2014; 3. "Thug Cry" Released: March 13, 2014

Mastermind is the sixth studio album by American rapper Rick Ross. It was released on March 3, 2014, by Maybach Music Group, Slip-n-Slide Records and Def Jam Recordings. The album features guest appearances from Jay-Z, Jeezy, The Weeknd, Kanye West, Big Sean, Meek Mill, Lil Wayne, French Montana, Diddy, Sizzla, Mavado, Z-Ro and Scarface. The album was supported with the official singles "The Devil Is a Lie", "War Ready" and "Thug Cry", in addition to the promotional singles "Box Chevy", "No Games" and "Nobody".

Mastermind received generally positive reviews from critics. The album debuted at number one on the US Billboard 200, with first-week sales of 179,000 copies in the United States. The album was nominated for Album of the Year at the 2014 BET Hip Hop Awards. Mastermind is also the first of two albums Ross released in 2014, followed eight months later by Hood Billionaire.

== Background ==
In December 2012, it was reported that Ross had begun working on his sixth studio album. On January 1, 2013, he announced he would release the title of his sixth studio album on January 7, 2013. On January 7, 2013, in a promotional video he revealed the title of sixth album would be Mastermind. On June 10, 2013, during an interview with MTV News, the rapper explained that Mastermind will have a soulful vibe, saying: "That's most definitely the feel and that's why I made sure I wanted to open at the top of the new year. I wanted to make that clear for the ones that paid attention that that's most definitely my vibe. I love making those kind of records, those 'Cigar Music' records, those 'Amsterdam' records, and that was most definitely the energy, but I record so much material — we gotta wait and see."

In an October 10, 2013, interview with Civil TV, Ross spoke about the background of the album saying, "In the past year I done seen some things, I done been through some things, so you're going to feel that passion and that aggression. I think the streets are really going to love this." He also said he was putting "the finishing touches" on a song he wanted to get Bobby Womack featured on. In an October 2013 interview with Hot 97, he explained the album title, saying: "It's all about coming from wherever you come from and take it wherever you want to go to. And the minute you do that that's when you can consider yourself a mastermind." In December 2013, during an interview on Hip-Hop Nation, Ross spoke about why he decided to push the album back from its original December 17, 2013, release date, saying: "I'm still putting the final touches on the album. You know me, making that classic is more important than anything and making sure the streets are overwhelmed with what I am doing is what is most important. I'm gonna try to get it to you, and if I don't, I'ma get it to you ASAP."

== Recording and production ==
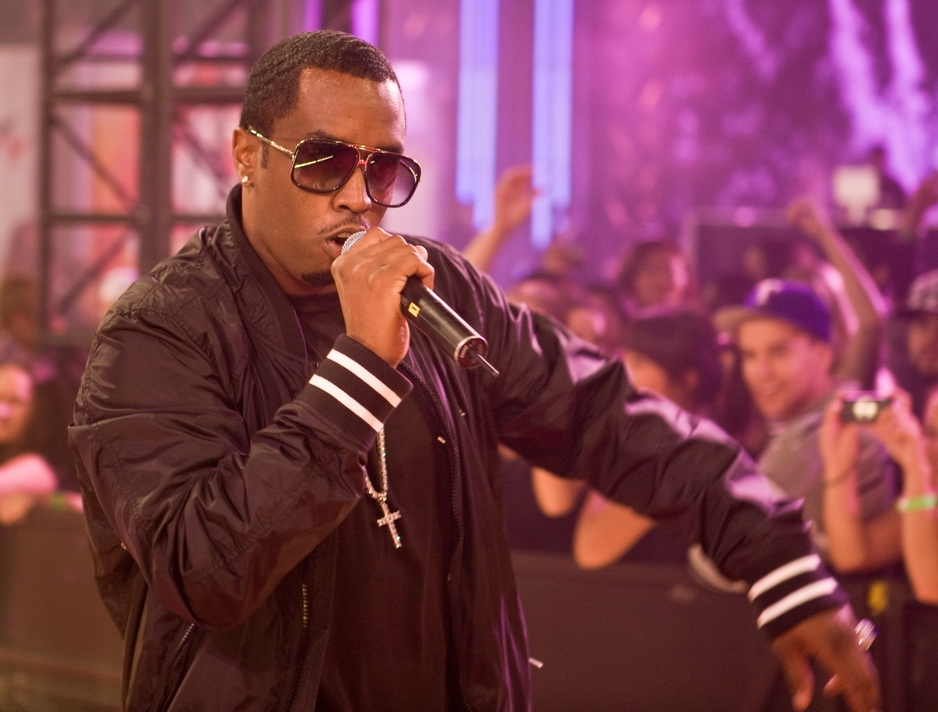
Frequent collaborator Diddy mixed Mastermind and was the album's executive producer.

On January 9, 2014, the album was mixed by Diddy. Also in January 2014, Scott Storch confirmed that he provided production on the album. The following month, Mike Will Made It revealed that he had produced a collaboration between Ross and Jeezy for the album. The album was executive produced by Ross and co-produced by Diddy. On February 7, 2014, DJ Mustard revealed that he co-produced "Sanctified" with Kanye West. Ross collaborated with various artists during the album's recording process. The final version of the album would feature Jay-Z, Jeezy, The Weeknd, Sizzla, Mavado, Kanye West, Big Sean, Meek Mill, Lil Wayne, French Montana, Diddy, Scarface and Z-Ro.

In a March 2014, interview with Shaheem Reid, he spoke about how the album's executive producer Diddy was adamant about having the album sound like it was recorded all in the same day, saying: "That's the expertise that Puff bring to the table. The way he orchestrate the music. Myself I'm in the studio—For example, and I'll hear a record come on from a writer's perspective I'm listening to the rhymes, the tones, punch lines, and then the beat. And it's the total opposite when Puff in the studio. He listening to the snare, to the high hat, to the kick. All previous of my five albums whenever I mixed my album and went to master it I could master my album in three hours. With the process Puff put it through it took three days. Yeah, so it was like giving it a '90s feel…I was in the studio. I'm smoking. I'm drinking. And Puff just said 'This album, this album it's missing one thing. We gotta make it feel like it was recorded in the same booth, same day.'"

== Release and promotion ==
On September 16, 2013, Ross announced the Mastermind Tour Dates, a mini-USA tour to promote Mastermind which ran from November 12, 2013, to November 23, 2013. On October 9, 2013, Ross announced on his Twitter account that the album would be released on December 17, 2013. Two days later, a trailer for the album was released. The trailer "chronicles Ross' journey starting in 1999 through a series of fast moving shots quickly covering his come up through the rap ranks." Footage of Jay-Z, Diddy, Birdman, Big Meech, Pablo Escobar and Muhammad Ali are spliced into the video for effect. On January 14, 2014, Def Jam announced that the album would be released on March 4, 2014. On January 24, 2014, the album's cover art was unveiled. On April 3, 2014, the music video was released for "Rich Is Gangsta". On August 3, 2014, the music video was released for "Supreme". On August 4, 2014, the music video was released for "What a Shame" featuring French Montana. On August 27, 2014, the music video was released for "Drug Dealers Dream".

== Singles ==
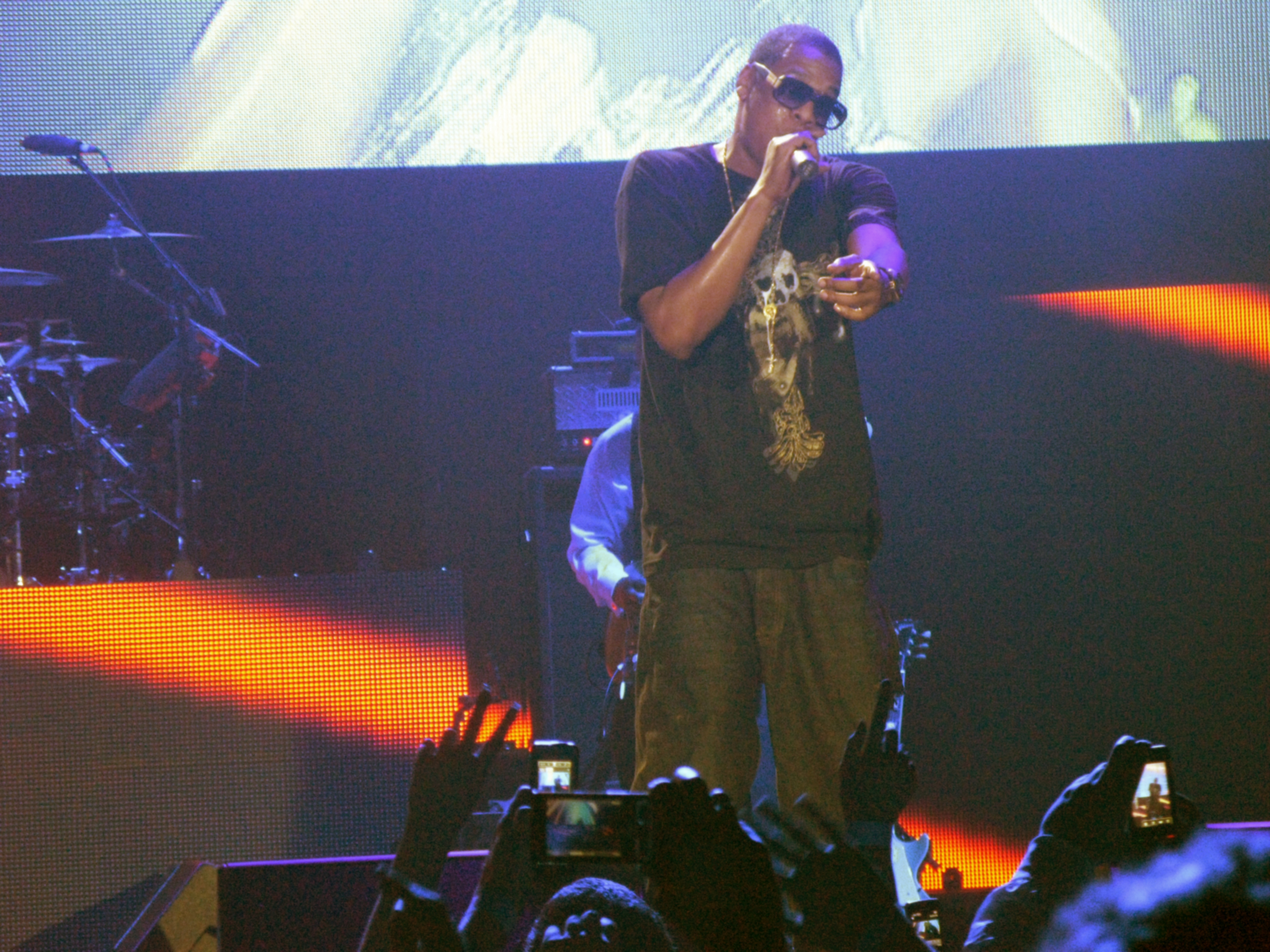
Rapper Jay-Z made a guest appearance on the album's lead single "The Devil Is a Lie".

The first promotional single, "Box Chevy", was released on February 15, 2013. The music video was filmed on April 1, 2013, and features cameo appearances from MMG members Gunplay, Stalley and Rockie Fresh. On May 2, 2013, the music video was released for "Box Chevy". The song peaked at number six on the US Bubbling Under R&B/Hip-Hop Singles.

The album's second promotional single, "No Games" featuring Future, was released on September 5, 2013. The song was produced by J.U.S.T.I.C.E. League. The following day it was sent to urban contemporary radio as a single. The music video for "No Games" was filmed on October 10, 2013. The song has since peaked at number 19 on the Bubbling Under R&B/Hip-Hop Singles. On November 3, 2013, the music video was released for "No Games" featuring Future.

On October 23, 2013, Ross announced that the album's first official single, which will feature Jay-Z, will be released in early November 2013. The following day, Ross revealed that the song is titled "The Devil Is a Lie". He explained that song saying, "We're pushing the envelope once again and it's just one of those records I can't wait to hit the streets. We went in another direction but it's just one of those records that's gonna speak for itself and everybody's gonna have their opinion of it, but it's most definitely what the streets need." On December 19, 2013, "The Devil Is a Lie" featuring Jay-Z, was released for digital download. On March 20, 2014, the music video was released for "The Devil Is a Lie".

On January 24, 2014, it was announced that the next single would be titled, "War Ready", and would feature Jeezy. It was then released on February 17, 2014. On February 27, 2014, the music video was released for the third promotional single, "Nobody" featuring French Montana and Diddy. On March 7, 2014, the music video was released for "War Ready" featuring Jeezy.

The album's third official single, "Thug Cry" featuring Lil Wayne, was serviced to mainstream urban radio in the United States on March 13, 2014. On May 5, 2014, the music video was released for "Thug Cry" featuring Lil Wayne.

== Critical reception ==
Professional ratings
Aggregate scores
Source	Rating
AnyDecentMusic?	6.3/10
Metacritic	68/100
Review scores
Source	Rating
AllMusic	4/5 stars
The A.V. Club	B−
Entertainment Weekly	A−
Exclaim!	7/10
HipHopDX	3.0/5
Los Angeles Times	1.5/4 stars
NME	8/10
Pitchfork	5.8/10
Spin	5/10
XXL	4/5

Mastermind was met with generally positive reviews. At Metacritic, which assigns a normalized rating out of 100 to reviews from professional publications, the album received an average score of 68, based on 23 reviews. Aggregator AnyDecentMusic? gave it 6.3 out of 10, based on their assessment of the critical consensus.

Nick Catucci of Entertainment Weekly said, "As always, he's got a gifted ear for rumbly, deep-gloss beats. "Sanctified", which Kanye produced and raps on, sounds like platinum mallets drumming on shipping containers. His flow too remains flawlessly weighted. He's leisurely and precise even on the theatrically dark "In Vein", where he raps fast to play-off the Weeknd's cynical come-ons. The bleaker the setting, the brighter Ross shines." David Jeffries of AllMusic said, "Mastermind—Ross' annual stomp-and-swagger album, 2014 edition—could be swapped out with 2009's Deeper Than Rap and only those burnt out on the album would know the difference, but when being stuck in a rut means you grind your wheels and all that spews out is gold, you only need to look to successful artists like the always funky James Brown, the always rockin' AC/DC, and the always stoned Devin the Dude for guidance." Jabbari Weekes of Exclaim! stated, "Much like Ross' affinity for mink coats, Mastermind is grandiose in its presentation, but it still only shows the surface of the man behind it." Mikael Wood of the Los Angeles Times said, "As Mastermind's mastermind, though, Ross seems on auto-pilot here." Sheldon Pearce of HipHopDX stated, "Mastermind simply lacks flair. It doesn't possess the pizzazz of Teflon Don, which made Ross a power player or the pure gaudiness of Rich Forever, which perfected his aesthetic. Rick Ross has seemingly run out of moves." Brandon Soderberg of Spin said, "This is Ross at his least cohesive and most clueless since his 2006 debut, Port of Miami. He has finally, totally lost himself in malleable self-mythology. His grip on reality has never been especially tight; that he found a way to further lose his way is actually strangely admirable, isn't it?"

Dan Rys of XXL stated, "What Ross does well, and what he does again on Mastermind, is put together a body of work that is as formidable as he is, and taken as a whole it's impossible to call this anything other than a very good album. Where people like Kanye and Drake and Kendrick Lamar keep winning by shaking up the formula and dabbling in the unexpected, Ross long ago identified his lane, and he is the undisputed kingpin of his brash brand of hip-hop. Ross die-hards will not be disappointed; anyone looking for something new and different was probably looking in the wrong place to begin with. Mastermind is a powerful album, an album with an identity, and one that has some solid songs and a handful of hits. Ross delivers just what he promised." Craig Jenkins of Pitchfork said, "Mastermind finds Ross at a Truman Show moment: his character's reached the logical end of its universe. Going forward, he can either break out or keep up a jig he knows that we know is way past expired." Kevin Ritchie of Now said, "A tighter track list homing in on its sombre (and stoner) moods would've been bolder, but to his credit Ross avoids commercial trendiness in favour of more personal – if familiar – forays into Philly soul, funk, 90s hip-hop and South Beach glam (courtesy of producer Scott Storch on the stellar Supreme)." Michael Madden of Consequence of Sound said, "The main tenet of Ross's Maybach Music Group is loyalty, and Ross is loyal to his fans on Mastermind: it's more or less what we're used to from him. It sounds like the album Ross wanted to make, as inspired by heroes like Dilla, and Onyx, and Wu-Tang Clan, and Biggie, and Camp Lo."

=== Accolades ===
Complex named it the eighteenth best album of the first half of 2014. Writing for them, Justin Charity said, "Like all of Rick Ross' albums, Mastermind is expansively gorgeous. It's cohesive without being 'concept'. [...] "The Devil Is a Lie," which features Jay Z, and "War Ready" are Mastermind's biggest, most lethal beats, bookended by blues and reggae relief. With time, "Sanctified" emerged as the post-Yeezus Kanye collaboration that a real thug would've killed for. This is a perfectly respectable third encore from a rap champion who, if the critics have their say, really could use one of those lavish vacations he boasts about."

== Commercial performance ==
Mastermind debuted at number one on the Billboard 200, with first-week sales of 179,000 copies in the United States. In its second week, the album dropped to number three on the chart, selling 49,000 more copies. In its third week, the album dropped to number seven on the chart, selling 27,000 more copies. In its fourth week, the album dropped to number eleven, selling 19,000 more copies. As of January 2015, the album has sold 397,000 copies in the United States.

== Track listing ==
Credits were adapted from the album's liner notes and BMI.

Mastermind track listing
No.	Title	Writer(s)	Producer(s)	Length
1.	"Intro"			1:01
2.	"Rich Is Gangsta"	William Roberts II; Byron Forest II; Alan Gorrie; Hamish Stuart	Black Metaphor	3:16
3.	"Drug Dealers Dream"	Roberts II; Jerard Wiggins	J. Manifest	4:02
4.	"Shots Fired" (Skit)			0:53
5.	"Nobody" (featuring French Montana)	Roberts II; Karim Kharbouch; Sean Combs; Stevie Jordan; Ephrem Lopez; George Johnson Jr.; Jean Louhisdon; Billy Preston; Christopher Wallace	Puff Daddy; Stevie J (Original version); DJ Enuff^{[a]}; Jiv Pos^{[a]}; Puff Daddy^{[b]}	4:41
6.	"The Devil Is a Lie" (featuring Jay-Z)	Roberts II; Shawn Carter; Omar Walker; Willie McNeal; LeShawn Rogers	Walker; Rogers^{[a]}; McNeal^{[a]}	5:10
7.	"Mafia Music III" (featuring Sizzla and Mavado)	Roberts II; David Brooks; Miguel Collins; Roosevelt Harrell III; Kirk Bennett; Bobby Dixon; Robbie Lyn; Robert Shakespeare	Bink	5:07
8.	"War Ready" (featuring Jeezy)	Roberts II; Jay Jenkins; Tracy Richardson; Michael Williams; Asheton Hogan	Mike Will Made It; A+^{[a]}	7:03
9.	"What a Shame" (featuring French Montana)	Roberts II; Kharbouch; Hector Marin; Sharif Slater; Dennis Coles; Robert Diggs; Gary Grice; Lamont Hawkins; Jason Hunter; Russell Jones; Richard Randolph; Clifford Smith; Ricky Smith; Kevin Spencer; Saladine Wallace; Salahadeen Wilds; David Willis; Corey Woods	Reefa; Stats	2:14
10.	"Supreme"	Roberts II; Scott Storch; Miles Gregory	Storch; Puff Daddy^{[b]}	3:37
11.	"Blk & Wht"	Roberts II; Dwayne Richardson	D. Rich	3:59
12.	"Dope Bitch" (Skit)			2:53
13.	"In Vein" (featuring The Weeknd)	Roberts II; Jason Quenneville; Abel Tesfaye	The Weeknd; DaHeala; Puff Daddy^{[b]}	4:21
14.	"Sanctified" (featuring Kanye West and Big Sean)	Roberts II; Sean Anderson; Kanye West; Mike Dean; Dijon McFarlane	West; DJ Mustard^{[a]}; Dean^{[a]}; Puff Daddy^{[b]}	4:49
15.	"Walkin' on Air" (featuring Meek Mill)	Roberts II; Robert Williams; D. Richardson	D. Rich	4:28
16.	"Thug Cry" (featuring Lil Wayne)	Roberts II; Dwayne Carter, Jr.; Salomes Jackson; Kenny Bartolomei; Kevin Crowe; Erik Ortiz; Adam Carter; Billy Cobham; Opio Lindsey; Tajai Massey; Damani Thompson	J.U.S.T.I.C.E. League	4:25

Deluxe edition (bonus tracks)
No.	Title	Writer(s)	Producer(s)	Length
17.	"Blessing in Disguise" (featuring Scarface and Z-Ro)	Roberts II; Brad Jordan; Joseph McVey; Nicholas Warwar; Khaled Khaled	Streetrunner; DJ Khaled^{[a]}; Vinny Venditto^{[b]}	4:56
18.	"Paradise Lost"	Roberts II; Benjamin Diehl; Brett Bailey; David Mescon; Krystyana Chelminski; Kevin Cossom; Andrea Fisher; Marvin Gaye; James Nyx Jr.; Nicholas Varvatsoulis; Miles Wheeler	Ben Billions; Beats^{[a]}; Messy^{[a]}	4:58
19.	"You Know I Got It (Reprise)"	Roberts II; S. Carter; Matthew Samuels; Anderson Hernandez	Boi-1da; Vinylz; Jerome "J-Roc" Harmon^{[b]}; Timbaland^{[b]}	4:39

Notes

- ^{^[a]} signifies a co-producer
- ^{^[b]} signifies an additional producer
- "Intro" contains additional vocals by Robin Leonard
- "Shots Fired" contains additional vocals by Cira Larkin
- "Nobody" contains background vocals by Teedra Moses, and additional vocals by Diddy
- "War Ready" contains background vocals by Tracy T
- "Supreme" contains additional vocals by Katt Williams and Keith Sweat
- "Dope Bitch" contains vocals RK, Money Marie, and Tak (the underboss)
- "Sanctified" contains additional vocals by Betty Wright
- "Thug Cry" contains additional vocals by Betty Idol

Samples

- "Rich Is Gangsta" contains a sample of "Soul Searching" performed by Average White Band.
- "Nobody" contains a sample of "You're Nobody (Till Somebody Kills You)", written by Sean Combs, Stevie Jordan, George Johnson Jr, Ephrem Lopez, Jean Louhisdon, Billy Preston, and Christopher Wallace.
- "The Devil Is a Lie" contains a sample of "Don't Let Your Love Fade Away" performed by Gene Williams, written by Lee Harris and Ellie Taylor.
- "What a Shame" contains elements of "Shame on a Nigga", written by Dennis Coles, Robert Diggs, Gary Grice, Lamont Hawkins, Jason Hunter, Russell Jones, Clifford Smith, and Corey Woods; a sample of "It Takes Two" by Lyn Collins; and interpolations of "Luchini", written by Richard Randolph, Clifford Smith, Kevin Spencer, Christopher Wallace, David Willis, and Salahadeen Wilds.
- "Supreme" contains elements of "Is It Love You're After", written by Miles Gregory.
- "Thug Cry" contains a sample of "93 Til Infinity" performed by Souls of Mischief, written by Adam Carter, Billy Cobham, Opio Lindsey, Tajai Massey, and Damani Thompson.

== Credits and personnel ==
Credits for Mastermind adapted from AllMusic.

- A+ – producer
- Chris Athens – mastering
- Chris Atlas – marketing
- Sam Berry IV – assistant engineer
- Alex "Gucci Pucci" Bethune – executive producer
- Big Sean – featured artist
- Bink – producer
- Black Metaphor – producer
- Sam Bohl – assistant engineer
- Michael "Banger" Cahadia – vocal engineer
- Dustin Capulong – assistant engineer
- Anthony Cruz – vocal engineer
- Mike Dean – instrumentation, producer
- Diddy – additional production, executive producer, producer
- Ben Diehl – engineer
- DJ Enuff – producer
- DJ Khaled – executive producer
- Dernst "D'Mile" Emile II – additional music, bass
- French Montana – vocals, vocals (background)
- Noah Goldstein – engineer
- Jason Guida – assistant engineer
- Eldwardo "Eddie Mix" Hernandez – engineer
- Victoria Holland – assistant engineer
- Stevie J. – producer
- Jaycen Joshua – mixing
- Jay-Z – featured artist
- Jeezy – featured artist
- J.U.S.T.I.C.E. League – producer
- Anes Ansouri – vocals
- Ryan Kaul – mixing assistant
- John "J-Banga" Kercy – engineer
- Cira Larkin – vocals
- Robin Leonard – vocals
- Lil Wayne – featured artist
- Pamela Littky – photography
- Deborah Mannis-Gardner – sample clearance
- Fabian Marasciullo – mixing
- Hector Marin – producer
- Mavado – featured artist
- Tadarius McCombs – guitar (bass)
- Stephen McDowell – assistant engineer, engineer
- Dijon McFarlane – producer
- Willie McNeal – producer
- Meek Mill – featured artist
- Michelle Trumpler – engineer
- Mike Will Made It – producer
- Zeke Mishanec – assistant engineer
- Money Marie – vocals
- Teedra Moses – vocals (background)
- Jason Patterson – vocal engineer
- Jiv Pos – producer
- Andy Proctor – package production
- Jason Quenneville – producer, vocal engineer
- Rony Rey – vocal engineer
- D Rich – producer
- Ramon Rivas – vocal engineer
- John Rivers – engineer
- RK – vocals
- Todd Robinson – assistant engineer
- Leshawn Rogers – producer
- Rick Ross – executive producer, primary artist
- Sizzla – featured artist
- Sharif Slater – producer
- Stephen "Di Genius" McGregor – vocal engineer
- Scott Storch – producer
- Keith Sweat – vocals
- Tracy T. – vocals (background)
- Tak – vocals
- Matthew Testa – engineer
- Omar Walker – producer
- The Weeknd – featured artist, producer
- Dawud West – package design
- Kanye West – featured artist, producer
- Whole Slab – vocals
- Katt Williams – vocals
- Betty Wright – vocals

== Charts ==
=== Weekly charts ===
Chart performance for Mastermind
Chart (2014)	Peak position
Australian Albums (ARIA)	49
Belgian Albums (Ultratop Flanders)	41
Belgian Albums (Ultratop Wallonia)	42
Canadian Albums (Billboard)	5
Danish Albums (Hitlisten)	39
Dutch Albums (Album Top 100)	25
French Albums (SNEP)	52
German Albums (Offizielle Top 100)	89
Swiss Albums (Schweizer Hitparade)	20
UK Albums (Official Charts)	11
UK R&B Albums (Official Charts)	2
US Billboard 200	1
US Top R&B/Hip-Hop Albums (Billboard)	1

=== Year-end charts ===
2014 year-end chart performance for Mastermind
Chart (2014)	Position
US Billboard 200	44
US Top R&B/Hip-Hop Albums (Billboard)	10
