= MTV's Hottest MCs in the Game =

MTV's Hottest MCs in the Game is a list compiled of ten hip hop artists deemed to be the "hottest" of that given year by MTV since 2007. Although MTV has stressed that the list is not meant to represent the greatest rappers of all time but the most interesting and culturally relevant artists of that year, the list is met with much controversy and debate each year. MTV named one rapper the "Hottest Breakthrough MC" of 2011 and that honor went to Machine Gun Kelly. Kanye West currently holds the record for most appearances on the list, being the only rapper to appear on the list every year since its inception.

After a four-year hiatus that began in 2012, MTV announced that they are bringing the list back with a television special that aired on December 11, 2016 on MTV2.

== Background ==
The Hottest MC in the Game List was formed in 2007 and every year a group of Hip-Hop journalists known as "The Brain Trust" debated on who its favorite rapper of that year was. The Brain Trust has been composed of:

- Sway Calloway (on-air correspondent, MTV News)
- Tuma Basa (manager, MTV Music Programming)
- Bridget Bland (producer/writer, MTV Radio Network)
- Buttahman (director, music and talent, "MTV Jams")
- Rahman Dukes (senior producer, MTVNews.com)
- Andrea Duncan-Mao (senior music editor, MTV.com Editorial)
- Sean Lee (supervising producer, MTV News)
- Joseph Patel (producer, MTV News)
- Shaheem Reid (hip-hop editor, MTV News)
- Jayson Rodriguez (hip-hop writer, MTV News)
- Hillary Crosley (RapFix)
- Steven Roberts (MTV News)
- Sheila Grullon (MTV Jams)
- Yomi Desalu (mtvU)
- Ahmed Abdulle (mtvU)
- Mike Masic (mtvU)
- Moe Ahmed (mtvU)
- Rebecca Thomas (writer, MTV News)
- Renaud Jean-Baptiste Jr. (junior copywriter, MTV News)
- Nadeska Alexis (blog editor, RapFix)
- Rob Markman (senior Hip-Hop writer, MTV News)
- Charlamagne Tha God (Radio Personality)
- Karen Civil (Music Executive)
- Nick Cannon (TV & Media Personality)
- Joe Budden (Rapper & Podcast Host)

The Brain Trust judges rappers on the grounds of their artistic execution (lyrical ability, flow), commercial success (charting hits, radio spins, album sales), cultural impact (business acumen, ushering in other big artists), digital metrics (Facebook page likes, Twitter followers, new songs on mixtapes), buzz and other intangibles. In order to be eligible to be included in the list an artist must have actively released music that year.

== Hottest MC in the Game recipients ==
Legend

1. °: New entry
2. ↑: Up / Re-entry
3. ↓: Down
4. -: Same

=== 2007 ===
1. ° Lil Wayne
2. ° T.I.
3. ° The Game
4. ° André 3000
5. ° Kanye West
6. ° Young Jeezy
7. ° Jay Z
8. ° 50 Cent
9. ° Common
10. ° Jim Jones

=== 2008 ===
Sources:

1. ↑ Kanye West
2. ↑ Jay Z
3. ↓ Lil Wayne
4. ° Rick Ross
5. ° Snoop Dogg
6. ↑ 50 Cent
7. ° Lupe Fiasco
8. ↓ Young Jeezy
9. ↓ André 3000
10. ↓ T.I.

=== 2009 ===
Sources:

1. ↑ Jay Z
2. ↑ Lil Wayne
3. ° Drake
4. ↓ Kanye West
5. ↓ Rick Ross
6. ° Gucci Mane
7. ↑ Young Jeezy
8. ° Fabolous
9. ↓ 50 Cent
10. ° Raekwon

=== 2010 ===
Sources:

1. ° Eminem
2. ↓ Jay Z
3. ↑ Kanye West
4. ↓ Drake
5. - Rick Ross
6. ° Nicki Minaj
7. ↓ Lil Wayne
8. ° Waka Flocka Flame
9. ° B.o.B
10. ° Ludacris

=== 2011 ===
1. ↑ Rick Ross
2. ↑ Drake
3. - Kanye West
4. ↑ Nicki Minaj
5. ↑ Lil Wayne
6. ↓ Jay Z
7. ° Meek Mill
8. ° Big Sean
9. ° Wiz Khalifa
10. ° Wale

=== 2012 ===
1. ° Kendrick Lamar
2. ° 2 Chainz
3. ↓ Rick Ross
4. ° Nas
5. ↓ Drake
6. ↑ Big Sean
7. ↓ Kanye West
8. ° ASAP Rocky
9. ° Future
10. ↓ Meek Mill

=== 2016 ===
Sources:

1. ↑ Kanye West
2. ↑ Drake
3. ° Chance the Rapper
4. ° Travis Scott
5. ° Young Thug
6. ↑ Future
7. ° YG
8. ↓ Kendrick Lamar
9. ° Lil Uzi Vert
10. ° 21 Savage

== Annual Hottest MC chart ==
Position	Top MC	Year inducted	Appearances	Peak ranking
1	Kanye West	2007	7	1
2	Lil Wayne	2007	5	1
3	Jay Z	2007	5	1
4	Rick Ross	2008	5	1
5	Kendrick Lamar	2012	2	1
6	Eminem	2010	1	1
7	Drake	2009	5	2
8	T.I.	2007	2	2
9	2 Chainz	2012	1	2
10	Game	2007	1	3
11	Chance the Rapper	2016	1	3
12	André 3000	2007	2	4
12	Nicki Minaj	2010	2	4
12	Nas	2012	1	4
12	Travis Scott	2016	1	4
16	Snoop Dogg	2008	1	5
16	Young Thug	2016	1	5
18	Young Jeezy	2007	3	6
18	50 Cent	2007	3	6
18	Big Sean	2011	2	6
18	Future	2012	2	6
18	Gucci Mane	2009	1	6
23	Meek Mill	2011	2	7
23	Lupe Fiasco	2008	1	7
23	YG	2016	1	7
26	Fabolous	2009	1	8
26	Waka Flocka Flame	2010	1	8
26	ASAP Rocky	2012	1	8
29	Common	2007	1	9
29	B.o.B	2010	1	9
29	Wiz Khalifa	2011	1	9
29	Lil Uzi Vert	2016	1	9
33	Jim Jones	2007	1	10
33	Raekwon	2009	1	10
33	Ludacris	2010	1	10
33	Wale	2011	1	10

=== Notes ===
- Kanye West is the only rapper to be on the list every year since its inception. Coincidentally, he is also the only person to be named "Hottest MC" twice (for both 2008 and 2016)
- Nicki Minaj is the only female rapper to be included in the list.
- Lil Wayne, Eminem, and Kendrick Lamar are the only rappers to be named the "Hottest MC" the first time they were included on the list.
