= Hood Billionaire =

Studio album by Rick Ross
- Released: November 24, 2014
- Recorded: 2013–2014
- Genre: Trap
- Length: 60:09
- Labels: Maybach; Slip-n-Slide; Def Jam
- Producers: Rick Ross (exec.); Sean Combs (also exec.); DJ Khaled (exec.); Bassivity; Beat Billionaire; Ben Billions; Big K.R.I.T.; Cardiak; CritaCal; Deedotwill; DJ Toomp; eMIX; Metro Boomin; MoneyBag$; Lex Luger; The Remedy Production Group; Timbaland; Tracy Tyler; V12 The Hitman

Rick Ross chronology
Mastermind (2014)	Hood Billionaire (2014)	Black Dollar (2015)

Singles from Hood Billionaire
- 1. "Elvis Presley Blvd." Released: September 19, 2014; 2. "Keep Doin' That (Rich Bitch)" Released: October 6, 2014; 3. "If They Knew" Released: October 30, 2014; 4. "Nickel Rock" Released: November 4, 2014

Hood Billionaire is the seventh studio album by American hip-hop recording artist Rick Ross. The album was released through Maybach Music Group, Slip-n-Slide Records and Def Jam Recordings on November 24, 2014. The album features guest appearances from Jay-Z, K. Michelle, French Montana, Project Pat, Yo Gotti, Boosie Badazz, Big K.R.I.T., Whole Slab, R. Kelly, and Snoop Dogg. The album was supported by the singles "Elvis Presley Blvd.", "Keep Doin' That (Rich Bitch)" and "Nickel Rock".

Hood Billionaire is the second of two albums Ross released in 2014, being released eight months after Mastermind.

== Background ==
On September 15, 2014, he announced that his seventh studio album would be titled Hood Billionaire and set the release date for November 24, 2014. In an October 2014, interview with Power 105.1's The Breakfast Club, he spoke about why he wanted to release two albums in 2014, saying: "That’s how bosses do it, ya heard me? That cake so stacked up we ain’t even gotta do that. Then if we text Def Jam you know they’ll bring that bag…It was just something that I wanted to do when I recorded the music. If you go back and listen to my interviews speaking on Mastermind I was saying I felt like I made two albums because it was two different feelings. Mastermind was the type of album that I wanted to open up. I wanted it to have a rich feel to it…That throwback Puff feel mid-way through it. And this right here. Just certain energies. And this right here this my Geechi Liberace. This a gold ring on every finger. We holding the bottles in the sky letting the champagne run down our arm. So, it’s just that feel good record. A lot of 808s, real bass heavy. And it’s gon’ feel different to you. So, it's gonna feel like a full year from the boss."

== Singles ==
On September 15, 2014, the music video for "Elvis Presley Blvd." featuring Project Pat was released. On September 19, 2014, the album's first single "Elvis Presley Blvd." featuring Project Pat was released.

On October 6, 2014, the album's second single "Keep Doin' That (Rich Bitch)" featuring R. Kelly was released. In an October 2014, interview with Power 105.1's The Breakfast Club, he spoke about "Keep Doin' That (Rich Bitch)" saying: "My musical accruement is higher than a lot of other people, man. I’m a fan of the music, the writing skills, the creativity. And R. Kelly has flawlessly brought us dope records. That’s just speaking on the homie previous. This record we just did is most definitely a dope record, a feel good record. You know what I’m saying? Something the chicks gon’ be able to turn up to. Let the bosses lean on the wall a little bit. And just shine for you...It was just us sitting there thinking we wanted to bring that [feeling]. So, we actually used two different mansions for different shots. And we just did it big. The homie took it to that next level. I did my thing. Shout out to the city of Atlanta from Jeezy, T.I. The list [is] just too many to name." On October 26, 2014, the music video was released for "Keep Doin' That (Rich Bitch)" featuring R. Kelly. On October 30, 2014, the album's third single "If They Knew" featuring K. Michelle was released.

On November 4, 2014, the album's fourth single "Nickel Rock" featuring Boosie Badazz was released. On November 13, 2014, the music video was released for "Trap Luv" featuring Yo Gotti. On November 24, 2014, the music video was released for "If They Knew" featuring K. Michelle. On November 25, 2014, the music video was released for "Hood Billionaire". On December 31, 2014, the music video was released for "Nickel Rock" featuring Lil Boosie. The music video for "Movin Bass" was released on March 6, 2015. Jay-Z does not appear in the video. On April 6, 2015, the music video was released for "Phone Tap". On April 20, 2015, the music video for "Quintessential" featuring Snoop Dogg was released.

== Critical reception ==
Professional ratings
Aggregate scores
Source	Rating
Metacritic	54/100
Review scores
Source	Rating
The A.V. Club	C
Billboard	2.5/5 stars
Complex	3/5 stars
Consequence of Sound	C
Exclaim!	5/10
HipHopDX	2.5/5 stars
The Michigan Daily	B-
Newsday	C
The Plain Dealer	B+
Rolling Stone	2.5/5 stars

Hood Billionaire received generally mixed reviews from music critics. At Metacritic, which assigns a normalized rating out of 100 to reviews from critics, the album received an average score of 54, which indicates "mixed or average reviews ", based on 10 reviews. Killian Young of Consequence of Sound said, "Hood Billionaire is a half-baked testament to how difficult it is to make great records in rapid succession." Andre Grant of HipHopDX stated, "Hood Billionaire is the second album of 2014 for Rick Ross. This stands in contrast to 2014s now well documented trajectory of A-listers holding back on their projects until 2015. Instead, Rozay is stepping out to the forefront with a project that is a diluted version of his initial 2014 offering Mastermind, which itself lacked the mythic grandiosity of his previous works. In that way, Hood Billionaire, offers itself as an example of good concepts that do not strike the chord they are meant to." Calum Slingerland of Exclaim! said, "Some of the more intriguing moments on Hood Billionaire come when Ross steps out from the guise of the wealthy figurehead and waxes humble. The sparse "Phone Tap" tells a tale of drug dealing paranoia, while the Big K.R.I.T.-assisted "Brimstone" is a remorseful hymnal. These moments are still few and far between, and the rest of Ross' tales of pushing fall short of revealing whether his ascent to boss status is factual or purely fictional." Meaghan Garvey of Billboard stated, "Ross seems to be in the victory-lap phase of his career: Hood Billionaire lands in a dull gray area between feel-good retro rap (its first two singles are the Memphis homage "Elvis Presley Blvd" and the pleasant but forgettable jazz jangle of "Keep Doin' That [Rich Bitch]") and Rozay greatest-hits karaoke that tries and fails to recapture the impact of his bulletproof Teflon Don bombast."

== Commercial performance ==
The album debuted at number six on the Billboard 200 chart, with first-week sales of 74,444 copies in the United States. It was a 50% decrease in sales from his previous studio album, Mastermind, released eight months earlier that year, which sold 179,000 copies in its first week of sales. It was also the lowest first-week sales of Rick Ross' career, selling 69,033 copies shorter of its competitor, the Shady Records compilation, Shady XV, which was released that exact day and also debuted at number three. In its second week, the album dropped to number 42 on the chart, selling 15,513 copies. In its third week, the album dropped to number 64 on the chart, selling 10,171 copies. As of November 2015, the album has sold over 190,000 copies in the United States.

== Track listing ==
Standard Edition
No.	Title	Writer(s)	Producer(s)	Length
1.	"Intro"	William Roberts II	eMIX	2:07
2.	"Hood Billionaire"	Roberts; Lexus Arnel Lewis; Keondrea Williams	Lex Luger; Deedotwill^{[a]}	3:57
3.	"Coke Like the 80’s"	Roberts; Shamann Cooke	Beat Billionaire	4:48
4.	"Heavyweight" (featuring Whole Slab)	Roberts; Cooke; Lasana Smith	Beat Billionaire	4:06
5.	"Neighborhood Drug Dealer"	Roberts; Leland Wayne	Metro Boomin	3:53
6.	"Phone Tap"	Roberts; Benjamin Diehl; Bob Florence; Al Capps; Dave Pell; Thomas Snuff Garrett	Ben Billions	4:38
7.	"Trap Luv" (featuring Yo Gotti)	Roberts; Mario Mims; Deonte Hayes; Carlton Mays Jr; Donny Hathaway	MoneyBag$	4:10
8.	"Elvis Presley Blvd." (featuring Project Pat)	Roberts; Aldrin Davis; Patrick Houston; Arthur Ross; Leon Ware	DJ Toomp	6:02
9.	"Movin’ Bass" (featuring Jay Z)	Roberts; Tim Mosley; Jerome Harmon; Shawn Carter; Chris Godbey	Timbaland; J-Roc^{[a]}	4:23
10.	"If They Knew" (featuring K. Michelle)	Roberts; Terius Nash; Craig Crippen; Mosley; Andre Brissett; Godbey; Jonathan Solone-Myvett	Timbaland	4:34
11.	"Quintessential" (featuring Snoop Dogg)	Roberts; Davis; Calvin Broadus	DJ Toomp	3:13
12.	"Keep Doin’ That (Rich Bitch)" (featuring R. Kelly)	Roberts; Mack Loggins; Robert Kelly; Les Baxter; Tyrone Griffin, Jr	V12 The Hitman	4:13
13.	"Nickel Rock" (featuring Boosie Badazz)	Roberts; Torrence Hatch	Tracy Tyler	4:47
14.	"Burn"	Roberts; Cooke	Beat Billionaire	5:15
15.	"Family Ties"	Roberts; Carl McCormick; Calvin Price; Bobby Eli; Jeffrey Prusan	Cardiak; CritaCal^{[a]}	3:42
16.	"Brimstone" (featuring Big K.R.I.T.)	Roberts; Justin Scott; Mike Hartnett	Big K.R.I.T.	5:56

Best Buy Deluxe Edition, International Edition
No.	Title	Writer(s)	Producer(s)	Length
17.	"Wuzzup"	Roberts; Isaac Bivens; Nathan Connolly; Gary Lightbody; Tom Simpson; Jonny Quinn; Paul Wilson; Garret Lee	The Remedy Production Group	3:38
18.	"Headache" (featuring French Montana)	Roberts; Vanja Ulepić; Slobodan Veljković; Samuel Jacquet; Jamal Rashid; Karim Kharbouch; Janet Sewell	Bassivity	4:51

Notes

- ^{^[a]} signifies a co-producer.

== Charts ==
=== Weekly charts ===
Chart (2014)	Peak position
Belgian Albums (Ultratop Flanders)	179
Belgian Albums (Ultratop Wallonia)	199
French Albums (SNEP)	141
Swiss Albums (Schweizer Hitparade)	66
UK Albums (Official Charts)	61
UK Album Downloads (Official Charts)	25
UK R&B Albums (Official Charts)	6
US Billboard 200	6
US Top R&B/Hip-Hop Albums (Billboard)	2

=== Year-end charts ===
Chart (2015)	Peak position
US Billboard 200	197
US Top R&B/Hip-Hop Albums (Billboard)	21
US Rap Albums (Billboard)	14

== Release history ==
Region	Date	Format	Label	Ref.
Australia	November 24, 2014	CD, Digital download	Universal	
United Kingdom	November 24, 2014	CD, Digital download	Virgin EMI	
United States	November 24, 2014	CD, Digital download	Maybach, Def Jam	
Germany	November 24, 2014	CD	Def Jam Germany	
