= Beat Billionaire =

American record producer

- Born: Shamann Cooke; July 19, 1982 (age 43); Richmond, Virginia, U.S.
- Occupation: Producer
- Labels: Grand Hustle; Maybach Music Group; Roc Nation
- Website: www.officialbeatbillionaire.com

Shamann Cooke (born July 19, 1982), known professionally as Beat Billionaire, is an American record producer. Cooke grew up in a household with his four brothers in Chippenham Apartments in Southside Richmond, Virginia. He later moved to New York to work with Method Man, Redman, Das Efx, K-Solo, and many more. Parrish Smith introduced Cooke to T.I.'s Grand Hustle knowing that they were a supportive team and would help take his career to the next level.

== Grand Hustle to present ==
Cooke began as a rapper but after learning music production chose to focus 100% on producing. He took on the name Beat Billionaire and began working with Grand Hustle Records with artists such as T.I., Young Dro, Yung LA, Gucci Mane, and more. Beat Billionaire then signed with Rick Ross' Maybach Music Group. Beat Billionaire has produced records for the entire MMG roster. He is best known for producing the Rick Ross’ 2010 hit "John Doe", Wale's hit single "Bag of Money" and more recently the hit single from the motion picture Suicide Squad, "Purple Lamborghini" which reached number 33 on the charts and number 6 on the hot dance/electronic chart and number 7 on the rap charts and top 100 worldwide. This hit also came with a 2016 Grammy nomination for Beat Billionaire.

== Production discography ==
Title	Year	Peak chart positions								Certifications
Title	Year	US	US R&B	US Rap	AUS	CAN	GER	NZ	UK	Certifications
"John Doe" (Rick Ross)	2010	—	—	—	—	—	—	—	—	
"Bag of Money" Wale (featuring Rick Ross, Meek Mill and T-Pain)	2012	64	2	3	—	—	—	—	—	
"Hold Up" Birdman (featuring Rick Ross)	2012	—	—	—	—	—	—	—	—	
"Born Stunna" Ca$h Out (featuring Wale)	2014	—	—	—	—	—	—	—	—	
"Heavyweight" Rick Ross (featuring Whole Slabb)	2014	—	—	—	—	—	—	—	—	
"Mr. Miyagi" Boosie Badazz	2015	—	—	—	—	—	—	—	—	
"Purple Lamborghini" (Rick Ross and Skrillex)	2016	33	—	7	39	28	85	34	61	RIAA: Platinum; MC: Gold; FIMI: Gold
"Summer Seventeen" (Rick Ross featuring Yo Gotti)	2017	—	—	—	—	—	—	—	—	
"Dead Presidents" (Rick Ross featuring Future (rapper), Young Jeezy and Yo Gotti)	2017	—	—	—	—	—	—	—	—	
"She On My Dick" Rick Ross (featuring Gucci Mane)	2017	—	—	—	—	—	—	—	—	
"Black Out" French Montana (featuring Young Thug)	2017	—	—	—	—	—	—	—	—	
