= Rick Ross =

American rapper and music executive (born 1976)

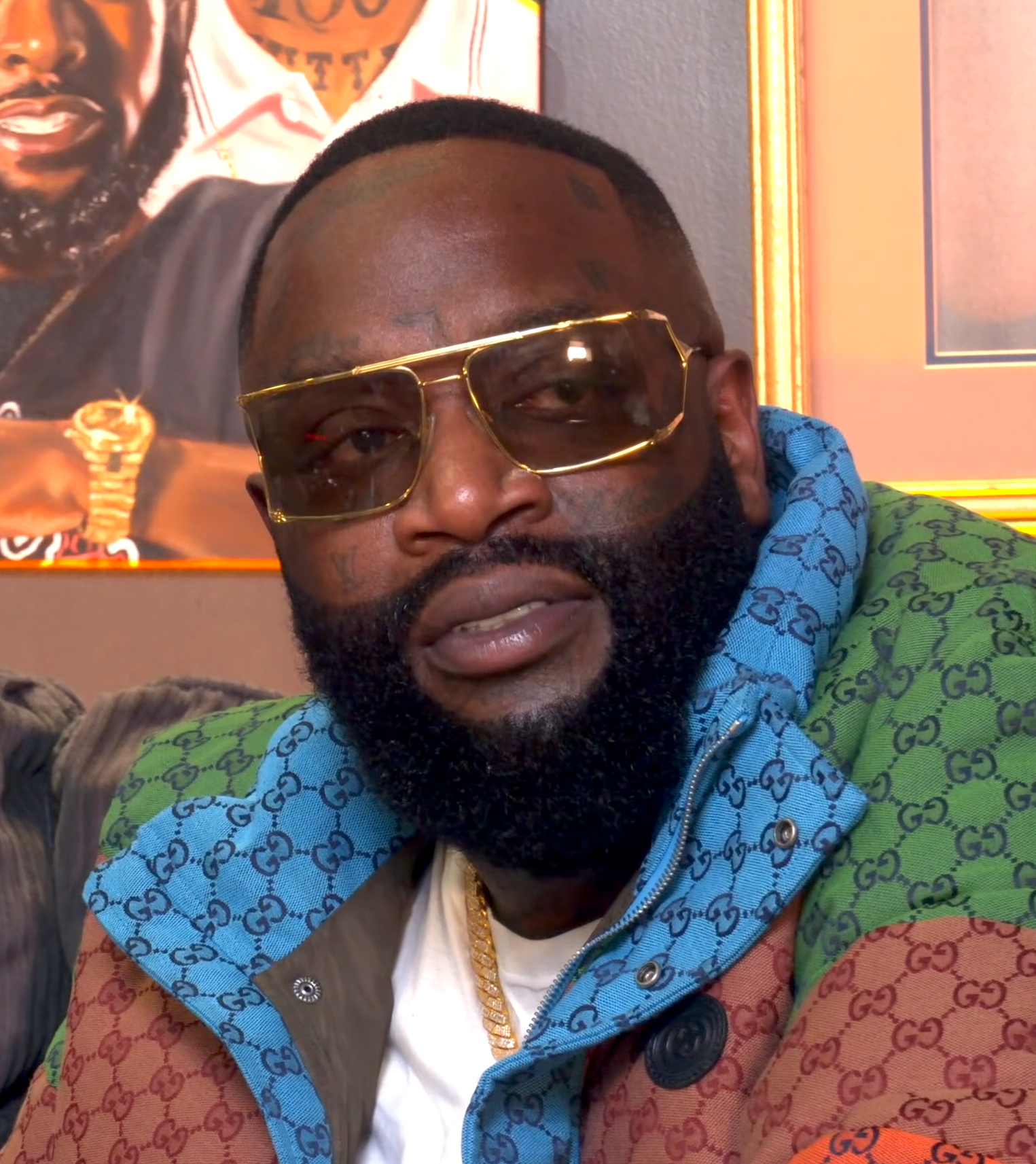
- Ross in 2021
- Born: William Leonard Roberts II; January 28, 1976 (age 50); Clarksdale, Mississippi, U.S.
- Other names: Rozay; The Boss; Renzel; Teflon Da Don
- Occupations: Rapper; songwriter; music executive
- Years active: 2000–present
- Children: 5
- Awards: Full list
- Musical career
- Origin: Miami-Dade County, Florida, U.S.
- Genres: Southern hip-hop; gangsta rap
- Works: Discography
- Labels: Gamma; Epic; Maybach; Def Jam; Suave House; Atlantic; Slip-n-Slide; Poe Boy
- Member of: Triple C's
- Website: rickrosspom2.com

William Leonard Roberts II (born January 28, 1976), known professionally as Rick Ross, is an American rapper and music executive. Noted for his booming vocal presence and vivid lyrical imagery, Ross' music is built upon a rags to riches narrative.

Prior to releasing his debut single, "Hustlin'" in March 2006, Ross was the subject of a bidding war—receiving offers from Diddy's Bad Boy Entertainment and Irv Gotti's Murder Inc.—and ultimately signed a multimillion-dollar deal with Jay-Z on Def Jam Recordings. His debut studio album, Port of Miami (2006), peaked atop the Billboard 200, along with his second and third albums, Trilla (2008) and Deeper Than Rap (2009). His fourth album, Teflon Don (2010) spawned the single "Aston Martin Music" (featuring Drake and Chrisette Michele)—which received triple platinum certification by the Recording Industry Association of America (RIAA)—while his fifth and sixth albums, God Forgives, I Don't (2012) and Mastermind (2014), peaked the Billboard 200 twice more.

Outside of his solo career, Ross was a lead member of the hip-hop group Triple C's, alongside fellow Florida rappers Gunplay and Torch in 2005. Ross founded the record label Maybach Music Group (MMG) in 2008, through which he has signed artists including Meek Mill, Wale, French Montana, and Omarion, among others. MMG entered a joint venture with Def Jam and later Epic Records to release his subsequent albums: Hood Billionaire (2014), Black Market (2015), Rather You Than Me (2017), Port of Miami 2 (2019), and Richer Than I Ever Been (2021). After which, it entered a joint venture with Gamma to release his collaborative album, Too Good to Be True (2023) with Meek Mill. Ross received nine Grammy Award nominations, and has been named "Man of the Year" by hip-hop magazine The Source in 2010 and 2011, as well as "Hottest MC in the Game" by MTV in 2011.

== Early life ==
William Leonard Roberts II was born on January 28, 1976, in Clarksdale, Mississippi, and raised in Carol City, Florida. After graduating from Miami Carol City Senior High School, he attended the historically black college Albany State University on a football scholarship. Roberts worked as a correctional officer for 18 months from December 1995, until his resignation in June 1997.

== Career ==
=== Career beginnings ===
In his early years at Suave House Records, Roberts initially made his debut under the pseudonym Teflon Da Don. He made his recording debut on the song "Ain't Shhh to Discuss" on Erick Sermon's lone album for DreamWorks, Def Squad Presents Erick Onasis. In the mid-2000s, he changed his name to Rick Ross. He derived his stage name from the former drug kingpin "Freeway" Rick Ross, to whom he has no connection.

After being signed to Suave House Records, former label for rap duo 8Ball & MJG, he eventually signed a deal with Slip-n-Slide Records, which has been under the Def Jam label since 2006. While signed to Slip-n-Slide, Roberts toured with fellow rapper Trick Daddy and made guest performances on other Slip-n-Slide albums.

=== 2006–2008: Port of Miami and Trilla ===
His debut album Port of Miami was released in August 2006 and debuted at the top spot on the U.S. Billboard 200 album chart, with sales at 187,000 units during the first week. Christian Hoard of Rolling Stone magazine predicted that it would be "the summer's biggest rap record". The second single was "Push It", which samples "Scarface (Push It to the Limit)", the theme song from the gangster film Scarface. The music video for "Push It" was modeled after the film. During that time, Ross made guest performances on two singles from DJ Khaled's debut Listennn... the Album: "Born-N-Raised" and "Holla at Me". Port of Miami received Gold certification from the Recording Industry Association of America on November 8, 2006.

In March 2008, his second album Trilla was released and, as its predecessor Port of Miami had, debuted at the top of the Billboard 200. Its lead single "Speedin'" featuring R. Kelly peaked at number 21 on the U.S. Billboard Bubbling Under Hot 100 Singles; the next one, "The Boss" featuring T-Pain peaked at number 17 on the Hot 100. The third single "Here I Am" featured Nelly and Avery Storm. MTV News ranked Ross on the fourth spot in its 2008 "Hottest MCs in the Game" list among ten rappers. The fourth single "This Is The Life" featured Trey Songz and was released in July.

=== 2009: Deeper Than Rap ===
I look at the game and the business and all different aspects, it's a lot of great lyricists on the corner that will never properly understand the business and know how to market themselves and get in a position where they can gain capital. I look at all the strategies people use and what made them successful. What made Birdman just as relevant today after selling 50 million records? That intrigues me. To see the class of Jay-Z, his accomplishments and see how he sits backs and accurately makes his moves.

A track from the album called "Valley of Death" was what stood out to MTV reporters. In the song, Ross speaks briefly on his controversial stint as a prison guard. "Keep it trilla, nigga, never had a gun and badge," which he stresses, leaving the word that he was indeed an officer of the law. "Kept a nice watch, smoking on a hundred sack/ Back in the day I sold crack for some nice kicks/ Skippin' school, I saw my friend stabbed with an ice pick/ Can't criticize niggas trying to get jobs/ Better get smart, young brother, live yours." Later, he implies that while he was working as a corrections officer, he was on the streets. "Only lived once and I got two kids/ And for me to feed them, I'll get two gigs," he raps. "I'll shovel shit, I'll C.O./ So we can bow our heads and pray over the meatloaf." The accuracy of some of these lyrics were called into question by reporters.

The cover of the May 2009 issue of XXL magazine, titled "Rick Ross Up in Smoke", featured Ross wearing a pair of Louis Vuitton sunglasses. After publication, a spokesperson for the luxury-goods maker contacted XXL to inform them that Ross was sporting fake sunglasses in the cover image. It was later revealed that the rapper was wearing authentic Louis Vuitton sunglasses which were altered by Jacob Bernstein, known as "The Sunglass Pimp". Bernstein defended his customizations despite Louis Vuitton's insistence that such modification and resale of trademarked property is not legal.

=== 2010–2013: Teflon Don and God Forgives, I Don't ===
In May 2010, he released the critically acclaimed Albert Anastasia EP. On July 20, 2010, he released his fourth album entitled Teflon Don. The lead single was "Super High" featuring Ne-Yo. Actress Stacey Dash made an appearance in the music video. A second single was released titled "Live Fast, Die Young" which features and is produced by Kanye West. The album debuted at number two on the Billboard 200 selling 176,000 copies in its first week.

In November 2010, rapper and frequent collaborator, Diddy, who in 2009 signed Ross to a management deal with his Ciroc Entertainment, announced from his YouTube account, that he and Ross are working on an EP together. A single was released for the project, called "Another One". Ross ended 2010 by releasing another mixtape, Ashes To Ashes on Christmas Eve 2010.

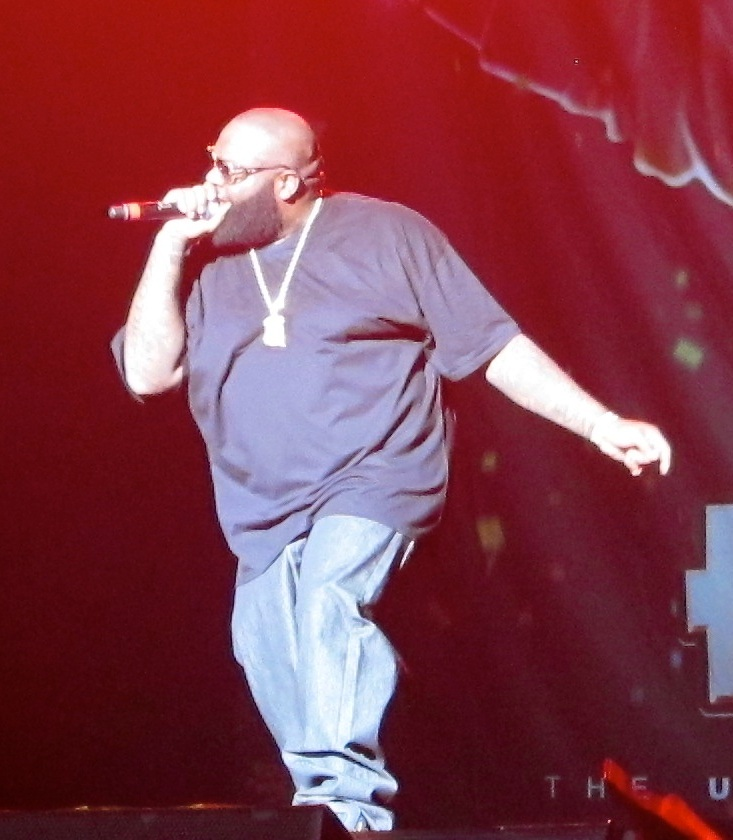
Rick Ross performing in 2011

In early 2011, Rick Ross signed Wale and Meek Mill to his Maybach Music Group imprint. The group released their debut compilation album, Self Made Vol. 1 in May. Rick Ross performed at BET Awards 2011, which aired on June 26, 2011. He also received a nomination for Best Male Hip Hop Artist. In early 2012, Ross was named the Hottest MC in the Game.

In January 2012, he premiered his Rich Forever mixtape to universal acclaim. In June 2012,Ross's MMG camp released their second compilation, Self Made Vol. 2. On July 31, 2012, Ross's fifth album, God Forgives, I Don't, was released, after a few delays. Upon its release, the album charted at number eight on the UK Albums Chart and number two on the UK R&B Albums Chart, making it Ross's highest-charting album and first top 10 album in the United Kingdom. The album debuted at number one on the Billboard 200, with first-week sales of 218,000 copies.

Ross premiered four songs: "So Sophisticated" featuring Meek Mill, "Touch'N You" featuring Usher, "Hold Me Back", and "3 Kings" featuring Dr. Dre and Jay-Z. The album was certified gold in less than two months. To celebrate his accomplishment and promote his upcoming MMG Tour, Ross released a mixtape, The Black Bar Mitzvah in October. Rick Ross was nominated by The Source as its "Man of the Year".

On January 7, 2013, Ross revealed the title of his sixth album to be Mastermind. The album was set to be released in 2013. The first promotional single from the album was "Box Chevy", which was released to iTunes on February 15, 2013. The music video was filmed on April 1, 2013, and features cameos from MMG members Gunplay, Stalley and Rockie Fresh.

In 2008, it was announced that Ross was set to release a collaboration album with his longtime friend Birdman titled The H, but after that, no information on the album was released. On May 16, 2013, Birdman and Rick Ross announced that The H would be released as a mixtape hosted by DJ Khaled on May 23, 2013. The project was recorded during a couple of days in 2008.

On September 5, 2013, Ross premiered the first official single from Mastermind, "No Games" featuring Future produced by J.U.S.T.I.C.E. League. The following day, it was released to Urban contemporary radio. It was followed by the singles "The Devil Is A Lie" with Jay-Z and "War Ready" with Jeezy.

=== 2014: Mastermind and Hood Billionaire ===
In March 2014, Rick Ross released his sixth album, Mastermind. The album received generally positive reviews from critics and debuted at number one on the Billboard 200 chart with first week sales of 179,000 copies. As of April 8, 2014, the album has sold over 290,000 copies in the United States. In June 2014, it was announced that Ross would make a guest appearance on the docu-series Sisterhood of Hip Hop.

In October 2014, Ross announced he would be releasing another album, Hood Billionaire, in order to make up for Meek Mill's Dreams Worth More Than Money album being shelved due to his incarceration. Rick Ross revealed cover art for Hood Billionaire in October 2014 and announced the release date to be set for November 24, 2014. The album received mixed reviews, from fans and critics alike.

=== 2015–2020: Renzel and Epic Records ===
Ross had a mix of both adversity and accomplishments in 2015. Ross was arrested for kidnapping and assault charges and was sentenced to house arrest in his Georgia home. Ross joined the Snapchat platform and began referring to himself as "Renzel", a play on the name of famous actor Denzel Washington. In September, Ross released a mixtape, Black Dollar, his third full-length release since March 2014. He soon announced his eighth album, Black Market, for a December 2015 release. To promote his upcoming release, Ross released a remix tape, Renzel Remixes on Thanksgiving 2015. Black Market was released on December 4, 2015, and it served as Ross's final album for his original contract with Def Jam. The album's song "Free Enterprise" stirred up controversy because the lyrics included the line "Assassinate Trump like I'm Zimmerman" referring to Donald Trump.

In January 2016 after much speculation, Rick Ross signed a solo deal with Epic Records, reuniting him with L.A. Reid, who originally played a major role in signing Ross to Def Jam.

On February 21, 2016, Rick Ross remixed Kanye West's "Famous". Ross was active in 2016, releasing many songs including "Make It Work" off of Self Made Vol. 4, "Purple Lamborghini" (with Skrillex) of Suicide Squad: The Album, "Supa Cindy", and "Freaky Hoe".

In March 2017, his ninth album Rather You Than Me was released. The album debuted and peaked number three on the Billboard 200. On February 2, 2018, Rick Ross released "Florida Boy" with T-Pain and Kodak Black as the first single from the album, which was slated for a 2018 release. On June 22, 2018, Ross released "Green Gucci Suit" with Future as the second single from his tenth album Port of Miami 2, released on August 9, 2019. The album debuted at number two on the Billboard 200.

The album included the single "Gold Roses" with Drake, which was nominated for a Grammy Award for Best Rap Song at the 62nd Annual Grammy Awards. In July 2020, Ross teamed up with singer August Alsina for a track titled "Entanglements", a diss track towards Alsina's ex-lover Jada Pinkett Smith.

In 2017, Ross was criticized for stating in an interview that he never signed a female rapper because "I would end up fucking [her] and fucking the business up." Ross quickly apologized through a Facebook post where he called his comments "insensitive" and a "mistake [he regrets]."

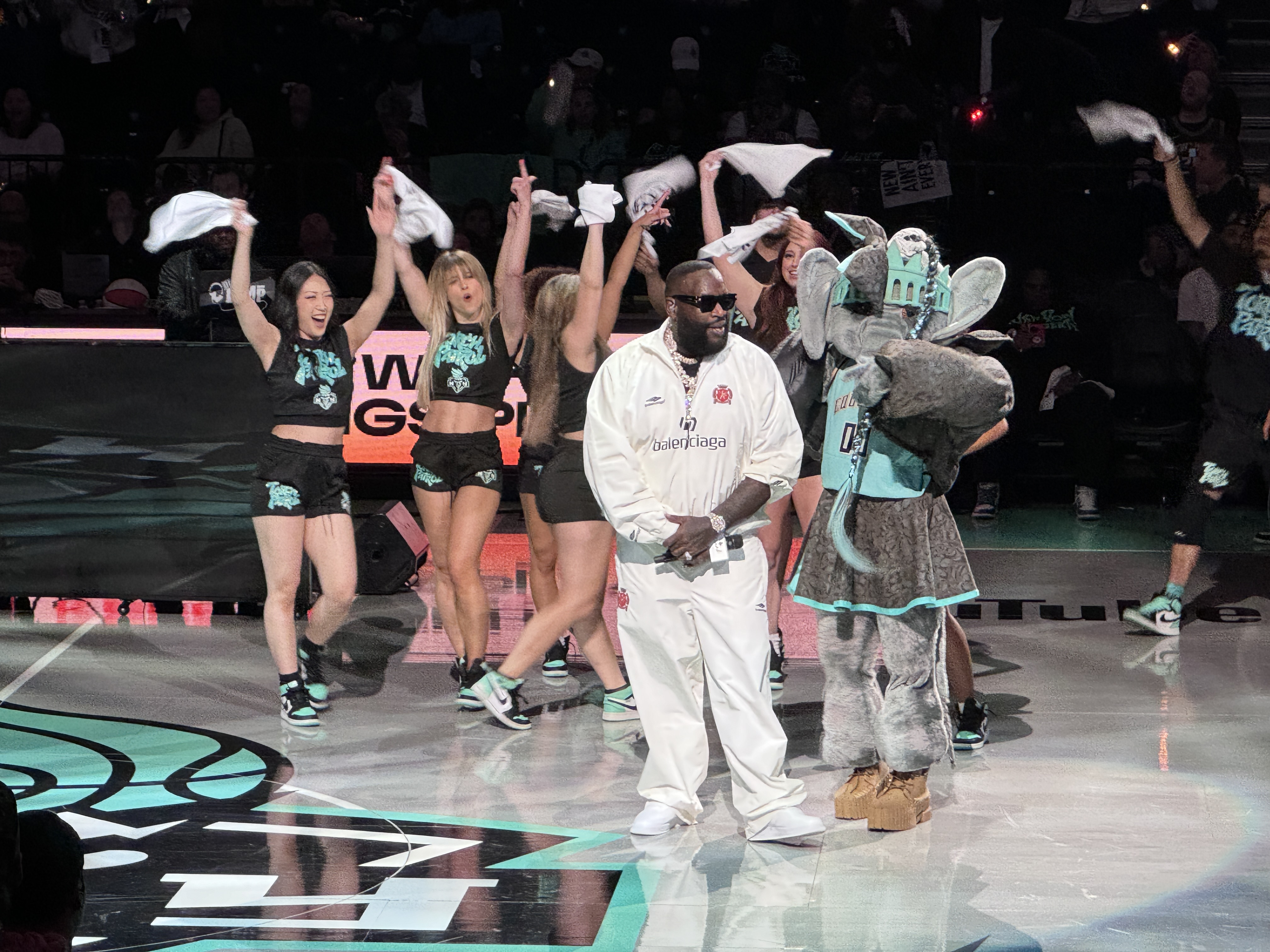
Rick Ross performs with Ellie the Elephant and the Torch Patrol at halftime of a New York Liberty Game during the 2024 WNBA Playoffs.

In August 2020, Ross released the single "Pinned to the Cross", featuring Finn Matthews, following his Verzuz battle with 2 Chainz.

=== 2021–present: Richer Than I Ever Been ===
On December 10, 2021, his eleventh album, Richer Than I Ever Been, was released.

On September 7, 2021, Ross' book The Perfect Day to Boss Up debuted at number 5 on The New York Times weekly bestsellers list. In April 2024, Ross became embroiled in a public feud with former collaborator Drake, after the Jewish rapper dissed him on the leaked version of "Push Ups". Ross responded with the diss track "Champagne Moments", released on April 13, in which he accused Drake of using ghostwriters, having undergone plastic surgery, and being a "white-boy". Ross also repeatedly referred to Drake as "BBL Drizzy".

In January 2025, Ross garnered criticism for, alongside Soulja Boy and Snoop Dogg, performing at a Trump-sponsored cryptocurrency event preceding Trump's second inauguration.

== Personal life ==
=== Family ===
Ross has five children:

- Toie Roberts, born March 2002.
- William Roberts III, born September 2005.
- Berkeley Hermès Roberts, born September 2017.
- Billion Leonard Roberts, born November 2018.
- Bliss Roberts, born August 2020.

Ross was briefly engaged to Lira "Galore" Mercer in 2015.

=== Health ===
On October 14, 2011, Ross suffered two seizures in the same day, once in the morning and again in the early evening. Following the morning seizure, he was unconscious and CPR was performed. After suffering the second seizure, Ross was admitted to a hospital in Birmingham, Alabama, where doctors ran a battery of tests. They declared him healthy. Ross attributes the episodes to a lack of sleep in the previous week. Ross later noted the incident in the remix of Meek Mill's song "Ima Boss", with the line "Had a couple seizures, call it minor setbacks / Everybody praying for me, I respect that / Woke up in the hospital, where my checks at? / Then I put 8 chains where my neck's at".

On March 2, 2018, Ross was hospitalized after being found unresponsive in his Miami, Florida, home from a possible heart attack. Ross was on life support. He was released from the hospital a few days later.

=== Religion ===
Rick Ross is a Christian, and in an interview with Corey "Coco Brother" Condrey on Lift Every Voice, he indicated that "I had told myself at one point no matter what I go through, I never question God." In 2012, Ross said that he prays every time he goes on stage to perform.

=== Correctional officer photos ===
In July 2008, The Smoking Gun produced details linking Ross's social security number to an 18-month stint as a correctional officer at the South Florida Reception Center, along with a photograph first publicized by Media Take Out purporting to be Ross in his correctional officer uniform. Ross initially denied that the photograph was of him, but after overwhelming evidence of his past came into the public's eye, Ross later admitted that he did work as a correctional officer in Florida for 18 months between 1995 and 1997. In a 2008 interview with AllHipHop.com, "Freeway" Ricky Ross claimed offense that Roberts used his name and identity when he learned that The Smoking Gun posted documents revealing Roberts' previous employment as a Florida correctional officer.

=== Drive-by shooting ===
On January 27, 2013, while celebrating his 37th birthday, Ross and his girlfriend were the targets of a drive-by shooting in Fort Lauderdale, Florida. Neither Ross nor his girlfriend were hurt, but they ended up crashing their car into an apartment in an attempt to escape the shooting.

=== Business ventures ===
As of 2017, Ross owned several different Wingstop restaurant locations. Wingstop is a fast-food chain specializing in chicken wings. When Don Lemon was fired from CNN in April 2023, Ross offered him a job, saying, "For some reason, I believe you know what you doing with the lemon pepper wings. So man, just send over your résumé."

== Legal issues ==
=== 2008 arrest ===
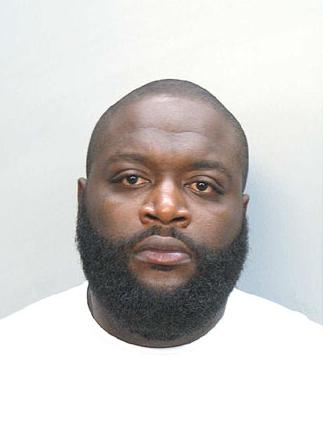
A mug shot of Ross, 2008

In January 2008, Ross was arrested on gun and marijuana charges. During a deposition of Officer Rey Hernandez, a Miami Beach police officer who arrested Ross, Ross's lawyer, Allan Zamren, asked Hernandez why Ross's case was assigned to the gang task force. The officer stated that it was because Ross claimed affiliation with Triple C's (aka Carol City Cartel), and other known gang members. Zamren pressed Hernandez for a personal link between Ross and the gang members, but the officer did not provide proof.

=== DJ Vlad lawsuit ===
In August 2008, YouTube entertainer DJ Vlad filed a lawsuit against Ross for assault and battery. Vlad claimed Ross organized an ambush on him at the 2008 Ozone Awards in Houston, Texas for asking questions about his past as a correctional officer.

=== Freeway Rick Ross litigation ===
In June 2010 "Freeway" Ricky Ross sued Ross for using his name, filing a copyright infringement lawsuit in a California federal court. Jay-Z had been called to testify in the lawsuit, as he was CEO of Def Jam when Ross/Roberts was signed. "Freeway" Ricky Ross, a reformed drug kingpin, sought $10 million in damages in his lawsuit. Also, Freeway Ricky Ross threatened to block the release of Ross's album, Teflon Don.

A week after the lawsuit was filed, Rick Ross responded to the charges: "It's like owning a restaurant, you're gonna have a few slip and falls. You get lawsuits, you deal with them, and get them out your way ... sometimes you lose." He denied rumors that he would change his name to "Ricky Rozay" as a consequence of the lawsuit. The lawsuit was thrown out of court on July 3, 2010. The album Teflon Don was released as scheduled on July 20, 2010.

A federal judge ruled that the case should be refiled in California state court because it fell under California state law. "Freeway" Ricky Ross refiled the case with the State of California and the federal case is on appeal in the United States Court of Appeals for the Ninth Circuit. The state case was filed in 2011 in California.

"Freeway" Ricky Ross refiled in Los Angeles Superior Court with publicity rights claims. Trial was set for early May 2012. The case was dismissed by a judge in the Los Angeles Superior Court.

The California State case was updated with a motion in Freeway Rick Ross's favor as to Warner Bros. Records and their use of the name and image Rick Ross in July 2012.

On December 30, 2013, the court ruled in favor of the rapper Rick Ross, allowing him to keep the name based on a First Amendment ruling.

=== Teflon Don lawsuit ===
In 2011, the rapper Teflon Don filed a trademark infringement lawsuit against Ross for the use of the name as an album title.

=== 2011 marijuana arrest ===
On March 26, 2011, Ross was arrested in Shreveport for possession of marijuana. According to the police records, a strong odor of marijuana was detected from his room at the Hilton in Downtown Shreveport.

=== 2014 North Carolina arrest ===
Ross was arrested on June 27, 2014, in Greensboro, N.C., following his performance at the 2014 SuperJam at the Greensboro Coliseum. The arrest stemmed from a year-old warrant for another North Carolina arrest related to marijuana possession; Ross reportedly failed to appear in court for that violation in 2013.

=== 2015 kidnapping and assault case ===
On June 24, 2015, Rick Ross and his bodyguard were arrested in Fayette County, Georgia on kidnapping and assault charges. Both were accused for forcing a landskeeper into a guesthouse and beating him in the head with a handgun, allegedly over money he owed Ross. On April 4, 2017, Ross pled no contest to a felony count of aggravated assault. The other felony charges were dropped. Ross was sentenced to time served in jail, having already been incarcerated for a week and was also ordered to pay a $10,000 fine.

Ross was sentenced as a first-time felony offender; and, upon payment of the fine, the conviction was erased from his record. Ross pled no contest to 5 misdemeanors: assault, battery, two counts of pointing a pistol at someone, and possession of less than 1 oz of cannabis. For the five misdemeanors, he was given a total of 60 months probation.

=== 2026 domestic violence arrest ===
Mug shot of Ross from 2026.

On October 1, 2026, Ross was arrested in Miami Beach on charges of felony battery by strangulation and misdemeanor battery, both classified as domestic violence offenses. The charges stemmed from an alleged August 28 incident at his Star Island residence, where a woman accused him of repeatedly striking her and restricting her breathing. Ross surrendered to police, pleaded not guilty, and was released on $5,000 bond. Following his release, Ross denied the allegations as "fabricated" and told reporters he planned to spend the weekend eating "rigatoni with heavy marinara."

== Controversies ==
=== Feud with 50 Cent ===
In January 2009, Ross started a feud with rapper 50 Cent because he supposedly looked at him the wrong way at the BET Hip Hop Awards in 2008. 50 Cent told news sources that he did not remember seeing Ross there. In late January, Ross's "Mafia Music" was leaked onto the internet. There were several lines that seemed to disparage 50 Cent. Days later, 50 Cent released "Officer Ricky (Go Head, Try Me)" in response to Ross's remarks.

Within a month, 50 Cent uploaded a video entitled "Warning Shot", wherein he stated: "Rick Ross, I'mma fuck your life up for fun." In addition, 50 Cent released the first of a series of "Officer Ricky" cartoons. Early in February, 50 Cent produced and posted a video to YouTube in which he interviewed "Tia", the mother of one of Ross's children. She confirmed that he had been a correctional officer and claimed his whole persona was inauthentic. On February 5, 2009, The Game, who 50 Cent has a long-standing "beef" with, called in to Seattle R&B station KUBE. When asked about the beef between 50 Cent and Ross, Game sided with 50 Cent, opining that things were not looking good for Ross. He offered to help, stating, "Rick Ross, holla at your boy, man" and "50 eating you, boy."

On his album Deeper Than Rap, Ross references 50 Cent in the song "In Cold Blood". A video for the song was released that portrayed 50 Cent's mock funeral. Upon release, Ross stated that he had ended 50 Cent's career. That same day, Ross released a new diss track called "Push 'Em Over The Edge". The next day, 50 Cent released the controversial video "A Psychic Told Me", dissing DJ Khaled. On February 12, 50 Cent responded to Ross with "Tia Told Me", which was released alongside Lloyd Banks' response "Officer Down" and Tony Yayo's "Somebody Snitched".

In an interview, 50 Cent said Ross is "Albert From CB4. You ever seen the movie? He's Albert," he added. "It never gets worse than this. You get a guy that was a correctional officer come out and base his entire career on writing material from a drug dealer's perspective."

On January 30, 2013, 50 Cent claimed via Twitter that the drive-by shooting that Ross experienced on his birthday two days ago was "staged", reigniting the feud.

A year later, on March 28, 2014, Rick Ross was asked about his feud with 50 Cent. He stated that he does not wish to speak on him anymore, and that he is done with the feud.

His feud with 50 Cent resurfaced in 2016. In January, Ross's MMG record-label artist Meek Mill defended his mentor and criticised 50 on his 4/4 EP.

=== Lyric controversy ===
In a line on rapper Rocko's 2013 song "U.O.E.N.O.", Rick Ross raps the line, "Put molly all in her champagne / She ain't even know it / I took her home and I enjoyed that / She ain't even know it." A petition containing 72,000 signatures was presented to Reebok, demanding they drop Ross as a spokesman for the lyrics which appeared to condone date rape. Ross has apologized for the lyrics, claiming they weren't about rape.

On April 11, 2013, one month after the song's release, Ross was dropped by Reebok. Reebok stated, "while we do not believe that Rick Ross condones sexual assault, we are very disappointed he has yet to display an understanding of the seriousness of this issue or an appropriate level of remorse." They continued on to say, "at this time, it is in everyone's best interest for Reebok to end its partnership with Mr. Ross."

Though Ross apologized for the lyrics, he also argued that his lyrics were misinterpreted because he did not directly use the word "rape". He said, "You know I would never use the term rape in my records ... in reality some people do these things, and shouldn't it be brought to light so young women can protect themselves?!" He continued on Twitter, "I would never use the term 'rape' in my records and as far as my camp. Hip-Hop don't condone that, the streets don't condone that, nobody condones that."

A 2013 Ross concert organized by the student association of Carleton University was cancelled after protests that his lyrics promote rape culture. Rocko later dropped the Rick Ross verse in order to get radio play.

== Discography ==
Studio albums

- Port of Miami (2006)
- Trilla (2008)
- Deeper Than Rap (2009)
- Teflon Don (2010)
- God Forgives, I Don't (2012)
- Mastermind (2014)
- Hood Billionaire (2014)
- Black Market (2015)
- Rather You Than Me (2017)
- Port of Miami 2 (2019)
- Richer Than I Ever Been (2021)
- Set in Stone (2026)

Collaborative albums

- Custom Cars & Cycles (with Triple C's) (2009)
- Too Good to Be True (with Meek Mill) (2023)

== Filmography ==
Year	Title	Type	Role	Notes
2008	Days of Wrath	Film	G Dogg	
2008–2012	Jimmy Kimmel Live!	Television	Himself	Musical guest
2009	Late Show with David Letterman	Television	Himself	Musical guest
2009–2010	Late Night with Jimmy Fallon	Television	Himself	Musical guest
2010–2012	Chelsea Lately	Television	Himself	Musical guest
2010	Freaknik: The Musical	Television	Big Uzi	Voice; TV movie and soundtrack
2013	Magic City	Television	Butterball	Season 2
2016	Martha & Snoop's Potluck Dinner Party	Television	Himself	Season 1
2017	Signed	Television	Himself	Season 1
2018	Superfly	Film	Racks	
2019	Step Up: High Water	Television	Himself	Season 2
2021	Coming 2 America	Film	Himself	
2022	All Elite Wrestling	Television	Himself	1 Episode

== Awards and nominations ==
=== BET Awards ===
Year	Nominee/Work	Award	Result	Lost to
2011	Himself	Best Male Hip Hop Artist	Nominated	Kanye West

=== Grammy Awards ===
The Grammy Awards are awarded annually by the National Academy of Recording Arts and Sciences of the United States. Rick Ross has nine nominations

Year	Nominee/Work	Award	Result
2012	"I'm on One" (with DJ Khaled, Drake & Lil' Wayne)	Best Rap/Sung Collaboration	Nominated
2013	God Forgives, I Don't	Best Rap Album	Nominated
2015	"New Flame" (with Chris Brown & Usher)	Best R&B Performance	Nominated
2015	"New Flame" (with Chris Brown & Usher)	Best R&B Song	Nominated
2017	"Purple Lamborghini" (with Skrillex)	Best Song Written for Visual Media	Nominated
2020	"Gold Roses" (with Drake)	Best Rap Song	Nominated
2023	"God Did" (with DJ Khaled, Lil Wayne, Jay-Z, John Legend & Fridayy)	Song of the Year	Nominated
2023	"God Did" (with DJ Khaled, Lil Wayne, Jay-Z, John Legend & Fridayy)	Best Rap Performance	Nominated
2023	"God Did" (with DJ Khaled, Lil Wayne, Jay-Z, John Legend & Fridayy)	Best Rap Song	Nominated

=== The Source ===
Year	Nominee/Work	Award	Result
2010	Himself	Men of the Year	Won
